= 2026 Brent London Borough Council election =

2026 English local government election

- 7 May 2026

All 57 seats to Brent London Borough Council 29 seats needed for a majority
- Registered: 239,663
- Turnout: 81,895; 34.17%

	First party	Second party
Leader	Muhammed Butt	Suresh Kansagra
Party	Labour	Conservative
Last election	49 seats, 57.9%	5 seats, 24.3%
Seats before	42	5
Seats after	26	11
Seat change	▼23	▲6
Popular vote	57,457	41,782
Percentage	29.3%	21.3%
Swing	▼28.6pp	▼3.0pp
	Third party	Fourth party
Leader	Paul Lorber	Mary Mitchell
Party	Liberal Democrats	Green
Last election	3 seats, 13.6%	0 seats, 3.7%
Seats before	3	5
Seats after	11	9
Seat change	▲8	▲9
Popular vote	30,883	42,119
Percentage	15.8%	21.5%
Swing	▲2.2pp	▲17.8pp
- Results by Ward
Leader before election
Muhammed Butt
Labour
Leader after election
Muhammed Butt
Labour
No overall control

The 2026 Brent London Borough Council election took place on 7 May 2026, as part of the 2026 United Kingdom local elections. All 57 seats on Brent London Borough Council were contested. The election took place alongside local elections in the other London boroughs.

The council had been under Labour majority control prior to the election. At the election, the council went under no overall control. Labour remained the largest party, but fell three seats short of an overall majority. At the subsequent annual council meeting on 20 May 2026 the incumbent leader of the council, Muhammed Butt, was re-appointed to the role, leading a Labour minority administration.

== Background ==
=== History ===
The thirty-two London boroughs were established in 1965 by the London Government Act 1963. They are the principal authorities in Greater London and have responsibilities including education, housing, planning, highways, social services, libraries, recreation, waste, environmental health and revenue collection. Some of the powers are shared with the Greater London Authority, which also manages passenger transport, police and fire.

Since its formation, Brent has been variously under Labour control, no overall control and Conservative control. Only Labour, Conservative, Liberal Democrat and Green councillors have been elected to the council. The council has had an overall Labour majority since the 2010 election. The Liberal Democrats lost all but one of their seats in the 2014 election and lost their final seat in the 2018 election, but returned to the council in the most recent election in 2022 winning three councillors. The incumbent leader of the council is Muhammed Butt, who has held that position since 2014.

=== Council term ===
Kathleen Fraser was suspended from the Labour group in June 2025 pending the outcome of an investigation. In October 2025, Labour councillor Rajan Seelan defected to the Conservatives. In December 2025, five Labour councillors defected to form the first Green grouping on the council. In March 2026, one Labour councillor defected to Your Party. Sunita Hirani was suspended from the Conservatives in April 2026.

== Electoral process ==
Brent, like all other London borough councils, elects all of its councillors at once every four years; the previous election was in 2022. The election uses multi-member first-past-the-post voting, with each ward being represented by two or three councillors. Electors have as many votes as there are councillors to be elected in their ward; the top two or three are elected.

All registered electors (British, Irish, Commonwealth and European Union citizens) living in London aged 18 or over are entitled to vote in the election. People who live at two addresses in different council areas, such as university students with different term-time and holiday addresses, are entitled to be registered for and vote in elections in both local authorities. Voting in person at polling stations takes place from 7:00 to 22:00 on election day, and voters can apply for postal votes or proxy votes in advance of the election.

== Council composition ==
After 2022 election		Before 2026 election		After 2026 election	
Party	Seats	Party	Seats	Party	Seats
Labour	49	Labour	41	Labour	26
Conservative	5	Conservative	5	Conservative	11
Liberal Democrats	3	Liberal Democrats	3	Liberal Democrats	11
		Green	5	Green	9
		Independent	2		
		Your Party	1		

== Results summary ==
2026 Brent London Borough Council election
Party	Seats	Gains	Losses	Net gain/loss	Seats %	Votes %	Votes	+/−
Labour	26	0	23	▼23	46	29.35	57,457	▼28.52
Conservative	11	6	0	▲6	19	21.34	41,782	▼3.00
Liberal Democrats	11	8	0	▲8	19	15.77	30,883	▲2.19
Green	9	9	0	▲9	16	21.51	42,119	▲17.81
Reform	0	0	0	0	0	10.02	19,614	N/A
Independent	0	0	0	0	0	1.92	3,750	▲1.40
Workers Party	0	0	0	0	0	0.05	107	N/A
UKIP	0	0	0	0	0	0.04	69	N/A

== Ward results ==
=== Alperton ===
Alperton (3 seats)
Party	Candidate	Votes	%	±%
Liberal Democrats	Krishna Chauhan	2,042	47.5	
Liberal Democrats	Anton Georgiou	2,029	47.2	
Liberal Democrats	Charlie Clinton*	2,006	46.6	
Labour	Nimisha Ananada	845	19.6	
Labour	Mansoor Akram	785	18.2	
Labour	Delroy Morrison	711	16.5	
Conservative	Sanjana Karnani	655	15.2	
Conservative	Hema Mistry	620	14.4	
Conservative	Vinodchandra Patel	577	13.4	
Reform	Gunjan Patel	475	11.0	
Green	Roger Berlea	471	10.9	
Green	Emma Russell	453	10.5	
Reform	Vishal Patel	439	10.2	
Reform	Aparna Pandya	428	9.9	
Green	Amy Sharrocks	371	8.6	
Turnout		4,546	40.7	▼2.7
Registered electors		11,183		
Liberal Democrats hold				
Liberal Democrats gain from Labour				
Liberal Democrats hold				

=== Barnhill ===
Barnhill (2 seats)
Party	Candidate	Votes	%	±%
Labour	Rhoda Ibrahim	664	29.5	
Labour	Robert Johnson*	637	28.3	
Green	Femi Abel	560	24.9	
Conservative	Tara Furlong	527	23.4	
Conservative	Mabel Balogun	520	23.1	
Green	Rosanna de Lisle	477	21.2	
Independent	Kathleen Fraser*	413	18.3	
Reform	Raju Karania	252	11.2	
Reform	Manish Pancholi	218	9.7	
Liberal Democrats	Zoe Georgiou	121	5.4	
Liberal Democrats	Shirley Kurland	117	5.2	
Turnout		2,398	29.9	▲0.7
Registered electors		8,015		
Labour hold				
Labour hold				

=== Brondesbury Park ===
Brondesbury Park (2 seats)
Party	Candidate	Votes	%	±%
Labour	Ryan Hack*	2,066	59.0	
Labour	Tashi Thomas	1,356	38.7	
Green	Erica Gbajumo*	1,112	31.8	
Green	Beninio McDonough	762	21.8	
Conservative	Frederic Fulton	392	11.2	
Conservative	Raphael Fulton	353	10.1	
Reform	Will Awomoyi	263	7.5	
Reform	Felipe Raskin	261	7.5	
Liberal Democrats	Hannah Camilleri	239	6.8	
Liberal Democrats	Lorraine King	198	5.7	
Turnout		3,679	38.7	▲7.5
Registered electors		9,501		
Labour hold				
Labour hold				

=== Cricklewood and Mapesbury ===
Cricklewood and Mapesbury (2 seats)
Party	Candidate	Votes	%	±%
Labour	Tariq Dar*	1,295	43.9	
Labour	Gwen Grahl*	1,160	39.4	
Green	William Relton	879	29.8	
Green	Paul Stephens	722	24.5	
Conservative	Usman Cheema	370	12.6	
Reform	Robert Afia	331	11.2	
Conservative	Ashokkumar Patel	318	10.8	
Liberal Democrats	Alyssa Gilbert	295	10.0	
Reform	Vignesh Natarajan	269	9.1	
Liberal Democrats	Anthony Dunn	255	8.7	
Turnout		3,056	32.7	▲2.4
Registered electors				
Labour hold				
Labour hold				

=== Dollis Hill ===
Dollis Hill (3 seats)
Party	Candidate	Votes	%	±%
Labour	Parvez Ahmed*	1,593	42.9	
Labour	Liz Dixon*	1,541	41.5	
Labour	Arshad Mahmood*	1.425	38.3	
Green	Pappy Bowsie	880	23.7	
Green	Jeremy Hadwin	811	21.8	
Green	Bastôn De'Medici-Jaguar	806	21.7	
Liberal Democrats	Alison Hopkins	570	15.3	
Reform	Nigel Green	544	14.6	
Conservative	Osmond Ajibade	480	12.9	
Liberal Democrats	Diana Ayres	455	12.2	
Conservative	Benjamin Goodrick	447	12.0	
Reform	Yogi Patel	434	11.7	
Conservative	Aloka Roy	402	10.8	
Reform	Klaudian Kokoshi	393	10.6	
Liberal Democrats	Suzanne O'Farrell	369	9.9	
Turnout		3,960	28.4	▲0.6
Registered electors		13,904		
Labour hold				
Labour hold				
Labour hold				

=== Harlesden and Kensal Green ===
Harlesden and Kensal Green (3 seats)
Party	Candidate	Votes	%	±%
Labour	Tina Amadi	1,714	41.9	
Green	Amandine Alexandre	1,684	41.1	
Labour	Matt Kelcher*	1,622	39.6	
Labour	Mili Patel*	1,502	36.7	
Green	Ahmed Ahmed	1,483	36.2	
Green	Zengha Wellings-Longmore	1,315	32.1	
Conservative	Alastair McWilliams	390	9.5	
Conservative	Elisabete Lemos	371	9.1	
Liberal Democrats	Charles Brand	340	8.3	
Liberal Democrats	Ben Clarke	339	8.3	
Reform	Said Deria	300	7.3	
Reform	Mansukh Karsan	292	7.1	
Conservative	Padraig Furlong	284	6.9	
Liberal Democrats	Nina Czudej	263	6.4	
Reform	Alfaiz Saiyad	241	5.9	
Independent	Abi Odunsi	140	3.4	
Turnout		4,312	31.1	▲5.7
Registered electors		13,848		
Labour hold				
Green gain from Labour				
Labour hold				

=== Kenton ===
Kenton (3 seats)
Party	Candidate	Votes	%	±%
Conservative	Suresh Kansagra*	2,136	46.1	
Conservative	Anup Patel	1,960	42.3	
Conservative	Sai Madabhushi	1,679	36.3	
Independent	Sunita Hirani*	1,273	27.5	
Green	Hannah Lindoewood	801	17.3	
Green	Ishaan Singh	749	16.2	
Labour Co-op	Janice Long	746	16.1	
Labour Co-op	John Poole	720	15.6	
Labour Co-op	Zubaida Hassan	678	14.6	
Green	Peter Murry	662	14.3	
Reform	Ian Collier	647	14.0	
Reform	Sanjay Radia	597	12.9	
Reform	David Lawes	570	12.3	
Liberal Democrats	George Binney	270	5.8	
Liberal Democrats	Himal Mehta	257	5.6	
Liberal Democrats	Sanjay Nazerali	141	3.0	
Turnout		4,965	39.1	▲3.8
Registered electors		12,694		
Conservative hold				
Conservative hold				
Conservative hold				

=== Kilburn ===
Kilburn (3 seats)
Party	Candidate	Votes	%	±%
Green	Suzanne Gallagher	1,578	44.6	
Green	Stephen Malonga	1,411	39.9	
Green	Paul Ryan	1,347	38.1	
Labour	Rita Conneely*	1,290	36.5	
Labour	Anthony Molloy*	1,134	32.1	
Labour	Leeta Holmes	1,112	31.5	
Reform	Lester Blent	351	9.9	
Conservative	Dai Edwards	337	9.5	
Liberal Democrats	Tilly McAuliffe	332	9.4	
Reform	Andrew Capon	329	9.3	
Liberal Democrats	Edwin Dooley	326	9.2	
Reform	Astrid Wallace	284	8.0	
Conservative	Yashika Manji	278	7.9	
Conservative	Gerald Soames	271	7.7	
Liberal Democrats	Derick Rethans	226	6.4	
Turnout		3,691	31.1	▲6.1
Registered electors		11,861		
Green gain from Labour				
Green gain from Labour				
Green gain from Labour				

=== Kingsbury ===
Kingsbury (2 seats)
Party	Candidate	Votes	%	±%
Labour	Saqib Butt*	870	34.0	
Labour	Jasbinder Bajwa	856	33.4	
Conservative	Prashant Parekh	659	25.7	
Conservative	Ravi Rawat	599	23.4	
Green	Kaci Kerwick	550	21.5	
Green	James Paton	516	20.2	
Reform	Michael Furlong	392	15.3	
Reform	Marius Carp	367	14.3	
Liberal Democrats	Larry Ngan	159	6.2	
Liberal Democrats	Violet Steele	151	5.9	
Turnout		2,665	33.3	▲2.0
Registered electors		8,012		
Labour hold				
Labour hold				

=== Northwick Park ===
Northwick Park (2 seats)
Party	Candidate	Votes	%	±%
Green	Keith Perrin	1,255	39.0	
Green	Nisha Vakani	912	28.3	
Labour	Narinder Bajwa*	883	27.4	
Conservative	Sneha Chaubi	822	25.5	
Conservative	Wilhelmina Mitchell-Murray	681	21.2	
Labour	Shyamala Rajan-Vince	648	20.1	
Reform	Tae-Reece Brown	408	12.7	
Reform	Mahendra Negi	397	12.3	
Liberal Democrats	David Johnson	233	7.2	
Liberal Democrats	Satish Sharma	200	6.2	
Turnout		3,413	38.1	▲4.7
Registered electors		8,938		
Green gain from Labour				
Green gain from Labour				

=== Preston ===
Preston (2 seats)
Party	Candidate	Votes	%	±%
Conservative	Harshadbhai Patel	1,010	36.2	
Conservative	Michael Maurice	894	32.0	
Green	Kaushik Bhattacharya	807	28.9	
Labour Co-op	Daniel Kennelly*	729	26.1	
Labour Co-op	Orleen Hylton*	656	23.5	
Green	Georgina Vanmali	590	21.1	
Reform	Jeffrey Deen	230	8.2	
Reform	Iosif Borsos	223	8.0	
Independent	Nadia Klok	183	6.6	
Liberal Democrats	Valerie Brown	154	5.5	
Liberal Democrats	Martin Lemon	109	3.9	
Turnout		2,935	37.2	▲2.3
Registered electors		7,877		
Conservative gain from Labour				
Conservative gain from Labour				

=== Queens Park ===
Queens Park (3 seats)
Party	Candidate	Votes	%	±%
Liberal Democrats	Deborah Unger	1,992	40.6	
Liberal Democrats	Fiona Mulaisho	1,973	40.2	
Liberal Democrats	Barbara Want	1,910	39.0	
Labour	Marc Harris	1,346	27.5	
Labour	Lesley Smith*	1,308	26.7	
Labour	Neil Nerva*	1,266	25.8	
Green	Felix Ingram	1,115	22.7	
Green	Rasine Nkwaya	986	20.1	
Green	Phillip Weitzman	901	18.4	
Conservative	Owen Matthews	417	8.5	
Conservative	Elsie Ocran	339	6.9	
Reform	Yariv Reeve	303	6.2	
Reform	Sarla Negi	296	6.0	
Conservative	Harshilkumar Prajapati	290	5.9	
Reform	Sonu Sharma	268	5.5	
Turnout		5,004	39.9	▲8.5
Registered electors		12,549		
Liberal Democrats gain from Labour				
Liberal Democrats gain from Labour				
Liberal Democrats gain from Labour				

=== Queensbury ===
Queensbury (3 seats)
Party	Candidate	Votes	%	±%
Conservative	Kanta Mistry*	2,325	54.8	
Conservative	Jayanti Patel*	2,252	53.0	
Conservative	Manoj Mishra	2,162	50.9	
Labour	Simon Cheng	924	21.8	
Labour	Omid Fadakar	872	20.5	
Labour	Candy Nyarko	768	18.1	
Green	Eleanor Corr	633	14.9	
Green	Amy Garvey-Eckett	587	13.8	
Green	Hassan Warsame	517	12.2	
Reform	Mohil Gohil	371	8.7	
Reform	Lalit Mohanty	346	8.1	
Reform	Marius Moisa	337	7.9	
Liberal Democrats	Arvind Patel	231	5.4	
Liberal Democrats	Eileen Barker	207	4.9	
Liberal Democrats	David Hopkins	206	4.9	
Turnout		4,434	36.8	▲2.6
Registered electors		12,048		
Conservative hold				
Conservative hold				
Conservative gain from Labour				

=== Roundwood ===
Roundwood (3 seats)
Party	Candidate	Votes	%	±%
Labour	Samiah Anderson	1,414	45.9	
Labour	Fleur Donnelly-Jackson*	1,377	44.7	
Labour	Jake Rubin*	1,363	44.3	
Green	Harbi Farah	1,013	32.9	
Green	Karishma Patel	941	30.6	
Green	Abdillahi Mohamed	918	29.8	
Reform	Ying Cheng	285	9.3	
Reform	Syed Alam	275	8.9	
Conservative	Ashish Pant	261	8.5	
Liberal Democrats	Virginia Brand	251	8.2	
Conservative	Sat Shekhar	250	8.1	
Reform	Azhar Khan	240	7.8	
Conservative	Anubhav Shukla	230	7.5	
Liberal Democrats	Joel Clarke	225	7.3	
Liberal Democrats	Richard Sisson	191	6.2	
Turnout		3,219	29.3	▲4.2
Registered electors		10,986		
Labour hold				
Labour hold				
Labour hold				

=== Stonebridge ===
Stonebridge (3 seats)
Party	Candidate	Votes	%	±%
Labour	Abdi Aden*	1,399	40.5	
Labour	Promise Knight*	1,243	36.0	
Labour	Trevor Blackman	1,238	35.8	
Green	Daud Hussein	825	23.9	
Green	Sam Angelova	819	23.7	
Green	Sharla Kew	762	22.0	
Independent	Asif Zamir	669	19.4	
Independent	James Rossi	494	14.3	
Conservative	Kathleen Hall	421	12.2	
Independent	Ali Javed	407	11.8	
Conservative	Ajoy Roy	336	9.7	
Conservative	Sellathurai Jeyakumar	332	9.6	
Reform	Sunil Mendonca	292	8.4	
Reform	Aruna Ranganatha	282	8.2	
Reform	Chintan Zaveri	237	6.9	
Liberal Democrats	Mohammad Anwar	209	6.0	
Liberal Democrats	Abdul Matin	151	4.4	
Liberal Democrats	Attila Szep	147	4.3	
Workers Party	Zeeshan Akhtar	107	3.1	
Turnout		3,738	25.5	▲3.2
Registered electors		14,683		
Labour hold				
Labour hold				
Labour hold				

=== Sudbury ===
Sudbury (2 seats)
Party	Candidate	Votes	%	±%
Liberal Democrats	Paul Lorber*	1,776	49.4	
Liberal Democrats	Nirmala Patel	1,523	42.4	
Labour	Teo Benea*	764	21.8	
Labour	Greg Innes	650	18.1	
Conservative	Harish Patel	601	16.7	
Green	Bridget Craghill	441	12.3	
Conservative	Mihir Shah	418	11.6	
Reform	Neha Patel	344	9.6	
Green	Geevaka Silva	338	9.4	
Reform	Himanshu Finaviya	317	8.8	
Turnout		3,728	39.1	▲2.3
Registered electors		9,536		
Liberal Democrats hold				
Liberal Democrats gain from Labour				

=== Tokyngton ===
Tokyngton (2 seats)
Party	Candidate	Votes	%	±%
Labour Co-op	Muhammed Butt*	939	36.3	
Conservative	Shamim Chowdhury	864	33.4	
Conservative	Vijaya Mokal-Parekh	835	32.3	
Labour Co-op	Krupa Sheth*	819	31.7	
Green	Martin Francis	486	18.8	
Green	Effie Woods	385	14.9	
Reform	Vincent McGovern	279	10.8	
Reform	Kevin Nugent	253	9.8	
Liberal Democrats	Peggy Cruickshank	175	6.8	
Liberal Democrats	Shaheen Khan	134	5.2	
Turnout		2,682	34.9	▲0.9
Registered electors		7,695		
Labour hold				
Conservative gain from Labour				

=== Welsh Harp ===
Welsh Harp (3 seats)
Party	Candidate	Votes	%	±%
Labour	Amer Agha*	1,075	29.0	
Conservative	Sapna Chadha	1,052	28.3	
Labour	Iftekhar Ahmed	1,002	27.0	
Conservative	Anand Roy	996	26.8	
Conservative	Mohammed Alghoul	946	25.5	
Labour	Fathima Naleer	909	24.5	
Green	Ahmed Mohamed	770	20.7	
Reform	Chris Palmer	767	20.7	
Green	Richard Porter	759	20.4	
Green	Ruth Washbrook	703	18.9	
Reform	Ash Misal	669	18.0	
Reform	Wojtek Poza	647	17.4	
Liberal Democrats	Peter Corcoran	305	8.2	
Liberal Democrats	Freda Raingold	216	5.8	
Liberal Democrats	Ieva Tomsone	187	5.0	
UKIP	David Howard	69	1.9	
Independent	Elcena Jeffers	65	1.8	
Turnout		3,906	31.9	▲4.9
Registered electors		12,246		
Labour hold				
Conservative gain from Labour				
Labour hold				

=== Wembley Central ===
Wembley Central (3 seats)
Party	Candidate	Votes	%	±%
Liberal Democrats	Daniel Brown	1,918	36.5	
Liberal Democrats	Hetal Jansali	1,824	34.7	
Liberal Democrats	Jigar Shah	1,742	33.2	
Conservative	Rajan Arasu-Seelan*	1,603	30.5	
Conservative	Ryan D'Souza	1,568	29.8	
Conservative	Sushil Rapatwar	1,503	28.6	
Labour	Sonia Shah*	1,035	19.7	
Labour	Ketan Sheth*	971	18.5	
Labour	Anita Thakkar	848	16.1	
Green	Marina McIntyre	516	9.8	
Reform	Jayeshkumar Patel	495	9.4	
Green	Caren Owen	444	8.5	
Reform	Irene Lobo	441	8.4	
Green	Miranda Persaud	441	8.4	
Reform	Brijesh Dokwal	411	7.8	
Turnout		5,518	42.6	▲5.8
Registered electors		12,952		
Liberal Democrats gain from Labour				
Liberal Democrats gain from Labour				
Liberal Democrats gain from Labour				

=== Wembley Hill ===
Wembley Hill (3 seats)
Party	Candidate	Votes	%	±%
Labour	Angela De Souza	1,456	40.7	
Conservative	Floyd do Rosario	1,211	33.8	
Labour	Lloyd McLeish	1,166	32.6	
Conservative	Pranav Patel	1,151	32.2	
Labour	Ishma Moeen*	1,139	31.8	
Conservative	Harmit Vyas	1,054	29.5	
Green	Charles Fernandes	611	17.1	
Green	Camille Ainsworth	601	16.8	
Green	Ibraheem Nawaz	526	14.7	
Reform	Jolene Dias	408	11.4	
Reform	Sandra Assuncao	392	11.0	
Reform	Vanita Mendonca	364	10.2	
Liberal Democrats	Elizabeth Gordon	231	6.5	
Liberal Democrats	Douglas Lee	182	5.1	
Liberal Democrats	Jonah Weisz	135	3.8	
Independent	Andi Porri	106	3.0	
Turnout		3,742	32.7	▲2.6
Registered electors		11,449		
Labour hold				
Conservative gain from Labour				
Labour hold				

=== Wembley Park ===
Wembley Park (2)
Party	Candidate	Votes	%	±%
Green	Iman Ahmadi Moghaddam*	613	36.4	
Green	Najib Warsame	504	30.0	
Labour	Ajmal Akram	476	28.3	
Labour	Apurva Sharma	432	25.7	
Liberal Democrats	Maggie Lau	382	22.7	
Liberal Democrats	Neil Pickles	264	15.7	
Reform	Francis Henry	188	11.2	
Reform	Sushil Dokwal	172	10.2	
Conservative	Elizabeth Johnson	172	10.2	
Conservative	Semi Ideis	161	9.6	
Turnout		1,746	22.9	▲1.9
Registered electors		7,629		
Green gain from Labour				
Green gain from Labour				

=== Willesden Green ===
Willesden Green (3)
Party	Candidate	Votes	%	±%
Labour	Saqlain Choudry*	1,714	40.0	
Green	Mary Mitchell	1,654	38.6	
Labour	George Burn	1,566	36.5	
Green	Tony Ethapemi	1,478	34.5	
Green	Nat Teves	1,380	32.2	
Labour	Prerna Thakkar	1,338	31.2	
Liberal Democrats	Philip Alexander	524	12.2	
Reform	Andrew Beckman	523	12.2	
Liberal Democrats	Mark Cummins	449	10.5	
Conservative	Christopher Geldart	442	10.3	
Reform	Emmanuel Flavius	424	9.9	
Reform	Satish Ramanandan	386	9.0	
Conservative	Mohamed Elnaiem	346	8.1	
Conservative	Retno Widuri	328	7.6	
Liberal Democrats	Ulla Thiessen	316	7.4	
Turnout		4,558	35.8	▲4.9
Registered electors		12,722		
Labour hold				
Green gain from Labour				
Labour hold				
