= 1994 Brent London Borough Council election =

1994 local election in England

← 1990	5 May 1994	1998 →

All 66 seats up for election to Brent London Borough Council 34 seats needed for a majority
- Registered: 157,854
- Turnout: 76,311, 48.34% (▲5.48)

	First party	Second party
Party	Conservative	Labour
Last election	44.11%, 31 seats	39.05%, 29 seats
Seats before	33	24
Seats won	33	28
Seat change	Steady	▲5
Popular vote	68,521	62,755
Percentage	43.96%	40.26%
Swing	▼0.15	▲1.21
	Third party	Fourth party
Party	Liberal Democrats	Ind. Labour Party
Last election	14.09%, 6 seats	N/A
Seats before	7	2
Seats won	5	0
Seat change	▼2	▼2
Popular vote	22,023	952
Percentage	14.13%	0.61%
Swing	▲0.04	New
Council control before election
No Overall Control
Council control after election
No Overall Control

The 1994 Brent Council election took place on 5 May 1994 to elect members of Brent London Borough Council in London, England. The whole council was up for election and the council stayed in no overall control.

== Election result ==
1994 Brent London Borough Council local elections
Party	Seats	Gains	Losses	Net gain/loss	Seats %	Votes %	Votes	+/−
Conservative	33	4	4	Steady	50.00	43.96	68,521	▼0.15
Labour	28	7	3	▲4	42.42	40.26	62,755	▲1.21
Liberal Democrats	5	0	2	▼2	7.58	14.13	22,023	▲0.04
Green	0	0	0	Steady	0.00	0.83	1,296	▼0.48
Ind. Labour Party	0	0	2	▼2	0.00	0.61	952	New
Communist	0	0	0	Steady	0.00	0.21	336	New
Total	66						155,883	

== Ward results ==
(*) - Indicates an incumbent candidate

(†) - Indicates an incumbent candidate standing in a different ward

=== Alperton ===
Alperton (2)
Party	Candidate	Votes	%	±%
Liberal Democrats	John Rattray*	1,545	58.45	▲3.93
Liberal Democrats	Daniel Brown* (Note: Brown replaced Cllr Mike Harskin after his death in 1992)	1,533		
Labour	Ronald Collman	774	26.40	▼6.10
Labour	Stephen Gapp	615		
Conservative	Richard Fernandes	402	15.15	▲2.17
Conservative	Kandiah Sothinathan	396		
Registered electors		5,458		▼853
Turnout		2,834	51.92	▲3.32
Rejected ballots		7	0.25	▲0.18
Liberal Democrats hold				
Liberal Democrats hold				

=== Barham ===
Barham (2)
Party	Candidate	Votes	%	±%
Liberal Democrats	Paul Lorber*	1,248	50.60	▼7.54
Liberal Democrats	Alan Johnston*	1,195		
Labour	Leonard Snow	702	28.32	▲6.15
Labour	Sameeh Zubairi	665		
Conservative	Dineshkumar Mistry	529	21.08	▲1.39
Conservative	Gurmit Rangr	489		
Registered electors		4,911		▼3,742
Turnout		2,550	51.92	▲4.90
Rejected ballots		12	0.47	▲0.37
Liberal Democrats hold				
Liberal Democrats hold				
Liberal Democrats loss (seat eliminated)				

=== Barnhill ===
Barnhill (2)
Party	Candidate	Votes	%	±%
Conservative	William Duffin*	1,691	73.46	▼1.36
Conservative	Irwin van Colle*	1,569		
Labour	Robert Dignam	409	18.07	▲1.77
Labour	Mary Mears	392		
Liberal Democrats	Rosa Gordon	207	8.47	▼0.41
Liberal Democrats	Samuel Leigh	169		
Registered electors		4,556		▼582
Turnout		2,341	51.38	▲3.11
Rejected ballots		5	0.21	▲0.05
Conservative hold				
Conservative hold				

=== Brentwater ===
Brentwater (2)
Party	Candidate	Votes	%	±%
Conservative	Alan Wall*	1,420	46.85	▼7.70
Conservative	Julian Smith	1,372		
Labour	Peter Coghill	1,316	43.09	▲3.36
Labour	Ralph Fox	1,251		
Liberal Democrats	Martin McDonagh	231	6.58	New
Liberal Democrats	Gisele Sukhram	160		
Green	Peter Murry	104	3.48	New
Registered electors		5,794		▼675
Turnout		3,113	53.73	▲11.44
Rejected ballots		13	0.42	▼0.13
Conservative hold				
Conservative hold				

=== Brondesbury Park ===
Brondesbury Park (2)
Party	Candidate	Votes	%	±%
Conservative	Kieran Ambrose	1,051	43.16	▲0.78
Conservative	Albert Wakelin*	1,019		
Labour	Terence Pusey	993	40.16	▲7.08
Labour	Philemon Sealy	932		
Liberal Democrats	Anthony Skelton	267	10.05	▼12.58
Liberal Democrats	Snehrashmi	214		
Green	Donald Lowe	159	6.63	New
Registered electors		5,334		▼445
Turnout		2,393	44.86	▲3.12
Rejected ballots		6	0.25	▼0.08
Conservative hold				
Conservative hold				

=== Carlton ===
Carlton (2)
Party	Candidate	Votes	%	±%
Labour	John Lebor*	1,183	70.68	▲1.56
Labour	Leonard Williams*	1,140		
Conservative	Peter Heath	231	11.68	▼6.29
Conservative	Adetune Omotola	152		
Liberal Democrats	Sharon Virgo	128	7.36	New
Green	Robert Jones	115	7.00	▼6.69
Liberal Democrats	David Noakes	114		
Communist	Nick Clarke	54	3.28	New
Registered electors		4,008		▼640
Turnout		1,712	42.71	▲3.40
Rejected ballots		9	0.53	▲0.37
Labour hold				
Labour hold				

=== Chamberlayne ===
Chamberlayne (2)
Party	Candidate	Votes	%	±%
Labour	Jonathan Godfrey	1,251	44.90	▲7.88
Conservative	John Warren*	1,197	44.11	▼2.81
Conservative	Elizabeth Ormiston*	1,162		
Labour	Asish Sengupta	1,151		
Liberal Democrats	Martin Beecroft	182	5.98	▼0.58
Liberal Democrats	Jack Papasawa	138		
Green	Robert Davis	134	5.01	▼4.49
Registered electors		4,809		▼623
Turnout		2,783	57.87	▲8.64
Rejected ballots		10	0.36	▼0.05
Labour gain from Conservative				
Conservative hold				

=== Church End ===
Church End (2)
Party	Candidate	Votes	%	±%
Labour	Sebastian Long^{†} (Note: Long was a sitting councillor representing the Wembley Central ward)	928	54.76	▼1.67
Labour	Bobby Thomas	902		
Conservative	Vevene Stewart	617	36.86	▲8.62
Conservative	Richard Mendham	615		
Liberal Democrats	June Whittal	162	8.38	▼6.95
Liberal Democrats	Nigel Wolfendale	118		
Registered electors		4,087		▼602
Turnout		1,773	43.38	▲7.85
Rejected ballots		7	0.39	▲0.21
Labour hold				
Labour hold				

=== Cricklewood ===
Cricklewood (2)
Party	Candidate	Votes	%	±%
Conservative	Carol Shaw*	1,488	54.93	▲4.87
Conservative	Jack Sayers*	1,466		
Labour	Mary Finnegan	960	34.29	▼7.81
Labour	Akberkhan Saguroh	884		
Liberal Democrats	Edmond Ryan	218	7.81	▲0.97
Liberal Democrats	Thomas Scannell	202		
Communist	Mark Fischer	80	2.98	New
Registered electors		5,095		▼762
Turnout		2,741	53.80	▲8.95
Rejected ballots		7	0.26	▼0.04
Conservative hold				
Conservative hold				

=== Fryent ===
Fryent (2)
Party	Candidate	Votes	%	±%
Conservative	Joel Games*	1,356	54.57	▼4.63
Conservative	Peter Nelke*	1,293		
Labour	Bertram Crane	826	33.15	▲5.02
Labour	James Moher	784		
Liberal Democrats	Frederick Gordon	303	12.27	▲3.30
Liberal Democrats	Peter Facey	293		
Registered electors		5,477		▼725
Turnout		2,570	46.92	▲0.13
Rejected ballots		5	0.19	▲0.16
Conservative hold				
Conservative hold				

=== Gladstone ===
Gladstone (2)
Party	Candidate	Votes	%	±%
Conservative	Edward Lazarus*	1,434	51.42	▲1.97
Conservative	Francis Torrens*	1,360		
Labour	Kishore Dattani	1,098	40.26	▲0.37
Labour	William Mears	1,090		
Liberal Democrats	Stephen Copestake	130	4.60	New
Green	Stella Collier	121	3.72	▼6.94
Liberal Democrats	Patrick Searson	120		
Green	George Meyer	80		
Registered electors		5,360		▼364
Turnout		2,872	53.58	▲3.46
Rejected ballots		13	0.45	▲0.28
Conservative hold				
Conservative hold				

=== Harlesden ===
Harlesden (2)
Party	Candidate	Votes	%	±%
Labour	Paul Daisley*	1,057	70.69	▲2.63
Labour	Ann Reeder	1,050		
Conservative	William Addo	284	17.51	▼2.56
Conservative	Harry Quainoo	238		
Liberal Democrats	Simon Clarke	144	8.32	▼3.55
Liberal Democrats	Brenda Shuttleworth	103		
Communist	Stanley Kelsey	52	3.49	New
Registered electors		3,894		▼682
Turnout		1,577	40.50	▲6.41
Rejected ballots		2	0.13	▼0.06
Labour hold				
Labour hold				

=== Kensal Rise ===
Kensal Rise (2)
Party	Candidate	Votes	%	±%
Labour	Joan Joseph	809	48.33	▼15.95
Labour	Helga Gladbaum	749		
Conservative	Richard Blackmore	415	23.14	
Conservative	Akua Abban	330		
Ind. Labour Party	Antonio Vidal* (Note: Vidal was elected on a Labour Party ticket in 1990 but in May 1991 he along with several other Labour councillors resigned from the party)	285	14.89	New
Liberal Democrats	Anne Harris	206	10.24	▼7.59
Ind. Labour Party	Manuela Vidal	194		
Liberal Democrats	Rebeka Sellick	123		
Green	Miles Litvinoff	55	3.41	New
Registered electors		3,763		▼692
Turnout		1,686	44.80	▲3.79
Rejected ballots		7	0.42	▲0.04
Labour hold				
Labour gain from Ind. Labour Party				

=== Kenton ===
Kenton (2)
Party	Candidate	Votes	%	±%
Conservative	Arthur Steel*	2,163	70.17	▼3.51
Conservative	David Tobert*	2,104		
Labour	Mary Daly	585	18.19	▲3.50
Labour	Neil Nerva	520		
Liberal Democrats	Benjamin Brown	357	11.64	▲0.01
Liberal Democrats	Annie Bliss	350		
Registered electors		6,400		▼210
Turnout		3,152	49.25	▲0.90
Rejected ballots		6	0.19	▼0.03
Conservative hold				
Conservative hold				

=== Kilburn ===
Kilburn (2)
Party	Candidate	Votes	%	±%
Labour	Peter Pendsay*	1,155	54.67	▼1.85
Labour	Mary Cribbin	1,140		
Conservative	Brendan Harris	660	28.76	▲0.89
Conservative	Ghulam Qureshi	547		
Liberal Democrats	Elizabeth Clark	295	12.24	▼3.37
Liberal Democrats	Martin Panting	219		
Communist	Anne Murphy	91	4.33	New
Registered electors		5,029		▼559
Turnout		2,219	44.12	▲4.02
Rejected ballots		10	0.45	▲0.18
Labour hold				
Labour hold				

=== Kingsbury ===
Kingsbury (2)
Party	Candidate	Votes	%	±%
Conservative	Reginald Colwill	1,620	61.22	▼0.05
Conservative	Gwendolen Tookey*	1,591		
Labour	Frank Carvalho	809	30.56	▲1.35
Labour	John Pitts	794		
Liberal Democrats	Alan Klein	219	8.22	▼1.30
Liberal Democrats	Richard Thomas	212		
Registered electors		5,673		▼484
Turnout		2,810	49.53	▼0.27
Rejected ballots		6	0.21	▼0.08
Conservative hold				
Conservative hold				

=== Manor ===
Manor (2)
Party	Candidate	Votes	%	±%
Labour	Andrew Ammerlaan	1,112	59.18	▲6.08
Labour	Yusuf Giwa*	1,042		
Conservative	Doreen Kelly	567	30.88	▲0.42
Conservative	Reginald Foster	556		
Liberal Democrats	Donald Macarthur	222	9.94	▲3.24
Liberal Democrats	Eric Shuttleworth	139		
Registered electors		4,457		▼728
Turnout		1,986	44.56	
Rejected ballots		6	0.30	▲0.11
Labour hold				
Labour hold				

=== Mapesbury ===
Mapesbury (2)
Party	Candidate	Votes	%	±%
Conservative	Peter Czarniecki*	1,119	48.03	▲1.38
Labour	Janice Long	1,049	44.89	▲3.66
Conservative	Barry Cameron	1,023		
Labour	Noel Thompson	952		
Liberal Democrats	Peter Hamilton	161	7.08	▼5.04
Liberal Democrats	Sadie Donnor	154		
Registered electors		4,779		▼219
Turnout		2,364	49.47	▲7.09
Rejected ballots		13	0.55	▲0.08
Conservative hold				
Labour gain from Conservative				

=== Preston ===
Preston (3)
Party	Candidate	Votes	%	±%
Conservative	Robert Blackman*	2,441	61.84	▼7.98
Conservative	Thomas Taylor*	2,250		
Conservative	Alan Kemp*	2,213		
Labour	Eva Berg-Sinclair	1,081	28.19	▲8.60
Labour	Benjamin Rickman	1,036		
Labour	George Macklin	1,030		
Liberal Democrats	Valerie Goldberg	400	9.97	▼0.62
Liberal Democrats	Adam Adamson	387		
Liberal Democrats	Jacqueline Bunce-Linsell	325		
Registered electors		8,608		▼579
Turnout		3,946	45.84	▲2.65
Rejected ballots		15	0.38	▲0.15
Conservative hold				
Conservative hold				
Conservative hold				

=== Queen's Park ===
Queen's Park (2)
Party	Candidate	Votes	%	±%
Labour	Stephen Crabb	857	41.53	▲6.52
Liberal Democrats	Mark Cummins*	751	36.69	▲3.98
Labour	Michael Heiser	736		
Liberal Democrats	Helen Durnford	657		
Conservative	Richard Fuller	338	17.09	▼5.45
Conservative	Linda Sloane	318		
Green	Diana Young	90	4.69	▼5.05
Registered electors		3,554		▼445
Turnout		1,963	55.23	▲5.62
Rejected ballots		10	0.51	▲0.21
Labour gain from Liberal Democrats				
Liberal Democrats hold				

=== Queensbury ===
Queensbury (2)
Party	Candidate	Votes	%	±%
Conservative	Eric McDonald*	1,041	58.03	▼3.52
Conservative	Navin Patel	1,018		
Labour	Thomas Bryson	618	34.20	▲5.05
Labour	Dorothy Bryson	595		
Liberal Democrats	Hilda Glazer	140	7.77	New
Liberal Democrats	Elizabeth Kornfield	135		
Registered electors		4,154		▼2,209
Turnout		1,907	45.91	▲3.10
Rejected ballots		7	0.37	▲0.26
Conservative hold				
Conservative hold				

=== Roe Green ===
Roe Green (2)
Party	Candidate	Votes	%	±%
Conservative	Chunilal Chavda*	1,460	57.28	▼0.40
Conservative	Peter Golds*	1,444		
Labour	Martin Lindsay	930	35.46	▲1.46
Labour	Ruby Nerva	867		
Liberal Democrats	Vivienne Williamson	186	7.26	▼1.06
Liberal Democrats	Anthony Littman	181		
Registered electors		5,082		▼464
Turnout		2,682	52.77	▲5.75
Rejected ballots		4	0.15	Steady
Conservative hold				
Conservative hold				

=== Roundwood ===
Roundwood (2)
Party	Candidate	Votes	%	±%
Labour	Joyce Bacchus*	1,195	70.47	▼1.39
Labour	Asif Amann	1,052		
Conservative	Dennis Okocha	260	14.67	▼5.15
Conservative	Smart Owaka	207		
Liberal Democrats	Susan Hammond	120	7.40	▼0.92
Green	Joanne Dowson	119	7.46	New
Liberal Democrats	Helen Begbie	115		
Registered electors		4,320		▼503
Turnout		1,709	39.56	▲2.94
Rejected ballots		11	0.64	▲0.30
Labour hold				
Labour hold				

=== St Andrews ===
St Andrews (2)
Party	Candidate	Votes	%	±%
Labour	Richard Harrod*	1,119	49.95	▼0.07
Labour	Bruce Nichols	1,033		
Conservative	Maurice Hearn	969	44.20	▲1.88
Conservative	Grant Shapps	935		
Liberal Democrats	Margaret Calder	134	5.85	▼1.81
Liberal Democrats	Adrian Wilkins	118		
Registered electors		4,395		▼863
Turnout		2,278	51.83	▲12.42
Rejected ballots		8	0.35	▼0.04
Labour hold				
Labour hold				

=== St Raphael's ===
St Raphael's (3)
Party	Candidate	Votes	%	±%
Labour	Jan Etienne	1,179	45.45	▼16.25
Labour	Victor Humphrey	1,101		
Labour	Ann John*	1,065		
Conservative	Emanuel Henry	591	22.91	▼5.44
Conservative	Manibhai Hathalia	554		
Conservative	Theresa Quaye	542		
Ind. Labour Party	Aminah Amalu-Johnson* (Note: Amalu-Johnson was elected as a labour councillor but in May of 1991 she left the party to become an independent)	473	19.28	New
Liberal Democrats	Ian Calder	168	6.32	▼3.63
Liberal Democrats	Christopher Queen	157		
Green	Graham Woodland	148	6.03	New
Liberal Democrats	Andrew Scott	141		
Registered electors		6,394		▼1,084
Turnout		2,321	36.30	▲4.94
Rejected ballots		13	0.56	▲0.01
Labour gain from Conservative				
Labour hold				
Labour gain from Ind. Labour Party				

=== Stonebridge ===
Stonebridge (2)
Party	Candidate	Votes	%	±%
Labour	Colum Moloney	794	61.74	▼4.39
Labour	Tullah Persaud* (Note: Persaud replaced Cllr Harriet Harper after she resigned in 1993)	751		
Conservative	Robert Walters	245	19.41	▼4.53
Conservative	Sunday Oji	240		
Liberal Democrats	John Hammond	142	10.30	▲1.99
Liberal Democrats	Ajoke Adeyeye	115		
Communist	Lee-Anne Bates	59	4.71	New
Green	Jean Woodland	48	3.83	New
Registered electors		3,414		▼1,259
Turnout		1,257	36.82	▲6.82
Rejected ballots		2	0.16	▼0.41
Labour hold				
Labour gain from Conservative				

=== Sudbury ===
Sudbury (3)
Party	Candidate	Votes	%	±%
Conservative	Richard Buckley^{†} (Note: Buckley was a sitting councillor representing the Mapesbury ward)	1,512	45.33	▼22.22
Conservative	Nalayini Fernandes	1,441		
Conservative	Cormach Moore*	1,360		
Liberal Democrats	Joshi Navinchandra	1,161	33.48	▲21.50
Liberal Democrats	Jason Moleman	1,060		
Liberal Democrats	Robert Wharton	965		
Labour	Deborah Cohen	694	21.19	▲0.72
Labour	Steffi Pusey	661		
Labour	Mohammad Hoda	660		
Registered electors		6,851		▼830
Turnout		3,386	49.42	▲7.22
Rejected ballots		17	0.50	▲0.22
Conservative hold				
Conservative hold				
Conservative win (new seat)				

=== Sudbury Court ===
Sudbury Court (2)
Party	Candidate	Votes	%	±%
Conservative	Gerhard Fiegel*	1,269	61.29	▼8.71
Conservative	Vanessa Howells* (Note: Howells named changed to Addinall after she married David Howells in June 1992)	1,260		
Labour	Ronald Lawton	598	27.62	▲5.67
Labour	Kevin Murphy	542		
Liberal Democrats	Susan Lorber	234	11.09	▲3.04
Liberal Democrats	Kanchan Shah	223		
Registered electors		5,093		▼89
Turnout		2,173	42.67	▲4.19
Rejected ballots		8	0.37	▲0.22
Conservative hold				
Conservative hold				

=== Tokyngton ===
Tokyngton (3)
Party	Candidate	Votes	%	±%
Conservative	Nicola Blackman	2,101	52.68	▲8.89
Conservative	Sean O'Sullivan	1,941		
Conservative	Manibhai Patel^{†} (Note: Patel was elected as a Labour Councillor in 1990 but in May 1991 he along with four other Labour councillors left the party. He then joined the Conservative Party He was a sitting councillor representing the Stonebridge ward)	1,846		
Labour	David Davies	1,671	43.99	▼5.48
Labour	Kantilal Patel*	1,664		
Labour	Cyril Shaw*	1,581		
Liberal Democrats	Joseph Fahey	163	3.33	3.41
Liberal Democrats	Roger Fisher	138		
Liberal Democrats	Herbert Singarayer	71		
Registered electors		7,231		▼1,243
Turnout		3,998	55.29	▲8.69
Rejected ballots		12	0.30	▲0.07
Conservative gain from Labour				
Conservative gain from Labour				
Conservative gain from Labour				

=== Wembley Central ===
Wembley Central (2)
Party	Candidate	Votes	%	±%
Labour	Latika Patel	1,130	38.91	▼9.99
Labour	Lincoln Beswick	1,092		
Conservative	Harshadbhai	960	33.56	▲0.73
Conservative	Harshad Barot^{†} (Note: Barot was elected to represent St Raphael's ward. He was originally elected as a Labour councillor, however in May 1991 he along with four other Labour councillors left the party. He then joined the Conservative Party)	956		
Liberal Democrats	Chandubhai Patel	786	27.53	▲14.03
Liberal Democrats	Valerie Brown	785		
Registered electors		5,175		▼660
Turnout		3,006	58.09	▲17.99
Rejected ballots		8	0.27	▼0.03
Labour hold				
Labour hold				

=== Willesden Green ===
Willesden Green (2)
Party	Candidate	Votes	%	±%
Labour	John Duffy	1,210	56.48	▲4.12
Labour	George Crane	1,144		
Conservative	Lincoln Phipps	658	30.81	▲15.64
Conservative	Nizam Ahmad	625		
Liberal Democrats	Rich Benedict	144	6.81	New
Liberal Democrats	Chunilal Hirani	140		
Green	Simone Apsis	123	5.90	New
Registered electors		4,699		▼812
Turnout		2,209	47.01	▲5.22
Rejected ballots		6	0.27	▼0.29
Labour hold				
Labour hold				
