= Brent West =

UK Parliament constituency (since 2024)

- County constituency for the House of Commons
- Interactive map of boundaries from 2024
- Location within Greater London
- County: Greater London
- Electorate: 76,463 (March 2020)
- Borough: Brent
- Major settlements: Wembley

Current constituency
- Created: 2024
- Member of Parliament: Barry Gardiner (Labour)
- Seats: One
- Created from: Brent Central & Brent North

Brent West is a constituency of the House of Commons in the UK Parliament. Created as a result of the 2023 review of Westminster constituencies, Barry Gardiner of the Labour Party has been its MP since the 2024 general election. Gardiner represented the predecessor seat of Brent North from 1997 to 2024.

== Constituency profile ==
The Brent West constituency is located in the Borough of Brent in North London. It is entirely urban and is roughly coterminous with the area of Wembley, which includes the neighbourhoods of Alperton, Sudbury and Preston. The area experienced deprivation and overcrowding in the late 20th century but has recently seen increasing gentrification. Brent is extremely ethnically diverse. People born outside the United Kingdom make up 56% of residents, the highest rate of any local authority in the country. Brent has the highest proportion of Irish people in Great Britain and the country's largest Brazilian community.

Residents of Brent West generally have similar levels of wealth and education to London as a whole, but high levels of unskilled employment and deprivation, particularly in the south of the constituency around Alperton. Like the rest of Brent, the constituency is ethnically diverse. Around half of residents are of Asian ethnicity, primarily Indian. Hindus make up 28% of the population and Muslims are 18%. White people make up 26% of residents and most are not of British origin. Black people are 12% and other ethnic groups are 9%.

At the local borough council, most areas in the constituency are represented by Labour Party councillors, although Conservatives were elected in the wealthier area around Preston and Liberal Democrats were elected in parts of Sudbury and Alperton. An estimated 57% of voters in Brent West favoured remaining in the European Union in the 2016 referendum, higher than the country as a whole but slightly lower than the rest of London.

== Boundaries ==
The constituency comprises the following wards of the London Borough of Brent (as they existed on 4 May 2022):

- Alperton, Barnhill, Kenton, Northwick Park, Preston, Sudbury, Tokyngton, Wembley Central, Wembley Hill and Wembley Park.

The seat comprises the majority of the abolished constituency of Brent North, together with a small part (Tokyngton and Wembley Park) of Brent Central (also abolished).

== Elections ==
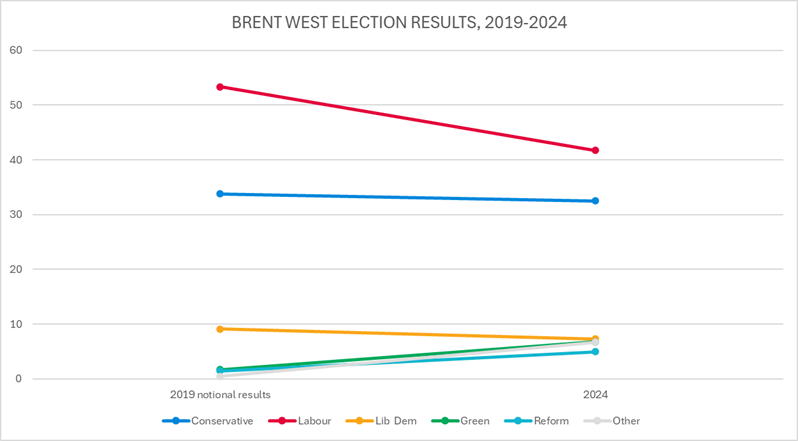
Election results 2019-2024

=== Elections in the 2020s ===
General election 2024: Brent West
Party	Candidate	Votes	%	±%
Labour	Barry Gardiner	17,258	41.7	–11.6
Conservative	Sushil Rapatwar	13,465	32.5	–1.3
Liberal Democrats	Paul Lorber	3,013	7.3	–1.8
Green	Bastôn De'Medici-Jaguar	2,805	6.8	+5.1
Workers Party	Nadia Klok	2,774	6.7	N/A
Reform	Ian Collier	2,061	5.0	+3.5
Majority		3,793	9.2	–10.3
Turnout		41,376	51.8	–11.5
Registered electors		79,937		
Labour hold		Swing	▼5.2	

=== Elections in the 2010s ===
2019 notional result (Note: Estimate of the 2019 general election result as if the revised boundaries recommended under the 2023 boundary review were in place)
Party	Vote	%
Labour	25,792	53.3
Conservative	16,361	33.8
Liberal Democrats	4,408	9.1
Green	826	1.7
Brexit Party	750	1.5
Others	270	0.5
Majority	9,431	19.5
Turnout	48,407	63.3
Electorate	76,463	

== See also ==
- Parliamentary constituencies in London
