= 1998 Brent London Borough Council election =

1998 local election in England

- 7 May 1998

All 66 seats up for election to Brent London Borough Council 34 seats needed for a majority
- Registered: 169,698
- Turnout: 62,548, 36.86% (▼11.48)

| | First party | Second party |
|---|---|---|
| Leader | Paul A. Daisley | Robert J. Blackman |
| Party | Labour | Conservative |
| Leader since | 1993 | 1990 |
| Leader's seat | Harlesden | Preston |
| Last election | 28 seats, 40.26% | 33 seats, 43.96% |
| Seats before | 28 | 32 |
| Seats won | 43 | 19 |
| Seat change | ▲15 | ▼14 |
| Popular vote | 59,835 | 46,045 |
| Percentage | 47.74% | 36.74% |
| Swing | ▲7.48 | ▼7.22 |
| | Third party | Fourth party |
| Leader | Unknown | Chunilal V. Chavda (Note: Chavda was the defacto leader as he was the only member on the council) |
| Party | Liberal Democrats | Ind. Conservative |
| Leader since | Unknown | Unknown |
| Leader's seat | Unknown | Preston |
| Last election | 5 seats, 14.13% | Didn't run |
| Seats before | 5 | 1 |
| Seats won | 4 | 0 |
| Seat change | ▼1 | Didn't run |
| Popular vote | 17,602 | 279 |
| Percentage | 14.04% | 0.22% |
| Swing | ▼0.09 | New |
Council control before election
No Overall Control
Council control after election
Labour

The 1998 Brent London Borough Council election took place on 7 May 1998 to elect members of Brent London Borough Council in London, England. The whole council was up for election and the Labour Party gained overall control of the council from no overall control.

== Background ==
Before the election Labour ran the council with the support of the Liberal Democrats. However the Conservatives targeted the council with the Conservative Shadow Secretary of State for the Environment, Transport and the Regions, Norman Fowler, predicting that the Conservatives would make gains in Brent. The Conservatives required a 1% swing from the 1994 election to win a majority on the council, where previously no party had a majority.

There was one by-election in the intervening years, however it didn't result in the seat changing hands. In addition to this, a member of the Conservatives became an independent, meaning the composition of the council just before the election was as follows:

↓
| 28 | 5 | 1 | 32 |
| Labour | Lib Dem | Ind. Con | Con |

== Election result ==
The Labour party took a 20-seat majority on the council after gaining 15 seats, with the gains including taking all of the seats in Fryent and Roe Green wards and 1 seat in Queensbury ward from the Conservatives. The Conservatives put their defeat in Brent down to the popularity of the national Labour government and unhappiness at the closure of Edgware General Hospital's casualty department by the previous Conservative government. The Liberal Democrats failed to make gains and dropped from 5 to 4 councillors. Overall turnout at the election was 36.8%, down from 48.3% in 1994.

Brent local election result 1998
| Party | Seats | Gains | Losses | Net gain/loss | Seats % | Votes % | Votes | +/− |
|---|---|---|---|---|---|---|---|---|
| Labour | 43 | 16 | 1 | ▲15 | 65.15 | 47.74 | 59,835 | ▲7.48 |
| Conservative | 19 | 1 | 15 | ▼14 | 28.79 | 36.74 | 46,045 | ▼7.22 |
| Liberal Democrats | 4 | 0 | 1 | ▼1 | 6.06 | 14.04 | 17,602 | ▼0.09 |
| Green | 0 | 0 | 0 | Steady | 0.00 | 0.57 | 716 | ▼0.26 |
| Independent | 0 | 0 | 0 | Steady | 0.00 | 0.57 | 710 | New |
| Ind. Con | 0 | 0 | 0 | Steady | 0.00 | 0.22 | 279 | New |
| Socialist Alliance | 0 | 0 | 0 | Steady | 0.00 | 0.12 | 145 | New |
| Total | 66 | | | | | | 125,332 | |

After the elections, the composition of the council was as follows:

↓
| 43 | 4 | 19 |
| Labour | Lib Dem | Con |

== Ward results ==
(*) - Indicates an incumbent candidate

(†) - Indicates an incumbent candidate standing in a different ward

=== Alperton ===
Alperton (2)
| Party | Candidate | Votes | % | ±% |
|---|---|---|---|---|
| Liberal Democrats | Daniel Brown* | 1,310 | 54.04 | ▼4.41 |
| Liberal Democrats | John Rattray* | 1,227 | | |
| Labour | Ronald Collman | 720 | 26.86 | ▲0.46 |
| Labour | Leon Turini | 541 | | |
| Conservative | Dineshkumar Mistry | 271 | 9.90 | ▼5.25 |
| Independent | Ratnasabapathy Ananthanathan | 216 | 9.20 | New |
| Conservative | Everton Williams | 194 | | |
| Registered electors | | 5,684 | | ▲226 |
| Turnout | | 2,495 | 43.90 | ▼8.02 |
| Rejected ballots | | 19 | 0.76 | ▲0.51 |
| Liberal Democrats hold | | | | |
| Liberal Democrats hold | | | | |

=== Barham ===
Barham (2)
| Party | Candidate | Votes | % | ±% |
|---|---|---|---|---|
| Liberal Democrats | Paul Lorber* | 1,023 | 45.67 | ▼4.93 |
| Liberal Democrats | Anthony Hughes | 898 | | |
| Labour | Victor Humphrey^{†} (Note: Humphrey was a sitting councillor representing the St Raphael's ward) | 603 | 26.58 | ▼1.74 |
| Conservative | Christie Fernandes | 594 | 27.75 | ▲6.67 |
| Conservative | Bruce Embleton | 573 | | |
| Labour | Anton Singarayer | 515 | | |
| Registered electors | | 5,079 | | ▲168 |
| Turnout | | 2,280 | 44.89 | ▼7.03 |
| Rejected ballots | | 14 | 0.61 | ▲0.14 |
| Liberal Democrats hold | | | | |
| Liberal Democrats hold | | | | |

=== Barnhill ===
Barnhill (2)
| Party | Candidate | Votes | % | ±% |
|---|---|---|---|---|
| Conservative | Irwin Van Colle* | 1,066 | 63.08 | ▼10.38 |
| Conservative | Suresh Kansagra | 1,013 | | |
| Labour | Conal O'Connor | 467 | 27.73 | ▲9.66 |
| Labour | Maureen Queally | 467 | | |
| Liberal Democrats | Sydney Leigh | 157 | 8.59 | ▲0.12 |
| Liberal Democrats | Ishaq Mohammed | 126 | | |
| Registered electors | | 4,893 | | ▲337 |
| Turnout | | 1,760 | 35.97 | ▼15.41 |
| Rejected ballots | | 16 | 0.91 | ▲0.70 |
| Conservative hold | | | | |
| Conservative hold | | | | |

=== Brentwater ===
Brentwater (2)
| Party | Candidate | Votes | % | ±% |
|---|---|---|---|---|
| Labour | Ralph Fox | 1,409 | 52.62 | ▲5.77 |
| Labour | Akbertkhan Sarguroh | 1,237 | | |
| Conservative | Alan Wall* | 1,026 | 39.88 | ▼3.21 |
| Conservative | Ian Lyon | 979 | | |
| Liberal Democrats | Diana Ayres | 206 | 7.50 | ▲0.92 |
| Liberal Democrats | Gisele Sukhram | 171 | | |
| Registered electors | | 6,264 | | ▲470 |
| Turnout | | 2,709 | 43.25 | ▼10.48 |
| Rejected ballots | | 16 | 0.59 | ▲0.17 |
| Labour gain from Conservative | | | | |
| Labour gain from Conservative | | | | |

=== Brondesbury Park ===
Brondesbury Park (2)
| Party | Candidate | Votes | % | ±% |
|---|---|---|---|---|
| Labour | Keith Ferry | 1,068 | 49.48 | ▲9.32 |
| Labour | Gabrielle Kagan | 1,054 | | |
| Conservative | Albert Wakelin* | 762 | 34.09 | ▼9.07 |
| Conservative | Ghulam Qureshi | 700 | | |
| Liberal Democrats | Madeleine Gaskin | 224 | 8.98 | ▼1.07 |
| Liberal Democrats | Chunilal Hirani | 161 | | |
| Green | Simone Aspis | 160 | 7.46 | ▲0.83 |
| Registered electors | | 6,102 | | ▲768 |
| Turnout | | 2,187 | 35.84 | ▼9.02 |
| Rejected ballots | | 21 | 0.96 | ▲0.71 |
| Labour gain from Conservative | | | | |
| Labour gain from Conservative | | | | |

=== Carlton ===
Carlton (2)
| Party | Candidate | Votes | % | ±% |
|---|---|---|---|---|
| Labour | Mary Arnold | 874 | 77.42 | ▲6.74 |
| Labour | John Lebor* | 768 | | |
| Conservative | Shane Andrews | 165 | 13.44 | ▲1.76 |
| Conservative | Ibrar Qureshi | 120 | | |
| Liberal Democrats | Zoe Ryle | 97 | 9.15 | ▲1.79 |
| Registered electors | | 4,061 | | ▲53 |
| Turnout | | 1,169 | 28.79 | ▼13.92 |
| Rejected ballots | | 25 | 2.14 | ▲1.61 |
| Labour hold | | | | |
| Labour hold | | | | |

=== Chamberlayn ===
Chamberlayne (2)
| Party | Candidate | Votes | % | ±% |
|---|---|---|---|---|
| Labour | Charles Lemmon | 1,196 | 49.53 | ▲4.63 |
| Labour | Jon Godfrey* | 1,138 | | |
| Conservative | Christopher Rees | 879 | 37.01 | ▼7.10 |
| Conservative | John Warren* | 865 | | |
| Liberal Democrats | Jonathan Pincus | 165 | 6.79 | ▲0.81 |
| Green | Philip Dymond | 157 | 6.67 | ▲1.66 |
| Liberal Democrats | Jack Papasavva | 155 | | |
| Registered electors | | 5,353 | | ▲544 |
| Turnout | | 2,422 | 45.25 | ▼12.62 |
| Rejected ballots | | 20 | 0.83 | ▲0.47 |
| Labour hold | | | | |
| Labour gain from Conservative | | | | |

=== Church End ===
Church End (2)
| Party | Candidate | Votes | % | ±% |
|---|---|---|---|---|
| Labour | Sebastian Long* | 624 | 49.96 | ▼4.80 |
| Labour | Bobby Thomas* | 617 | | |
| Conservative | Ratilal Shah | 518 | 39.90 | ▲3.04 |
| Conservative | David Gauke | 473 | | |
| Liberal Democrats | Dudley Gaskin | 127 | 10.14 | ▲1.76 |
| Liberal Democrats | Robert Wenley | 125 | | |
| Registered electors | | 4,572 | | ▲485 |
| Turnout | | 1,389 | 30.38 | ▼13.00 |
| Rejected ballots | | 10 | 0.72 | ▲0.33 |
| Labour hold | | | | |
| Labour hold | | | | |

=== Cricklewood ===
Cricklewood (2)
| Party | Candidate | Votes | % | ±% |
|---|---|---|---|---|
| Conservative | Carol Shaw* | 1,282 | 55.03 | ▲0.10 |
| Conservative | Jack Sayers* | 1,191 | | |
| Labour | George Crane^{†} (Note: Crane was a sitting councillor representing the Willesden Green ward) | 853 | 37.69 | ▲3.40 |
| Labour | James Powney | 841 | | |
| Liberal Democrats | Christian Baker | 200 | 7.28 | ▲0.53 |
| Liberal Democrats | Azwar Mohammed | 127 | | |
| Registered electors | | 6,140 | | ▲1,045 |
| Turnout | | 2,419 | 39.40 | ▼14.40 |
| Rejected ballots | | 17 | 0.70 | ▲0.44 |
| Conservative hold | | | | |
| Conservative hold | | | | |

=== Fryent ===
Fryent (2)
| Party | Candidate | Votes | % | ±% |
|---|---|---|---|---|
| Labour | Lawrence Pardoe | 1,197 | 52.27 | ▲19.12 |
| Labour | Asish Sengupta | 1,027 | | |
| Conservative | Joel Games* | 839 | 37.74 | ▼19.83 |
| Conservative | Peter Nelke* | 767 | | |
| Liberal Democrats | Frederick Gordon | 248 | 9.99 | ▼2.28 |
| Liberal Democrats | Steven Billam | 177 | | |
| Registered electors | | 5,899 | | ▲422 |
| Turnout | | 2,310 | 39.16 | ▼7.76 |
| Rejected ballots | | 18 | 0.78 | ▲0.59 |
| Labour gain from Conservative | | | | |
| Labour gain from Conservative | | | | |

=== Gladstone ===
Gladstone (2)
| Party | Candidate | Votes | % | ±% |
|---|---|---|---|---|
| Labour | Michael Lyon | 1,069 | 48.63 | ▲8.37 |
| Labour | Abdul Sattar-Butt | 964 | | |
| Conservative | Edward Lazarus* | 959 | 44.65 | ▼6.77 |
| Conservative | Francis Torrens* | 908 | | |
| Liberal Democrats | William Anderson | 170 | 6.72 | ▲2.12 |
| Liberal Democrats | Alastair MacEwan | 111 | | |
| Registered electors | | 5,574 | | ▲214 |
| Turnout | | 2,222 | 39.86 | ▼13.72 |
| Rejected ballots | | 16 | 0.72 | ▲0.27 |
| Labour gain from Conservative | | | | |
| Labour gain from Conservative | | | | |

=== Harlesden ===
Harlesden (2)
| Party | Candidate | Votes | % | ±% |
|---|---|---|---|---|
| Labour | Paul Daisley* | 819 | 75.59 | ▲4.90 |
| Labour | Ann Reeder* | 757 | | |
| Conservative | Sanjaykumar Patel | 148 | 13.96 | ▼3.55 |
| Conservative | Rosaline Owaka | 143 | | |
| Liberal Democrats | Joseph Fahey | 127 | 10.45 | ▲2.13 |
| Liberal Democrats | Brenda Shuttleworth | 91 | | |
| Registered electors | | 3,977 | | ▲83 |
| Turnout | | 1,170 | 29.42 | ▼11.08 |
| Rejected ballots | | 9 | 0.77 | ▲0.64 |
| Labour hold | | | | |
| Labour hold | | | | |

=== Kensal Rise ===
Kensal Rise (2)
| Party | Candidate | Votes | % | ±% |
|---|---|---|---|---|
| Labour | Bertha Joseph* | 910 | 76.48 | ▲28.15 |
| Labour | Helga Gladbaum* | 833 | | |
| Liberal Democrats | Geoffrey Walley | 160 | 12.90 | ▲2.66 |
| Liberal Democrats | Eamon Ryan | 134 | | |
| Conservative | Kenneth Sinclair | 126 | 10.62 | ▼12.52 |
| Conservative | Smart Owaka | 116 | | |
| Registered electors | | 4,058 | | ▲295 |
| Turnout | | 1,256 | 30.95 | ▼13.85 |
| Rejected ballots | | 14 | 1.11 | ▲0.69 |
| Labour hold | | | | |
| Labour hold | | | | |

=== Kenton ===
Kenton (2)
| Party | Candidate | Votes | % | ±% |
|---|---|---|---|---|
| Conservative | Arthur Steel* | 1,480 | 59.79 | ▼10.38 |
| Conservative | Sean O'Sullivan^{†} (Note: O'Sullivan was a sitting councillor representing the Tokyngton ward) | 1,410 | | |
| Labour | Dorothy Bryson | 733 | 29.91 | ▲11.72 |
| Labour | Mary Daly | 713 | | |
| Liberal Democrats | Annie Bliss | 256 | 10.30 | ▼1.34 |
| Liberal Democrats | Bridget Kelly | 242 | | |
| Registered electors | | 6,962 | | ▲562 |
| Turnout | | 2,485 | 35.69 | ▼13.56 |
| Rejected ballots | | 14 | 0.68 | ▲0.49 |
| Conservative hold | | | | |
| Conservative hold | | | | |

=== Kilburn ===
Kilburn (2)
| Party | Candidate | Votes | % | ±% |
|---|---|---|---|---|
| Labour | Peter Pendsay* | 1,023 | 66.36 | ▲11.69 |
| Labour | Mary Cribbin* | 955 | | |
| Liberal Democrats | Elizabeth Clark | 272 | 14.22 | ▲1.98 |
| Conservative | Stephen Batten | 264 | 15.80 | ▼12.96 |
| Conservative | Mohammad Chugtai | 207 | | |
| Liberal Democrats | Roger Crouch | 152 | | |
| Socialist Alliance | Philip Kent | 54 | 3.62 | New |
| Registered electors | | 4,847 | | ▼182 |
| Turnout | | 1,595 | 32.91 | ▼11.21 |
| Rejected ballots | | 18 | 1.13 | ▲0.68 |
| Labour hold | | | | |
| Labour hold | | | | |

=== Kingsbury ===
Kingsbury (2)
| Party | Candidate | Votes | % | ±% |
|---|---|---|---|---|
| Conservative | Reginald Colwill* | 1,084 | 51.95 | ▼9.27 |
| Conservative | Carupiah Selvarajah | 1,004 | | |
| Labour | William Mears | 834 | 40.18 | ▲9.62 |
| Labour | Malcolm Gosling | 781 | | |
| Liberal Democrats | Alan Klein | 180 | 7.86 | ▼0.36 |
| Liberal Democrats | Rodney Saunders | 136 | | |
| Registered electors | | 6,115 | | ▲442 |
| Turnout | | 2,234 | 36.53 | ▼13.00 |
| Rejected ballots | | 19 | 0.85 | ▲0.64 |
| Conservative hold | | | | |
| Conservative hold | | | | |

=== Manor ===
Manor (2)
| Party | Candidate | Votes | % | ±% |
|---|---|---|---|---|
| Labour | Andrew Ammerlaan* | 923 | 60.53 | ▲1.35 |
| Labour | Yusuf Giwa* | 773 | | |
| Conservative | Akua Abban-Davis | 230 | 14.02 | ▼16.85 |
| Liberal Democrats | John Chapman | 228 | 15.17 | ▲5.23 |
| Liberal Democrats | Donald MacArthur | 197 | | |
| Conservative | Harry Quainoo | 163 | | |
| Green | Sally Ibbotson | 144 | 10.28 | New |
| Registered electors | | 4,812 | | |
| Turnout | | 1,459 | 30.32 | ▼14.24 |
| Rejected ballots | | 15 | 1.03 | ▲0.73 |
| Labour hold | | | | |
| Labour hold | | | | |

=== Mapesbury ===
Mapesbury (2)
| Party | Candidate | Votes | % | ±% |
|---|---|---|---|---|
| Labour | Janice Long* | 1,081 | 51.41 | ▲6.52 |
| Labour | Ian Bellia | 926 | | |
| Conservative | Peter Czarniecki* | 784 | 36.99 | ▼11.04 |
| Conservative | Pamela O'Brien | 660 | | |
| Liberal Democrats | James Heath | 128 | 5.51 | ▼1.57 |
| Green | Donald Lowe | 119 | 6.10 | New |
| Liberal Democrats | Emma Talbot | 87 | | |
| Registered electors | | 5,248 | | ▲469 |
| Turnout | | 1,984 | 37.81 | ▼11.66 |
| Rejected ballots | | 12 | 0.61 | ▲0.06 |
| Labour gain from Conservative | | | | |
| Labour hold | | | | |

=== Preston ===
Preston (3)
| Party | Candidate | Votes | % | ±% |
|---|---|---|---|---|
| Conservative | Bob Blackman* | 1,922 | 53.90 | ▼7.94 |
| Conservative | Harshadbhai Patel* (Note: Patel was elected in a by-election triggered by the death of Cllr Alan Kemp in 1996) | 1,734 | | |
| Conservative | Thomas Taylor* | 1,731 | | |
| Labour | Eileen Macklin | 1,019 | 29.94 | ▲1.75 |
| Labour | Cyril McGovern | 1,014 | | |
| Labour | George Macklin | 959 | | |
| Ind. Conservative | Chunilal Chavda^{†} (Note: Chavda was a sitting councillor representing the Roe Green ward) | 279 | 8.37 | New |
| Liberal Democrats | Richard Thomas | 260 | 7.79 | ▼2.18 |
| Liberal Democrats | Jacqueline Bunce-Linsell | 259 | | |
| Registered electors | | 9,156 | | ▲548 |
| Turnout | | 3,298 | 36.02 | ▼9.82 |
| Rejected ballots | | 21 | 0.64 | ▲0.26 |
| Conservative hold | | | | |
| Conservative hold | | | | |
| Conservative hold | | | | |

=== Queen's Park ===
Queen's Park (2)
| Party | Candidate | Votes | % | ±% |
|---|---|---|---|---|
| Labour | Neil Nerva | 1,038 | 66.16 | ▲24.63 |
| Labour | Sarah Walker | 1,005 | | |
| Liberal Democrats | Anthony Spitzel | 340 | 20.27 | ▼16.42 |
| Liberal Democrats | Robert Wharton | 286 | | |
| Conservative | Wendy MacHugh | 217 | 13.57 | ▼3.52 |
| Conservative | Jennifer Seaton-Brown | 202 | | |
| Registered electors | | 3,912 | | ▲358 |
| Turnout | | 1,632 | 41.72 | ▼13.51 |
| Rejected ballots | | 18 | 1.10 | ▲0.59 |
| Labour hold | | | | |
| Labour gain from Liberal Democrats | | | | |

=== Queensbury ===
Queensbury (2)
| Party | Candidate | Votes | % | ±% |
|---|---|---|---|---|
| Labour | Rameshchandra Patel | 832 | 49.81 | ▼8.22 |
| Conservative | Eric McDonald* | 738 | 45.10 | ▲10.90 |
| Labour | Anthony Burleton | 733 | | |
| Conservative | Mohammad Rizvi | 679 | | |
| Liberal Democrats | Hilda Glazer | 94 | 5.09 | ▼2.68 |
| Liberal Democrats | Elizabeth Kornfeld | 66 | | |
| Registered electors | | 4,480 | | ▲326 |
| Turnout | | 1,732 | 38.66 | ▼7.25 |
| Rejected ballots | | 11 | 0.64 | ▲0.27 |
| Labour gain from Conservative | | | | |
| Conservative hold | | | | |

=== Roe Green ===
Roe Green (2)
| Party | Candidate | Votes | % | ±% |
|---|---|---|---|---|
| Labour | William Dromey | 1,183 | 54.84 | ▼2.44 |
| Labour | John Duffy^{†} (Note: Duffy was a sitting councillor representing the Willesden Green ward) | 1,178 | | |
| Conservative | Navinchandra Patel | 855 | 38.98 | ▲3.52 |
| Conservative | Peter Golds* | 823 | | |
| Liberal Democrats | Vivienne Williamson | 155 | 6.18 | ▼1.08 |
| Liberal Democrats | Anthony Littman | 111 | | |
| Registered electors | | 5,653 | | ▲571 |
| Turnout | | 2,321 | 41.06 | ▼11.71 |
| Rejected ballots | | 11 | 0.47 | ▲0.32 |
| Labour gain from Conservative | | | | |
| Labour gain from Conservative | | | | |

=== Roundwood ===
Roundwood (2)
| Party | Candidate | Votes | % | ±% |
|---|---|---|---|---|
| Labour | Joyce Bacchus* | 753 | 52.86 | ▼17.61 |
| Labour | Mohammad Zakriya | 625 | | |
| Independent | James Fitzpatrick | 416 | 31.91 | New |
| Conservative | Jean Chopping | 135 | 10.20 | ▼4.47 |
| Conservative | Abid Ashary | 131 | | |
| Liberal Democrats | Benedict Rich | 74 | 5.03 | ▼2.37 |
| Liberal Democrats | Mohammad Khokhar | 57 | | |
| Registered electors | | 4,265 | | ▼55 |
| Turnout | | 1,262 | 29.59 | ▼9.97 |
| Rejected ballots | | 15 | 1.19 | ▲0.55 |
| Labour hold | | | | |
| Labour hold | | | | |

=== St Andrews ===
St Andrews (2)
| Party | Candidate | Votes | % | ±% |
|---|---|---|---|---|
| Labour | Richard Harrod* | 690 | 47.72 | ▼2.23 |
| Conservative | James O'Sullivan | 636 | 46.19 | ▲1.99 |
| Conservative | Naginbhai Parmar | 607 | | |
| Labour | Aston Walters | 594 | | |
| Liberal Democrats | Helen Durnford | 86 | 6.09 | ▲0.24 |
| Liberal Democrats | Bernard Luby | 78 | | |
| Registered electors | | 3,817 | | ▼578 |
| Turnout | | 1,462 | 38.30 | ▼13.53 |
| Rejected ballots | | 12 | 0.82 | ▲0.47 |
| Labour hold | | | | |
| Conservative gain from Labour | | | | |

=== St Raphael's ===
St. Raphael's (3)
| Party | Candidate | Votes | % | ±% |
|---|---|---|---|---|
| Labour | David Coughlin | 1,125 | 71.27 | ▲25.82 |
| Labour | Ann John* | 1,106 | | |
| Labour | Kantibhai Patel | 996 | | |
| Conservative | Emanuel Henry | 317 | 18.28 | ▼4.63 |
| Conservative | Natalie Colwill | 283 | | |
| Conservative | Manibhai Hathalia | 228 | | |
| Liberal Democrats | Eileen Barker | 208 | 10.45 | ▲4.13 |
| Liberal Democrats | Christopher Queen | 146 | | |
| Liberal Democrats | Andrew Scott | 119 | | |
| Registered electors | | 7,132 | | ▲738 |
| Turnout | | 1,763 | 24.72 | ▼11.58 |
| Rejected ballots | | 28 | 1.59 | ▲1.03 |
| Labour hold | | | | |
| Labour hold | | | | |
| Labour hold | | | | |

=== Stonebridge ===
Stonebridge (2)
| Party | Candidate | Votes | % | ±% |
|---|---|---|---|---|
| Labour | Columbus Moloney* | 568 | 62.91 | ▲1.17 |
| Labour | Robert Hamadi | 543 | | |
| Liberal Democrats | Rosa Gordon | 142 | 14.55 | ▲4.25 |
| Conservative | Bhiku Patel | 133 | 13.70 | ▼5.71 |
| Liberal Democrats | Leslie Lewis | 115 | | |
| Conservative | Abdul Rehman | 109 | | |
| Independent | Kanwal Shergill | 78 | 8.84 | New |
| Registered electors | | 3,491 | | ▲77 |
| Turnout | | 992 | 28.42 | ▼8.40 |
| Rejected ballots | | 17 | 1.71 | ▲1.55 |
| Labour hold | | | | |
| Labour hold | | | | |

=== Sudbury ===
Sudbury (3)
| Party | Candidate | Votes | % | ±% |
|---|---|---|---|---|
| Conservative | Uma Fernandes* | 1,086 | 36.02 | ▼9.31 |
| Conservative | Cormach Moore* | 1,010 | | |
| Conservative | Neil Rands | 990 | | |
| Labour | Christopher Alexis | 984 | 31.16 | ▲9.97 |
| Liberal Democrats | John Lewis | 975 | 32.82 | ▼0.66 |
| Liberal Democrats | Violet Steele | 944 | | |
| Liberal Democrats | Henry Melzack | 893 | | |
| Labour | Mohammad Hoda | 845 | | |
| Labour | Lewis Hodgetts | 841 | | |
| Registered electors | | 7,426 | | ▲575 |
| Turnout | | 3,077 | 41.44 | ▼7.98 |
| Rejected ballots | | 20 | 0.65 | ▲0.50 |
| Conservative hold | | | | |
| Conservative hold | | | | |
| Conservative hold | | | | |

=== Sudbury Court ===
Sudbury Court (2)
| Party | Candidate | Votes | % | ±% |
|---|---|---|---|---|
| Conservative | Gideon Fiegel* | 985 | 49.43 | ▼11.86 |
| Conservative | Vanessa Howells* | 927 | | |
| Labour | Mary Finnegan | 864 | 42.19 | ▲14.57 |
| Labour | Deborah Kafka | 768 | | |
| Liberal Democrats | Sue Lorber | 175 | 8.37 | ▼2.72 |
| Liberal Democrats | Alan Johnston^{†} (Note: Johnston was a sitting councillor representing the Barham ward) | 149 | | |
| Registered electors | | 5,955 | | ▲862 |
| Turnout | | 2,051 | 34.44 | ▼8.23 |
| Rejected ballots | | 18 | 0.88 | ▲0.51 |
| Conservative hold | | | | |
| Conservative hold | | | | |

=== Tokyngton ===
Tokyngton (3)
| Party | Candidate | Votes | % | ±% |
|---|---|---|---|---|
| Labour | Alec Castle | 1,451 | 49.68 | ▲5.69 |
| Labour | Orugbani Douglas | 1,427 | | |
| Conservative | Nicola Blackman* | 1,365 | 44.32 | ▼8.36 |
| Labour | Dhirajlal Kataria | 1,318 | | |
| Conservative | Janet Graham | 1,227 | | |
| Conservative | Manibhai Patel* | 1,152 | | |
| Liberal Democrats | Diana Lewis | 198 | 6.00 | ▲2.67 |
| Liberal Democrats | Chandrakant Patel | 190 | | |
| Liberal Democrats | Nathalal Hingorani | 119 | | |
| Registered electors | | 7,632 | | ▲401 |
| Turnout | | 3,059 | 40.08 | ▼15.21 |
| Rejected ballots | | 14 | 0.46 | ▲0.16 |
| Labour gain from Conservative | | | | |
| Labour gain from Conservative | | | | |
| Conservative hold | | | | |

=== Wembley Central ===
Wembley Central (2)
| Party | Candidate | Votes | % | ±% |
|---|---|---|---|---|
| Labour | Lincoln Beswick* | 1,035 | 41.31 | ▲2.40 |
| Labour | Tullah Persaud^{†} (Note: Persaud was a sitting councillor representing the Stonebridge ward) | 905 | | |
| Liberal Democrats | Chandubhai Patel | 817 | 33.07 | ▲5.54 |
| Liberal Democrats | Valerie Brown | 736 | | |
| Conservative | Harihar Patel | 644 | 25.62 | ▼7.94 |
| Conservative | Pearl Mordish | 559 | | |
| Registered electors | | 5,808 | | ▲633 |
| Turnout | | 2,579 | 44.40 | ▼13.69 |
| Rejected ballots | | 14 | 0.54 | ▲0.27 |
| Labour hold | | | | |
| Labour hold | | | | |

=== Willesden Green ===
Willesden Green (2)
| Party | Candidate | Votes | % | ±% |
|---|---|---|---|---|
| Labour | Lesley Jones | 1,179 | 61.59 | ▲5.11 |
| Labour | Ahmad Shahzad | 947 | | |
| Conservative | Gabriel Reynolds | 345 | 19.03 | ▼11.78 |
| Conservative | Mohammed Chughtai | 312 | | |
| Green | Brian Orr | 136 | 7.88 | ▲1.98 |
| Liberal Democrats | Arvindbhai Patel | 134 | 6.23 | ▼0.58 |
| Socialist Alliance | Stanley Keable | 91 | 5.27 | New |
| Liberal Democrats | Farhana Salama | 81 | | |
| Registered electors | | 5,331 | | ▲632 |
| Turnout | | 1,775 | 33.30 | ▼13.71 |
| Rejected ballots | | 19 | 1.07 | ▲0.80 |
| Labour hold | | | | |
| Labour hold | | | | |
