= 1990 Brent London Borough Council election =

1990 local election in England

- 3 May 1990

All 66 seats up for election to Brent London Borough Council 34 seats needed for a majority
- Registered: 180,821
- Turnout: 77,495, 42.86%

	First party	Second party	Third party
Leader	Bob Blackman	Dorman Long	Unknown
Party	Conservative	Labour	Liberal Democrats
Leader since	1990	1987
Leader's seat	Preston	Wembley Central
Seats before	22	40 (Note: Results include those from candidates listed under the Labour Co-op designation)	4 (Note: Includes from candidates listed as belonging to the Lib Dem Focus Team)
Seats won	31	29	6
Seat change	▲9	▼11	▲2
Popular vote	68,696	60,806	21,946
Percentage	44.13%	39.06%	14.10%
- Map of the results of the 1990 Brent London Borough council election.
Council control before election
Labour
Council control after election
No Overall Control

The 1990 Brent Council election took place on 3 May 1990 to elect members of Brent London Borough Council in London, England. The whole council was up for election and the council went in no overall control.

== Election results ==
1990 Brent London Borough Council elections
Party	Seats	Gains	Losses	Net gain/loss	Seats %	Votes %	Votes	+/−
Conservative	31	9	0	▲9	46.97	44.11	68,696	
Labour	29	0	11	▼11	43.94	39.05	60,806	
Liberal Democrats	6	2	0	▲2	9.09	14.09	21,946	
Green	0	0	0	Steady	0.00	1.31	2,042	
Independent	0	0	0	Steady	0.00	0.91	1,417	
SDP	0	0	0	Steady	0.00	0.51	798	
ICP	0	0	0	Steady	0.00	0.02	21	
Total	66						155,726	

== Ward Results ==
(*) - indicates an incumbent candidate

(†) - indicates an incumbent candidate who is standing in a different ward

=== Alperton ===
Alperton (2)
Party	Candidate	Votes	%
Lib Dem Focus Team	Mike Harskin	1,619	54.52
Lib Dem Focus Team	John P. Rattray	1,505	
Labour	Ronald H. Collman	961	32.50
Labour	Syed M. Shah	901	
Conservative	Navinchandra Patel	386	12.98
Conservative	Mary S. Mitchell	358	
Registered electors		6,311	
Turnout		3067	48.60
Rejected ballots		2	0.07
Lib Dem Focus Team gain from Labour			
Lib Dem Focus Team gain from Labour			

=== Barham ===
Barham (3)
Party	Candidate	Votes	%
Lib Dem Focus Team	John C. Hammond*	2,225	58.14
Lib Dem Focus Team	Paul Lorber*	2,200	
Lib Dem Focus Team	Alan C. Johnston*	2,103	
Labour	Josephine M. Duffy	876	22.17
Labour	James Moher	844	
Labour	Jasjit K. Selhi	771	
Conservative	Uma N. Fernandes	748	19.69
Conservative	Terence C. Munro	734	
Conservative	Narinder Mudhar	730	
Registered electors		8,653	
Turnout		4069	47.02
Rejected ballots		4	0.10
Lib Dem Focus Team hold			
Lib Dem Focus Team hold			
Lib Dem Focus Team hold			

=== Barnhill ===
Barnhill (2)
Party	Candidate	Votes	%
Conservative	William A. Duffin* (Note: Duffin replaced Cllr. Helene J. Powell after her resignation in 1987)	1,799	74.82
Conservative	Irwin van Colle*	1,706	
Labour	John Duffy	420	16.30
Labour	Dennis Risby	343	
Liberal Democrats	Elizabeth Kornfield	215	8.88
Liberal Democrats	Vivienne R. Williamson	200	
Registered electors		5,138	
Turnout		2480	48.27
Rejected ballots		4	0.16
Conservative hold			
Conservative hold			

=== Brentwater ===
Brentwater (2)
Party	Candidate	Votes	%
Conservative	Michael S.M. Read	1,401	54.55
Conservative	Alan J. Wall	1,307	
Labour	Dhiraj Kataria*	1,175	45.45
Labour	Brahmdev Shukal	1,081	
Registered electors		6,469	
Turnout		2736	42.29
Rejected ballots		15	0.55
Conservative gain from Labour			
Conservative gain from Labour			

=== Brondesbury Park ===
Brondesbury Park (2)
Party	Candidate	Votes	%
Conservative	Maria J. Wheeler	960	42.38
Conservative	Albert R. Wakelin* (Note: Wakelin replaced Cllr. Malcolm I. McClelland after his resignation in 1988)	954	
Labour	Neil B. Nerva	764	33.08
Labour	Kantibhai J. Patel	729	
Lib Dem Focus Team	Anthony Skelton	553	22.63
Lib Dem Focus Team	Snehrashmi Sharma	468	
Independent	Isaac Gottlieb	43	1.91
Registered electors		5,779	
Turnout		2412	41.74
Rejected ballots		8	0.33
Conservative gain from Labour			
Conservative hold			

=== Carlton ===
Carlton (2)
Party	Candidate	Votes	%
Labour	John Lebor	1,144	68.34
Labour	Leonard R. Williams^{†}	1,121	
Conservative	Nigel G.S. Clark	333	17.97
Conservative	Stephen A.C. Huxham	263	
Green	Robert M. Jones	227	13.69
Registered electors		4,648	
Turnout		1827	39.31
Rejected ballots		3	0.16
Labour hold			
Labour hold			

=== Chamberlayne ===
Chamberlayne (2)
Party	Candidate	Votes	%
Conservative	John Warren* (Note: Warren replaced Cllr. Cedric A.StE. Best after his resignation in 1987)	1,193	46.92
Conservative	Elizabeth A. Ormiston	1,167	
Labour	Bruce A. Nichols	946	37.02
Labour	Lawrence E.A. Bardoo	916	
Green	Robert A. Davis	246	9.50
Green	Diana J. Heeks	232	
Liberal Democrats	Jack K. Papasavva	168	6.56
Liberal Democrats	Jonathan D. Pincus	162	
Registered electors		5,432	
Turnout		2674	49.23
Rejected ballots		11	0.41
Conservative hold			
Conservative gain from Labour			

=== Church End ===
Church End (2)
Party	Candidate	Votes	%
Labour	Joan B. Joseph*	867	56.43
Labour	William G. Thomas^{†} (Note: Thomas was a sitting councillor representing the Chamberlayne ward)	862	
Conservative	Daphne E. Stafford	458	28.24
Conservative	Victor G. Yarnall	408	15.33
Liberal Democrats	Chunilal K. Hirani	235	
Liberal Democrats	Navinchandra N. Joshi	235	
Registered electors		4,689	
Turnout		1666	35.53
Rejected ballots		3	0.18
Labour hold			
Labour hold			

=== Cricklewood ===
Cricklewood (2)
Party	Candidate	Votes	%
Conservative	Jack J. Sayers	1,247	50.06
Conservative	Carol A. Shaw	1,210	
Labour	John J. Ryan^{†} (Note: Ryan was a sitting councillor representing the Willesden Green ward)	1,099	43.10
Labour	Syed M. Rafiq	1,016	
Liberal Democrats	Susanna M. Heinitz	168	6.84
Liberal Democrats	William J. Joshua	168	
Registered electors		5,857	
Turnout		2627	44.85
Rejected ballots		8	0.30
Conservative gain from Labour			
Conservative gain from Labour			

=== Fryent v ===
Fryent (2)
Party	Candidate	Votes	%
Conservative	Joel D.C. Games*	1,689	59.20
Conservative	Peter A. Nelke	1,610	
Labour	Philemon A.C. Sealy	790	27.13
Labour	Manjeet S. Selhi	722	
Lib Dem Focus Team	Frederick Gordon	298	8.97
Lib Dem Focus Team	Robert Wharton	201	
SDP	Jean A. Leger	131	4.70
Registered electors		6,202	
Turnout		2902	46.79
Rejected ballots		1	0.03
Conservative hold			
Conservative hold			

=== Gladstone ===
Gladstone (2)
Party	Candidate	Votes	%
Conservative	Edward E. Lazarus*	1,378	49.45
Conservative	Francis A. Torrens	1,312	
Labour	John F. Duffy*	1,145	39.89
Labour	Ahmad Shahzad	1,024	
Green	Stella K. Collier	318	10.66
Green	George A. Meyer	262	
Registered electors		5,724	
Turnout		2869	50.12
Rejected ballots		5	0.17
Conservative gain from Labour			
Conservative hold			

=== Harlesden ===
Harlesden (2)
Party	Candidate	Votes	%
Labour	Paul A. Daisley	968	68.06
Labour	Poline Nyaga	924	
Conservative	Gary J. Pyle	327	20.07
Conservative	Mary-Ann Umeh	230	
Liberal Democrats	Ian M. Calder	170	11.87
Liberal Democrats	Sylvia A. Sewell	159	
Registered electors		4,576	
Turnout		1560	34.09
Rejected ballots		3	0.19
Labour hold			
Labour hold			

=== Kensal Rise ===
Kensal Rise (2)
Party	Candidate	Votes	%
Labour	Betty O. Igbokwe	1,105	64.28
Labour	Antonio F. Vidal	1,028	
Conservative	Colin I. Drinkwater	303	17.89
Liberal Democrats	Anne M. Harris	298	17.83
Liberal Democrats	Geoffrey D. Walley	293	
Conservative	Nicola Blackman	290	
Registered electors		4,455	
Turnout		1827	41.01
Rejected ballots		7	0.38
Labour hold			
Labour hold			

=== Kenton ===
Kenton (2)
Party	Candidate	Votes	%
Conservative	Arthur R. Steel*	2,292	73.68
Conservative	David M. Tobert* (Note: Tobert replaced Cllr. Marion Leighton after her resignation in 1988)	2,244	
Labour	Mary B. Daly	483	14.69
Labour	Elaine Smith	421	
Liberal Democrats	Jason M. Moleman	364	11.63
Liberal Democrats	Roger J. Mitchell	351	
Registered electors		6,610	
Turnout		3196	48.35
Rejected ballots		7	0.22
Conservative hold			
Conservative hold			

=== Kilburn ===
Kilburn (2)
Party	Candidate	Votes	%
Labour	Peter G. Pendsay*	1,168	56.52
Labour	Mohammad Rashid^{†} (Note: Rashid was a sitting councillor representing the Cricklewood ward)	1,026	
Conservative	Peter J. Heath	577	27.87
Conservative	Julian L. Smith	505	
Liberal Democrats	Sarah Child	318	15.61
Liberal Democrats	David J. Cocks	287	
Registered electors		5,588	
Turnout		2241	40.10
Rejected ballots		6	0.27
Labour hold			
Labour hold			

=== Kingsbury ===
Kingsbury (2)
Party	Candidate	Votes	%
Conservative	Mark V. Jones*	1,754	61.27
Conservative	Gwendolen Tookey*	1,748	
Labour	Kishore C. Dattani	843	29.21
Labour	John M. Sullivan	826	
Liberal Democrats	Valerie L. Brown	296	9.52
Liberal Democrats	Randall J. Jennings	247	
Registered electors		6,157	
Turnout		3066	49.80
Rejected ballots		9	0.29
Conservative hold			
Conservative hold			

=== Manor ===
Manor (2)
Party	Candidate	Votes	%
Labour	Columbus M. Moloney^{†} (Note: Moloney was a sitting councillor representing the St Raphael's ward)	1,116	53.10
Labour	Yusuf M. Giwa	1,024	
Conservative	Guy G. Elliston	649	30.42
Conservative	Desmond J. Spakman	576	
Green	Penelope J. Day	208	9.78
Green	Philip P. Dymond	186	
Liberal Democrats	Donald N. MacArthur	156	6.70
Liberal Democrats	Brenda M. Shuttleworth	114	
Registered electors		5,185	
Turnout		2162	41.70
Rejected ballots		4	0.19
Labour hold			
Labour hold			

=== Mapesbury ===
Mapesbury (2)
Party	Candidate	Votes	%
Conservative	Peter J.C. Czarniecki	931	46.65
Conservative	Richard W. Buckley	924	
Labour	Frank Carvalho	833	41.23
Labour	Nicholas L. Russell	806	
Liberal Democrats	Therese F. Kilcoyne	248	12.12
Liberal Democrats	David M. Lewin	233	
Registered electors		4,998	
Turnout		2118	42.38
Rejected ballots		10	0.47
Conservative gain from Labour			
Conservative gain from Labour			

=== Preston ===
Preston (3)
Party	Candidate	Votes	%
Conservative	Robert J. Blackman* (Note: Blackman replaced Cllr. Eric Newton after his death in 1986)	2,740	69.82
Conservative	Thomas P. Taylor*	2,614	
Conservative	Alan J. Kemp*	2,600	
Labour	Benjamin Rickman	761	19.59
Labour	Ruby S. Nerva	748	
Labour	Abbas Ally	723	
Liberal Democrats	Valerie D. Goldberg	412	10.59
Liberal Democrats	Angiola Coath	392	
Registered electors		9,187	
Turnout		3968	43.19
Rejected ballots		9	0.23
Conservative hold			
Conservative hold			
Conservative hold			

=== Queen's Park ===
Queen's Park (2)
Party	Candidate	Votes	%
Liberal Democrats	Mark Cummins* (Note: Cummins replaced Cllr. Merle J. Amory after their resignation in 1988)	683	32.71
Labour	Jean M. Spray*	661	35.01
Labour	Michael J. Heiser	647	
Liberal Democrats	Noel Martin	539	
Conservative	Andrew S. Beckman	427	22.54
Conservative	John E. Robinson	414	
Green	David Bradney	185	9.74
Green	Helena B.Z. Nicholls	178	
Registered electors		3,999	
Turnout		1984	49.61
Rejected ballots		6	0.30
Liberal Democrats hold			
Labour hold			

=== Queensbury ===
Queensbury (2)
Party	Candidate	Votes	%
Conservative	Eric G. McDonald*	1,552	61.55
Conservative	Roger D. Stone*	1,544	
Labour	Martin M. Donaghue	761	29.15
Labour	Gary Bancroft	705	
SDP	John L. Adamson	247	9.30
SDP	Mark V. Schuck	220	
Registered electors		6,363	
Turnout		2724	42.81
Rejected ballots		3	0.11
Conservative hold			
Conservative hold			

=== Roe Green ===
Roe Green (2)
Party	Candidate	Votes	%
Conservative	Peter S. Golds	1,425	57.68
Conservative	Chunilal V. Chavda* (Note: Chavda replaced Cllr. Samuel A. Greenaway after his resignation in 1987)	1,390	
Labour	Ramesh Patel	913	34.00
Labour	Ghulam Shabbir-Qureshi	747	
Liberal Democrats	Edith A. Valladares	220	8.32
Liberal Democrats	Mark J. Valledares	185	
Registered electors		5,546	
Turnout		2608	47.02
Rejected ballots		4	0.15
Conservative hold			
Conservative hold			

=== Roundwood ===
Roundwood (2)
Party	Candidate	Votes	%
Labour	Joyce Bacchus	1,182	71.86
Labour	Richard E. Hume	1,080	
Conservative	Richard E. Clark	334	19.82
Conservative	Jean Hamer	290	
Liberal Democrats	Simon K. Clarke	161	8.32
Liberal Democrats	Eric Shuttleworth	101	
Registered electors		4,823	
Turnout		1766	36.62
Rejected ballots		6	0.34
Labour hold			
Labour hold			

=== St Andrews ===
St Andrews (2)
Party	Candidate	Votes	%
Labour	Valerie Harris	995	50.02
Labour	Richard Harrod*	938	
Conservative	Barry N. Cameron	858	42.32
Conservative	Martin W. Doe	777	
Liberal Democrats	Benjamin I. Brown	157	7.66
Liberal Democrats	Patrick J. Elliott	139	
Registered electors		5,258	
Turnout		2072	39.41
Rejected ballots		8	0.39
Labour hold			
Labour hold			

=== St Raphael's ===
St Raphael's (3)
Party	Candidate	Votes	%
Labour	Harshad M. Barot	1,273	61.70
Labour	Ann M. John	1,242	
Labour	Nkechi B. Amalu-Johnson	1,227	
Conservative	Richard Marlow	658	28.35
Conservative	Dennis Okocha	575	
Conservative	Rahul N. Patel	485	
Liberal Democrats	Arbindbhai V. Patel	226	9.95
Liberal Democrats	Joseph Fahey	224	
Liberal Democrats	Olive M. Tucker	152	
Registered electors		7,478	
Turnout		2345	31.36
Rejected ballots		13	0.55
Labour hold			
Labour hold			
Labour hold			

=== Stonebridge ===
Stonebridge (2)
Party	Candidate	Votes	%
Labour	Harriet J. Harper	925	66.13
Labour	Manibhai D. Patel*	792	
Conservative	John R. Morgan	313	23.94
Conservative	David H. Wren	309	
Liberal Democrats	Caroline Hennessy	116	8.31
Liberal Democrats	Helen Begbie	100	
ICP	David A. O'Sullivan	21	1.62
Registered electors		4,673	
Turnout		1402	30.00
Rejected ballots		8	0.57
Labour hold			
Labour hold			

=== Sudbury ===
Sudbury (2)
Party	Candidate	Votes	%
Conservative	Cormach J. Moore	1,618	67.55
Conservative	Leslie Winters*	1,583	
Labour	David A. Davies	546	20.47
Labour	Sukai Sallah	423	
Liberal Democrats	Susan Lorber	316	11.98
Liberal Democrats	Kanchan Shah	251	
Registered electors		6,021	
Turnout		2541	42.20
Rejected ballots		7	0.28
Conservative hold			
Conservative hold			

=== Sudbury Court ===
Sudbury Court (2)
Party	Candidate	Votes	%
Conservative	Gerhard G.A. Fiegel*	1,352	70.00
Conservative	Vanessa J. Addinall	1,307	
Labour	George E. Crane	433	21.95
Labour	Ronald J. Lawton	400	
Liberal Democrats	David Capron	158	8.05
Liberal Democrats	Hilda Glazer	147	
Registered electors		5,182	
Turnout		1994	38.48
Rejected ballots		3	0.15
Conservative hold			
Conservative hold			

=== Tokyngton ===
Tokyngton (3)
Party	Candidate	Votes	%
Labour	Kantilal Patel	1,840	49.47
Labour	Latikaben L. Patel*	1,830	
Labour	Cyril Shaw^{†} (Note: Shaw was a sitting councillor representing the Brondesbury Park ward)	1,767	
Conservative	Reginald R. Colwill	1,614	43.79
Conservative	Gulab Mistry	1,604	
Conservative	Renee Pope	1,595	
Liberal Democrats	Daniel E. Brown	278	6.74
Liberal Democrats	David A. Davies	265	
Liberal Democrats	Anil Sengupta	197	
Registered electors		8,474	
Turnout		3949	46.60
Rejected ballots		9	0.23
Labour hold			
Labour hold			
Labour hold			

=== Wembley Central ===
Wembley Central (2)
Party	Candidate	Votes	%
Labour	Sebastian D. Long^{†} (Note: Long was a sitting councillor representing the Roundwood ward)	1,151	48.90
Labour Co-op	Margarette S.P. Quirke	899	
Conservative	Daksha Bhatt	700	32.83
Conservative	Dineshkumar N. Mistry	676	
Liberal Democrats	Susan M. Hammond	302	13.50
Liberal Democrats	Chandubhai J. Patel	264	
SDP	Charmion C.B. Lewis	104	4.77
SDP	Christopher J. Nield	96	
Registered electors		5,835	
Turnout		2340	40.10
Rejected ballots		7	0.30
Labour hold			
Labour Co-op hold			

=== Willesden Green ===
Willesden Green (2)
Party	Candidate	Votes	%
Labour	Hazel A.D. Baird^{†} (Note: Baird was a sitting councillor representing the Mapesbury ward)	1,142	52.36
Labour	Arberkhan M. Sarguroh	1,074	
Independent	Sally P. Hunt	729	32.47
Independent	Meryl A. Skyrme	645	
Conservative	John F. Greenwood	362	15.17
Conservative	Eric Soloff	279	
Registered electors		5,511	
Turnout		2303	41.79
Rejected ballots		13	0.56
Labour hold			
Labour hold			
