= Cricklewood and Mapesbury =

Electoral ward in Brent, London, England

- Electoral ward for the Brent London Borough Council
- Borough: Brent
- County: Greater London
- Population: 14,149 (2021)
- Major settlements: Cricklewood, Mapesbury
- Area: 1.267 km²

Current electoral ward
- Created: 2022
- Councillors: 2

Cricklewood and Mapesbury is an electoral ward in the London Borough of Brent. The ward was first used in the 2022 elections. It elects two councillors to Brent London Borough Council.

== Geography ==
The ward is named after the suburbs of Cricklewood and Mapesbury.

== Councillors ==
Election	Councillors	
2022	Tariq Dar (Labour)	Gwen Grahl (Labour)

== Elections ==
=== 2022 Brent London Borough Council election ===
Cricklewood and Mapesbury (2 seats)
Party	Candidate	Votes	%	±%
Labour	Tariq Dar*	1,669	59.0	
Labour	Gwen Grahl*	1,470	51.9	
Green	John Kohut	437	15.4	
Conservative	Freddie Fulton	431	15.2	
Conservative	Richard Geldart	405	14.3	
Liberal Democrats	Alyssa Gilbert	377	13.3	
Liberal Democrats	Anthony Dunn	337	11.9	
Independent	Scott Bartle	188	6.6	
Turnout		2,831	30.3	N/A
Registered electors		9,269		
Labour win (new seat)				
Labour win (new seat)				
