= Harlesden and Kensal Green =

Electoral ward in Brent, London, England

- Electoral ward for the Brent London Borough Council
- Borough: Brent
- County: Greater London
- Population: 20,076 (2021)
- Major settlements: Harlesden and Kensal Green
- Area: 1.563 km²

Current electoral ward
- Created: 2022
- Councillors: 3

Harlesden and Kensal Green is an electoral ward in the London Borough of Brent. The ward was first used in the 2022 elections. It elects three councillors to Brent London Borough Council.

== Geography ==
The ward is named after the suburbs of Harlesden and Kensal Green.

== Councillors ==
Election	Councillors		
2022	Jumbo Chan (Labour)	Matt Kelcher (Labour)	Mili Patel (Labour)

== Elections ==
=== 2022 Brent London Borough Council election ===
Harlesden and Kensal Green (3 seats)
Party	Candidate	Votes	%	±%
Labour	Jumbo Chan*	2,356	67.4	
Labour	Matt Kelcher*	2,174	62.2	
Labour	Mili Patel*	2,115	60.4	
Green	Eugenia Barnett	707	20.2	
Conservative	Bhavna Patel	396	11.3	
Conservative	Kieron Walker	374	10.7	
Conservative	Aloka Roy	350	10.0	
Liberal Democrats	Alex Guest	339	9.7	
Liberal Democrats	Tilly McAuliffe	336	9.6	
Liberal Democrats	Deborah Sutherland	332	9.5	
Independent	Wasim Badru	294	8.4	
Turnout		3,496	25.4	N/A
Registered electors		13,663		
Labour win (new seat)				
Labour win (new seat)				
Labour win (new seat)				
