= 2022 Brent London Borough Council election =

2022 local election in Brent

2022 Brent Council election
- 5 May 2022

All 57 council seats
	First party	Second party	Third party
Party	Labour	Conservative	Liberal Democrats
Last election	60 seats, 57.6%	3 seats, 22.5%	0 seats, 12.6%
Seats won	49	5	3
Seat change	▼11	▲2	▲3
- Results of the 2022 Brent London Borough council election. Conservatives in blue, Labour in red and Liberal Democrats in yellow.
council control before election
Labour
Subsequent council control
Labour

The 2022 Brent London Borough Council election took place on 5 May 2022. All 57 members of Brent London Borough Council were to be elected. The elections took place alongside local elections in the other London boroughs and elections to local authorities across the United Kingdom.

In the previous election in 2018, the Labour Party maintained its control of the council, winning 60 out of the 63 seats with the Conservative Party forming the council opposition with the remaining three seats. The 2022 election took place under new election boundaries, which reduced the number of councillors to 57.

== Background ==
=== History ===
Result of the 2018 borough election

The thirty-two London boroughs were established in 1965 by the London Government Act 1963. They are the principal authorities in Greater London and have responsibilities including education, housing, planning, highways, social services, libraries, recreation, waste, environmental health and revenue collection. Some of the powers are shared with the Greater London Authority, which also manages passenger transport, police and fire.

Since its formation, Brent has been variously under Labour control, no overall control and Conservative control. Only Labour, Conservative and Liberal Democrat councillors have been elected to the council. The council has had an overall Labour majority since the 2010 election, in which Labour won 40 seats, the Liberal Democrats won 17 and the Conservatives won six. The Liberal Democrats lost all but one of their seats in the 2014 election before losing their final seat in the most recent election in 2018. The 2018 result saw Labour win 60 seats with 57.6% of the overall vote, and the Conservatives win three with 22.5% of the overall vote. The Liberal Democrats received 12.6% of votes across the borough and the Green Party received 5.6% of the vote, but neither won any seats. The incumbent leader of the council is Muhammed Butt, who has held that position since 2014.

=== Council term ===
Michael Pavey, a Labour councillor for Barnhill ward, resigned in November 2019, citing family reasons. In May 2016, while serving as deputy leader of the council, he had unsuccessfully challenged Butt for the leadership of the council. Later in 2016 he resigned from the council's cabinet because he disagreed with Butt about how to implement cuts. Another Labour councillor for the same ward, Sarah Marquis, resigned days later, citing family and personal reasons. A Labour councillor for Wembley Central ward, Luke Patterson, resigned in the same month citing personal reasons. By-elections to replace all three, in addition to James Allie, a Labour councillor for Alperton who resigned, were held on 23 January 2020. Allie was reportedly suspended from the party. The Labour candidate to replace Allie, Chetan Harpale, was suspended from his party during the campaign to investigate alleged Islamophobia. Harpale lost the election, with the Liberal Democrat candidate Anton Georgiou being elected. The other three by-elections were all held by Labour on reduced majorities.

In 2021, a Labour councillor for Brondesbury Park, Kieron Gill, resigned, declining to explain his reasons. Earlier in 2021 he had been the only Labour councillor to abstain on the council budget. The by-election was held on 6 May 2021, on the same date as the 2021 London mayoral and London Assembly elections. The Labour candidate, Gwen Grahl, was elected. Earlier that week, the Labour candidate Abdirazak Abdi resigned from the Labour group to sit as an independent councillor.

Along with most other London boroughs, Brent was subject to a boundary review ahead of the 2022 election. The Local Government Boundary Commission for England concluded that the council should have 57 seats, a reduction of six, and produced new election boundaries following a period of consultation. The new boundaries comprise thirteen three-councillor wards and nine two-councillor wards.

== Electoral process ==
Brent, like other London borough councils, elects all of its councillors at once every four years. The previous election took place in 2018. The election took place by multi-member first-past-the-post voting, with each ward being represented by two or three councillors. Electors had as many votes as there are councillors to be elected in their ward, with the top two or three being elected.

All registered electors (British, Irish, Commonwealth and European Union citizens) living in London aged 18 or over were entitled to vote in the election. People who lived at two addresses in different councils, such as university students with different term-time and holiday addresses, were entitled to be registered for and vote in elections in both local authorities. Voting in-person at polling stations took place from 7:00 to 22:00 on election day, and voters were able to apply for postal votes or proxy votes in advance of the election.

== Previous council composition ==
Council composition ahead of the 2022 election

After 2018 election		Before 2022 election		After 2022 election	
Party	Seats	Party	Seats	Party	Seats
Labour	60	Labour	59	Labour	49
Conservative	3	Conservative	3	Conservative	5
		Liberal Democrats	1	Liberal Democrats	3

== Results summary ==
2022 Brent London Borough Council election
Party	Seats	Gains	Losses	Net gain/loss	Seats %	Votes %	Votes	+/−
Labour	49	0	5	▼10	86.0	57.9	103,176	+0.3
Conservative	5	2	0	▲2	8.8	24.3	43,390	+1.8
Liberal Democrats	3	2	0	▲2	5.3	13.6	24,213	+1.0
Green	0	0	0	0	0.0	3.7	6,591	-1.9
Independent	0	0	0	0	0.0	0.5	925	±0.0

== Ward results ==
Statements of persons nominated were published on 6 April. Sitting councillors are marked with an asterisk (*) although as ward boundaries have changed significantly, they cannot strictly be called "incumbent" as existing council wards would cease to exist upon the election of the new Council.

=== Alperton ===
Alperton (3 seats)
Party	Candidate	Votes	%	±%
Liberal Democrats	Anton Georgiou*	2,108	50.3	+39.8
Labour Co-op	Bhagwanji Chohan*	1,871	43.0	−14.3
Liberal Democrats	Hannah Matin	1,703	39.1	+30.1
Labour Co-op	Trupti Sangani*	1,688	38.8	−14.5
Liberal Democrats	Sandria Terrelonge	1,631	37.5	+31.0
Labour Co-op	Mustapha Ishola-Jimoh	1,566	36.0	−21.2
Conservative	Yash Patel	553	12.7	−11.4
Conservative	Ravindrashinh Dashandi	532	12.2	−8.7
Conservative	Urmil Soni	450	10.3	−8.2
Turnout		4,352	43.4	−3.4
Registered electors		9,988		
Liberal Democrats gain from Labour		Swing	+27.15	
Labour hold		Swing	-22.65	
Liberal Democrats gain from Labour		Swing	+25.6	

=== Barnhill ===
Barnhill (2 seats)
Party	Candidate	Votes	%	±%
Labour	Kathleen Fraser	1,410	60.0	−1.3
Labour	Robert Johnson*	1,270	54.0	−7.2
Conservative	Pranav Patel	732	31.1	+7.0
Conservative	Sai Madabhushi	705	30.0	+5.9
Green	Richard Porter	282	3.8	New
Turnout		2,350	29.2	−5.0
Registered electors		7,993		
Labour hold		Swing	-4.15	
Labour hold		Swing	-6.55	

=== Brondesbury Park ===
Brondesbury Park (2 seats)
Party	Candidate	Votes	%	±%
Labour	Erica Gbajumo*	1,658	55.1	+9.7
Labour	Ryan Hack	1,464	48.7	+4.0
Conservative	Sapna Chadha	790	26.3	−16.5
Conservative	Bertha Joseph	713	23.7	−12.5
Green	Natasha Woodward	481	16.0	New
Liberal Democrats	Mark Cummins	305	7.6	−4.4
Liberal Democrats	Jonny Singh	238	7.9	−3.6
Turnout		3,008	31.2	−9.7
Registered electors		9,556		
Labour hold		Swing	+13.1	
Labour hold		Swing	+8.25	

=== Cricklewood and Mapesbury ===
Cricklewood and Mapesbury (2 seats)
Party	Candidate	Votes	%	±%
Labour	Tariq Dar*	1,669	59.0	
Labour	Gwen Grahl*	1,470	51.9	
Green	John Kohut	437	15.4	
Conservative	Freddie Fulton	431	15.2	
Conservative	Richard Geldart	405	14.3	
Liberal Democrats	Alyssa Gilbert	377	13.3	
Liberal Democrats	Anthony Dunn	337	11.9	
Independent	Scott Bartle	188	6.6	
Turnout		2,831	30.3	N/A
Registered electors		9,269		
Labour win (new seat)				
Labour win (new seat)				

=== Dollis Hill ===
Dollis Hill (3 seats)
Party	Candidate	Votes	%	±%
Labour	Parvez Ahmed*	2,310	58.9	
Labour	Liz Dixon*	2,307	58.9	
Labour	Arshad Mahmood*	2,183	55.7	
Liberal Democrats	Alison Hopkins	842	21.5	
Conservative	Richard Lacey	614	15.7	
Conservative	Anisha Patel	599	15.3	
Conservative	Anand Roy	541	13.8	
Liberal Democrats	Daniel Brown	471	12.0	
Green	Peter Murry	437	11.1	
Liberal Democrats	Vivienna Williamson	410	10.5	
Turnout		3,920	27.8	−15.3
Registered electors		14,034		
Labour hold		Swing		
Labour hold		Swing		
Labour hold		Swing		

=== Harlesden and Kensal Green ===
Harlesden and Kensal Green (3 seats)
Party	Candidate	Votes	%	±%
Labour	Jumbo Chan*	2,356	67.4	
Labour	Matt Kelcher*	2,174	62.2	
Labour	Mili Patel*	2,115	60.4	
Green	Eugenia Barnett	707	20.2	
Conservative	Bhavna Patel	396	11.3	
Conservative	Kieron Walker	374	10.7	
Conservative	Aloka Roy	350	10.0	
Liberal Democrats	Alex Guest	339	9.7	
Liberal Democrats	Tilly McAuliffe	336	9.6	
Liberal Democrats	Deborah Sutherland	332	9.5	
Independent	Wasim Badru	294	8.4	
Turnout		3,496	25.4	N/A
Registered electors		13,663		
Labour win (new seat)				
Labour win (new seat)				
Labour win (new seat)				

=== Kenton ===
Kenton (3 seats)
Party	Candidate	Votes	%	±%
Conservative	Sunita Hirani	2,287	50.5	−0.5
Conservative	Suresh Kansagra*	2,165	47.8	−0.8
Conservative	Michael Maurice*	2,047	45.2	−0.8
Labour	Mansoor Akram*	1,718	38.0	−1.4
Labour	Fiona Mulaisho	1,662	36.7	+0.3
Labour	Jahan Mahmoodi	1,565	34.6	+0.9
Liberal Democrats	Charlie Clinton	397	8.8	−0.6
Green	Baston De'Medici-Jaguar	384	8.5	+1.6
Liberal Democrats	Yulian Dimitrov	250	5.5	−0.3
Liberal Democrats	Ulla Thiessen	250	5.5	+1.4
Turnout		4,525	35.3	−4.5
Registered electors		12,774		
Conservative hold		Swing	+0.95	
Conservative hold		Swing	-0.55	
Conservative hold		Swing	-0.85	

=== Kilburn ===
Kilburn (3 seats)
Party	Candidate	Votes	%	±%
Labour	Rita Begum	2,115	68.1	+7.0
Labour	Rita Conneely*	2,108	67.9	+2.2
Labour	Anthony Molloy	1,861	60.0	0.00
Green	Nathaniel Williams	679	21.9	New
Liberal Democrats	Anne Sharp	395	12.7	−3.2
Conservative	Katie Doyle	364	11.7	−2.0
Liberal Democrats	Charles Brand	345	11.1	−4.3
Conservative	Mark Roberts	328	10.6	−2.7
Liberal Democrats	Derick Rethans	321	10.3	−1.2
Conservative	Retno Widuri	305	9.8	−2.8
Independent	Sabrina Bell	123	4.0	New
Turnout		3,105	25.2	−8.3
Registered electors		12,248		
Labour hold		Swing	+5.1	
Labour hold		Swing	+2.1	
Labour hold		Swing	+2.1	

=== Kingsbury ===
Kingsbury (2 seats)
Party	Candidate	Votes	%	±%
Labour	Saqib Butt*	1,328	53.3	
Labour	Shama Tatler*	1,312	52.7	
Conservative	Sanjana Karnani	782	31.4	
Conservative	Salman Khan	649	26.1	
Green	Maurice Gold	241	9.7	
Liberal Democrats	Michael Brooke	235	9.4	
Liberal Democrats	Larry Ngan	136	5.5	
Turnout		2,491	31.3	N/A
Registered electors		7,921		
Labour win (new seat)				
Labour win (new seat)				

=== Northwick Park ===
Northwick Park (2 seats)
Party	Candidate	Votes	%	±%
Labour	Narinder Singh Bajwa	1,638	55.8	
Labour	Diana Collymore	1,543	52.6	
Conservative	Harmit Vyas	984	33.5	
Conservative	Mabel Balogun	963	32.8	
Liberal Democrats	Peter Corcoran	254	8.7	
Liberal Democrats	Alessandra Grasso	250	8.5	
Turnout		2,934	33.4	−3.1
Registered electors		8,763		
Labour hold		Swing		
Labour hold		Swing		

=== Preston ===
Preston (2 seats)
Party	Candidate	Votes	%	±%
Labour	Daniel Kennelly*	1,532	55.2	
Labour	Orleen Hylton*	1,417	51.1	
Conservative	Hema Mistry	941	33.9	
Conservative	Sushil Rapatwar	808	29.1	
Green	David Pearson	191	6.9	
Liberal Democrats	Dominic O'Sullivan	143	5.2	
Liberal Democrats	Robert Goodsell	128	4.6	
Independent	Cristian Stincanu	111	4.0	
Turnout		2,775	34.9	−3.0
Registered electors		7,929		
Labour hold		Swing		
Labour hold		Swing		

=== Queens Park ===
Queens Park (3 seats)
Party	Candidate	Votes	%	±%
Labour Co-op	Stephen Crabb	2,382	59.9	+20.6
Labour Co-op	Neil Nerva*	2,380	59.8	+19.9
Labour Co-op	Eleanor Southwood*	2,347	59.0	+21.2
Green	Sheila Simpson	832	20.9	+10.00
Liberal Democrats	Virginia Brand	737	18.5	−2.00
Liberal Democrats	Deborah Unger	647	16.3	0.00
Liberal Democrats	Robin Sharp	545	13.7	−2.70
Conservative	Monica Roberts	511	12.8	−2.20
Conservative	Salman Anwar	504	12.7	0.00
Conservative	Harry Gillow	487	12.2	+1.10
Turnout		3,979	31.4	−7.9
Registered electors		12,620		
Labour hold		Swing	+15.75	
Labour hold		Swing	+15.40	
Labour hold		Swing	+16.05	

=== Queensbury ===
Queensbury (3 seats)
Party	Candidate	Votes	%	±%
Conservative	Kanta Mistry	1,972	47.6	+0.7
Conservative	Jayanti Patel	1,886	45.5	+0.4
Labour	Sandra Kabir*	1,797	43.3	−9.6
Conservative	Manoj Mishra	1,782	43.0	+5.3
Labour	Anita Thakkar*	1,761	42.5	−12.0
Labour	Kana Naheerathan*	1,662	40.1	−11.7
Liberal Democrats	Valerie Brown	330	8.0	0.0
Liberal Democrats	Jeanie Cruickshank	255	6.2	−2.6
Liberal Democrats	Ieva Tomsone	212	5.1	−2.0
Independent	Brian Yauner	117	2.8	New
Turnout		4,146	34.2	−5.6
Registered electors		12,069		
Conservative gain from Labour		Swing	+6.35	
Conservative gain from Labour		Swing	+6.05	
Labour hold		Swing	-7.45	

=== Roundwood ===
Roundwood (3 seats)
Party	Candidate	Votes	%	±%
Labour	Elliot Chappell*	2,060	75.6	
Labour	Fleur Donnelly-Jackson*	2,034	74.6	
Labour	Jake Rubin	1,873	68.7	
Green	Marion Dunmore	466	17.1	
Conservative	Elizabeth Inglis	400	14.7	
Conservative	George Appiah-Fordjour	396	14.5	
Conservative	Gerald Soames	319	11.7	
Turnout		2,726	25.1	N/A
Registered electors		10,791		
Labour win (new seat)				
Labour win (new seat)				
Labour win (new seat)				

=== Stonebridge ===
Stonebridge (3 seats)
Party	Candidate	Votes	%	±%
Labour	Abdi Aden*	2,266	74.4	
Labour	Promise Knight*	2,060	67.6	
Labour	Tony Ethapemi*	2,028	66.6	
Green	Simon Erskine	469	15.4	
Conservative	Said Deria	463	15.2	
Conservative	Harry Quainoo	421	13.8	
Conservative	Ajoy Roy	406	13.3	
Turnout		3,046	22.3	−8.7
Registered electors		13,593		
Labour hold		Swing		
Labour hold		Swing		
Labour hold		Swing		

=== Sudbury ===
Sudbury (2 seats)
Party	Candidate	Votes	%	±%
Liberal Democrats	Paul Lorber	1,514	44.2	+5.7
Labour	Teo Benea	1,492	43.5	−5.9
Labour	Thomas Stephens*	1,424	41.6	−1.6
Liberal Democrats	Kalpana Rawal	1,320	38.5	+5.8
Conservative	Pinakin Raval	409	11.9	−0.8
Conservative	Chintan Zaveri	318	9.3	−1.4
Turnout		3,426	36.8	−7.3
Registered electors		9,240		
Liberal Democrats gain from Labour		Swing	+3.65	
Labour hold		Swing	-5.85	

=== Tokyngton ===
Tokyngton (2 seats)
Party	Candidate	Votes	%	±%
Labour	Muhammed Butt*	1,447	58.2	−5.3
Labour	Krupa Sheth*	1,408	56.7	−5.7
Conservative	Krunal Patel	649	26.1	+3.8
Conservative	Shamim Chowdhury	537	21.6	+0.2
Green	Martin Francis	306	12.3	+1.5
Liberal Democrats	Ian McAullife	160	6.4	−3.6
Liberal Democrats	Mohammed Khalid	138	5.6	−1.8
Turnout		2,485	34.0	+4.1
Registered electors		7,270		
Labour hold		Swing	-4.55	
Labour hold		Swing	-2.95	

=== Welsh Harp ===
Welsh Harp (3 seats)
Party	Candidate	Votes	%	±%
Labour	Mary Mitchell	1,849	54.8	−5.3
Labour	Amer Agha*	1,774	52.6	−8.6
Labour	Harbi Farah*	1,700	50.4	−7.4
Conservative	Kieran McCartney-Patel	933	27.7	+4.8
Conservative	Andy Sharma	870	25.8	+3.5
Conservative	Ibrahim Bahadur	782	23.2	+3.0
Green	David Stevens	405	12.0	New
Liberal Democrats	Diana Ayres	383	11.4	+2.6
Liberal Democrats	Freda Raingold	350	10.4	+3.8
Liberal Democrats	Richard Sisson	261	7.7	+2.0
Independent	Elcena Jeffers	92	2.7	New
Turnout		3,373	27.0	−6.7
Registered electors		12,417		
Labour hold		Swing	-5.05	
Labour hold		Swing	-6.05	
Labour hold		Swing	-5.20	

=== Wembley Central ===
Wembley Central (3 seats)
Party	Candidate	Votes	%	±%
Labour	Sonia Shah*	2,658	57.4	−7.5
Labour	Rajan Seelan	2,560	55.3	−9.1
Labour	Ketan Sheth*	2,388	51.6	−9.0
Conservative	Mahendra Singh Negi	1,079	23.3	7.8
Conservative	Wilhelmina Murray*	1,040	22.5	7.2
Liberal Democrats	David Johnson	896	19.4	8.5
Conservative	Riyaz Shaik	753	16.3	1.5
Liberal Democrats	Afifa Majid	658	14.2	5.4
Liberal Democrats	Robert Wharton	585	12.6	6.8
Turnout		4,627	36.8	−5.7
Registered electors		12,486		
Labour hold		Swing	-7.8	
Labour hold		Swing	-8.15	
Labour hold		Swing	-8.75	

=== Wembley Hill ===
Wembley Hill (3 seats)
Party	Candidate	Votes	%	±%
Labour	Ihtesham Afzal*	1,526	46.2	
Labour	Akram Ajmal	1,510	45.7	
Labour	Ishma Moeen	1,390	42.1	
Conservative	Floyd Do Rosario	1,299	39.3	
Conservative	Reena De Cruz	1,289	39.0	
Conservative	Sushil Dokwal	1,116	33.8	
Liberal Democrats	Eileen Barker	288	8.7	
Green	Jordan Harris	274	8.3	
Liberal Democrats	Douglas Lee	250	7.6	
Liberal Democrats	Gylnis Lee	206	6.2	
Turnout		3,302	30.1	N/A
Registered electors		10,909		
Labour win (new seat)				
Labour win (new seat)				
Labour win (new seat)				

=== Wembley Park ===
Wembley Park (2 seats)
Party	Candidate	Votes	%	±%
Labour	Tazi Smith	607	60.6	
Labour	Iman Moghaddam	592	59.1	
Conservative	Christopher Phillips	189	18.9	
Conservative	Sellathurai Jeyakumar	185	18.5	
Liberal Democrats	Tim Jarman	174	17.4	
Liberal Democrats	Edan Powell	150	15.0	
Turnout		1,002	21.0	N/A
Registered electors		4,753		
Labour win (new seat)				
Labour win (new seat)				

=== Willesden Green ===
Willesden Green (3 seats)
Party	Candidate	Votes	%	±%
Labour	Janice Long*	2,455	61.8	−5.8
Labour	Saqlain Choudry	2,322	58.5	−8.9
Labour	Tom Miller*	2,114	53.2	−11.8
Green	William Relton	838	21.1	9.5
Liberal Democrats	Philip Alexander	607	15.3	5.1
Conservative	Raffles Fulton	554	14.0	2.8
Conservative	Hannah Phillips	546	13.7	4.2
Liberal Democrats	Isabella Thomas	534	13.4	5.8
Conservative	Barkha Sharma	487	12.3	3.5
Liberal Democrats	Max Fuller	480	12.1	4.7
Turnout		3,971	30.9	+5.4
Registered electors		12,784		
Labour hold		Swing	-7.65	
Labour hold		Swing	-7.00	
Labour hold		Swing	-7.30	

== Changes 2022-2026 ==
=== Affiliation changes ===
5 Labour MPs defected to the Green Party: Harbi Farah and Mary Mitchell, who represent Welsh Harp, Iman Ahmadi Moghaddam, who represents Wembley Park, Tony Ethapemi, who represents Stonebridge and Erica Gbajumo, who represents Brondesbury Park.

=== By-elections ===
==== Alperton ====
Alperton by-election: 18 February 2025
Party	Candidate	Votes	%	±%
Liberal Democrats	Charlie Clinton	1,743	48.5	
Labour	Prerna Thakkar	827	23.0	
Conservative	Harmit Vyas	740	20.6	
Reform	Mahendra Negi	286	8.0	
Majority		916	25.5	N/A
Turnout		3,596	33.7	−9.7
Registered electors		10,741		
Liberal Democrats hold		Swing		

The by-election was triggered following the resignation of Cllr Anton Georgiou.

==== Queen's Park ====
Queen's Park by-election: 4 July 2024
Party	Candidate	Votes	%	±%
Labour	Lesley Smith	3,038	43.6	–9.8
Liberal Democrats	Virginia Bonham Carter	1,462	21.0	+4.5
Green	Ricardo Davies	1,329	19.1	+0.5
Conservative	Emily Sheffield	1,138	16.3	+4.8
Majority		1,576	22.6	N/A
Turnout		7,035	54.4	+23.0
Registered electors		12,929		
Labour hold		Swing	▼7.2	

The by-election was triggered following the resignation of Cllr Eleanor Southwood.
