= Wembley Park (ward) =

Electoral ward in Brent, London, England

- Electoral ward for the Brent London Borough Council
- Wembley Park ward boundaries since 2022
- Borough: Brent
- County: Greater London
- Population: 7,548 (2021) (Note: 2021 Census data reported for 2022 ward boundaries)
- Electorate: 4,753 (2022)
- Major settlements: Wembley Park
- Area: 0.7748 square kilometres (0.2992 sq mi)

Current electoral ward
- Created: 2022
- Number of members: 2
- Councillors: Iman Ahmadi Moghaddam; Najib Warsame
- GSS code: E05013516

Wembley Park is an electoral ward in the London Borough of Brent. The ward was originally created in 1968 and abolished in 1978. It was created again in 2022 and used from the 2022 elections. It returns two councillors to Brent London Borough Council.

== List of councillors ==
Seat	Councillor	Took office	Left office	Party	Election
1	Thomas Gornall	9 May 1968	27 June 1968	Conservative	May 1968
2	A. Sharpe	27 June 1968	27 June 1968	Conservative	May 1968
1	I. Scott	27 June 1968	2 May 1974	Conservative	June 1968, 1971
2	P. Bance	27 June 1968	2 May 1974	Conservative	June 1968, 1971
1	Thomas Gornall	2 May 1974	4 May 1978	Conservative	1974
2	A. Sharpe	2 May 1974	1976	Conservative	1974
2	John Detre	21 October 1976	4 May 1978	Conservative	1976
1	Tazi Smith	2022	2026	Labour	2022
1	Iman Ahmadi Moghaddam (Note: Iman Ahmadi Moghaddam changed parties in 2025.)	2022	Incumbent	Labour	2022, 2026
1	Iman Ahmadi Moghaddam	2022	Incumbent	Green	2022, 2026
2	Najib Warsame	2026	Incumbent	Green	2026

== Brent council elections since 2022 ==
There was a revision of ward boundaries in Brent in 2022 and the Wembley Park ward was recreated.

=== 2022 election ===
The election took place on 5 May 2022.

2022 Brent London Borough Council election: Wembley Park
Party	Candidate	Votes	%	±%
Labour	Tazi Smith	607	60.6	
Labour	Iman Ahmadi Moghaddam	592	59.1	
Conservative	Christopher Phillips	189	18.9	
Conservative	Sellathurai Jeyakumar	185	18.5	
Liberal Democrats	Tim Jarman	174	17.4	
Liberal Democrats	Edan Powell	150	15.0	
Turnout		1,002	21.0	N/A
Registered electors		4,753		
Labour win (new seat)				
Labour win (new seat)				

== 1968–1978 Brent council elections ==
=== 1976 by-election ===
The by-election took place on 21 October 1976.

1976 Wembley Park by-election
Party	Candidate	Votes	%	±%
Conservative	John Detre	1,816		
Labour	Maurice Hoffman	466		
National Front	Avril Downes	219		
Liberal	David Arthur	141		
Turnout			35.9	
Conservative hold		Swing		

=== 1974 election ===
The election took place on 2 May 1974.

1974 Brent London Borough Council election: Wembley Park
Party	Candidate	Votes	%	±%
Conservative	Thomas Gornall	1,877		
Conservative	A. Sharpe	1,845		
Labour	P. Pendsay	476		
Labour	K. Toller	473		
Liberal	V. Goody	393		
Liberal	D. Walsh	349		
Turnout				
Conservative hold		Swing		
Conservative hold		Swing		

=== 1971 election ===
The election took place on 13 May 1971.

1971 Brent London Borough Council election: Wembley Park
Party	Candidate	Votes	%	±%
Conservative	I. Scott	1,750		
Conservative	P. Bance	1,724		
Labour	R. Feather	728		
Labour	K. Toller	685		
Liberal	H. King	275		
Liberal	R. Sowerby	257		
Turnout				
Conservative hold		Swing		
Conservative hold		Swing		

=== 1968 by-election ===
The by-election took place on 27 June 1968.

1968 Wembley Park by-election
Party	Candidate	Votes	%	±%
Conservative	I. Scott	1,496		
Conservative	P. Bance	1,485		
Liberal	C. Coburn	179		
Liberal	L. Butcher	175		
Labour	K. Toller	162		
Labour	R. Feather	156		
Turnout			25.9	
Conservative hold		Swing		
Conservative hold		Swing		

=== 1968 election ===
The election took place on 9 May 1968.

1968 Brent London Borough Council election: Wembley Park
Party	Candidate	Votes	%	±%
Conservative	Thomas Gornall	2,456		
Conservative	A. Sharpe	2,440		
Liberal	R. Bloom	407		
Liberal	A. Brown	395		
Labour	R. Feather	384		
Labour	K. Toller	369		
Turnout				
Conservative win (new seat)				
Conservative win (new seat)				
