= Brent Housing Partnership =

Brent Housing Partnership (BHP) was an arms-length management organisation managing council housing in the London Borough of Brent from 2002 to 2017. Due to BHP's poor performance which left homes in disrepair, the council brought housing management back in-house.
