= Wembley Hill (ward) =

Electoral ward in Brent, London, England

- Electoral ward for the Brent London Borough Council
- Borough: Brent
- County: Greater London
- Population: 15,064 (2021)
- Major settlements: Wembley Hill
- Area: 1.540 km²

Current electoral ward
- Created: 2022
- Number of members: 3
- Councillors: Ihtesham Afza; Ajmal Akram; Ishma Moeen

Wembley Hill is an electoral ward in the London Borough of Brent. The ward was first used in the 2022 elections. It elects three councillors to Brent London Borough Council.

== Geography ==
The ward is named after the area of Wembley Hill. Wembley Hill Road runs south across the ward to Wembley High Road.

Wembley Hill was also the original name for the present Wembley Stadium railway station.

== Councillors ==
Election	Councillors		
2022	Ihtesham Afzal (Labour)	Ajmal Akram (Labour)	Ishma Moeen (Labour)

== Brent Council elections ==
=== 2022 election ===
The election took place on 5 May 2022.

2022 Brent London Borough Council election: Wembley Hill
Party	Candidate	Votes	%	±%
Labour	Ihtesham Afzal	1,526	46.2	
Labour	Akram Ajmal	1,510	45.7	
Labour	Ishma Moeen	1,390	42.1	
Conservative	Floyd Dias Do Rosario	1,299	39.3	
Conservative	Reena De Cruz	1,289	39.0	
Conservative	Sushil Dokwal	1,116	33.8	
Liberal Democrats	Eileen Barker	288	8.7	
Green	Jordan Harris	274	8.3	
Liberal Democrats	Douglas Lee	250	7.6	
Liberal Democrats	Gylnis Lee	206	6.2	
Turnout		3,302	30.1	N/A
Registered electors		10,909		
Labour win (new seat)				
Labour win (new seat)				
Labour win (new seat)				
