= Alperton (ward) =

- Electoral ward for the Brent London Borough Council
- Alperton ward boundaries since 2022
- Borough: Brent
- County: Greater London
- Population: 15,056 (2021) (Note: 2021 Census data reported for 2022 ward boundaries)
- Electorate: 9,988 (2022)
- Major settlements: Alperton
- Area: 1.808 square kilometres (0.698 sq mi)

Current electoral ward
- Created: 1965
- Number of members: 1965–1968: 3; 1968–1978: 2; 1978–present: 3
- Councillors: Bhagwanji Chohan; Hannah Matin; Charlie Clinton
- GSS code: E05000085 (2002–2022); E05013496 (2022–present)

Alperton is an electoral ward in the London Borough of Brent. The ward has existed since the creation of the borough on 1 April 1965 and was first used in the 1964 elections. It returns three councillors to Brent London Borough Council. (Note: Between 1968 and 1978 the ward returned two councillors.)

== Brent council elections since 2022 ==
There was a revision of ward boundaries in Brent in 2022. Some territory went to Tokyngton and Wembley Central and some was gained from Stonebridge.

=== 2025 by-election ===
The by-election took place on 18 February 2025, following the resignation of Anton Georgiou.

2025 Alperton by-election
Party	Candidate	Votes	%	±%
Liberal Democrats	Charlie Clinton	1,743	48.5	+2.0
Labour	Prerna Thakkar	827	23.0	−18.3
Conservative	Harmit Vyas	740	20.6	+8.4
Reform UK	Mahendra Negi	286	8.0	New
Turnout				
Liberal Democrats hold		Swing		

=== 2022 election ===
The election took place on 5 May 2022.

2022 Brent London Borough Council election: Alperton
Party	Candidate	Votes	%	±%
Liberal Democrats	Anton Georgiou	2,108	50.3	
Labour Co-op	Bhagwanji Chohan	1,871	43.0	
Liberal Democrats	Hannah Matin	1,703	39.1	
Labour Co-op	Trupti Sangani	1,688	38.8	
Liberal Democrats	Sandria Terrelonge	1,631	37.5	
Labour Co-op	Mustapha Ishola-Jimoh	1,566	36.0	
Conservative	Yash Patel	553	12.7	
Conservative	Ravindrashinh Dashandi	532	12.2	
Conservative	Urmil Soni	450	10.3	
Turnout		4,352	43.4	
Registered electors		9,988		
Liberal Democrats win (new boundaries)				
Labour Co-op win (new boundaries)				
Liberal Democrats win (new boundaries)				

== 2002–2022 Brent council elections ==
Alperton ward boundaries from 2002 to 2022

There was a revision of ward boundaries in Brent in 2002.

=== 2020 by-election ===
The by-election took place on 23 January 2020, following the resignation of James Allie.

2020 Alperton by-election
Party	Candidate	Votes	%	±%
Liberal Democrats	Anton Georgiou	1,699	39.7	
Labour Co-op	Chetan Harpale	1,304	30.5	
Conservative	Harmit Vyas	900	21.0	
Green	Michaela Lichten	373	8.7	
Turnout		4,352	34.0	
Registered electors				
Liberal Democrats gain from Labour Co-op		Swing		

=== 2018 election ===
The election took place on 3 May 2018.

2018 Brent London Borough Council election: Alperton
Party	Candidate	Votes	%	±%
Labour Co-op	Bhagwanji Chohan	3,185	57.3	
Labour Co-op	James Allie	3,174	57.1	
Labour Co-op	Trupti Sangani	2,961	53.3	
Conservative	Vikas Patel	1,337	24.1	
Conservative	George Fordjour	1,162	20.9	
Conservative	Shamim Chowdhury	1,026	18.5	
Liberal Democrats	Daniel Brown	582	10.5	
Green	Andrew Linnie	577	10.4	
Liberal Democrats	David Johnson	500	9.0	
Liberal Democrats	James Kerr	362	6.5	
Turnout		5,557	46.83	
Labour Co-op hold		Swing		
Labour Co-op hold		Swing		
Labour Co-op hold		Swing		
