= Kilburn (Brent ward) =

Electoral ward in Brent, London, England

- Electoral ward for the Brent London Borough Council
- Borough: Brent
- County: Greater London
- Population: 17,212 (2021)
- Major settlements: Kilburn
- Area: 0.9444 km²

Current electoral ward
- Created: 1965
- Councillors: 3

Kilburn is an electoral ward in the London Borough of Brent. The ward was first used in the 1964 elections. It elects three councillors to Brent London Borough Council.

Kilburn is also the name of a ward of Camden London Borough Council.

== Geography ==
The ward is named after the district of Kilburn.

== Councillors ==
Election	Councillors		
2022	Rita Begum (Labour)	Rita Conneely (Labour)	Anthony Molloy (Labour)

== Elections ==
=== 2022 Brent London Borough Council election ===
Kilburn (3 seats)
Party	Candidate	Votes	%	±%
Labour	Rita Begum	2,115	68.1	+7.0
Labour	Rita Conneely*	2,108	67.9	+2.2
Labour	Anthony Molloy	1,861	60.0	0.00
Green	Nathaniel Williams	679	21.9	New
Liberal Democrats	Anne Sharp	395	12.7	−3.2
Conservative	Katie Doyle	364	11.7	−2.0
Liberal Democrats	Charles Brand	345	11.1	−4.3
Conservative	Mark Roberts	328	10.6	−2.7
Liberal Democrats	Derick Rethans	321	10.3	−1.2
Conservative	Retno Widuri	305	9.8	−2.8
Independent	Sabrina Bell	123	4.0	New
Turnout		3,105	25.2	−8.3
Registered electors		12,248		
Labour hold		Swing	+5.1	
Labour hold		Swing	+2.1	
Labour hold		Swing	+2.1	
