= Roundwood (ward) =

Electoral ward in Brent, London, England

- Electoral ward for the Brent London Borough Council
- Borough: Brent
- County: Greater London
- Population: 16,707 (2021)
- Area: 1.856 km²

Current electoral ward
- Created: 2022
- Councillors: 3

Roundwood is an electoral ward in the London Borough of Brent. The ward was first used in the 2022 elections. It elects three councillors to Brent London Borough Council.

== Geography ==
The ward is named after the area of Roundwood.

== Councillors ==
Election	Councillors		
2022	Elliot Chappell (Labour)	Fleur Donnelly-Jackson (Labour)	Jake Rubin (Labour)

== Elections ==
=== 2022 ===
Roundwood (3 seats)
Party	Candidate	Votes	%	±%
Labour	Elliot Chappell*	2,060	75.6	
Labour	Fleur Donnelly-Jackson*	2,034	74.6	
Labour	Jake Rubin	1,873	68.7	
Green	Marion Dunmore	466	17.1	
Conservative	Elizabeth Inglis	400	14.7	
Conservative	George Appiah-Fordjour	396	14.5	
Conservative	Gerald Soames	319	11.7	
Turnout		2,726	25.1	N/A
Registered electors		10,791		
Labour win (new seat)				
Labour win (new seat)				
Labour win (new seat)				
