= Stonebridge (ward) =

Electoral ward in Brent, London, England

- Electoral ward for the Brent London Borough Council
- Borough: Brent
- County: Greater London
- Population: 20,255 (2021)
- Major settlements: Stonebridge
- Area: 4.057 km²

Current electoral ward
- Created: 1965
- Number of members: 3 (since 2002); 2 (1964 to 2002)
- Councillors: Abdi Aden; Promise Knight; Tony Ethapemi

Stonebridge is an electoral ward in the London Borough of Brent. The ward was first used in the 1964 elections. It elects three councillors to Brent London Borough Council.

== Geography ==
The ward is named after the suburb of Stonebridge.

== Councillors ==
Election	Councillors		
2022	Abdi Aden (Labour)	Tony Ethapemi (Labour)	Promise Knight (Labour)

== Elections ==
=== 2022 Brent London Borough Council election ===
Stonebridge (3 seats)
Party	Candidate	Votes	%	±%
Labour	Abdi Aden*	2,266	74.4	
Labour	Promise Knight*	2,060	67.6	
Labour	Tony Ethapemi*	2,028	66.6	
Green	Simon Erskine	469	15.4	
Conservative	Said Deria	463	15.2	
Conservative	Harry Quainoo	421	13.8	
Conservative	Ajoy Roy	406	13.3	
Turnout		3,046	22.3	−8.7
Registered electors		13,593		
Labour hold		Swing		
Labour hold		Swing		
Labour hold		Swing		
