= Sudbury (ward) =

Electoral ward in Brent, London, England

- Electoral ward for the Brent London Borough Council
- Borough: Brent
- County: Greater London
- Population: 13,938 (2021)
- Major settlements: Sudbury
- Area: 1.686 km²

Current electoral ward
- Created: 1965
- Councillors: 2 (since 2022); 3 (1994-2022); 2 (1968-1994); 3 (1964-1968)

Sudbury is an electoral ward in the London Borough of Brent. The ward was first used in the 1964 elections. It elects three councillors to Brent London Borough Council.

== Geography ==
The ward is named after the suburb of Sudbury.

== Councillors ==
Election	Councillors	
2022	Teo Benea (Labour)	Paul Lorber (Liberal Democrats)

== Elections ==
=== 2022 ===
Sudbury (2 seats)
Party	Candidate	Votes	%	±%
Liberal Democrats	Paul Lorber	1,514	44.2	+5.7
Labour	Teo Benea	1,492	43.5	−5.9
Labour	Thomas Stephens*	1,424	41.6	−1.6
Liberal Democrats	Kalpana Rawal	1,320	38.5	+5.8
Conservative	Pinakin Raval	409	11.9	−0.8
Conservative	Chintan Zaveri	318	9.3	−1.4
Turnout		3,426	36.8	−7.3
Registered electors		9,240		
Liberal Democrats gain from Labour		Swing	+3.65	
Labour hold		Swing	-5.85	
