= Brent London Borough Council =

Local government authority in the UK

- Whole council elected every four years
- Coat of arms

- Council logo

Type
- Type: London borough council of the London Borough of Brent
- Houses: Unicameral

Leadership
- Mayor: Amer Agha, Labour since 20 May 2026
- Leader: Muhammed Butt, Labour since 16 May 2012
- Chief Executive: Kim Wright since May 2023

Structure
- Seats: 57 councillors
- Political groups: Administration (26) Labour (26) Other parties (31) Conservatives (11) Liberal Democrats (11) Green (9)
- Length of term: Whole council elected every four years

Elections
- Voting system: Plurality at-large (FPTP)
- Last election: 7 May 2026
- Next election: 2030

Meeting place
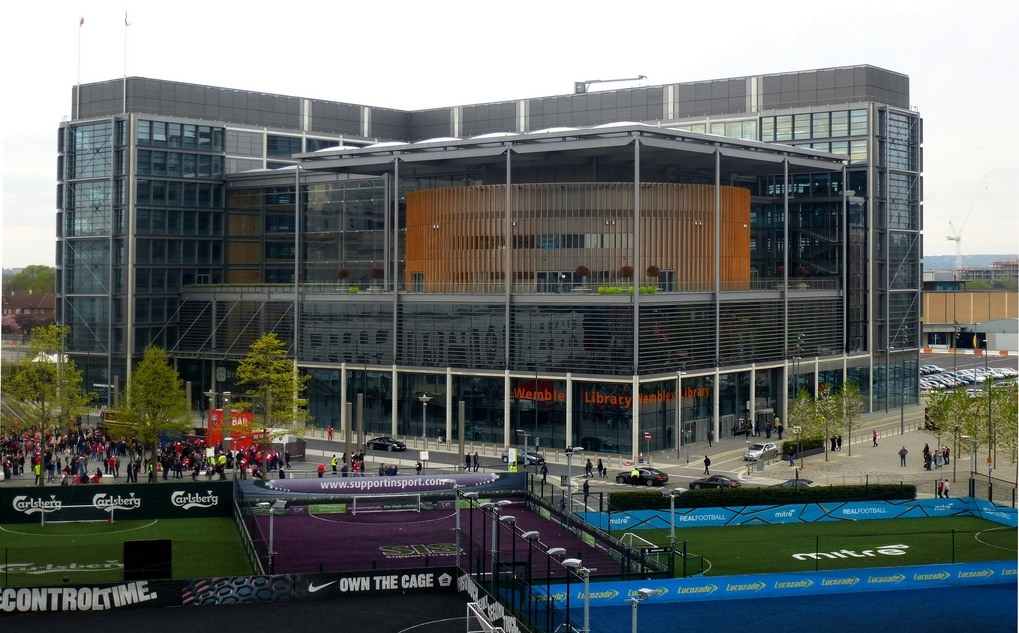
- Brent Civic Centre, Engineers Way, Wembley, HA9 0FJ

Website
- www.brent.gov.uk

Brent London Borough Council, also known as Brent Council, is the local authority for the London Borough of Brent in Greater London, England. The council is responsible for the provision of a range of services within the borough. The council has been under no overall control since May 2026, led by a Labour minority administration. It is based at Brent Civic Centre in Engineers Way, Wembley.

== History ==
The London Borough of Brent and its council were created under the London Government Act 1963, with the first election held in 1964. For its first year the council acted as a shadow authority alongside the area's two outgoing authorities, being the borough councils of Wembley and Willesden. The new council formally came into its powers on 1 April 1965, at which point the old districts and their councils were abolished.

The council's full legal name is the "Mayor and Burgesses of the London Borough of Brent", although it styles itself Brent Council.

From 1965 until 1986 the council was a lower-tier authority, with upper-tier functions provided by the Greater London Council. The split of powers and functions meant that the Greater London Council was responsible for "wide area" services such as fire, ambulance, flood prevention, and refuse disposal; with the boroughs (including Brent) responsible for "personal" services such as social care, libraries, cemeteries and refuse collection. As an outer London borough council Brent has been a local education authority since 1965. The Greater London Council was abolished in 1986 and its functions passed to the London Boroughs, with some services provided through joint committees.

Since 2000 the Greater London Authority has taken some responsibility for highways and planning control from the council, but within the English local government system the council remains a "most purpose" authority in terms of the available range of powers and functions.

On Valentine's Day in 2016, the Council launched its ‘Love Where You Live’ campaign, an initiative which encouraged local people to work alongside the Council and make Brent a better, happier place to live. Groups such as Kensal Green Streets, Harlesden Environmental Action Residents, Northwest TWO and Keep Wembley Tidy all took action as a result of the campaign. In June 2016, a short, community-based documentary called ‘Stories of Brent’ was produced, based on the campaign, starring Audley Harrison, Rachel Yankey and Liz Mitchell from Boney M. Brent was the London Borough of Culture in 2020, receiving £1.35m of funding under a new initiative launched by the Mayor of London, Sadiq Khan.

== Powers and functions ==
The local authority derives its powers and functions from the London Government Act 1963 and subsequent legislation, and has the powers and functions of a London borough council. It sets council tax and as a billing authority it also collects precepts for Greater London Authority functions and business rates. It sets planning policies which complement Greater London Authority and national policies, and decides on almost all planning applications accordingly. It is also the local education authority.

== Political control ==
The council has been under no overall control since May 2026.

The first election to the council was held in 1964, initially operating as a shadow authority alongside the outgoing authorities until the new arrangements came into effect on 1 April 1965. Political control of the council since 1965 has been as follows:

Party in control	Years
Labour	1965–1968
Conservative	1968–1971
Labour	1971–1982
No overall control	1982–1986
Labour	1986–1990
No overall control	1990–1998
Labour	1998–2006
No overall control	2006–2010
Labour	2010–2026
No overall control	2026-

=== Leadership ===
Political leadership is provided by the leader of the council. The role of mayor is largely ceremonial in Brent. The leaders since 1965 have been:

Councillor	Party	From	To
George Swannell	Labour	1965	1968
Edwin Lee	Conservative	1968	1971
Philip Hartley	Labour	1971	1977
James Goudie	Labour	1977	1978
John Lebor	Labour	1978	1981
Tom Bryson	Labour	1981	1983
Martin Coleman	Labour	1983	1986
Merle Amory	Labour	1986	1988
Dorman Long	Labour	1988	1990
Bob Blackman	Conservative	1990	1996
Paul Daisley	Labour	Apr 1996	2001
Ann John	Labour	2001	May 2006
Paul Lorber	Liberal Democrats	26 Jun 2006	May 2010
Ann John	Labour	26 May 2010	May 2012
Muhammed Butt	Labour	16 May 2012	Incumbent

== Elections ==
Since the last boundary changes in 2022 the council has comprised 57 councillors representing 22 wards, with each ward electing two or three councillors. Elections are held every four years.

Following the 2026 election the composition of the council was:

Party	Councillors
Labour	26
Conservative	11
Liberal Democrats	11
Green	9
Total	57

The next election is due in May 2030.

== Premises ==
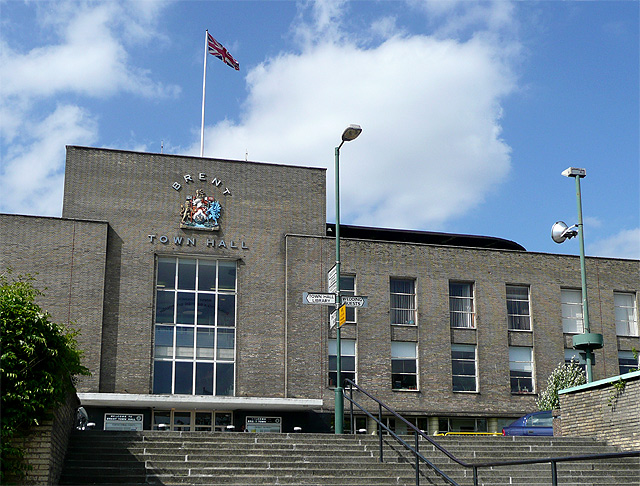
Brent Town Hall, formerly Wembley Town Hall: Council's headquarters until 2013

The council is based at Brent Civic Centre on Engineers Way in the Wembley Park area of the borough. The building was purpose-built for the council and opened in 2013. Prior to 2013 the council was based at Brent Town Hall, on Forty Lane in Wembley, which had been completed in 1940 for the old Wembley Borough Council, originally being called Wembley Town Hall.

== See also ==
- Brent Housing Partnership
