= 2014 Brent London Borough Council election =

2014 local election in England

- 22 May 2014

All 63 seats to Brent London Borough Council 32 seats needed for a majority

	First party	Second party	Third party
Party	Labour	Conservative	Liberal Democrats
Last election	40 seats, 41.1%	6 seats, 22.0%	17 seats, 29.4%
Seats won	56	6	1
Seat change	▲16	Steady	▼16
Popular vote	39,870	17,547	14,997
Percentage	46.8%	20.6%	17.6%
Swing	▲5.7%	▼1.4%	▼11.8%
- Map of the results of the 2014 Brent London Borough Council election. Labour in red, Conservatives in blue and Liberal Democrats in yellow.
Council control before election
Labour
Council control after election
Labour

The 2014 Brent London Borough Council election took place on 22 May 2014 to elect members of Brent London Borough Council in London, England. The whole council was up for election and the Labour Party stayed in overall control of the council.

== Background ==
At the last election in 2010 Labour gained control of the council with 40 councillors, compared to 17 for the Liberal Democrats and 6 for the Conservatives. In July 2012 the Labour majority was increased when a Liberal Democrat councillor for Alperton, James Allie, defected to the Labour party. The Liberal Democrats lost another councillor in June 2013 when Brondesbury Park councillor Carol Shaw switched back to the Conservatives, ten years after she had defected from the Conservatives to the Liberal Democrats. However the Liberal Democrats did gain from a defection, when in December 2013 a Welsh Harp councillor Dhiraj Kataria left Labour to join the Liberal Democrats.

A seat was vacant before the 2010 election in Dudden Hill, after Liberal Democrat councillor David Clues resigned from the council less than 6 months before the election, after having moved to Brighton. A total of 222 candidates stood for election in 2010, contesting the 63 seats on the council across 21 wards. The candidates included full slates from the Labour, Liberal Democrat and Conservative parties, as well as Green Party candidates across the council and a number of UK Independence Party, Trade Unionist and Socialist Coalition and independent candidates.

== Election result ==
Labour increased their majority on the council making 16 gains and reducing the Liberal Democrats to just 1 seat on the council. Labour gained seats in Alperton, Dollis Hill, Dudden Hill, Mapesbury, Queens Park, Sudbury, Welsh Harp and Willesden Green from the Liberal Democrats, as well as seats in Northwick Park and Preston from the Conservatives. The 15 seats lost by the Liberal Democrats included the group leader Paul Lorber in Sudbury and meant Helen Carr in Mapesbury was the only Liberal Democrat remaining on the council.

The Conservatives stayed steady on 6 councillors after losing seats to Labour, but gaining 2 seats from the Liberal Democrats in Brondesbury Park. They finished second in vote share with 21%, but well behind Labour who got 47% of the vote. Overall turnout at the election was 36%.

Following the election Labour councillor Muhammed Butt remained leader of the council, defeating a challenge within his party from Neil Nerva. Meanwhile, the Conservative group split in half, with the 3 councillors from Brondesbury Park ward forming their own Brondesbury Park Conservatives group, after failing to replace Kenton councillor Suresh Kansahra as leader of the Conservative group, while the 3 Kenton Conservative councillors remained in the Conservative group.

Brent local election result 2014
Party	Seats	Gains	Losses	Net gain/loss	Seats %	Votes %	Votes	+/−
Labour	56			+16	88.9	46.8	39,870	+5.7
Conservative	6			±0	9.5	20.6	17,547	-1.4
Liberal Democrats	1			-16	1.6	17.6	14,997	-11.8
Green	0			0	0.0	10.8	9,214	+3.9
UKIP	0			0	0.0	1.8	1,505	New
TUSC	0			0	0.0	1.0	875	New
Make Willesden Green	0			0	0.0	1.0	846	New
Independent	0			0	0.0	0.3	298	-0.2

== Ward results ==
=== Alperton ===
Alperton (3 seats)
Party	Candidate	Votes	%	±%
Labour	James Allie	2,370	47.1	+0.7
Labour	Mili Patel	2,309	45.9	+6.6
Labour	Bhagwanji Chohan	2,305	45.8	−0.4
Liberal Democrats	Daniel Brown	1,691	33.6	−12.7
Liberal Democrats	Trusha Patel	1,669	33.1	−13.3
Liberal Democrats	Samira Ahmed	1,553	30.8	−6.9
Conservative	Shamim Chowdhury	612	12.2	−5.1
Conservative	Ramila Mistry	506	10.0	−6.1
Conservative	Gerald Soames	452	9.0	−5.8
Green	Yusuf Akram	325	6.5	+1.8
Turnout		5,035	46	−8
Labour gain from Liberal Democrats		Swing		
Labour gain from Liberal Democrats		Swing		
Labour hold		Swing		

=== Barnhill ===
Barnhill (3 seats)
Party	Candidate	Votes	%	±%
Labour	Sarah-Louise Marquis	2,055	55.5	+4.7
Labour	Shafique Choudhary	2,010	54.3	+9.9
Labour	Michael Pavey	1,988	53.7	+10.4
Conservative	Janu Kotecha	1,023	27.6	−10.4
Conservative	Kanta Pindoria	983	26.6	−7.6
Conservative	Jahan Mahmoodi	911	24.6	−8.5
Liberal Democrats	Karen Brown	352	9.5	−8.4
Green	Giovanna Dunmall	335	9.1	+1.4
Liberal Democrats	Christine Barratt	233	6.3	−10.1
Liberal Democrats	Bruce Thomson	174	4.7	−9.8
Independent	Elcena Jeffers	139	3.8	N/A
Turnout		3,700	32	−18
Labour hold		Swing		
Labour hold		Swing		
Labour hold		Swing		

=== Brondesbury Park ===
Brondesbury Park (3 seats)
Party	Candidate	Votes	%	±%
Conservative	Carol Shaw	1,634	49.7	−4.1
Conservative	Joel Davidson	1,162	35.3	+6.3
Conservative	John Warren	1,118	34.0	+8.4
Labour	Michael Adeyeye	993	30.2	+1.5
Labour	David Lister	939	28.5	+2.9
Labour	Terry Hoad	919	27.9	+6.6
Liberal Democrats	Barry Cheese	630	19.1	−22.9
Green	Rai Shamon	520	15.8	+6.6
Liberal Democrats	Mark Cummins	451	13.7	−24.5
Liberal Democrats	Maurice O'Neill	388	11.8	−42.0
Turnout		3,291	37	−15
Conservative gain from Liberal Democrats		Swing		
Conservative gain from Liberal Democrats		Swing		
Conservative gain from Liberal Democrats		Swing		

=== Dollis Hill ===
Dollis Hill (3 seats)
Party	Candidate	Votes	%	±%
Labour	Parvez Ahmed	1,715	43.8	+2.6
Labour	Arshad Mahmood	1,669	42.6	+1.7
Labour	Liz Dixon	1,566	39.9	+1.0
Liberal Democrats	Alison Hopkins	1,515	38.6	−5.1
Liberal Democrats	Alex Melia	1,175	30.0	−13.0
Liberal Democrats	Mohammad Anwar	1,172	29.9	−12.0
Conservative	Rbee Mehmood	536	13.7	−6.3
Conservative	Suresh Prajapati	442	11.3	−7.1
Conservative	Gopal Sachdev	393	10.0	−4.8
Green	Pete Murry	288	7.3	+2.7
Turnout		3,920	44	−8
Labour gain from Liberal Democrats		Swing		
Labour gain from Liberal Democrats		Swing		
Labour gain from Liberal Democrats		Swing		

=== Dudden Hill ===
Dudden Hill (3 seats)
Party	Candidate	Votes	%	±%
Labour	Aslam Choudry	2,051	48.9	+2.0
Labour	Janice Long	1,895	45.2	+9.4
Labour	Krupesh Hirani	1,851	44.1	+6.2
Liberal Democrats	Anton Georgiou	1,107	26.4	−16.7
Liberal Democrats	Richard Sisson	961	22.9	−14.0
Liberal Democrats	Costel Cam	957	22.8	−14.0
Green	Simone Aspis	538	12.8	+4.4
Conservative	Theresa Baker	471	11.2	−4.8
Conservative	Sanjay Patel	389	9.3	−3.9
Conservative	Jane Sayers	385	9.2	−2.7
UKIP	Heino Vockrodt	292	7.0	N/A
TUSC	Sandra De Andrade	144	3.4	N/A
Turnout		4,194	41	−10
Labour hold		Swing		
Labour gain from Liberal Democrats		Swing		
Labour hold		Swing		

=== Fryent ===
Fryent (3 seats)
Party	Candidate	Votes	%	±%
Labour	George Crane	2,043	61.5	+6.6
Labour	Ruth Moher	1,993	60.0	+10.6
Labour	Shama Tatler	1,708	51.4	−0.2
Conservative	Amit Lakhani	916	27.6	−1.8
Conservative	Mick Iqbal	845	25.4	−3.5
Conservative	Bhavisha Panchal	746	22.4	−3.8
Green	Claire McCarthy	422	12.7	+6.0
Liberal Democrats	Beatrice Cam	301	9.1	−8.7
Liberal Democrats	Arvind Patel	208	6.3	−9.5
Liberal Democrats	Murari Sharma	96	2.9	−12.4
Turnout		3,323	35	−19
Labour hold		Swing		
Labour hold		Swing		
Labour hold		Swing		

=== Harlesden ===
Harlesden (3 seats)
Party	Candidate	Votes	%	±%
Labour	Aisha Eniola	2,160	69.3	+3.4
Labour	Lloyd McLeish	2,031	65.1	+3.8
Labour	Bobby Thomas	2,017	64.7	+8.5
Green	Simon Erskine	459	14.7	+8.5
Liberal Democrats	William Motley	387	12.4	−17.6
TUSC	John Boyle	359	11.5	N/A
Liberal Democrats	Paul Fowler	313	10.0	−15.3
Liberal Democrats	Philip Whittle	283	9.1	−15.2
Conservative	Brindanand Camadoo	276	8.8	−0.7
Conservative	Arthi Prajapati	270	8.7	+0.9
Conservative	Vijaya Rabadia	249	8.0	+1.5
Turnout		3,119	30	−19
Labour hold		Swing		
Labour hold		Swing		
Labour hold		Swing		

=== Kensal Green ===
Kensal Green (3 seats)
Party	Candidate	Votes	%	±%
Labour	Claudia Hector	1,819	59.1	+12.9
Labour	Dan Filson	1,808	58.7	+14.8
Labour	Matt Kelcher	1,730	56.2	+18.3
Green	Sally Ibbotson	621	20.2	+6.3
Liberal Democrats	Heather James	510	16.6	−17.4
Liberal Democrats	Deborah Sutherland	502	16.3	−20.3
Liberal Democrats	Callum Biggins	481	15.6	−17.8
Conservative	Michael Doku	394	12.8	−3.3
Conservative	Pamela Rice	382	12.4	+0.3
Conservative	Josephine Poku	330	10.7	−0.3
Turnout		3,080	33	−19
Labour hold		Swing		
Labour hold		Swing		
Labour hold		Swing		

=== Kenton ===
Kenton (3 seats)
Party	Candidate	Votes	%	±%
Conservative	Suresh Kansagra	1,798	53.2	+15.2
Conservative	Reg Colwill	1,796	53.1	+9.7
Conservative	Bhiku Patel	1,669	49.4	+3.7
Labour	Syed Alam	1,139	33.7	−2.4
Labour	Lewis Hodgetts	1,040	30.8	+1.0
Labour	Nadhim Ahmed	946	28.0	−1.3
Green	Graham Allen	348	10.3	+5.6
Liberal Democrats	Violet Steele	221	6.5	−10.0
Liberal Democrats	Vivienne Williamson	153	4.5	−8.2
Liberal Democrats	Ieva Tomsone	125	3.7	−6.6
Turnout		3,381	36	−22
Conservative hold		Swing		
Conservative hold		Swing		
Conservative hold		Swing		

=== Kilburn ===
Kilburn (3 seats)
Party	Candidate	Votes	%	±%
Labour	John Duffy	2,162	59.2	+3.6
Labour	Rita Conneely	2,147	58.8	+14.8
Labour	Tayo Oladapo	1,965	53.8	+14.2
Green	Nas Belazka	733	20.1	+5.7
Conservative	Matt Jones	582	15.9	−1.8
Conservative	Louie Brockbank	517	14.2	−1.6
Conservative	Chris Gallagher	512	14.0	−0.7
Liberal Democrats	Diana Ayres	470	12.9	−23.7
Liberal Democrats	George Avionitis	361	9.9	−19.7
Liberal Democrats	Edward Round	321	8.8	−16.4
TUSC	Izzie Counihan-Sanchez	224	6.1	N/A
Turnout		3,650	32	−20
Labour hold		Swing		
Labour hold		Swing		
Labour hold		Swing		

=== Mapesbury ===
Mapesbury (3 seats)
Party	Candidate	Votes	%	±%
Labour	Lia Colacicco	1,402	39.8	+4.3
Labour	Ahmad Shahzad	1,278	36.3	+3.7
Liberal Democrats	Helen Carr	1,257	35.7	−8.2
Labour	Columbus Moloney	1,241	35.3	+3.4
Liberal Democrats	Paul Edgeworth	1,179	33.5	−6.6
Liberal Democrats	Lauren Keith	1,067	30.3	−7.3
Green	Scott Bartle	776	22.0	+8.8
Conservative	Bertha Joseph	445	12.6	−5.8
Conservative	William McGowan	416	11.8	−9.5
Conservative	Samer Ahmedali	408	11.6	−5.2
Turnout		3,520	35	−15
Labour gain from Liberal Democrats		Swing		
Labour gain from Liberal Democrats		Swing		
Liberal Democrats hold		Swing		

=== Northwick Park ===
Northwick Park (3 seats)
Party	Candidate	Votes	%	±%
Labour	Keith Perrin	1,694	46.2	+8.1
Labour	Margaret McLennan	1,616	44.1	+3.2
Labour	Joshua Murray	1,599	43.6	+5.7
Conservative	Kishan Devani	1,579	43.1	+0.4
Conservative	John Detre	1,550	42.3	+3.0
Conservative	Harihar Patel	1,493	40.7	−1.5
Green	Mimi Kaltman	263	7.2	+0.7
Liberal Democrats	Gillian Conduit	219	6.0	−15.4
Liberal Democrats	Janet Robb	171	4.7	−16.5
Liberal Democrats	Freda Raingold	136	3.7	−14.4
Turnout		3,666	38	−15
Labour gain from Conservative		Swing		
Labour gain from Conservative		Swing		
Labour hold		Swing		

=== Preston ===
Preston (3 seats)
Party	Candidate	Votes	%	±%
Labour	Matthew Bradley	1,712	44.3	+2.8
Labour	Patricia Harrison	1,671	43.2	−6.1
Labour	Jean Hossain	1,549	40.1	−2.8
Conservative	Harshadbhai Patel	1,428	36.9	−7.8
Conservative	Michael Maurice	1,339	34.6	−1.7
Conservative	Monica Patel	1,334	34.5	+1.0
UKIP	Jeffrey Deen	345	8.9	N/A
Green	May Erskine	317	8.2	+1.0
Liberal Democrats	Eileen Barker	260	6.7	−13.4
Liberal Democrats	Jacqueline Bunce-Linsell	245	6.3	−9.3
Liberal Democrats	David Johnson	211	5.5	−9.5
TUSC	Paul Summers	148	3.8	N/A
Turnout		3,867	36	−15
Labour hold		Swing		
Labour gain from Conservative		Swing		
Labour hold		Swing		

=== Queens Park ===
Queens Park (3 seats)
Party	Candidate	Votes	%	±%
Labour	James Denselow	1,727	49.3	+12.1
Labour	Neil Nerva	1,650	47.1	+10.8
Labour	Eleanor Southwood	1,587	45.3	+10.1
Conservative	Jennifer Powers	784	22.4	−1.4
Green	Alex Freed	750	21.4	+9.0
Liberal Democrats	Virginia Bonham Carter	723	20.6	−19.6
Conservative	Shaun Rosse	708	20.2	−3.0
Conservative	Abdul Alawiye	624	17.8	−3.1
Liberal Democrats	Isabella Thomas	549	15.7	−18.8
Liberal Democrats	Jonathan Bertulis-Fernandes	520	14.8	−16.1
Turnout		3,506	34	−22
Labour gain from Liberal Democrats		Swing		
Labour hold		Swing		
Labour hold		Swing		

=== Queensbury ===
Queensbury (3 seats)
Party	Candidate	Votes	%	±%
Labour	Sandra Kabir	2,114	46.5	−1.8
Labour	Ramesh Patel	2,022	44.5	−7.8
Labour	Kana Naheerathan	1,981	43.6	−0.9
Conservative	Kanta Mistry	1,877	41.3	−3.1
Conservative	Snehal Mehta	1,669	36.7	+7.4
Conservative	Jayanti Patel	1,644	36.1	+7.5
UKIP	Barry Cameron	421	9.3	N/A
Green	Adlen Biloum	332	7.3	+0.9
Liberal Democrats	Valerie Brown	252	5.5	−13.0
Liberal Democrats	John Lewis	209	4.6	−10.4
Liberal Democrats	Peggy Cruickshank	170	3.7	−11.4
Turnout		4,548	41	−14
Labour hold		Swing		
Labour hold		Swing		
Labour hold		Swing		

=== Stonebridge ===
Stonebridge (3 seats)
Party	Candidate	Votes	%	±%
Labour	Sabina Khan	2,638	75.0	+10.4
Labour	Ernest Ezeajughi	2,522	71.7	+11.9
Labour	Zaffar Kalwala	2,386	67.9	+12.2
Liberal Democrats	Susan Lake	406	11.5	−16.2
Liberal Democrats	Donald MacArthur	356	10.1	−16.9
Conservative	Summer Jafferali	331	9.4	+0.4
Conservative	Rohit Patel	317	9.0	+0.3
Green	Brian Orr	289	8.2	+1.5
Liberal Democrats	Dineshkumar Shah	260	7.4	−19.0
Conservative	Pritul Rabadia	252	7.2	−1.2
Turnout		3,516	33	−18
Labour hold		Swing		
Labour hold		Swing		
Labour hold		Swing		

=== Sudbury ===
Sudbury (3 seats)
Party	Candidate	Votes	%	±%
Labour	Mary Daly	2,038	47.6	+3.2
Labour	Aisha Hoda-Benn	1,862	43.5	+2.6
Labour	Abdi Aden	1,810	42.3	+1.8
Liberal Democrats	Paul Lorber	1,651	38.6	−9.5
Liberal Democrats	Deven Shah	1,431	33.5	−10.7
Liberal Democrats	Bob Wharton	1,379	32.2	−5.4
Conservative	Jessica Bhardwaj	549	12.8	−6.6
Conservative	Lewis Owen	460	10.8	−5.6
Conservative	Badrul Haque	407	9.5	−6.6
Green	Manish Patel	309	7.2	+2.2
Independent	Toby Chambers	159	3.7	N/A
Turnout		4,278	42	−8
Labour gain from Liberal Democrats		Swing		
Labour hold		Swing		
Labour gain from Liberal Democrats		Swing		

=== Tokyngton ===
Tokyngton (3 seats)
Party	Candidate	Votes	%	±%
Labour	Muhammed Butt	2,247	60.0	+9.0
Labour	Ketan Sheth	2,143	57.2	+10.8
Labour	Orleen Hylton	1,990	53.1	+4.2
Conservative	Jimmy Desai	816	21.8	+3.2
Conservative	Jennifer Brown	701	18.7	+5.1
Conservative	Mesbah Uddin	573	15.3	+2.7
Liberal Democrats	Vijya Bhudia	502	13.4	−24.4
Green	Khalid Akram	425	11.3	+6.3
Liberal Democrats	Chunilal Hirani	406	10.8	−23.3
Liberal Democrats	Naim Hasani	369	9.9	−21.4
Turnout		3,745	32	−21
Labour hold		Swing		
Labour hold		Swing		
Labour hold		Swing		

=== Welsh Harp ===
Welsh Harp (3 seats)
Party	Candidate	Votes	%	±%
Labour	Roxanne Mashari	1,833	54.8	+9.5
Labour	Amer Agha	1,831	54.8	+9.3
Labour	Harbi Farah	1,653	49.5	+4.5
Conservative	Sylvia Drab	690	20.6	−1.7
Conservative	Richard Lacey	601	18.0	−2.5
Conservative	Mohammed Alghoul	547	16.4	−3.7
UKIP	Syed Hussain	447	13.4	N/A
Green	Jafar Hassan	351	10.5	+1.3
Liberal Democrats	Patricia Ratnayake	334	10.0	−22.3
Liberal Democrats	Mario Tchiqurina	220	6.6	−25.4
Liberal Democrats	Ulla Thiessen	219	6.6	−25.3
Turnout		3,342	35	−16
Labour gain from Liberal Democrats		Swing		
Labour hold		Swing		
Labour hold		Swing		

=== Wembley Central ===
Wembley Central (3 seats)
Party	Candidate	Votes	%	±%
Labour	Krupa Sheth	2,228	51.6	+1.6
Labour	Wilhelmina Murray	1,990	46.1	+3.1
Labour	Sam Stopp	1,726	40.0	−4.4
Liberal Democrats	Jyotshna Patel	1,571	36.4	−3.6
Liberal Democrats	Dhiraj Kataria	1,400	32.4	−3.8
Liberal Democrats	Daniel Bessong	1,300	30.1	−7.2
Conservative	Abirami Senthilnathan	525	12.2	−8.9
Conservative	Mohammed Ahmed	470	10.9	−9.7
Conservative	Mohammed Shaikh	402	9.3	−8.9
Green	Kolos Csontos	282	6.5	+2.5
Turnout		4,318	39	−11
Labour hold		Swing		
Labour hold		Swing		
Labour hold		Swing		

=== Willesden Green ===
Willesden Green (3 seats)
Party	Candidate	Votes	%	±%
Labour	Lesley Jones	1,730	52.9	+9.9
Labour	Bernard Collier	1,628	49.8	+11.0
Labour	Tom Miller	1,446	44.2	+8.5
Make Willesden Green	Alex Colas	846	25.9	N/A
Liberal Democrats	Omar Deedat	638	19.5	−24.8
Green	Martin Francis	531	16.2	+5.4
Green	Shahrar Ali	520	15.9	+6.0
Liberal Democrats	Ibrahim Jahangir	480	14.7	−27.0
Liberal Democrats	Mayanthie Wijesuriya	425	13.0	−27.4
Conservative	Joan Padro	281	8.6	−3.3
Conservative	Shahin Chowdhury	267	8.2	−2.4
Conservative	Ali Jawad	251	7.7	−1.8
Turnout		3,268	34	−13
Labour gain from Liberal Democrats		Swing		
Labour hold		Swing		
Labour gain from Liberal Democrats		Swing		
