= 2010 Brent London Borough Council election =

2010 local election in England

- 6 May 2010

All 63 seats to Brent London Borough Council 32 seats needed for a majority

	First party	Second party	Third party
Party	Labour	Liberal Democrats	Conservative
Last election	21 seats, 34.4%	27 seats, 27.8%	15 seats, 27.3%
Seats won	40	17	6
Seat change	▲19	▼10	▼9
Popular vote	50,963	36,468	27,356
Percentage	41.1%	29.4%	22.0%
Swing	▲6.7%	▲1.6%	▼5.3%
- Map of the results of the 2010 Brent London Borough Council election. Labour in red, Liberal Democrats in yellow and Conservatives in blue.
Council control before election
No overall control
Council control after election
Labour

The 2010 Brent London Borough Council election took place on 6 May 2010 to elect members of Brent London Borough Council in London, England. The whole council was up for election and the Labour Party gained overall control of the council from no overall control.

== Background ==
After the last election in 2006 the Liberal Democrats were the largest party with 27 councillors, compared to 21 for Labour and 15 for the Conservatives. However between 2006 and 2010 there were a number of changes in the party composition, with firstly in 2007 a councillor for Kensal Green, Berth Joseph defecting from Labour to the Conservatives. Joseph, after having been suspended from the council for 6 months in 2009, would go to contest the 2010 election as an independent.

Meanwhile, in 2009 a second Labour councillor, Francis Eniola of Welsh Harp ward, also defected to the Conservatives. The Conservatives meanwhile had lost 2 councillors in 2008 when Queensbury councillors Robert Dunwell and Atiq Malik left the party to form their own Democratic Conservative Group.

Labour aimed to regain control of the council in 2010 and targeted the wards of Dollis Hill, Kilburn, Queensbury, Tokyngton and Willesden, while also fighting to hold Fryent ward. Since 2006 the council had been controlled by a coalition between the Liberal Democrats and Conservatives.

== Election result ==
Labour gained control of the council after making a net gain of 19 seats from both the Liberal Democrats and Conservatives. This took Labour to 40 seats, while the Liberal Democrats dropped to 17 seats and the Conservatives were reduced to 6 seats.

Brent local election result 2010
Party	Seats	Gains	Losses	Net gain/loss	Seats %	Votes %	Votes	+/−
Labour	40			+19	63.5	41.1	50,963	+6.7
Liberal Democrats	17			-10	27.0	29.4	36,468	+1.6
Conservative	6			-9	9.5	22.0	27,356	-5.3
Green	0			0	0.0	6.9	8,612	-2.2
Independent	0			0	0.0	0.5	573	-0.2
BNP	0			0	0.0	0.1	163	New

== Ward results ==
=== Alperton ===
Alperton (3 seats)
Party	Candidate	Votes	%	±%
Liberal Democrats	James Allie	2,608	46.4	
Liberal Democrats	Daniel Brown	2,599	46.3	
Labour	Bhagwanji Chohan	2,594	46.2	
Labour	Harbi Farah	2,206	39.3	
Liberal Democrats	Murugesu Sivarajah	2,115	37.7	
Labour	Mustapha Ishola-Jimoh	1,970	35.1	
Conservative	Bavesh Dodiya	970	17.3	
Conservative	Aurel Dedi	905	16.1	
Conservative	Reoland Sinanaj	830	14.8	
Green	Javed Aslam	266	4.7	
Green	Sheik Sethi	230	4.1	
Green	Lydia Willocks	190	3.4	
Independent	Noel Coonan	123	2.2	
Turnout		5,669	54	+13
Liberal Democrats hold		Swing		
Liberal Democrats hold		Swing		
Labour gain from Liberal Democrats		Swing		

=== Barnhill ===
Barnhill (3 seats)
Party	Candidate	Votes	%	±%
Labour	Judith Beckman	2,796	50.8	
Labour	Mohammed Choudhary	2,440	44.4	
Labour	Abdifatah Aden	2,382	43.3	
Conservative	James O'Sullivan	2,091	38.0	
Conservative	Suresh Kansagra	1,879	34.2	
Conservative	Irwin Van Cole	1,818	33.1	
Liberal Democrats	Sarah MacDougall	987	17.9	
Liberal Democrats	Samira Khan	903	16.4	
Liberal Democrats	Martin Short	799	14.5	
Green	Martin Francis	421	7.7	
Green	Aatif Nawaz	343	6.2	
Green	Ruth Breznay	310	5.6	
Turnout		5,552	50	+17
Labour gain from Conservative		Swing		
Labour gain from Conservative		Swing		
Labour gain from Conservative		Swing		

=== Brondesbury Park ===
Brondesbury Park (3 seats)
Party	Candidate	Votes	%	±%
Liberal Democrats	Carol Shaw	2,557	53.8	
Liberal Democrats	Barry Cheese	1,999	42.0	
Liberal Democrats	Mark Cummins	1,815	38.2	
Conservative	Richard Grossman	1,379	29.0	
Labour	Stephen Chamberlain	1,367	28.7	
Labour	Ali Awes	1,219	25.6	
Conservative	Richard Holloway	1,218	25.6	
Conservative	Faezeh Faiz	1,114	23.4	
Labour	Eleanor Southwood	1,015	21.3	
Green	Rosie Leventon	438	9.2	
Green	Simon Collins	412	8.7	
Green	Dalibor Ojkic	215	4.5	
Turnout		4,791	52	+12
Liberal Democrats hold		Swing		
Liberal Democrats hold		Swing		
Liberal Democrats hold		Swing		

=== Dollis Hill ===
Dollis Hill (3 seats)
Party	Candidate	Votes	%	±%
Liberal Democrats	Jack Beck	1,914	43.7	
Liberal Democrats	Alec Castle	1,885	43.0	
Liberal Democrats	Javaid Ashraf	1,833	41.9	
Labour	Lena Ahmed	1,806	41.2	
Labour	Nadhim Ahmed	1,792	40.9	
Labour	Ralph Fox	1,705	38.9	
Conservative	Jane Sayers	875	20.0	
Conservative	Manubhai Makwana	804	18.4	
Conservative	Zamira Ruspi	649	14.8	
Green	Sally Ibbotson	203	4.6	
Green	Ahmed Bakir	179	4.1	
Green	Adlen Biloum	161	3.7	
Turnout		4,443	52	+13
Liberal Democrats gain from Labour		Swing		
Liberal Democrats hold		Swing		
Liberal Democrats gain from Labour		Swing		

=== Dudden Hill ===
Dudden Hill (3 seats)
Party	Candidate	Votes	%	±%
Labour	Mohammad Choudry	2,281	46.9	
Liberal Democrats	David Clues	2,094	43.1	
Labour	Krupesh Hirani	1,844	37.9	
Liberal Democrats	Andrew Rimmer	1,794	36.9	
Liberal Democrats	Chunilal Hirani	1,790	36.8	
Labour	Aisha Benn	1,740	35.8	
Conservative	Theresa Baker	779	16.0	
Conservative	Sylvia Drab	640	13.2	
Conservative	Jennifer Brown	581	11.9	
Green	Clare Homer	409	8.4	
Green	Timothy Hoy	286	5.9	
Green	Miles Litvinoff	206	4.2	
Turnout		4,935	51	+13
Labour gain from Liberal Democrats		Swing		
Liberal Democrats hold		Swing		
Labour gain from Liberal Democrats		Swing		

=== Fryent ===
Fryent (3 seats)
Party	Candidate	Votes	%	±%
Labour	George Crane	2,718	54.9	
Labour	James Moher	2,556	51.6	
Labour	Ruth Moher	2,446	49.4	
Conservative	Jane McClay	1,454	29.4	
Conservative	Kanta Pindoria	1,429	28.9	
Conservative	Jack Sayers	1,299	26.2	
Liberal Democrats	Michael Cox	879	17.8	
Liberal Democrats	James Dunne	783	15.8	
Liberal Democrats	Ayaz Khan	758	15.3	
Green	Manish Patel	332	6.7	
Green	Irfan Mirza	297	6.0	
Green	Asya Hristova	220	4.4	
BNP	Richard Blackmore	163	3.3	
Turnout		4,966	54	+13
Labour hold		Swing		
Labour hold		Swing		
Labour hold		Swing		

=== Harlesden ===
Harlesden (3 seats)
Party	Candidate	Votes	%	±%
Labour	Lincoln Beswick	3,156	65.9	
Labour	Janice Long	2,937	61.3	
Labour	Helga Gladbaum	2,694	56.2	
Liberal Democrats	Shareena Bashir	1,438	30.0	
Liberal Democrats	Thomas Smith	1,213	25.3	
Liberal Democrats	Abdillahi Mohamed	1,165	24.3	
Conservative	Sadatu Eniola	453	9.5	
Conservative	Harry Quainoo	373	7.8	
Green	Philip Holley	346	7.2	
Conservative	Sibongile Sesay	312	6.5	
Green	Simon Erskine	296	6.2	
Green	Karis Loughrey	262	5.5	
Turnout		4,827	49	+22
Labour hold		Swing		
Labour hold		Swing		
Labour hold		Swing		

=== Kensal Green ===
Kensal Green (3 seats)
Party	Candidate	Votes	%	±%
Labour	Claudia Hector	2,172	46.2	
Labour	James Powney	2,064	43.9	
Labour	Bobby Thomas	1,782	37.9	
Liberal Democrats	Deborah Sutherland	1,724	36.6	
Liberal Democrats	Nikita Alatortsev	1,601	34.0	
Liberal Democrats	Robin Pagnamenta	1,570	33.4	
Conservative	Nana Green	760	16.1	
Green	Beverley Finlay	653	13.9	
Conservative	Joan Padro	569	12.1	
Conservative	Peter Osuhon	516	11.0	
Green	Gareth Moors	466	9.9	
Independent	Bertha Joseph	450	9.6	
Green	Maxwell Scott-Slade	346	7.4	
Turnout		4,745	52	+22
Labour hold		Swing		
Labour hold		Swing		
Labour hold		Swing		

=== Kenton ===
Kenton (3 seats)
Party	Candidate	Votes	%	±%
Conservative	Bhikubhai Patel	2,805	45.7	
Conservative	Reginald Colwill	2,667	43.4	
Conservative	Arthur Steel	2,333	38.0	
Labour	John Daly	2,218	36.1	
Labour	Ruby Nerva	1,832	29.8	
Labour	Dennis Risby	1,799	29.3	
Liberal Democrats	Felicity Dunn	1,013	16.5	
Liberal Democrats	Hugh Lawson-Tancred	782	12.7	
Liberal Democrats	Riad Siddiqi	630	10.3	
Green	Alan Mathison	287	4.7	
Green	Lawrence Card	265	4.3	
Green	Eileen Mays	230	3.7	
Turnout		6,144	65	+25
Conservative hold		Swing		
Conservative hold		Swing		
Conservative hold		Swing		

=== Kilburn ===
Kilburn (3 seats)
Party	Candidate	Votes	%	±%
Labour	Mary Arnold	3,235	55.6	
Labour	Benjamin Ogunro	2,560	44.0	
Labour	Temitayo Oladapo	2,303	39.6	
Liberal Democrats	Anthony Dunn	2,134	36.7	
Liberal Democrats	Wystan Palm	1,722	29.6	
Liberal Democrats	John Stylianou	1,463	25.2	
Conservative	Benet Brandeth	1,027	17.7	
Conservative	Evelina Balicka	916	15.8	
Conservative	Jeff Amarfio	855	14.7	
Green	John McCooke	840	14.4	
Green	Peter Murry	514	8.8	
Turnout		5,843	52	+21
Labour gain from Liberal Democrats		Swing		
Labour hold		Swing		
Labour gain from Liberal Democrats		Swing		

=== Mapesbury ===
Mapesbury (3 seats)
Party	Candidate	Votes	%	±%
Liberal Democrats	Hayley Matthews	2,193	43.9	
Liberal Democrats	Christopher Leaman	2,005	40.1	
Liberal Democrats	Sami Hashmi	1,881	37.6	
Labour	Christine Allen	1,773	35.5	
Labour	Angela Griggs	1,631	32.6	
Labour	Arshad Griggs	1,594	31.9	
Conservative	William McGowan	1,066	21.3	
Conservative	Mohammed Salim	920	18.4	
Conservative	Sudha Kavia	841	16.8	
Green	Lia Evans	660	13.2	
Green	Jonathan Wharton	485	9.7	
Green	Timothy Storer	480	9.6	
Turnout		5,056	50	+14
Liberal Democrats hold		Swing		
Liberal Democrats hold		Swing		
Liberal Democrats hold		Swing		

=== Northwick Park ===
Northwick Park (3 seats)
Party	Candidate	Votes	%	±%
Conservative	Edward Baker	2,154	42.7	
Conservative	Harihar Patel	2,130	42.2	
Labour	Margaret McLennan	2,063	40.9	
Conservative	John Detre	1,981	39.3	
Labour	Debjani Sengupta	1,919	38.1	
Labour	Olanrewaju Adebola	1,909	37.9	
Liberal Democrats	Dinesh Shah	1,078	21.4	
Liberal Democrats	Esther Foreman	1,071	21.2	
Liberal Democrats	Vivienne Williamson	911	18.1	
Green	Kirsten Armit	330	6.5	
Green	Cathal Griffin	265	5.3	
Green	Michael Gubbins	253	5.0	
Turnout		5,071	53	+18
Conservative hold		Swing		
Conservative hold		Swing		
Labour gain from Conservative		Swing		

=== Preston ===
Preston (3 seats)
Party	Candidate	Votes	%	±%
Labour	Patricia Harrison	2,633	49.3	
Conservative	Harshadbhai Patel	2,385	44.7	
Labour	Jean Hossain	2,291	42.9	
Labour	Thambimuthu Selvaratnam	2,216	41.5	
Conservative	Alan Mendoza	1,940	36.3	
Conservative	Milan Kamdar	1,787	33.5	
Liberal Democrats	Charles Brand	1,075	20.1	
Liberal Democrats	Donald MacArthur	833	15.6	
Liberal Democrats	Farhat Khan	800	15.0	
Green	Alexis Alexandrou	387	7.2	
Green	Kenan Faikov	188	3.5	
Green	Raidi Shamon	176	3.3	
Turnout		5,375	51	+14
Labour gain from Conservative		Swing		
Conservative hold		Swing		
Labour gain from Conservative		Swing		

=== Queens Park ===
Queens Park (3 seats)
Party	Candidate	Votes	%	±%
Liberal Democrats	Simon Green	2,239	40.2	
Labour	James Denselow	2,075	37.2	
Labour	Michael Adeyeye	2,022	36.3	
Labour	Michael Lyon	1,960	35.2	
Liberal Democrats	Emily Tancred	1,925	34.5	
Liberal Democrats	William Motley	1,724	30.9	
Conservative	Karina Dostalova	1,328	23.8	
Conservative	Gurmaj Dhillon	1,292	23.2	
Conservative	Florence Keelson-Anfu	1,164	20.9	
Green	Alexandra Hamilton-Freed	691	12.4	
Green	Emma Watson	529	9.5	
Green	Isobel Hurt	476	8.5	
Turnout		5,631	56	+18
Liberal Democrats hold		Swing		
Labour gain from Liberal Democrats		Swing		
Labour gain from Liberal Democrats		Swing		

=== Queensbury ===
Queensbury (3 seats)
Party	Candidate	Votes	%	±%
Labour	Rameshchandra Patel	3,188	52.3	
Labour	Sandra Kabir	2,947	48.3	
Labour	Kanapathipillai Naheerathan	2,713	44.5	
Conservative	Kanta Mistry	2,710	44.4	
Conservative	Darren Pullenger	1,785	29.3	
Conservative	Ali Mosawi	1,742	28.6	
Liberal Democrats	Diana Ayres	1,127	18.5	
Liberal Democrats	Devan Shah	920	15.1	
Liberal Democrats	John Lewis	916	15.0	
Green	Michael Freestone	388	6.4	
Green	Thivendaram Balaraman	341	5.6	
Green	Selvarani Balaraman	309	5.1	
Turnout		6,153	55	+10
Labour gain from Conservative		Swing		
Labour gain from Conservative		Swing		
Labour gain from Conservative		Swing		

=== Stonebridge ===
Stonebridge (3 seats)
Party	Candidate	Votes	%	±%
Labour	Ann John	3,284	64.6	
Labour	Columbus Moloney	3,039	59.8	
Labour	Zaffar Van Kalwala	2,832	55.7	
Liberal Democrats	Abdi Aweis	1,410	27.7	
Liberal Democrats	Alison Hopkins	1,374	27.0	
Liberal Democrats	Derek Jackson	1,340	26.4	
Conservative	Ayodele Lana	460	9.0	
Conservative	Christie Fernandes	443	8.7	
Conservative	Uma Fernandes	425	8.4	
Green	Adrian Bennett	342	6.7	
Green	Michael O'Brien	214	4.2	
Green	Cecilia Livinoff	146	2.9	
Turnout		5,144	51	+23
Labour hold		Swing		
Labour hold		Swing		
Labour hold		Swing		

=== Sudbury ===
Sudbury (3 seats)
Party	Candidate	Votes	%	±%
Liberal Democrats	Paul Lorber	2,490	48.1	
Labour	Mary Daly	2,299	44.4	
Liberal Democrats	Chandubhai Patel	2,289	44.2	
Labour	Syed Alam	2,114	40.9	
Labour	Rizwana Ali	2,094	40.5	
Liberal Democrats	Robert Wharton	1,945	37.6	
Conservative	Madhuri Davda	1,006	19.4	
Conservative	Rizwan Govindji	848	16.4	
Conservative	Aroon Rana	832	16.1	
Green	Balakrishnasharma Srikanthan	260	5.0	
Green	Mohamed Bennani	201	3.9	
Green	Subashini Srikanthan	184	3.6	
Turnout		5,211	50	+11
Liberal Democrats hold		Swing		
Labour gain from Liberal Democrats		Swing		
Liberal Democrats hold		Swing		

=== Tokyngton ===
Tokyngton (3 seats)
Party	Candidate	Votes	%	±%
Labour	Mohammed Butt	2,725	51.0	
Labour	Joyce Bacchus	2,615	48.9	
Labour	Ketan Sheth	2,478	46.4	
Liberal Democrats	Peter Corcoran	2,019	37.8	
Liberal Democrats	Jyotshna Patel	1,824	34.1	
Liberal Democrats	Fabiola Marini	1,672	31.3	
Conservative	Jaydutt Desai	994	18.6	
Conservative	Jahan Mahmoodi	726	13.6	
Conservative	John Warren	676	12.6	
Green	Khalid Akram	265	5.0	
Green	Giovanna Dunmall	137	2.6	
Green	Pavlin Pandev	123	2.3	
Turnout		5,393	53	+6
Labour hold		Swing		
Labour gain from Liberal Democrats		Swing		
Labour hold		Swing		

=== Welsh Harp ===
Welsh Harp (3 seats)
Party	Candidate	Votes	%	±%
Labour	Dhirajlal Kataria	2,123	45.5	
Labour	Roxanne Mashari	2,114	45.3	
Labour	Harbhajan Singh	2,100	45.0	
Liberal Democrats	Bedri Hashani	1,507	32.3	
Liberal Democrats	Richard Sisson	1,501	32.2	
Liberal Democrats	Mohammed Khan	1,487	31.9	
Conservative	Francis Eniola	1,039	22.3	
Conservative	Samer Ahmedali	959	20.5	
Conservative	Mohammed Al Ghoul	940	20.1	
Green	Shahrar Ali	430	9.2	
Green	Laura Rudner	359	7.7	
Green	Emesta Karnilajevaite	235	5.0	
Turnout		4,731	51	+11
Labour hold		Swing		
Labour hold		Swing		
Labour hold		Swing		

=== Wembley Central ===
Wembley Central (3 seats)
Party	Candidate	Votes	%	±%
Labour	Jayesh Mistry	2,649	50.0	
Labour	Emad Al-Ebadi	2,352	44.4	
Labour	Wilhelmina Murry	2,277	43.0	
Liberal Democrats	Valerie Brown	2,122	40.0	
Liberal Democrats	Daniel Bessong	1,977	37.3	
Liberal Democrats	Afifa Pervez	1,917	36.2	
Conservative	Shaheen Butt	1,119	21.1	
Conservative	Ratna Kamdar	1,092	20.6	
Conservative	Miranda Colwill	963	18.2	
Green	Rodney Freed	210	4.0	
Green	Solomon Agbonifo-Ezomo	174	3.3	
Green	Maya Sendall	144	2.7	
Turnout		5,335	50	+4
Labour gain from Liberal Democrats		Swing		
Labour gain from Liberal Democrats		Swing		
Labour gain from Liberal Democrats		Swing		

=== Willesden Green ===
Willesden Green (3 seats)
Party	Candidate	Votes	%	±%
Liberal Democrats	Ann Hunter	1,860	44.3	
Labour	Lesley Jones	1,808	43.0	
Liberal Democrats	Gavin Sneddon	1,753	41.7	
Liberal Democrats	Mohammad Anwar	1,698	40.4	
Labour	Abdul Sattar-Butt	1,629	38.8	
Labour	Anthony Ethapemi	1,499	35.7	
Conservative	Hagar Cliff	499	11.9	
Green	Thomas Harrison	454	10.8	
Conservative	Eileen Hillman	447	10.6	
Green	Simone Aspis	414	9.9	
Conservative	Leonard Hillman	398	9.5	
Green	Brian Orr	360	8.6	
Turnout		4,243	47	+14
Liberal Democrats hold		Swing		
Labour hold		Swing		
Liberal Democrats hold		Swing		
