= 2018 Brent London Borough Council election =

Election held for Brent London Borough Council

2018 Brent Borough Council election
- 3 May 2018

All 63 seats to Brent London Borough Council 32 seats needed for a majority

	First party	Second party
Party	Labour	Conservative
Last election	56 seats, 46.8%	6 seats, 20.6%
Seats won	60	3
Seat change	▲4	▼3
Popular vote	48,189	18,809
Percentage	57.6%	22.5%
Swing	▲10.8%	▲1.9%
- Map of the results of the 2018 Brent London Borough Council election. Labour in red and Conservatives in blue.
Council control before election
Labour
Council control after election
Labour

The 2018 Brent London Borough Council election took place on 3 May 2018 to elect members of Brent London Borough Council in England. This was on the same day as other local elections.

== Results summary ==
Brent local election result 2018
Party	Seats	Gains	Losses	Net gain/loss	Seats %	Votes %	Votes	+/−
Labour	60			+4	95.0	57.6	48,189	+10.8
Conservative	3			-3	5.0	22.5	18,809	+1.9
Liberal Democrats	0			-1	0.0	12.6	10,562	-5.0
Green	0			0	0.0	5.6	4,660	-5.2
Women's Equality	0			0	0.0	0.7	626	New
Independent	0			0	0.0	0.5	383	+0.2
UKIP	0			0	0.0	0.3	234	-1.5
Duma Polska	0			0	0.0	0.3	217	New

== Results by ward ==
=== Alperton ===
Alperton
Party	Candidate	Votes	%	±%
Labour Co-op	Bhagwanji Chohan	3,185	57.3	+11.5
Labour Co-op	James Allie	3,174	57.1	+10.0
Labour Co-op	Trupti Sangani	2,961	53.3	+7.4
Conservative	Vikas Patel	1,337	24.1	+14.1
Conservative	George Fordjour	1,162	20.9	+11.9
Conservative	Shamim Chowdhury	1,026	18.5	+6.3
Liberal Democrats	Daniel Brown	582	10.5	−23.1
Green	Andrew Linnie	577	10.4	+3.9
Liberal Democrats	David Johnson	500	9.0	−24.1
Liberal Democrats	James Kerr	362	6.5	−24.3
Turnout		5,557	46.83	
Labour Co-op hold		Swing		
Labour Co-op hold		Swing		
Labour Co-op hold		Swing		

=== Barnhill ===
Barnhill
Party	Candidate	Votes	%	±%
Labour	Michael Pavey	2,411	61.3	+7.6
Labour	Shafique Choudhary	2,408	61.2	+6.9
Labour	Sarah-Louise Marquis	2,403	61.1	+5.6
Conservative	Ghanshyam Boricha	950	24.1	−3.5
Conservative	Valerie Trott	947	24.1	−2.5
Conservative	Smita Mehta	946	24.0	−0.6
Liberal Democrats	Ekaterina Knight	290	7.4	−2.1
Liberal Democrats	George Morrow	277	7.0	+0.7
Liberal Democrats	Vivienne Williamson	271	6.9	+2.2
Independent	Elcena Jeffers	126	3.2	−0.6
Turnout		3,934	34.20	
Labour hold		Swing		
Labour hold		Swing		
Labour hold		Swing		

=== Brondesbury Park ===
Brondesbury Park
Party	Candidate	Votes	%	±%
Labour	Kieron Gill	1,674	45.7	+15.5
Labour	Erica Gbajumo	1,660	45.4	+16.9
Labour	Tony Ethapemi	1,636	44.7	+16.8
Conservative	Carol Shaw	1,567	42.8	−6.9
Conservative	John Warren	1,324	36.2	+2.2
Conservative	Bertha Joseph	1,261	34.5	−0.8
Liberal Democrats	Tilly McAuliffe	439	12.0	−7.1
Liberal Democrats	John Duggan	420	11.5	−2.2
Liberal Democrats	Edward Round	320	8.7	−3.1
Turnout		3,660	40.93	
Labour gain from Conservative		Swing	+14.7	
Labour gain from Conservative		Swing		
Labour gain from Conservative		Swing		

=== Dollis Hill ===
Dollis Hill
Party	Candidate	Votes	%	±%
Labour	Parvez Ahmed	2,195	55.4	+11.6
Labour	Liz Dixon	2,131	53.8	+13.9
Labour	Arshad Mahmood	2,100	53.0	+10.4
Liberal Democrats	Alison Hopkins	1,355	34.2	−4.4
Liberal Democrats	Naim Hasani	913	23.0	−7.0
Liberal Democrats	Afifa Pervez	857	21.6	−8.3
Conservative	Richard Lacey	429	10.8	−2.9
Conservative	Mark Oates	354	8.9	−2.4
Conservative	Harry Quainoo	342	8.6	−1.4
Duma Polska	Robert Nowak	67	1.7	N/A
Duma Polska	Robert Gajdzinski	65	1.6	N/A
Duma Polska	Anna Paskiewicz	63	1.6	N/A
Turnout		3,963	43.07	
Labour hold		Swing		
Labour hold		Swing		
Labour hold		Swing		

=== Dudden Hill ===
Dudden Hill
Party	Candidate	Votes	%	±%
Labour	Aslam Choudry	2,214	58.9	+10.0
Labour	Janice Long	2,170	57.7	+12.5
Labour	Krupesh Hirani	2,053	54.6	+10.5
Conservative	Tobias Batkin	572	15.2	+4.0
Liberal Democrats	Mark Cummins	507	13.5	−12.9
Conservative	Tarul Islam	462	12.3	+3.0
Conservative	Ramesh Vara	462	12.3	+3.1
Liberal Democrats	Robert Goodsell	400	10.6	−12.3
Green	Phil Ram	387	10.3	−2.5
Liberal Democrats	John Hellett	359	9.5	−13.3
Duma Polska	Marcin Caban	150	4.0	N/A
Duma Polska	Iwona Dankowska	132	3.5	N/A
Duma Polska	Agnieszka Zywica	130	3.5	N/A
Independent	Mohan Gupta	85	2.3	N/A
Turnout		3,761	37.51	
Labour hold		Swing		
Labour hold		Swing		
Labour hold		Swing		

=== Fryent ===
Fryent
Party	Candidate	Votes	%	±%
Labour	George Crane	2,102	64.7	+3.2
Labour	Vincent Lo	1,989	61.2	+1.2
Labour	Shama Tatler	1,971	60.7	+9.3
Conservative	Ramila Mistry	1,071	33.0	+5.4
Conservative	Gerald Soames	936	28.8	+3.4
Conservative	Agnieszka Lecka-Wuni	889	27.4	+5.0
Turnout		3,248	34.47	
Labour hold		Swing		
Labour hold		Swing		
Labour hold		Swing		

=== Harlesden ===
Harlesden
Party	Candidate	Votes	%	±%
Labour	Lloyd McLeish	2,425	76.5	+11.4
Labour	Joshua Murray	2,310	72.9	+3.6
Labour	Mili Patel	2,156	68.1	+3.4
Liberal Democrats	Sarah Latham	397	12.5	+0.1
Conservative	Diana Newhall	312	9.8	+1.0
Liberal Democrats	Peter Scott	310	9.8	−0.2
Conservative	Hazel Al-Jawad	277	8.7	±0.0
Conservative	Martha Ocampo	252	8.0	±0.0
Turnout		3,168	30.32	
Labour hold		Swing		
Labour hold		Swing		
Labour hold		Swing		

=== Kensal Green ===
Kensal Green
Party	Candidate	Votes	%	±%
Labour	Jumbo Chan	2,258	67.8	+9.1
Labour	Claudia Hector	2,179	65.4	+6.3
Labour	Matt Kelcher	1,998	60.0	+3.8
Green	Samuel Hopkins	427	12.8	−7.4
Liberal Democrats	Daisy Newton Dunn	416	12.5	−4.1
Conservative	Sophia Moore	393	11.8	−1.0
Conservative	Stephen Hoffman	389	11.7	−0.7
Liberal Democrats	Deborah Sutherland	370	11.1	−5.2
Liberal Democrats	Isabella Thomas	360	10.8	−4.8
Conservative	Khatheja Asif	348	10.4	−0.3
UKIP	Frances Flanagan	118	3.5	N/A
Turnout		3,331	34.54	
Labour hold		Swing		
Labour hold		Swing		
Labour hold		Swing		

=== Kenton ===
Kenton
Party	Candidate	Votes	%	±%
Conservative	Suresh Kansagra	1,884	51.0	−2.2
Conservative	Reg Colwill	1,795	48.6	−4.5
Conservative	Michael Maurice	1,699	46.0	−3.4
Labour	Rajan Seelan	1,454	39.4	+5.7
Labour	Colum Moloney	1,345	36.4	+5.6
Labour	Nyela Reid	1,244	33.7	+5.7
Liberal Democrats	Aruna Nair	346	9.4	+2.9
Green	Shonte Miller-Howe	256	6.9	−3.4
Liberal Democrats	James Thomas	213	5.8	+1.3
Liberal Democrats	Duncan Wharton	152	4.1	+0.4
Turnout		3,693	39.84	
Conservative hold		Swing		
Conservative hold		Swing		
Conservative hold		Swing		

=== Kilburn ===
Kilburn
Party	Candidate	Votes	%	±%
Labour	Rita Conneely	2,613	65.7	+6.9
Labour	Abdirazak Abdi	2,431	61.1	+1.9
Labour	Faduma Hassan	2,387	60.0	+6.2
Liberal Democrats	Mireille Levy	631	15.9	+3.0
Liberal Democrats	Charles Brand	611	15.4	+5.5
Conservative	Edward Moores	545	13.7	−2.2
Conservative	Louie Brockbank	527	13.3	−0.9
Conservative	Monica Roberts	503	12.6	−1.4
Liberal Democrats	Derick Rethans	456	11.5	+2.7
Independent	John Duffy	412	10.4	−48.8
Turnout		3,977	33.48	
Labour hold		Swing		
Labour hold		Swing		
Labour hold		Swing		

=== Mapesbury ===
Mapesbury
Party	Candidate	Votes	%	±%
Labour	Lia Colacicco	2,129	55.5	+15.7
Labour	Tariq Dar	1,971	51.2	+15.9
Labour	Ahmad Shahzad	1,750	45.5	+9.2
Conservative	George Currie	615	16.0	+3.4
Liberal Democrats	Alyssa Gilbert	610	15.9	−19.8
Conservative	Poppy Simister	602	15.7	+3.9
Liberal Democrats	Clayton Crabtree	580	15.1	−18.4
Liberal Democrats	Anthony Dunn	573	14.9	−15.4
Conservative	James Newhall	559	14.5	+2.9
Green	Scott Bartle	499	13.9	−8.1
Green	Lenia Evans	463	12.0	N/A
Green	Sophie Ogier	439	11.4	N/A
Turnout		3863	37.27	
Labour hold		Swing		
Labour hold		Swing		
Labour gain from Liberal Democrats		Swing		

=== Northwick Park ===
Northwick Park
Party	Candidate	Votes	%	±%
Labour	Keith Perrin	2,055	57.5	+11.3
Labour	Robert Johnson	1,862	52.1	+8.5
Labour	Margaret McLennan	1,855	51.9	+7.8
Conservative	Ekta Gohl	1,244	34.8	−8.3
Conservative	Sushil Dokwal	1,161	32.5	−9.8
Conservative	Nilesh Sadhu	1,155	32.3	−8.4
Green	Simon Rebbitt	383	10.7	+3.5
Turnout		3,574	36.53	
Labour hold		Swing		
Labour hold		Swing		
Labour hold		Swing		

=== Preston ===
Preston
Party	Candidate	Votes	%	±%
Labour	Anita Thakkar	2,423	57.1	+12.8
Labour	Daniel Kennelly	2,320	54.7	+11.5
Labour	Ihtesham Afzal	2,135	50.3	+10.2
Conservative	Hema Mistry	1,541	36.3	−0.6
Conservative	Felix Di Netimah	1,364	32.1	−2.5
Conservative	Badrul Haque	1,261	29.7	−4.8
Liberal Democrats	Gillian Conduit	341	8.0	+1.3
Liberal Democrats	Adrian Smith	285	6.7	+0.4
Liberal Democrats	Mohammed Shaikh	258	6.1	+0.6
Independent	Jeffrey Deen	172	4.1	−4.8
Turnout		4,244	37.93	
Labour hold		Swing		
Labour hold		Swing		
Labour hold		Swing		

=== Queensbury ===
Queensbury
Party	Candidate	Votes	%	±%
Labour	Ramesh Patel	2,211	47.3	+2.8
Labour	Sandra Kabir	2,148	46.0	−0.5
Labour	Kana Naheerathan	2,100	45.0	+1.4
Conservative	Kanta Mistry	1,902	40.7	−0.6
Conservative	Jayanti Patel	1,828	39.1	+3.0
Conservative	Mick Iqbal	1,530	32.8	−3.9
Liberal Democrats	John Lewis	359	7.7	+3.1
Liberal Democrats	Peggy Cruickshank	323	6.9	+3.2
Green	Nesrin Ahmet	318	6.8	−0.5
Liberal Democrats	Larry Ngan	290	6.2	+0.7
Turnout		4,671	39.75	
Labour hold		Swing		
Labour hold		Swing		
Labour hold		Swing		

=== Queens Park ===
Queens Park
Party	Candidate	Votes	%	±%
Labour	Neil Nerva	1,862	45.9	−1.2
Labour	James Denselow	1,835	45.2	−4.1
Labour	Eleanor Southwood	1,766	43.5	−1.8
Liberal Democrats	Virginia Bonham Carter	1,005	24.8	+4.2
Liberal Democrats	Hussain Khan	767	18.9	+3.2
Liberal Democrats	Deborah Unger	763	18.8	+4.0
Conservative	Chris Alley	700	17.3	−5.1
Women's Equality	Emma Ko	626	15.4	N/A
Conservative	Ellie Phipps	593	14.6	−5.6
Conservative	Nick Vose	519	12.8	−5.0
Green	Poppy Stockbridge	507	12.5	−8.9
Green	John Mansook	373	9.2	N/A
Green	Lawrence McNally	336	8.3	N/A
Turnout		4,057	39.30	
Labour hold		Swing		
Labour hold		Swing		
Labour hold		Swing		

=== Stonebridge ===
Stonebridge
Party	Candidate	Votes	%	±%
Labour	Abdi Aden	3,177	83.9	+8.9
Labour	Promise Knight	2,995	79.1	+11.2
Labour	Ernest Ezeajughi	2,945	77.8	+6.1
Conservative	Theresa Baker	428	11.3	+1.9
Conservative	Alison Maurice	382	10.1	+1.1
Conservative	Joan Padro	317	8.4	+1.2
Turnout		3,785	31.04	
Labour hold		Swing		
Labour hold		Swing		
Labour hold		Swing		

=== Sudbury ===
Sudbury
Party	Candidate	Votes	%	±%
Labour	Mary Daly	2,304	49.4	+1.8
Labour	Saqib Butt	2,131	45.7	+2.2
Labour	Thomas Stephens	2,015	43.2	+0.9
Liberal Democrats	Paul Lorber	1,793	38.5	−0.1
Liberal Democrats	Kalpana Rawai	1,522	32.7	−0.8
Liberal Democrats	Selina Rawal	1,386	29.7	−2.5
Conservative	Tarun Kapadia	592	12.7	−0.1
Conservative	Ashok Patel	497	10.7	−0.1
Conservative	Savinder Oberai	460	9.9	+0.4
Green	Rose Osborn	249	5.3	−1.9
Turnout		4,660	44.08	
Labour hold		Swing		
Labour hold		Swing		
Labour hold		Swing		

=== Tokyngton ===
Tokyngton
Party	Candidate	Votes	%	±%
Labour	Muhammed Butt	2,651	63.7	+3.7
Labour	Ketan Sheth	2,597	62.4	+5.2
Labour	Orleen Hylton	2,522	60.6	+7.5
Conservative	Kelvin Bageire	949	22.8	+1.0
Conservative	Jonathan Pollock	906	21.8	+3.1
Conservative	Dan Russell	838	20.1	+4.8
Green	Martin Francis	450	10.8	−0.5
Liberal Democrats	Karen Brown	415	10.0	−3.4
Liberal Democrats	Abid Khalid	310	7.4	−3.4
Turnout		4,164	29.86	
Labour hold		Swing		
Labour hold		Swing		
Labour hold		Swing		

=== Welsh Harp ===
Welsh Harp
Party	Candidate	Votes	%	±%
Labour	Amer Agha	1,953	61.2	+6.4
Labour	Roxanne Mashari	1,918	60.1	+5.3
Labour	Harbi Farah	1,846	57.8	+8.3
Conservative	Steven Binks	730	22.9	+2.3
Conservative	Andy Sharma	712	22.3	+4.3
Conservative	Edward Young	644	20.2	+3.8
Liberal Democrats	Diana Ayres	282	8.8	−1.2
Liberal Democrats	Freda Raingold	212	6.6	±0.0
Liberal Democrats	Richard Sisson	182	5.7	−0.9
UKIP	Andrew Beckman	116	3.6	−9.8
UKIP	Janice North	113	3.5	N/A
UKIP	Robin Yewdall	61	1.9	N/A
Turnout		3,193	33.66	
Labour hold		Swing		
Labour hold		Swing		
Labour hold		Swing		

=== Wembley Central ===
Wembley Central
Party	Candidate	Votes	%	±%
Labour	Krupa Sheth	3,210	64.9	+13.3
Labour	Wilhelmina Murray	3,187	64.4	+18.3
Labour	Luke Patterson	2,996	60.6	+20.6
Conservative	George Fergusson	768	15.5	+3.3
Conservative	Adin Brewis	755	15.3	+4.4
Conservative	Lacey Butcher	734	14.8	+5.5
Liberal Democrats	Jyotshna Patel	540	10.9	−25.5
Liberal Democrats	Valerie Brown	435	8.8	−23.6
Green	Rohan Patel	318	6.4	−0.1
Liberal Democrats	Robert Wharton	288	5.8	−24.3
Turnout		4,947	42.47	
Labour hold		Swing		
Labour hold		Swing		
Labour hold		Swing		

=== Willesden Green ===
Willesden Green ward elections were put on hold following death of incumbent Labour councillor Lesley Jones. The election was eventually held on 21 June.

Willesden Green
Party	Candidate	Votes	%	±%
Labour	Fleur Donnelly-Jackson	1,683	67.6	+14.7
Labour	Elliot Chappell	1,679	67.4	+17.6
Labour	Tom Miller	1,618	65.0	+20.8
Green	Shaka Lish	289	11.6	−4.6
Conservative	Harry Goodwill	280	11.2	+2.6
Green	Peter Murry	256	10.3	−5.6
Liberal Democrats	Felicity Dunn	254	10.2	−9.3
Green	William Relton	250	10.0	N/A
Conservative	Shahin Chowdury	237	9.5	+1.3
Conservative	Ali Al Jawad	218	8.8	+1.1
Liberal Democrats	Ulla Thiessen	189	7.6	−7.1
Liberal Democrats	Christopher Wheatley	184	7.4	−5.6
Turnout		2,503	25.49	
Labour hold		Swing		
Labour hold		Swing		
Labour hold		Swing		

== 2018–2022 by elections ==
Alperton by-election, 23 January 2020
Party	Candidate	Votes	%	±%
Liberal Democrats	Anton Georgiou	1,699	39.7	▲29.5
Labour	Chetan Harpale	1,304	30.5	▼25.6
Conservative	Harmit Vyas	900	21.0	▼2.5
Green	Andrew Linnie	373	8.7	▼1.4
Majority		395	9.2	N/A
Turnout		4,276	34.0	
Liberal Democrats gain from Labour		Swing	+27.55	

Wembley Central by-election, 23 January 2020
Party	Candidate	Votes	%	±%
Labour	Sonia Shah	1,945	54.5	▼11.8
Conservative	Sai Madabhushi	1,090	30.6	▲14.7
Liberal Democrats	Jyotshna Patel	378	10.6	▲0.6
Green	William Renton	154	4.3	▼2.3
Majority		855	23.9	
Turnout		3,567	27.6	
Labour hold		Swing	-13.25	

Brondesbury Park by-election, 5 May 2021
Party	Candidate	Votes	%	±%
Labour	Gwen Grahl	1,871	46.6	▲0.9
Conservative	Sapna Chadha	1,227	30.6	▼12.2
Green	Sheila Simpson	469	11.7	New
Liberal Democrats	Philip Alexander	448	11.2	▼0.8
Majority		855	16.0	+13.1
Turnout		4,015	27.6	−13.3
Labour hold		Swing	+6.55	
