= Queensbury (Brent ward) =

Electoral ward in Brent, London, England

- Electoral ward for the Brent London Borough Council
- Borough: Brent
- County: Greater London
- Population: 17,189 (2021)
- Major settlements: Queensbury
- Area: 2.309 km²

Current electoral ward
- Created: 1965
- Councillors: 3 (since 2002); 2 (1964-2002)

Queensbury is an electoral ward in the London Borough of Brent. The ward was first used in the 1964 elections. It elects three councillors to Brent London Borough Council.

== Geography ==
The ward is named after the area of Queensbury.

== Councillors ==
Election	Councillors		
2002	Ramesh Patel (Labour)	Bill Dromey (Labour)	Sandra Kabir (Labour)
2006	Kanta Mistry (Conservative)	Robert Dunwell (Conservative)	Atiq Patel (Conservative)
2010	Ramesh Patel (Labour)	Kana Naheerathan (Labour)	Sandra Kabir (Labour)
2014	Ramesh Patel (Labour)	Kana Naheerathan (Labour)	Sandra Kabir (Labour)
2018	Ramesh Patel (Labour)	Kana Naheerathan (Labour)	Sandra Kabir (Labour)
2022	Kanta Mistry (Conservative)	Jayanti Patel (Conservative)	Sandra Kabir (Labour)

== Elections ==
=== 2022 ===
Queensbury (3 seats)
Party	Candidate	Votes	%	±%
Conservative	Kanta Mistry	1,972	47.6	+0.7
Conservative	Jayanti Patel	1,886	45.5	+0.4
Labour	Sandra Kabir*	1,797	43.3	−9.6
Conservative	Manoj Mishra	1,782	43.0	+5.3
Labour	Anita Thakkar*	1,761	42.5	−12.0
Labour	Kana Naheerathan*	1,662	40.1	−11.7
Liberal Democrats	Valerie Brown	330	8.0	0.0
Liberal Democrats	Jeanie Cruickshank	255	6.2	−2.6
Liberal Democrats	Ieva Tomsone	212	5.1	−2.0
Independent	Brian Yauner	117	2.8	New
Turnout		4,146	34.2	−5.6
Registered electors		12,069		
Conservative gain from Labour		Swing	+6.35	
Conservative gain from Labour		Swing	+6.05	
Labour hold		Swing	-7.45	

=== 2018 ===
Queensbury
Party	Candidate	Votes	%	±%
Labour	Ramesh Patel	2,211	54.5	
Labour	Sandra Kabir	2,148	52.9	
Labour	Kana Naheerathan	2,100	51.8	
Conservative	Kanta Mistry	1,902	46.9	
Conservative	Jayanti Patel	1,828	45.1	
Conservative	Mick Iqbal	1,530	37.7	
Liberal Democrats	John Lewis	359	8.8	
Liberal Democrats	Peggy Cruickshank	323	8.0	
Green	Nesrin Ahmet	318	7.8	
Liberal Democrats	Larry Ngan	290	7.1	
Turnout		4,671	39.75	
Labour hold		Swing		
Labour hold		Swing		
Labour hold		Swing		

=== 2014 ===
Queensbury (3 seats)
Party	Candidate	Votes	%	±%
Labour	Sandra Kabir	2,114		
Labour	Ramesh Patel	2,022		
Labour	Kana Naheerathan	1,981		
Conservative	Kanta Mistry	1,877		
Conservative	Snehal Mehta	1,669		
Conservative	Jayanti Patel	1,644		
UKIP	Barry Cameron	421		
Green	Adlen Biloum	332		
Liberal Democrats	Valerie Brown	252		
Liberal Democrats	John Lewis	209		
Liberal Democrats	Peggy Cruickshank	170		
Total votes		12,691	41	-14
Labour hold		Swing		
Labour hold		Swing		
Labour hold		Swing		

=== 2010 ===
Queensbury (3 seats)
Party	Candidate	Votes	%	±%
Labour	Rameshchandra Patel	3,188	52.3	
Labour	Sandra Kabir	2,947	48.3	
Labour	Kanapathipillai Naheerathan	2,713	44.5	
Conservative	Kanta Mistry	2,710	44.4	
Conservative	Darren Pullenger	1,785	29.3	
Conservative	Ali Mosawi	1,742	28.6	
Liberal Democrats	Diana Ayres	1,127	18.5	
Liberal Democrats	Devan Shah	920	15.1	
Liberal Democrats	John Lewis	916	15.0	
Green	Michael Freestone	388	6.4	
Green	Thivendaram Balaraman	341	5.6	
Green	Selvarani Balaraman	309	5.1	
Turnout		6,153	55	+10
Labour gain from Conservative		Swing		
Labour gain from Conservative		Swing		
Labour gain from Conservative		Swing		

=== 2006 ===
Queensbury (3 seats)
Party	Candidate	Votes	%	±%
Conservative	Kanta Mistry	2,169	48.8	
Conservative	Robert Dunwell	2,014		
Conservative	Atiq Malik	1,997		
Labour	Rameshchandra Patel	1,568	35.3	
Labour	Bill Dromey	1,551		
Labour	Sandra Kabir	1,516		
Liberal Democrats	John Lewis	426	9.6	
Liberal Democrats	Frank Raisin	369		
Green	Charles Bennett	284	6.4	
Liberal Democrats	Anthony Spitzel	276		
Turnout		12,170	45	+9
Conservative gain from Labour		Swing		
Conservative gain from Labour		Swing		
Conservative gain from Labour		Swing		

=== 2002 ===
Queensbury (3 seats)
Party	Candidate	Votes	%	±%
Labour	Bill Dromey	1,757		
Labour	Rameshchandra Patel	1,707		
Labour	Sandra Kabir	1,583		
Conservative	Yogesh Joshee	1,069		
Conservative	Kanesh Patel	994		
Conservative	Venilal Vaghela	974		
Liberal Democrats	Jyotshna Patel	333		
Liberal Democrats	Marjorie Bonfield	319		
Liberal Democrats	Vivienne Williamson	303		
Turnout		9,039	36.1	
