= Preston (ward) =

- Electoral ward for the Brent London Borough Council
- Preston ward boundaries since 2022
- Borough: Brent
- County: Greater London
- Population: 12,661 (2021) (Note: 2021 Census data reported for 2022 ward boundaries)
- Electorate: 7,929 (2022)
- Area: 1.792 square kilometres (0.692 sq mi)

Current electoral ward
- Created: 1965
- Councillors: 1965–1968: 3; 1968–1978: 1; 1978–2022: 3; 2022–present: 2
- GSS code: E05013506 (2022–present)

Preston is an electoral ward in the London Borough of Brent. The ward has existed since the creation of the borough on 1 April 1965 and was first used in the 1964 elections. It returns two councillors to Brent London Borough Council. (Note: Between 1965 and 1968 the ward returned three councillors, from 1968 to 1978 the ward returned one councillor and from 1978 to 2022 the ward returned three councillors.)

== Brent council elections since 2022 ==
There was a revision of ward boundaries in Brent in 2022.

=== 2026 election ===
The election took place on 7 May 2026.

2026 Brent London Borough Council election: Preston
Party	Candidate	Votes	%	±%
Conservative	Harshadbhai Patel	1,010	36.2	
Conservative	Michael Maurice	894	32.0	
Green	Kaushik Bhattacharya	807	28.9	
Labour Co-op	Daniel Kennelly*	729	26.1	
Labour Co-op	Orleen Hylton*	656	23.5	
Green	Georgina Vanmali	590	21.1	
Reform	Jeffrey Deen	230	8.2	
Reform	Iosif Borsos	223	8.0	
Independent	Nadia Klok	183	6.6	
Liberal Democrats	Valerie Brown	154	5.5	
Liberal Democrats	Martin Lemon	109	3.9	
Turnout		2,935	37.2	▲2.3
Registered electors		7,877		
Conservative gain from Labour				
Conservative gain from Labour				

=== 2022 election ===
The election took place on 5 May 2022.

2022 Brent London Borough Council election: Preston
Party	Candidate	Votes	%	±%
Labour	Daniel Kennelly	1,532	55.2	
Labour	Orleen Hylton	1,417	51.1	
Conservative	Hema Mistry	941	33.9	
Conservative	Sushil Rapatwar	808	29.1	
Green	David Pearson	191	6.9	
Liberal Democrats	Dominic O'Sullivan	143	5.2	
Liberal Democrats	Robert Goodsell	128	4.6	
Independent	Cristian Stincanu	111	4.0	
Turnout		2,775	34.9	−3.0
Registered electors		7,929		
Labour win (new boundaries)				
Labour win (new boundaries)				

== 2002–2022 Brent council elections ==
Preston ward boundaries from 2002 to 2022

There was a revision of ward boundaries in Brent in 2002.

=== 2018 election ===
The election took place on 3 May 2018.

2018 Brent London Borough Council election: Preston
Party	Candidate	Votes	%	±%
Labour	Anita Thakkar	2,423	57.1	
Labour	Daniel Kennelly	2,320	54.7	
Labour	Ihtesham Afzal	2,135	50.3	
Conservative	Hema Mistry	1,541	36.3	
Conservative	Felix Di Netimah	1,364	32.1	
Conservative	Badrul Haque	1,261	29.7	
Liberal Democrats	Gillian Conduit	341	8.0	
Liberal Democrats	Adrian Smith	285	6.7	
Liberal Democrats	Mohammed Shaikh	258	6.1	
Independent	Jeffrey Deen	172	4.1	
Turnout		4,244	37.93	
Labour hold		Swing		
Labour hold		Swing		
Labour hold		Swing		

=== 2014 election ===
The election took place on 22 May 2014.

2014 Brent London Borough Council election: Preston
Party	Candidate	Votes	%	±%
Labour	Matthew Bradley	1,712		
Labour	Patricia Harrison	1,671		
Labour	Jean Hossain	1,549		
Conservative	Harshadbhai Patel	1,428		
Conservative	Michael Maurice	1,339		
Conservative	Monica Patel	1,334		
UKIP	Jeffrey Deen	345		
Green	May Erskine	317		
Liberal Democrats	Eileen Barker	260		
Liberal Democrats	Jacqueline Bunce-Linsell	245		
Liberal Democrats	David Johnson	211		
TUSC	Paul Summers	148		
Total votes		10,559	36	-15
Labour hold		Swing		
Labour gain from Conservative		Swing		
Labour hold		Swing		

=== 2010 election ===
The election on 6 May 2010 took place on the same day as the United Kingdom general election.

2010 Brent London Borough Council election: Preston
Party	Candidate	Votes	%	±%
Labour	Patricia Harrison	2,633	49.3	
Conservative	Harshadbhai Patel	2,385	44.7	
Labour	Jean Hossain	2,291	42.9	
Labour	Thambimuthu Selvaratnam	2,216	41.5	
Conservative	Alan Mendoza	1,940	36.3	
Conservative	Milan Kamdar	1,787	33.5	
Liberal Democrats	Charles Brand	1,075	20.1	
Liberal Democrats	Donald MacArthur	833	15.6	
Liberal Democrats	Farhat Khan	800	15.0	
Green	Alexis Alexandrou	387	7.2	
Green	Kenan Faikov	188	3.5	
Green	Raidi Shamon	176	3.3	
Turnout		5,375	51	+14
Labour gain from Conservative		Swing		
Conservative hold		Swing		
Labour gain from Conservative		Swing		

=== 2006 election ===
The election took place on 4 May 2006.

2006 Brent London Borough Council election: Preston
Party	Candidate	Votes	%	±%
Conservative	Bob Blackman	2,010	53.8	
Conservative	Alan Mendoza	1,852		
Conservative	Harshadbhai Patel	1,830		
Labour	Mary Daly	1,014	27.1	
Labour	Robina Zakriya	880		
Labour	Karanodakasayi Dasa	850		
Liberal Democrats	Jacqueline Bunce-Linsell	439	11.8	
Liberal Democrats	Vivienne Williamson	372		
Liberal Democrats	Jonathan Pincus	357		
Green	Jonathan Liddell	273	7.3	
Turnout		9,877	37	+3
Conservative hold		Swing		
Conservative hold		Swing		
Conservative hold		Swing		

=== 2002 election ===
The election took place on 2 May 2002.

2002 Brent London Borough Council election: Preston
Party	Candidate	Votes	%	±%
Conservative	Robert Blackman	1,685		
Conservative	Harshadbhai Patel	1,644		
Conservative	Thomas Taylor	1,615		
Labour	Mary Mears	923		
Labour	James Dudley	914		
Labour	John Poole	865		
Liberal Democrats	Jacqueline Bunce-Linsell	255		
Liberal Democrats	Pearl Raisin	246		
Liberal Democrats	Tom Krosing	230		
Turnout		8,377	33.9	
Conservative win (new boundaries)				
Conservative win (new boundaries)				
Conservative win (new boundaries)				

== 1978–2002 Brent council elections ==
=== 1998 election ===
The election took place on 7 May 1998.

1998 Brent London Borough Council election: Preston
Party	Candidate	Votes	%	±%
Conservative	Robert Blackman	1,922		
Conservative	Harshadbhai Patel	1,734		
Conservative	Thomas Taylor	1,731		
Labour	Eileen Macklin	1,019		
Labour	Cyril McGovern	1,014		
Labour	George Macklin	959		
Conservative Independent	Chunilal Chavda	279		
Liberal Democrats	Richard Thomas	260		
Liberal Democrats	Jacqueline Bunce-Linsell	259		
Turnout		9,177	36.0	
Conservative hold				
Conservative hold				
Conservative hold				

=== 1994 election ===
The election took place on 5 May 1994.

1994 Brent London Borough Council election: Preston
Party	Candidate	Votes	%
	Conservative hold		
	Conservative hold		
	Conservative hold		

=== 1990 election ===
The election took place on 3 May 1990.

1990 Brent London Borough Council election: Preston
Party	Candidate	Votes	%
Conservative	Robert Blackman	2,740	69.82
Conservative	Thomas Taylor	2,614	
Conservative	Alan Kemp	2,600	
Labour	Benjamin Rickman	761	19.59
Labour	Ruby Nerva	748	
Labour	Abbas Ally	723	
Liberal Democrats	Valerie Goldberg	412	10.59
Liberal Democrats	Angiola Coath	392	
Registered electors		9,187	
Turnout		3968	43.19
Rejected ballots		9	0.23
Conservative hold			
Conservative hold			
Conservative hold			

=== 1986 election ===
The election took place on 8 May 1986.

=== 1982 election ===
The election took place on 6 May 1982.

=== 1978 election ===
The election took place on 4 May 1978.

== 1968–1978 Brent council elections ==
There was a revision of ward boundaries in Brent in 1968.

=== 1974 election ===
The election took place on 2 May 1974.

=== 1971 election ===
The election took place on 13 May 1971.

=== 1968 election ===
The election took place on 9 May 1968.

== 1964–1968 Brent council elections ==
=== 1964 election ===
The election took place on 7 May 1964.
