= Kingsbury (ward) =

Electoral ward in Brent, London, England

- Electoral ward for the Brent London Borough Council
- Borough: Brent
- County: Greater London
- Population: 11,237 (2021)
- Major settlements: Kingsbury
- Area: 1.260 km²

Current electoral ward
- Created: 2022
- Councillors: 2

Kingsbury is an electoral ward in the London Borough of Brent. The ward was first used in the 2022 elections. It elects two councillors to Brent London Borough Council.

== History ==
A Kingsbury ward was in use from 1964 to 1978.

== Geography ==
The ward is named after the suburb of Kingsbury.

== Councillors ==
Election	Councillors	
2022	Saqib Butt (Labour)	Shama Tatler (Labour)

== Elections ==
=== 2022 Brent London Borough Council election ===
Kingsbury (2 seats)
Party	Candidate	Votes	%	±%
Labour	Saqib Butt*	1,328	53.3	
Labour	Shama Tatler*	1,312	52.7	
Conservative	Sanjana Karnani	782	31.4	
Conservative	Salman Khan	649	26.1	
Green	Maurice Gold	241	9.7	
Liberal Democrats	Michael Brooke	235	9.4	
Liberal Democrats	Larry Ngan	136	5.5	
Turnout		2,491	31.3	N/A
Registered electors		7,921		
Labour win (new seat)				
Labour win (new seat)				
