= Welsh Harp (ward) =

Coordinates: 51.576°N 0.255°W

- Electoral ward for the Brent London Borough Council
- Welsh Harp ward boundaries since 2022
- Borough: Brent
- County: Greater London
- Population: 17,921 (2021) (Note: 2021 Census data reported for 2022 ward boundaries)
- Electorate: 12,417 (2022)
- Area: 3.306 square kilometres (1.276 sq mi)

Current electoral ward
- Created: 2002
- Number of members: 3
- Councillors: Amer Agha; Harbi Farah; Mary Mitchell
- GSS code: E05013513 (2022–present)

Welsh Harp is an electoral ward in the London Borough of Brent. The ward was first used in the 2002 elections. It returns three councillors to Brent London Borough Council.

== List of councillors ==
Seat	Councillor	Took office	Left office	Party	Election
1	Richard Harrod	2002	2006	Labour	2002
2	Mary Farrell	2002	2010	Labour	2002, 2006
3	Harbhajan Singh	2002	2014	Labour	2002, 2006, 2010
1	Francis Eniola	2006	2010	Labour	2006
2	Dhirajlal Kataria	2010	2014	Labour	2010
3	Roxanne Mashari	2010	2022	Labour	2010, 2014, 2018
1	Amer Agha	2014	Incumbent	Labour	2014, 2018, 2022
2	Harbi Farah (Note: Harbi Farah changed parties in 2025)	2014	Incumbent	Labour	2014, 2018, 2022
2	Harbi Farah	2014	Incumbent	Green	2014, 2018, 2022
3	Mary Mitchell (Note: Mary Mitchell changed parties in 2025)	2022	Incumbent	Labour	2022
3	Mary Mitchell	2022	Incumbent	Green	2022

== Brent council elections since 2022 ==
There was a revision of ward boundaries in Brent in 2022.

=== 2022 election ===
The election took place on 5 May 2022.

2022 Brent London Borough Council election: Welsh Harp
Party	Candidate	Votes	%	±%
Labour	Mary Mitchell	1,849	54.8	−5.3
Labour	Amer Agha	1,774	52.6	−8.6
Labour	Harbi Farah	1,700	50.4	−7.4
Conservative	Kieran McCartney-Patel	933	27.7	+4.8
Conservative	Andy Sharma	870	25.8	+3.5
Conservative	Ibrahim Bahadur	782	23.2	+3.0
Green	David Stevens	405	12.0	New
Liberal Democrats	Diana Ayres	383	11.4	+2.6
Liberal Democrats	Freda Raingold	350	10.4	+3.8
Liberal Democrats	Richard Sisson	261	7.7	+2.0
Independent	Elcena Jeffers	92	2.7	New
Turnout		3,373	27.0	−6.7
Registered electors		12,417		
Labour win (new boundaries)				
Labour win (new boundaries)				
Labour win (new boundaries)				

== 2002–2022 Brent council elections ==
Welsh Harp ward boundaries from 2002 to 2022

=== 2018 election ===
The election took place on 3 May 2018.

2018 Brent London Borough Council election: Welsh Harp
Party	Candidate	Votes	%	±%
Labour	Amer Agha	1,953	61.2	
Labour	Roxanne Mashari	1,918	60.1	
Labour	Harbi Farah	1,846	57.8	
Conservative	Steven Binks	730	22.9	
Conservative	Andy Sharma	712	22.3	
Conservative	Edward Young	644	20.2	
Liberal Democrats	Diana Ayres	282	8.8	
Liberal Democrats	Freda Raingold	212	6.6	
Liberal Democrats	Richard Sisson	182	5.7	
UKIP	Andrew Beckman	116	3.6	
UKIP	Janice North	113	3.5	
UKIP	Robin Yewdall	61	1.9	
Turnout		3,193	33.66	
Labour hold		Swing		
Labour hold		Swing		
Labour hold		Swing		

=== 2014 election ===
The election took place on 22 May 2014.

2014 Brent London Borough Council election: Welsh Harp
Party	Candidate	Votes	%	±%
Labour	Roxanne Mashari	1,833		
Labour	Amer Agha	1,831		
Labour	Harbi Farah	1,653		
Conservative	Sylvia Drab	690		
Conservative	Richard Lacey	601		
Conservative	Mohammed Alghoul	547		
UKIP	Syed Hussain	447		
Green	Jafar Hassan	351		
Liberal Democrats	Patricia Ratnayake	334		
Liberal Democrats	Mario Tchiqurina	220		
Liberal Democrats	Ulla Thiessen	219		
Total votes		8,726	35	-16
Labour hold		Swing		
Labour hold		Swing		
Labour hold		Swing		

=== 2010 election ===
The election on 6 May 2010 took place on the same day as the United Kingdom general election.

2010 Brent London Borough Council election: Welsh Harp
Party	Candidate	Votes	%	±%
Labour	Dhirajlal Kataria	2,123	45.5	
Labour	Roxanne Mashari	2,114	45.3	
Labour	Harbhajan Singh	2,100	45.0	
Liberal Democrats	Bedri Hashani	1,507	32.3	
Liberal Democrats	Richard Sisson	1,501	32.2	
Liberal Democrats	Mohammed Khan	1,487	31.9	
Conservative	Francis Eniola	1,039	22.3	
Conservative	Samer Ahmedali	959	20.5	
Conservative	Mohammed Al Ghoul	940	20.1	
Green	Shahrar Ali	430	9.2	
Green	Laura Rudner	359	7.7	
Green	Emesta Karnilajevaite	235	5.0	
Turnout		4,731	51	+11
Labour hold		Swing		
Labour hold		Swing		
Labour hold		Swing		

=== 2006 election ===
The election took place on 4 May 2006.

2006 Brent London Borough Council election: Welsh Harp
Party	Candidate	Votes	%	±%
Labour	Mary Farrell	1,598	45.1	
Labour	Harbhajan Singh	1,500		
Labour	Francis Eniola	1,494		
Conservative	Nigel Fletcher	1,137	32.1	
Conservative	Dineshkumar Mistry	1,116		
Conservative	Richard Lacey	1,090		
Liberal Democrats	Diana Ayres	537	15.2	
Liberal Democrats	Freda Raingold	427		
Liberal Democrats	Ulla Thiessen	345		
Green	Ruth Breznay	268	7.6	
Turnout		9,512	40	+6
Labour hold		Swing		
Labour hold		Swing		
Labour hold		Swing		

=== 2002 election ===
The election took place on 2 May 2002.

2002 Brent London Borough Council election: Welsh Harp
Party	Candidate	Votes	%	±%
Labour	Richard Harrod	1,292		
Labour	Mary Farrell	1,257		
Labour	Harbhajan Singh	1,192		
Conservative	Cormach Moore	1,107		
Conservative	Alan Wall	1,067		
Conservative	Ratilal Shah	1,066		
Liberal Democrats	Christopher Queen	209		
Liberal Democrats	Hermione Raven	186		
Green	Timothy Turner	174		
Liberal Democrats	Deborah Sutherland	163		
UKIP	Alan Samson	76		
Turnout		7,789	33.6	
Labour win (new seat)				
Labour win (new seat)				
Labour win (new seat)				
