= Northwick Park (ward) =

Electoral ward in Brent, London, England

- Electoral ward for the Brent London Borough Council
- Borough: Brent
- County: Greater London
- Population: 12,367 (2021)
- Major settlements: Northwick Park
- Area: 2.705 km²

Current electoral ward
- Created: 2002
- Number of members: 2 (since 2022); 3 (2002-2022)
- Councillors: Keith Perrin; Nisha Vakani

Northwick Park is an electoral ward in the London Borough of Brent. The ward was first used in the 1964 elections. It elects two councillors to Brent London Borough Council.

== Geography ==
The ward is named after the area of Northwick Park.

== Councillors ==
Election	Councillors		
2002	Neil Rands (Conservative)	Harihar Patel (Conservative)	Gerhard Fiegel (Conservative)
2006	Edward Baker (Conservative)	Harihar Patel (Conservative)	John Detre (Conservative)
2010	Edward Baker (Conservative)	Harihar Patel (Conservative)	Margaret McLennan (Labour)
2014	Keith Perrin (Labour)	Joshua Murray (Labour)	Margaret McLennan (Labour)
2018	Keith Perrin (Labour)	Robert Johnson (Labour)	Margaret McLennan (Labour)
2022	Narinder Singh Bajwa (Labour)	Diana Collymore (Labour)	Two seats
2026	Keith Perrin (Green)	Nisha Vakani (Green)	Two seats

== Elections ==
=== 2022 ===
Northwick Park (2 seats)
Party	Candidate	Votes	%	±%
Labour	Narinder Singh Bajwa	1,638	55.8	
Labour	Diana Collymore	1,543	52.6	
Conservative	Harmit Vyas	984	33.5	
Conservative	Mabel Balogun	963	32.8	
Liberal Democrats	Peter Corcoran	254	8.7	
Liberal Democrats	Alessandra Grasso	250	8.5	
Turnout		2,934	33.4	−3.1
Registered electors		8,763		
Labour hold		Swing		
Labour hold		Swing		

=== 2018 ===
Northwick Park
Party	Candidate	Votes	%	±%
Labour	Keith Perrin	2,055	57.5	
Labour	Robert Johnson	1,862	52.1	
Labour	Margaret McLennan	1,855	51.9	
Conservative	Ekta Gohl	1,244	34.8	
Conservative	Sushil Dokwal	1,161	32.5	
Conservative	Nilesh Sadhu	1,155	32.3	
Green	Simon Rebbitt	383	10.7	
Turnout		3,574	36.53	
Labour hold		Swing		
Labour hold		Swing		
Labour hold		Swing		

=== 2014 ===
Northwick Park (3 seats)
Party	Candidate	Votes	%	±%
Labour	Keith Perrin	1,694		
Labour	Margaret McLennan	1,616		
Labour	Joshua Murray	1,599		
Conservative	Kishan Devani	1,579		
Conservative	John Detre	1,550		
Conservative	Harihar Patel	1,493		
Green	Mimi Kaltman	263		
Liberal Democrats	Gillian Conduit	219		
Liberal Democrats	Janet Robb	171		
Liberal Democrats	Freda Raingold	136		
Total votes		10,320	38	-15
Labour gain from Conservative		Swing		
Labour gain from Conservative		Swing		
Labour hold		Swing		

=== 2010 ===
Northwick Park (3 seats)
Party	Candidate	Votes	%	±%
Conservative	Edward Baker	2,154	42.7	
Conservative	Harihar Patel	2,130	42.2	
Labour	Margaret McLennan	2,063	40.9	
Conservative	John Detre	1,981	39.3	
Labour	Debjani Sengupta	1,919	38.1	
Labour	Olanrewaju Adebola	1,909	37.9	
Liberal Democrats	Dinesh Shah	1,078	21.4	
Liberal Democrats	Esther Foreman	1,071	21.2	
Liberal Democrats	Vivienne Williamson	911	18.1	
Green	Kirsten Armit	330	6.5	
Green	Cathal Griffin	265	5.3	
Green	Michael Gubbins	253	5.0	
Turnout		5,071	53	+18
Conservative hold		Swing		
Conservative hold		Swing		
Labour gain from Conservative		Swing		

=== 2006 ===
Northwick Park (3 seats)
Party	Candidate	Votes	%	±%
Conservative	Eddie Baker	1,564	45.3	
Conservative	Harihar Patel	1,451		
Conservative	John Detre	1,410		
Labour	Bhagwanji Chohan	939	27.2	
Labour	Lawrence Safir	784		
Labour	Mustapha Ishola-Jimoh	780		
Liberal Democrats	Toby Keynes	682	19.8	
Liberal Democrats	Jeetender Dass	629		
Liberal Democrats	Deven Shah	603		
Green	Michael O'Brien	267	7.7	
Turnout		7,567	35	+3
Conservative hold		Swing		
Conservative hold		Swing		
Conservative hold		Swing		

=== 2002 ===
Northwick Park (3 seats)
Party	Candidate	Votes	%	±%
Conservative	Neil Rands	1,355		
Conservative	Gerhard Fiegel	1,340		
Conservative	Harihar Patel	1,321		
Labour	Sylvia Collins	922		
Labour	Mary Daly	831		
Labour	Singarayer Joanes	763		
Liberal Democrats	Jyotshna Patel	529		
Liberal Democrats	Diana Ayres	489		
Liberal Democrats	Derek Jackson	488		
Green	Donald Lowe	64		
Green	Peter Murry	63		
Green	Timothy Turner	60		
Turnout		8,225	31.9	
