= Kenton (ward) =

Electoral ward in Brent, London, England

- Electoral ward for the Brent London Borough Council
- Borough: Brent
- County: Greater London
- Population: 17,686 (2021)
- Major settlements: Kenton
- Area: 3.036 km²

Current electoral ward
- Created: 1965
- Councillors: 3 (since 2002); 2 (1968 to 2002); 3 (1964 to 1968)

Kenton is an electoral ward in the London Borough of Brent. The ward was first used in the 1964 elections. It elects three councillors to Brent London Borough Council.

== History ==
The Kenton ward is considered a stronghold for the Conservative Party in a predominantly Labour-voting borough of London.

== Geography ==
The ward is named after the district of Kenton.

== Councillors ==
Election	Councillors		
2010	Reginald Colwill (Conservative)	Arthur Steel (Conservative)	Bhikubhai Patel (Conservative)
2014	Reginald Colwill (Conservative)	Suresh Kansagra (Conservative)	Bhikubhai Patel (Conservative)
2018	Reginald Colwill (Conservative)	Suresh Kansagra (Conservative)	Michael Maurice (Conservative)
2022	Sunita Hirani (Conservative)	Suresh Kansagra (Conservative)	Michael Maurice (Conservative)

== Elections ==
=== 2022 Brent London Borough Council election ===
Kenton (3 seats)
Party	Candidate	Votes	%	±%
Conservative	Sunita Hirani	2,287	50.5	−0.5
Conservative	Suresh Kansagra*	2,165	47.8	−0.8
Conservative	Michael Maurice*	2,047	45.2	−0.8
Labour	Mansoor Akram*	1,718	38.0	−1.4
Labour	Fiona Mulaisho	1,662	36.7	+0.3
Labour	Jahan Mahmoodi	1,565	34.6	+0.9
Liberal Democrats	Charlie Clinton	397	8.8	−0.6
Green	Baston De'Medici-Jaguar	384	8.5	+1.6
Liberal Democrats	Yulian Dimitrov	250	5.5	−0.3
Liberal Democrats	Ulla Thiessen	250	5.5	+1.4
Turnout		4,525	35.3	−4.5
Registered electors		12,774		
Conservative hold		Swing	+0.95	
Conservative hold		Swing	-0.55	
Conservative hold		Swing	-0.85	

=== 2018 Brent London Borough Council election ===
Kenton
Party	Candidate	Votes	%	±%
Conservative	Suresh Kansagra	1,884	51.0	
Conservative	Reg Colwill	1,795	48.6	
Conservative	Michael Maurice	1,699	46.0	
Labour	Rajan Seelan	1,454	39.4	
Labour	Colum Moloney	1,345	36.4	
Labour	Nyela Reid	1,244	33.7	
Liberal Democrats	Aruna Nair	346	9.4	
Green	Shonte Miller-Howe	256	6.9	
Liberal Democrats	James Thomas	213	5.8	
Liberal Democrats	Duncan Wharton	152	4.1	
Turnout		3,693	39.84	
Conservative hold		Swing		
Conservative hold		Swing		
Conservative hold		Swing		

=== 2014 Brent London Borough Council election ===
Kenton (3 seats)
Party	Candidate	Votes	%	±%
Conservative	Suresh Kansagra	1,798		
Conservative	Reg Colwill	1,796		
Conservative	Bhiku Patel	1,669		
Labour	Syed Alam	1,139		
Labour	Lewis Hodgetts	1,040		
Labour	Nadhim Ahmed	946		
Green	Graham Allen	348		
Liberal Democrats	Violet Steele	221		
Liberal Democrats	Vivienne Williamson	153		
Liberal Democrats	Ieva Tomsone	125		
Total votes		9,235	36	-22
Conservative hold		Swing		
Conservative hold		Swing		
Conservative hold		Swing		

=== 2010 Brent London Borough Council election ===
Kenton (3 seats)
Party	Candidate	Votes	%	±%
Conservative	Bhikubhai Patel	2,805	51.6	
Conservative	Reginald Colwill	2,667	49.1	
Conservative	Arthur Steel	2,333	43.0	
Labour	John Daly	2,218	40.8	
Labour	Ruby Nerva	1,832	33.7	
Labour	Dennis Risby	1,799	33.1	
Liberal Democrats	Felicity Dunn	1,013	18.7	
Liberal Democrats	Hugh Lawson-Tancred	782	14.4	
Liberal Democrats	Riad Siddiqi	630	11.6	
Green	Alan Mathison	287	5.3	
Green	Lawrence Card	265	4.9	
Green	Eileen Mays	230	4.2	
Turnout		5,460	58	+18
Conservative hold		Swing		
Conservative hold		Swing		
Conservative hold		Swing		
