= Tokyngton (ward) =

Electoral ward in Brent, London, England

- Electoral ward for the Brent London Borough Council
- Borough: Brent
- County: Greater London
- Population: 10,006 (2021)
- Major settlements: Tokyngton
- Area: 1.625 km²

Current electoral ward
- Created: 1965
- Councillors: 2 (since 2022); 3 (2002-2022); 2 (1968-2002); 3 (1964-1968)

Tokyngton is an electoral ward in the London Borough of Brent. The ward was first used in the 1964 elections. It elects three councillors to Brent London Borough Council.

== Geography ==
The ward is named after the suburb of Tokyngton.

== Councillors ==
Election	Councillors		
2014	Muhammed Butt (Labour)	Ketan Sheth (Labour)	Orleen Hylton (Labour)
2018	Muhammed Butt (Labour)	Ketan Sheth (Labour)	Orleen Hylton (Labour)
2022	Muhammed Butt (Labour)	Krupa Sheth (Labour)	Two seats

== Elections ==
=== 2022 ===
Tokyngton (2 seats)
Party	Candidate	Votes	%	±%
Labour	Muhammed Butt*	1,447	58.2	−5.3
Labour	Krupa Sheth*	1,408	56.7	−5.7
Conservative	Krunal Patel	649	26.1	+3.8
Conservative	Shamim Chowdhury	537	21.6	+0.2
Green	Martin Francis	306	12.3	+1.5
Liberal Democrats	Ian McAullife	160	6.4	−3.6
Liberal Democrats	Mohammed Khalid	138	5.6	−1.8
Turnout		2,485	34.0	+4.1
Registered electors		7,270		
Labour hold		Swing	-4.55	
Labour hold		Swing	-2.95	

=== 2018 ===
Tokyngton
Party	Candidate	Votes	%	±%
Labour	Muhammed Butt	2,651	63.7	
Labour	Ketan Sheth	2,597	62.4	
Labour	Orleen Hylton	2,522	60.6	
Conservative	Kelvin Bageire	949	22.8	
Conservative	Jonathan Pollock	906	21.8	
Conservative	Dan Russell	838	20.1	
Green	Martin Francis	450	10.8	
Liberal Democrats	Karen Brown	415	10.0	
Liberal Democrats	Abid Khalid	310	7.4	
Turnout		4,164	29.86	
Labour hold		Swing		
Labour hold		Swing		
Labour hold		Swing		

=== 2014 ===
Tokyngton (3 seats)
Party	Candidate	Votes	%	±%
Labour	Muhammed Butt	2,247		
Labour	Ketan Sheth	2,143		
Labour	Orleen Hylton	1,990		
Conservative	Jimmy Desai	816		
Conservative	Jennifer Brown	701		
Conservative	Mesbah Uddin	573		
Liberal Democrats	Vijya Bhudia	502		
Green	Khalid Akram	425		
Liberal Democrats	Chunilal Hirani	406		
Liberal Democrats	Naim Hasani	369		
Total votes		10,172	32	-21
Labour hold		Swing		
Labour hold		Swing		
Labour hold		Swing		
