= Brondesbury Park =

Suburb of London, England

Coordinates: 51.539°N 0.210°W

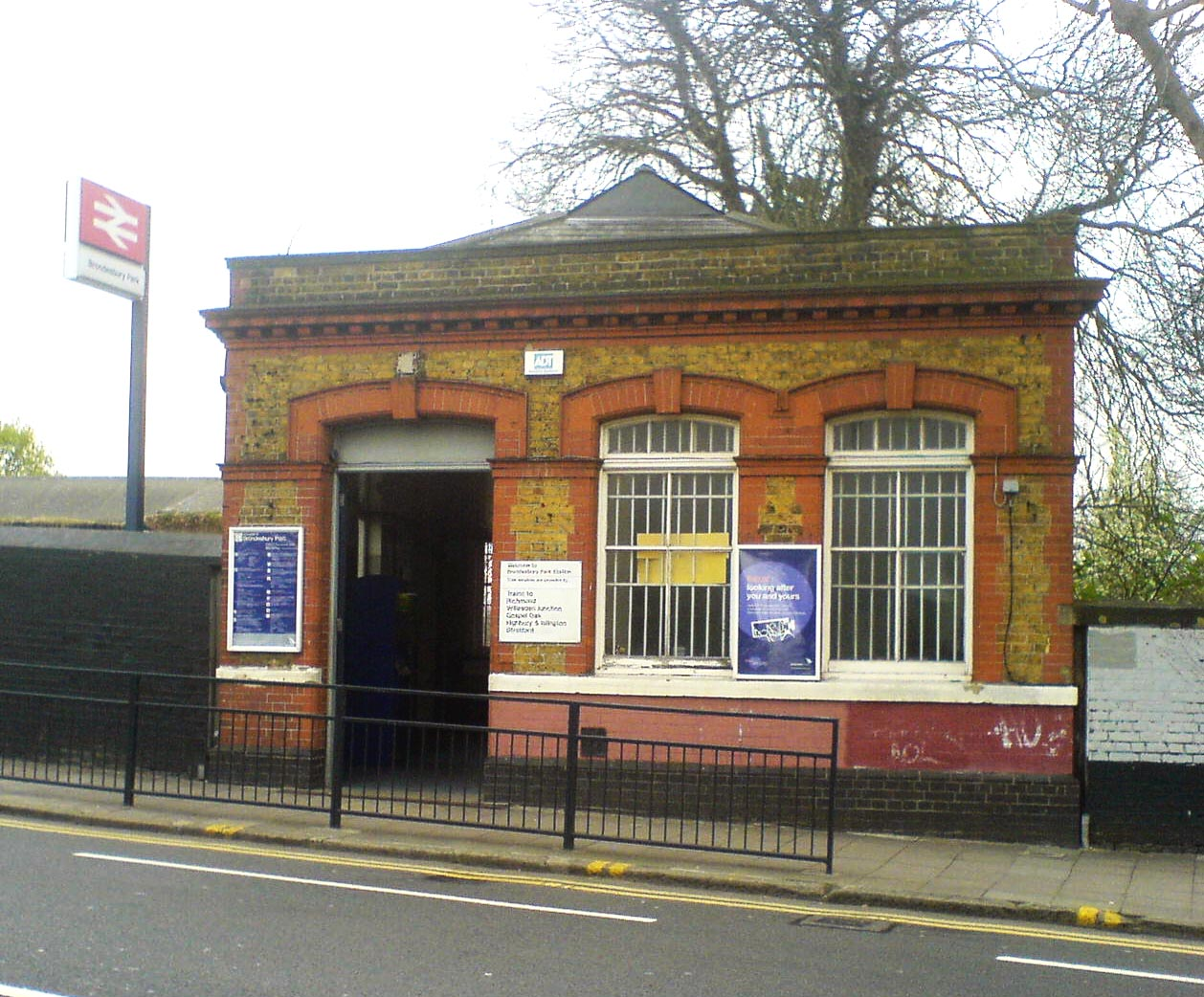
- Brondesbury Park railway station

- Location within Greater London
- Area: 1.7224 km^{2} (0.6650 sq mi)
- Population: 13,023 Brondesbury Park electoral ward
  - Density: 7,561/km^{2} (19,580/sq mi)
- OS grid reference: TQ175855
- London borough: Brent
- Ceremonial county: Greater London
- Region: London
- Country: England
- Sovereign state: United Kingdom
- Post town: LONDON
- Postcode district: NW6
- Dialling code: 020
- Police: Metropolitan
- Fire: London
- Ambulance: London
- UK Parliament: Brent East
- London Assembly: Brent and Harrow

Brondesbury Park is a suburb in the London Borough of Brent, centred on Brondesbury Park railway station and the street, an avenue, which shares its name. The area has a number of open spaces, primarily Queen's Park and Tiverton Green.

== Humphry Repton's Brondesbury Park ==
Brondesbury Park is an alternate name for its manor, a specially empowered division of the large parish of Willesden as one of its eight prebends. The manor house is long-demolished. Landscape designer Humphry Repton transformed the focal 10 acres (4.0 ha) of Brondesbury Park, a varying demesne but in most years 54 acres (22 ha) in the 18th and 19th century, when he designed the garden. The house had been bought by his client Lady (Sarah) Salusbury's in 1789. Repton produced one of his famous 'Red Books' for the manor house, which has been republished, along with his Red Book for Glemham Hall in Suffolk.

Repton planned a garden with views across London, but Lady Salusbury wanted shade rather than sweeping views. The grounds of Lady Salusbury's house only amounted to 10 acres (4.0 ha). Repton found very few trees, so had planted hundreds of mature trees and shrubs. Lady Salusbury was so delighted with the work that she gave Repton a bonus of £50.

Some street names allude to the inclosed private park (garden) dominating the north of the area and notable manorial owners. The street named Brondesbury Park leads into Salusbury Road.

Repton also worked on Wembley Park including what became Wembley Stadium today in the same borough.

== Politics ==
The electoral ward of Brondesbury Park returns two councillors to sit on Brent Council.

After the 2022 council election the two elected councillors are from the Labour Party, Erica Gbajumo and Ryan Hack.

Since the 2024 general election, the ward has formed part of the re-established seat of Brent East.

== Surrounding areas ==
- Willesden, to the north-west
- Mapesbury, to the north (where used)
- Kilburn / Brondesbury, to the east. Kilburn is traditionally the linear settlement along the A5 there.
- Queen's Park, to the south
- Kensal Green and Harlesden, to the west
