= Northwick Park =

Park in London, England

Coordinates: 51.571°N 0.313°W

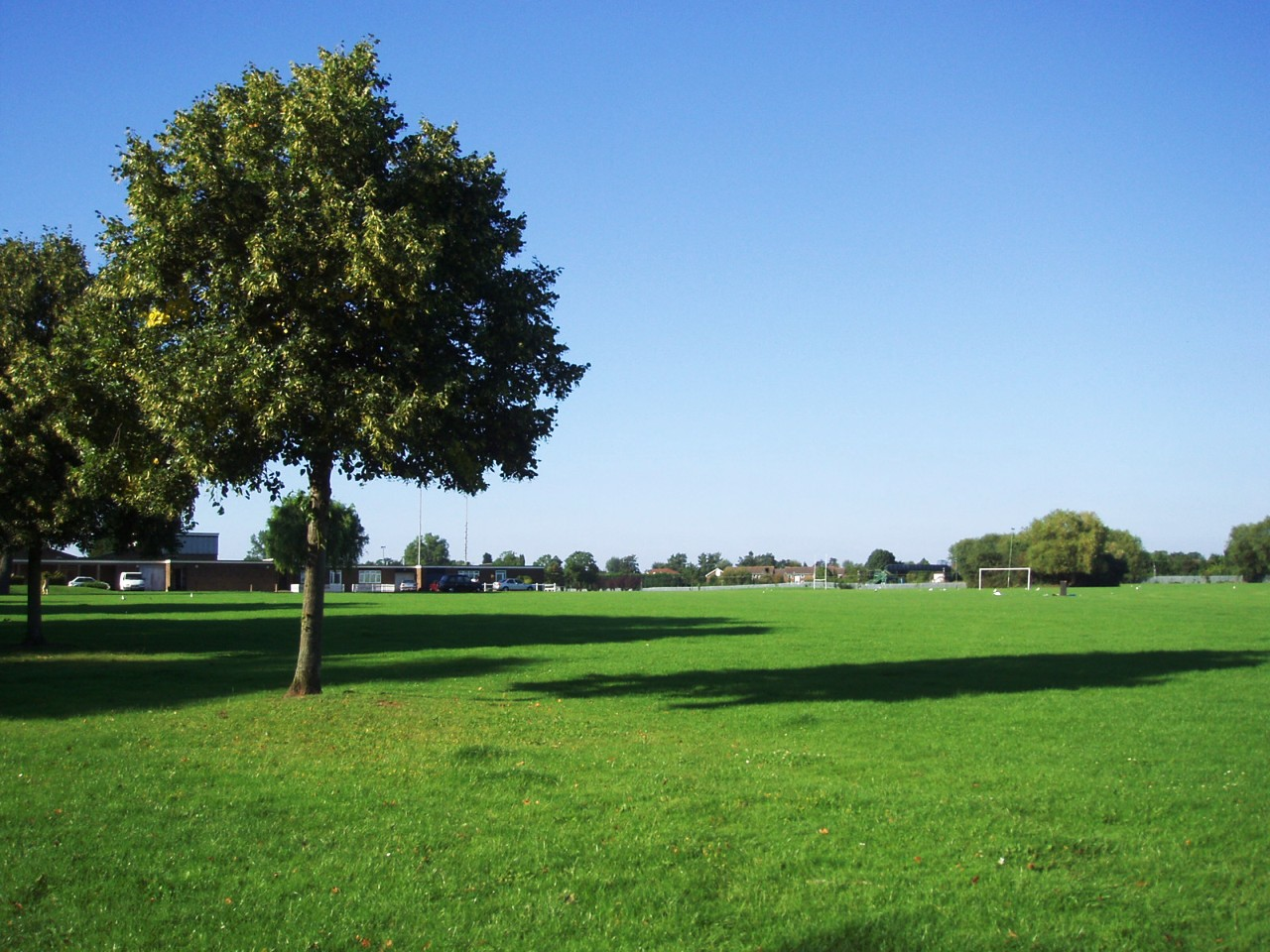
Northwick Park

Northwick Park is a formerly larger public park in the London Borough of Brent between eastern Harrow and Kenton, north-west London. Most of the park consists of playing fields, kite flying areas, and trees. It has often lent its name to the Northwick Park electoral ward of Brent, including namesake tube station, and typically most of North Wembley. It is between the mentioned station on the (Metropolitan line) and South Kenton station on the Bakerloo line.

== History ==
The park was for centuries part of Sheepcote Farm in the manor of Harrow, and named after its lord, Northwick. It passed to affluent Harrow School and then Middlesex County Council acquired its original 192 acres of land from that institution. in the 1930s to plant trees and transform a landscape within existing hedges. The amount of public open space has since diminished with:

- In late 20th century the building, compact landscaping and car park of Northwick Park Hospital, a major NHS hospital.
- The 2006-built pay-for-use golf course, voted number one 9-hole golf course in the UK for 2009 by National Golfers Magazine.
- Saint Cuthbert's Church, North Wembley built in 1958, opened the following year.
- Harrow campus of the University of Westminster.
- Northwick Park village, with a further 1660 homes being built over a decade, from November 2024.

For some time until 1939 the latter hosted an active golf course.

From 1987 to 1991 a Commission looked at carving up Brent, overcome by degree of Brent London Borough Council and local objection, which would have moved the park and locale into the London Borough of Harrow.

== Amenities ==
Today, Northwick Park includes nine standard pitches, three cricket pitches, two Gaelic football pitches, two flying areas and eight softball areas. The park hosts a 1,133-square-metre, brick, single storey pavilion constructed circa 1950 with a hall, sports green, and dedicated car park. It was and can be hired for filming.

== Other notable neighbours ==
All the land to the west, across Watford Road, is split between a Harrow School Playing Field and its school farm.

== Gallery ==
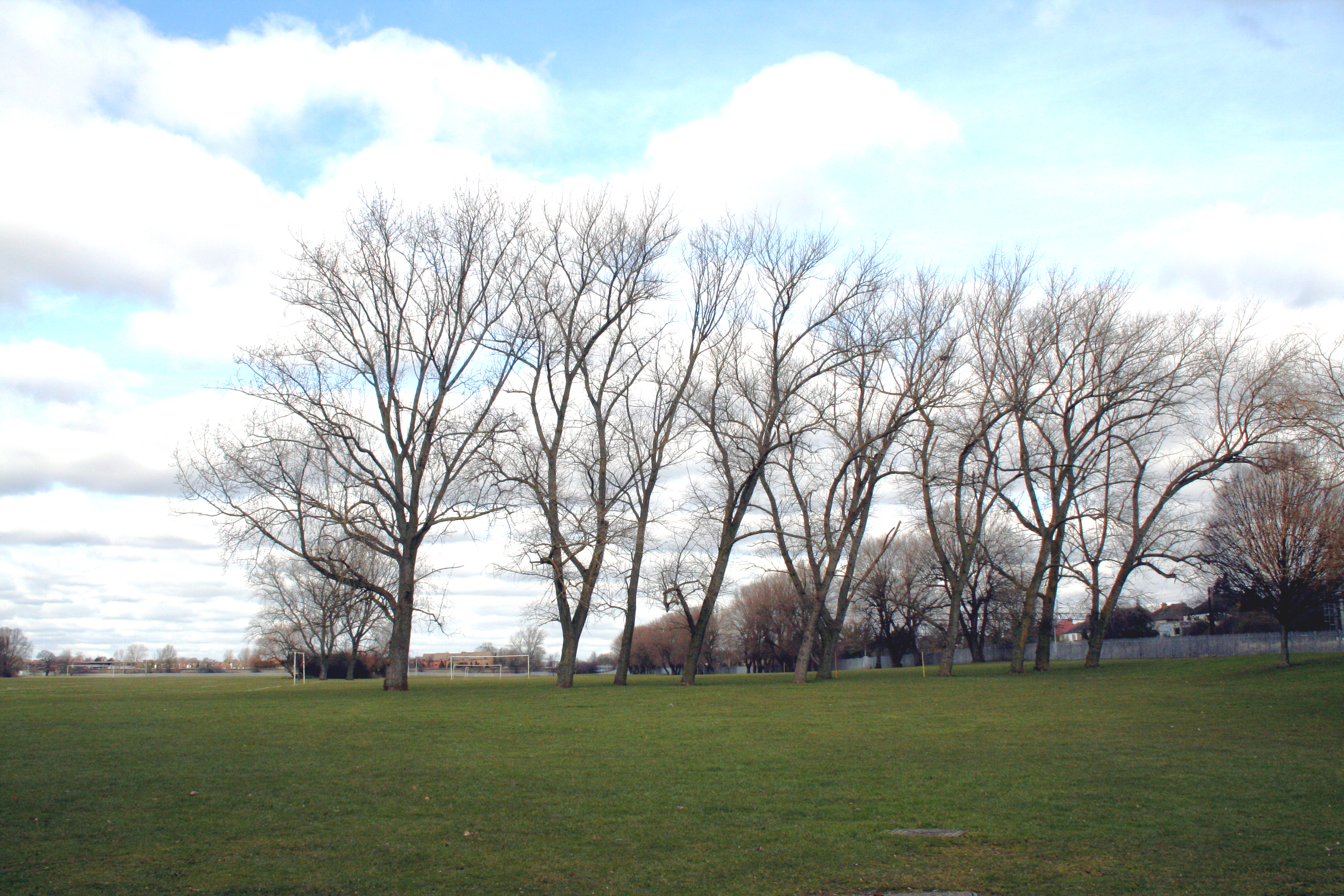
Trees and football pitches in Northwick Park

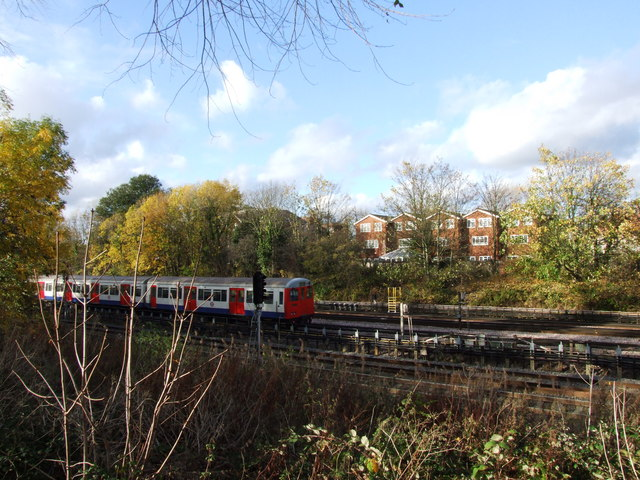
Metropolitan line train riding to the north of the park

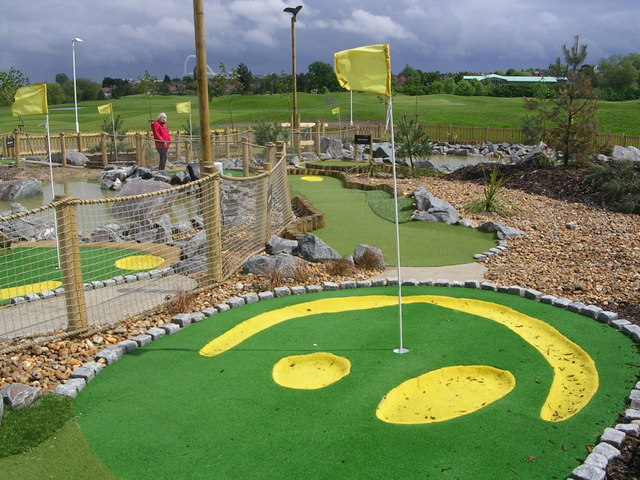
Inside the golf course

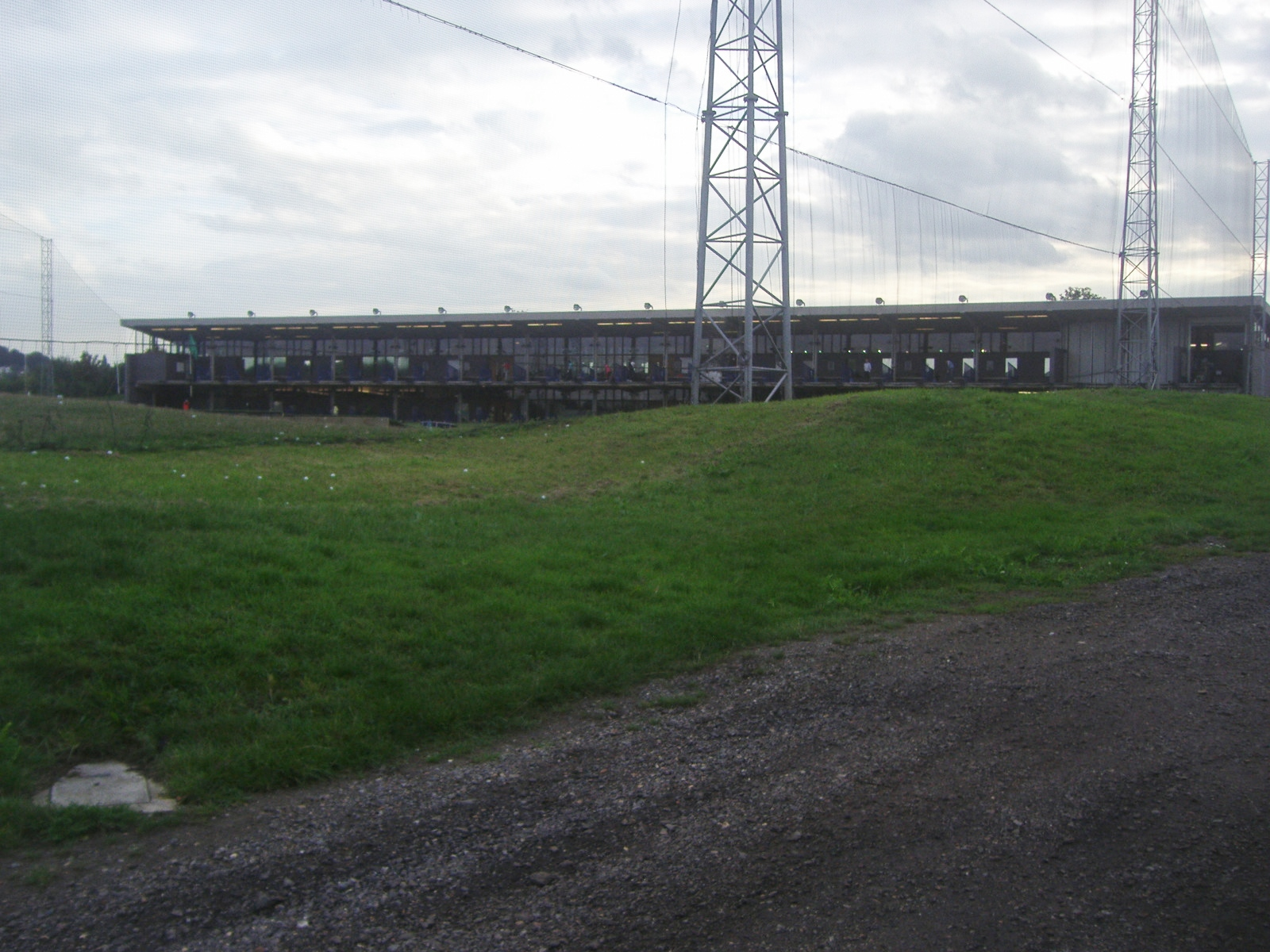
Driving range of the golf course

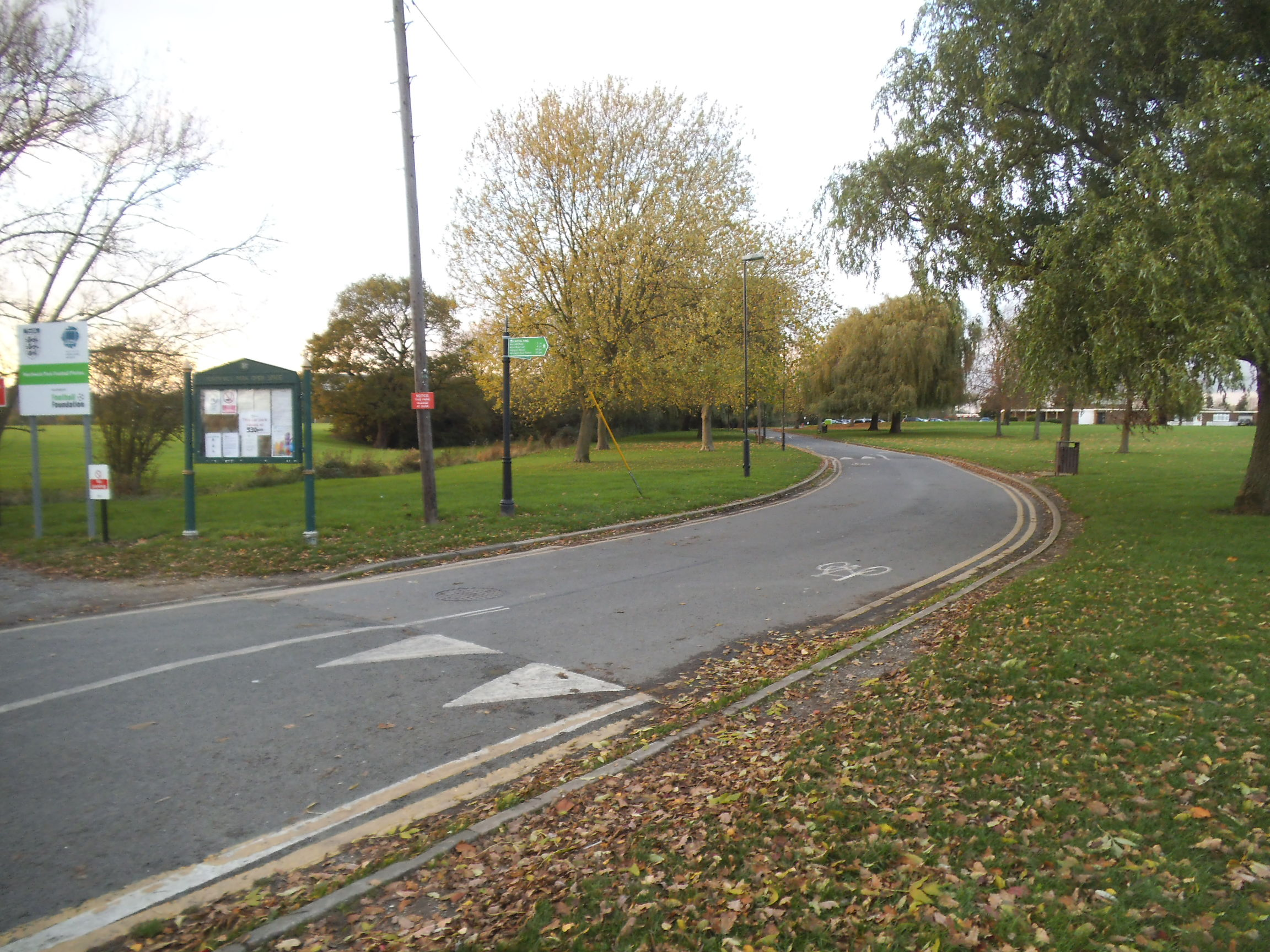
Northwick Park

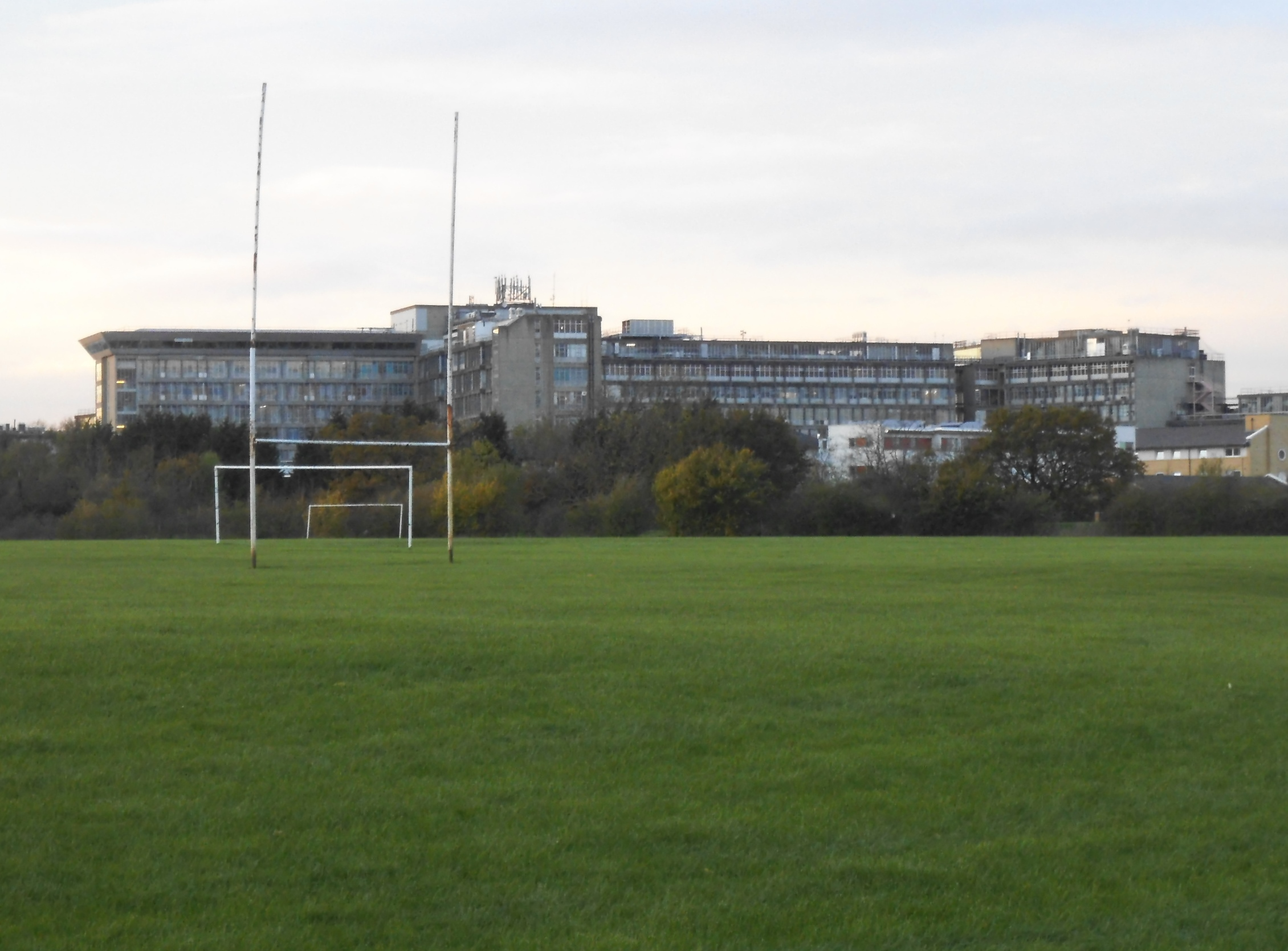
Northwick Park Hospital as seen from Northwick Park
