= Sandra Kabir =

British philanthropist, executive (born 1949)

Cllr Sandra Kabir
- সান্ড্রা কবির

Brent London Borough Councillor for Queensbury ward
- Incumbent
- Assumed office 6 May 2010
- Preceded by: Atiq Malik
- In office 2 May 2002 – 4 May 2006
- Preceded by: Eric McDonald
- Succeeded by: Atiq Malik

Personal details
- Born: Sandra Mostafa Kabir; 2 November 1949 (age 76) London, England
- Party: Labour
- Children: 3
- Occupation: Executive Director of BRAC UK
- Profession: Philanthropist, politician

Sandra Mostafa Kabir (Bengali: সান্ড্রা মোস্তফা কবির; born 2 November 1949) is a British philanthropist, executive director of BRAC UK, Labour Party politician and councillor for Queensbury.

== Early life ==
Kabir is of mixed descent, born to a Bangladeshi father and an English mother. She was born along with her younger brother and sister in London, England. Her mother was born Church of England but was agnostic.

In 1963, Kabir and her family left London when she was 13 because her father decided to return to East Pakistan (now Bangladesh) where he had left from 22 years previously, at the time he was 45 to 46 years old. Her parents died in Bangladesh.

In 1995, Kabir and her second husband returned to London so their youngest child could have a better level of education.

== Career ==
Since 1976, Kabir has worked in development with donor agencies, international and national non-governmental organizations (NGOs). She has worked predominantly in the area of sexual and reproductive health and rights and women's development and rights.

Kabir began her career in Bangladesh as a Programme Officer for the south west Asia regional office of FPIA, established a national women's NGO, played a leading role in the NGO movement and worked on the boards of several NGOs. She has experience in poverty alleviation and people's empowerment programme design and implementation, fund raising and advocacy, spanning Asia, Africa and the United Kingdom. Kabir worked in the regional office of the Family Planning International Assistance (FPIA), an agency disbursing United States Agency for International Development (USAID). After the Ronald Reagan administration decided to withdraw funding for abortion, USAID exerted pressure on Bangladeshi and international organisations receiving USAID fund to segregate menstrual regulation and medically induced abortion from other services. Kabir joined Concerned Women for Family Planning, which received funding from FPIA but also eventually came under pressure from USAID.

In 1979, she played a major role in the creation of El Taller, a worldwide NGO movement initially based in Spain and then in Tunisia. In 1980, Kabir established the Bangladesh Women's Health Coalition (BWHC). whose clinics provide menstrual regulation.

In 1995, Kabir moved to the United Kingdom where she worked in senior capacities with Interact Worldwide, Reproductive Health Alliance and ICOMP. In 2006, she established BRAC UK a member of the world-renowned NGO, BRAC. BRAC UK works both locally and internationally and has gained recognition for its work on money management and international development education in East London.

Since 1997, Kabir has been involved in community-based activities in East London.

Kabir has been on Bangladesh and UK government delegations to international UN conferences, is on the board of several NGOs in the UK and is a school governor. She is on the board of the Tower Hamlets CVS, the Attlee Foundation, the Diaspora Volunteering Alliance and others.

On 24 January 2011, the founding leaders of BRAC UK – Professor Patrick Vaughan (Chairperson) and Sandra Kabir (Executive Director) – both announced that they would be retiring in early 2011.

=== Politics ===
In 1994, Kabir joined the Labour Party. She was an elected councillor for Queensbury ward in Brent London Borough Council from 2002 to 2006 before being re-elected in 2010 and 2014. As a councilor, Kabir's particular areas of interest are health, women's issues and citizenship. She is also a school governor and a member of several Council committees.

== Awards ==
In 1988, Kabir was awarded the international STIMEZO Prize, for her contribution to making abortion safe worldwide.

== Personal life ==
Kabir is widowed, has three children and two grandchildren.

In 1967, at the age of 17, Kabir got married and had son (born 1969) and daughter (born 1971) before getting divorced in 1976.

In February 1972, her mother died of appendicitis, and in 1979, her father died.

In 1979, Kabir met her second husband whom she married in 1980, and they have a daughter (born 1982). In October 1997, Kabir's second husband died of a liver disease.

Kabir's brother (born 1954) lives in Brisbane, Australia. Her sister (born 1959) is a journalist and lives in Bangladesh. Kabir lives in London, England with her eldest son, Feisal Kabir, who works for a property company.

== Books ==
- Hardon, Anita; Mutua, Ann; Kabir, Sandra; Engelkes, Elly. (1997). "Monitoring Family Planning and Reproductive Rights: A Manual for Empowerment". Zed Books. ISBN 1856494551. ISBN 978-1856494557
- Bonnie, Kay; Kabir, Sandra. (1988). "A study of costs and behavioral outcomes of menstrual regulation services in Bangladesh". Elsevier

== See also ==
- British Bangladeshi
- List of British Bangladeshis
- List of ethnic minority politicians in the United Kingdom
