= Shama Tatler, Baroness Shah =

British politician

The Right Honourable The Baroness Shah
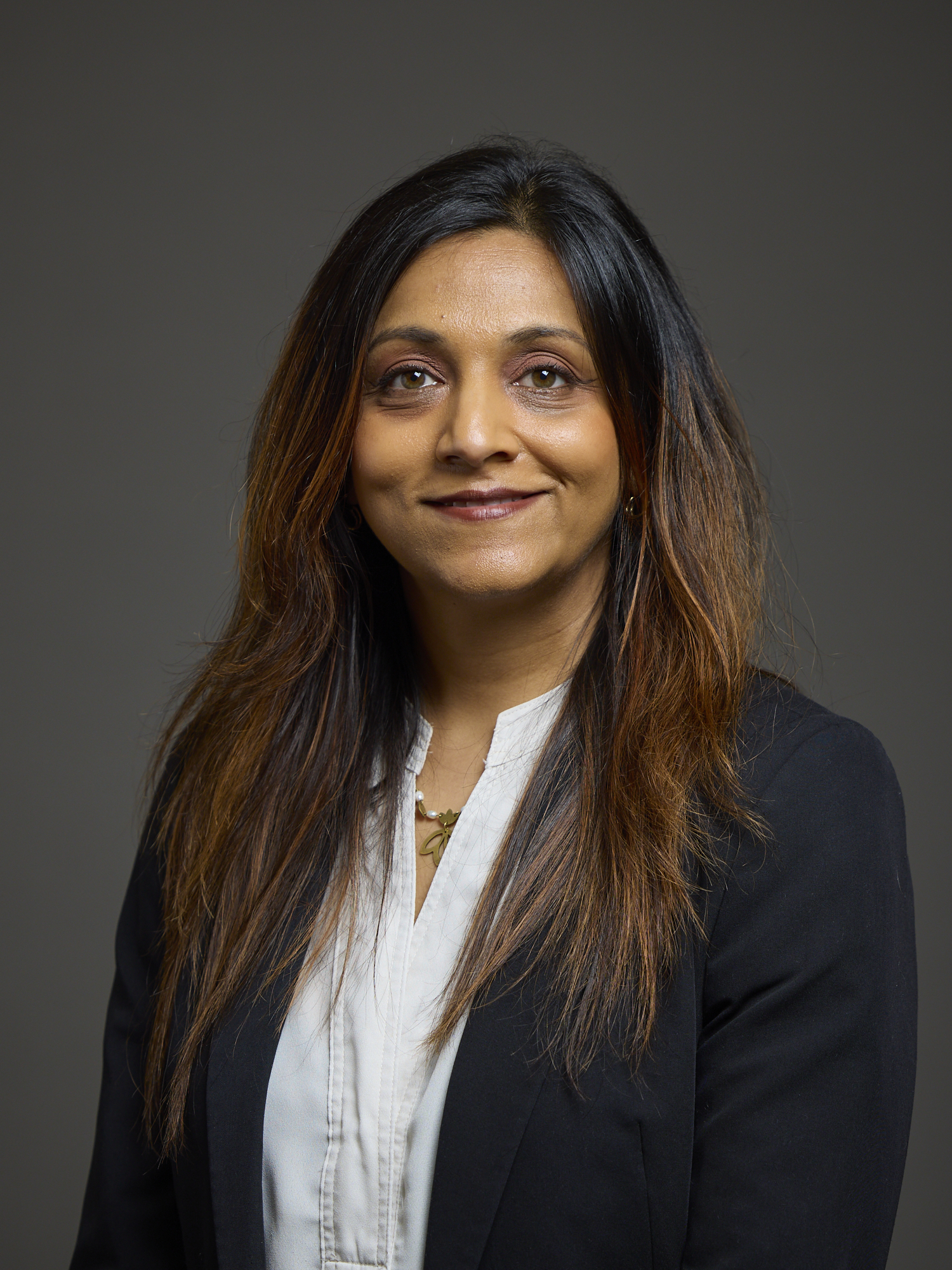
- Official portrait, 2026

Member of the House of Lords
- Lord Temporal
- Life peerage 9 January 2026

Personal details
- Born: Shama Shilesh Shah c. 1983 (age 42–43) Barnet, London, England
- Party: Labour
- Spouse: Richard Tatler (died)
- Education: University of Kent (BA)

Shama Shilesh Tatler, Baroness Shah (née Shah; born c. 1983) is a British politician and teacher.

== Career ==
Tatler was previously head of the Labour Group Office at the Local Government Association. She was a member of Brent London Borough Council for Kingsbury from 2014 till 2026. Tatler is co-chair of the Labour To Win group.

Following Faiza Shaheen's deselection as Labour candidate in Chingford and Woodford Green at the 2024 general election, Tatler was chosen to stand for the Labour party. She finished second with over a quarter of the vote, losing to Iain Duncan Smith and winning 79 votes more than Shaheen.

She was given a life peerage in 2025, which marked the first Jain to be appointed to the House of Lords.

== Personal life ==
Tatler married a fellow schoolteacher, Richard, with whom she had a daughter. Richard died at age 36 in April 2016 from complications due to cancer.
