= Dollis Hill (ward) =

Electoral ward in Brent, London, England

- Electoral ward for the Brent London Borough Council
- Borough: Brent
- County: Greater London
- Population: 21,848 (2021)
- Major settlements: Dollis Hill
- Area: 3.224 km²

Current electoral ward
- Created: 2002
- Councillors: 3

Dollis Hill is an electoral ward in the London Borough of Brent. The ward was first used in the 2002 elections. It elects three councillors to Brent London Borough Council.

== Geography ==
The ward is named after the suburb of Dollis Hill.

== Councillors ==
Election	Councillors		
2014	Parvez Ahmed (Labour)	Liz Dixon (Labour)	Arshad Mahmood (Labour)
2018	Parvez Ahmed (Labour)	Liz Dixon (Labour)	Arshad Mahmood (Labour)
2022	Parvez Ahmed (Labour)	Liz Dixon (Labour)	Arshad Mahmood (Labour)

== Elections ==
=== 2022 Brent London Borough Council election ===
Dollis Hill (3 seats)
Party	Candidate	Votes	%	±%
Labour	Parvez Ahmed*	2,310	58.9	
Labour	Liz Dixon*	2,307	58.9	
Labour	Arshad Mahmood*	2,183	55.7	
Liberal Democrats	Alison Hopkins	842	21.5	
Conservative	Richard Lacey	614	15.7	
Conservative	Anisha Patel	599	15.3	
Conservative	Anand Roy	541	13.8	
Liberal Democrats	Daniel Brown	471	12.0	
Green	Peter Murry	437	11.1	
Liberal Democrats	Vivienna Williamson	410	10.5	
Turnout		3,920	27.8	−15.3
Registered electors		14,034		
Labour hold		Swing		
Labour hold		Swing		
Labour hold		Swing		

=== 2018 Brent London Borough Council election ===
Dollis Hill
Party	Candidate	Votes	%	±%
Labour	Parvez Ahmed	2,195	55.4	
Labour	Liz Dixon	2,131	53.8	
Labour	Arshad Mahmood	2,100	53.0	
Liberal Democrats	Alison Hopkins	1,355	34.2	
Liberal Democrats	Naim Hasani	913	23.0	
Liberal Democrats	Afifa Pervez	857	21.6	
Conservative	Richard Lacey	429	10.8	
Conservative	Mark Oates	354	8.9	
Conservative	Harry Quainoo	342	8.6	
Duma Polska	Robert Nowak	67	1.7	
Duma Polska	Robert Gajdzinski	65	1.6	
Duma Polska	Anna Paskiewicz	63	1.6	
Turnout		3,963	43.07	
Labour hold		Swing		
Labour hold		Swing		
Labour hold		Swing		

=== 2014 Brent London Borough Council election ===
Dollis Hill (3 seats)
Party	Candidate	Votes	%	±%
Labour	Parvez Ahmed	1,715		
Labour	Arshad Mahmood	1,669		
Labour	Liz Dixon	1,566		
Liberal Democrats	Alison Hopkins	1,515		
Liberal Democrats	Alex Melia	1,175		
Liberal Democrats	Mohammad Anwar	1,172		
Conservative	Rbee Mehmood	536		
Conservative	Suresh Prajapati	442		
Conservative	Gopal Sachdev	393		
Green	Pete Murry	288		
Total votes		10,471	44	-8
Labour gain from Liberal Democrats		Swing		
Labour gain from Liberal Democrats		Swing		
Labour gain from Liberal Democrats		Swing		
