= Willesden Green (ward) =

Electoral ward in Brent, London, England

- Electoral ward for the Brent London Borough Council
- Borough: Brent
- County: Greater London
- Population: 18,957 (2021)
- Major settlements: Willesden Green
- Area: 1.402 km²

Current electoral ward
- Created: 1965
- Councillors: 3

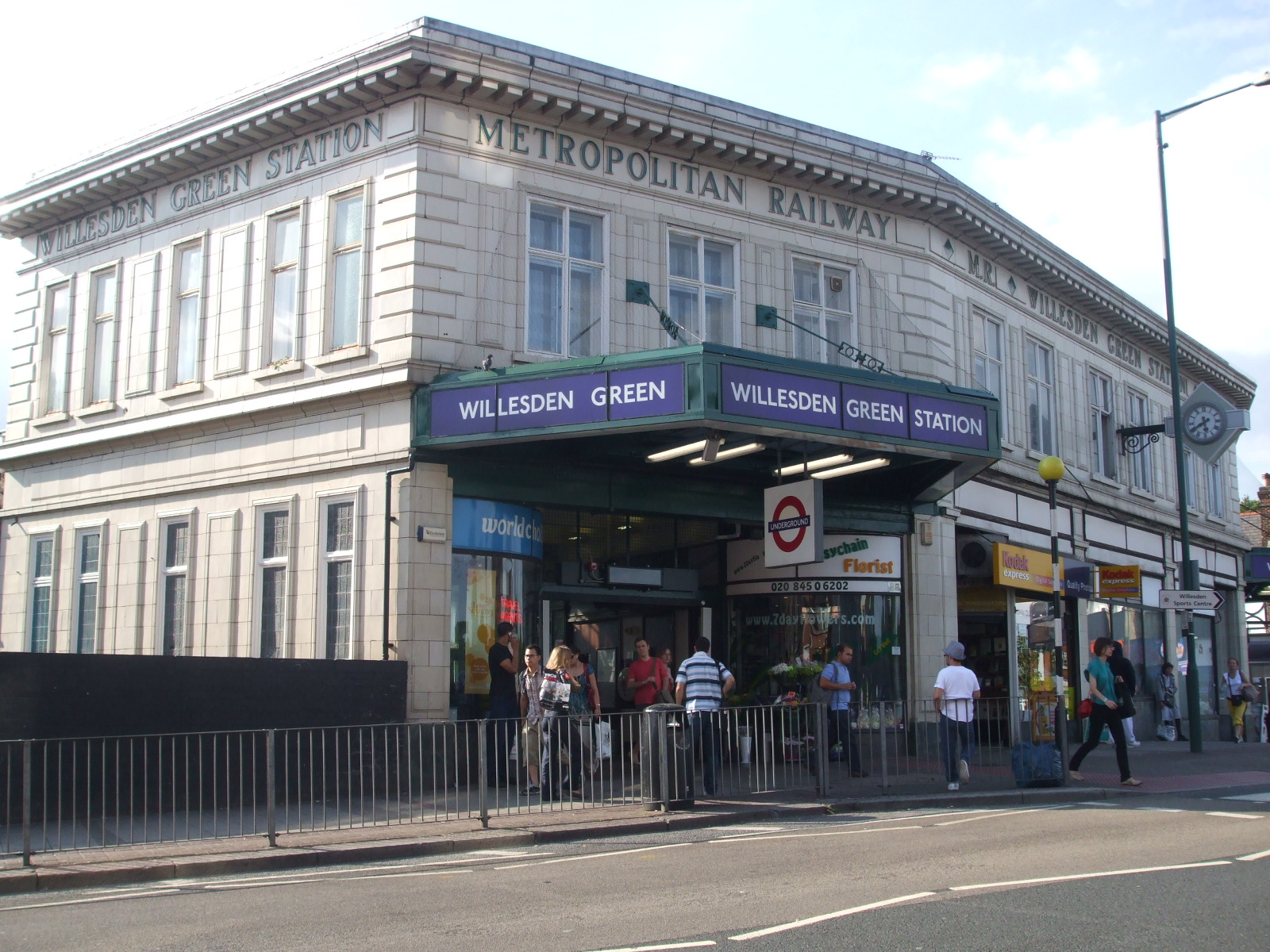
Willesden Green tube station viewed from the south, a second entrance can be seen on the northern side.

Willesden Green is an electoral ward in the London Borough of Brent. The ward was first used in the 1964 elections. It elects three councillors to Brent London Borough Council. It is part of the constituency of Brent East.

== Geography ==
The ward is named after the area of Willesden Green.

== Councillors ==
Election	Councillors		
2018	Tom Miller (Labour)	Fleur Donnelly-Jackson (Labour)	Elliiot Chappell (Labour)
2022	Tom Miller (Labour)	Saqlain Choudry (Labour)	Janice Long (Labour)
2026	George Burn (Labour)	Saqlain Choudry (Labour)	Mary Mitchell (Green)

== Elections ==
=== 2026 ===
Willesden Green
Party	Candidate	Votes	%	±%
Liberal Democrats	Philip Alexander	524	12.2	
Reform	Andrew Beckman	523	12.2	
Labour	George Burn	1,566	36.5	
Labour	Saqlain Choudry	1,714	40.0	
Liberal Democrats	Mark Cummins	449	10.5	
Conservative	Mohamed Elnaiem	346	8.1	
Green	Tony Ethapemi	1,478	34.5	
Reform	Emmanuel Flavius	424	9.9	
Conservative	Christopher Geldart	442	10.3	
Green	Mary Mitchell	1,654	38.6	
Reform	Satish Ramanandan	386	9.0	
Green	Nat Teves	1,380	32.2	
Labour	Prerna Thakkar	1,338	31.2	
Liberal Democrats	Ulla Thiessen	316	7.4	
Conservative	Retno Widuri	328	7.6	
Turnout				
Labour hold				
Labour hold				
Green gain from Labour				

=== 2022 ===
Willesden Green
Party	Candidate	Votes	%	±%
Labour	Janice Long*	2,455	61.8	−5.8
Labour	Saqlain Choudry	2,322	58.5	−8.9
Labour	Tom Miller*	2,114	53.2	−11.8
Green	William Relton	838	21.1	9.5
Liberal Democrats	Philip Alexander	607	15.3	5.1
Conservative	Raffles Fulton	554	14.0	2.8
Conservative	Hannah Phillips	546	13.7	4.2
Liberal Democrats	Isabella Thomas	534	13.4	5.8
Conservative	Barkha Sharma	487	12.3	3.5
Liberal Democrats	Max Fuller	480	12.1	4.7
Turnout		3,971	30.9	+5.4
Registered electors		12,784		
Labour hold		Swing	-7.65	
Labour hold		Swing	-7.00	
Labour hold		Swing	-7.30	

=== 2018 ===
Willesden Green
Party	Candidate	Votes	%	±%
Labour	Fleur Donnelly-Jackson	1,683	67.6	
Labour	Elliot George Chappell	1,679	67.4	
Labour	Tom Miller	1,618	65.0	
Green	Shaka Lish	289	11.6	
Conservative	Harry Goodwill	280	11.2	
Green	Peter Murry	256	10.3	
Liberal Democrats	Felicity Jane Dunn	254	10.2	
Green	William Relton	250	10.0	
Conservative	Shahin Chowdury	237	9.5	
Conservative	Ali Mahmoud Al Jawad	218	8.8	
Liberal Democrats	Ulla Ursula Thiessen	189	7.6	
Liberal Democrats	Christopher Charles Wheatley	184	7.4	
Turnout		2,503	25.49	
Labour hold		Swing		
Labour hold		Swing		
Labour hold		Swing		
