= Brondesbury Park (ward) =

Electoral ward in Brent, London, England

- Electoral ward for the Brent London Borough Council
- Borough: Brent
- County: Greater London
- Population: 13,435 (2021)
- Major settlements: Brondesbury Park
- Area: 1.723 km²

Current electoral ward
- Created: 1965
- Number of members: 2 (since 2022); 3 (2002-2022); 2 (1964-2002)
- Councillors: Erica Gbajumo; Ryan Hack

Brondesbury Park is an electoral ward in the London Borough of Brent. The ward was first used in the 1964 elections. It elects three councillors to Brent London Borough Council.

== Geography ==
The ward is named after the suburb of Brondesbury Park.

== Councillors ==
Election	Councillors		
2018	Erica Gbajumo (Labour)	Keiron Gill (Labour)	Tony Ethapemi (Labour)
2022	Erica Gbajumo (Labour)	Ryan Hack (Labour)	Two seats

== Elections ==
=== 2022 Brent London Borough Council election ===
Brondesbury Park (2 seats)
Party	Candidate	Votes	%	±%
Labour	Erica Gbajumo*	1,658	55.1	+9.7
Labour	Ryan Hack	1,464	48.7	+4.0
Conservative	Sapna Chadha	790	26.3	−16.5
Conservative	Bertha Joseph	713	23.7	−12.5
Green	Natasha Woodward	481	16.0	New
Liberal Democrats	Mark Cummins	305	7.6	−4.4
Liberal Democrats	Jonny Singh	238	7.9	−3.6
Turnout		3,008	31.2	−9.7
Registered electors		9,556		
Labour hold		Swing	+13.1	
Labour hold		Swing	+8.25	

=== 2018 Brent London Borough Council election ===
Brondesbury Park
Party	Candidate	Votes	%	±%
Labour	Kieron Gill	1,674	45.7	+14.7
Labour	Erica Gbajumo	1,660	45.4	
Labour	Tony Ethapemi	1,636	44.7	
Conservative	Carol Shaw	1,567	42.8	
Conservative	John Warren	1,324	36.2	
Conservative	Bertha Joseph	1,261	34.5	
Liberal Democrats	Tilly McAuliffe	439	12.0	
Liberal Democrats	John Duggan	420	11.5	
Liberal Democrats	Edward Round	320	8.7	
Turnout		3,660	40.93	
Labour gain from Conservative		Swing	+14.7	
Labour gain from Conservative		Swing		
Labour gain from Conservative		Swing		
