= Pinner South =

Electoral ward in London, England

- Electoral ward for the Harrow London Borough Council
- Pinner South ward boundaries since 2022
- Borough: Harrow
- County: Greater London
- Population: 15,739 (2021) (Note: 2021 Census data reported for 2022 ward boundaries)
- Major settlements: Pinner
- Area: 3.208 km²

Current electoral ward
- Created: 1965–1978 (first creation); 2002 (second creation)
- Number of members: 1965–1978: 5; 2002–present: 3
- Councillors: Hitesh Karia; Christopher Baxter; Janet Mote
- GSS code: E05013556 (2022–present)

Pinner South is an electoral ward in the London Borough of Harrow. The ward was originally created in 1965 and abolished in 1978. It was created again in 2002. It returns councillors to Harrow London Borough Council.

== List of councillors ==
=== Second creation ===
Seat	Councillor	Took office	Left office	Party	Election
1	Charles Mote	2002	2021	Conservative	2002 ... 2018
2	Gordon Williams	2002	2006	Conservative	2002
3	John Nickolay	2002	2014	Conservative	2002, 2006, 2010
2	Salim Miah	2006	2010	Conservative	2006
2	Kamaljit Chana	2010	2022	Conservative	2010, 2014, 2018
3	Richard Almond	2014	2022	Conservative	2014, 2018
1	Hitesh Karia	2021	Incumbent	Conservative	2021, 2022, 2026
2	June Baxter	2022	2026	Conservative	2022
3	Jean Lammiman	2022	2026	Conservative	2022
2	Christopher Baxter	2026	Incumbent	Conservative	2026
3	Janet Mote	2026	Incumbent	Conservative	2026

== Harrow council elections since 2022 ==
There was a revision of ward boundaries in Harrow in 2022.

=== 2026 election ===
The election took place on 7 May 2026.

2026 Harrow London Borough Council election: Pinner South
Party	Candidate	Votes	%	±%
Turnout				
	Conservative hold	Swing		
	Conservative hold	Swing		
	Conservative hold	Swing		

=== 2022 election ===
The election took place on 5 May 2022.

2022 Harrow London Borough Council election: Pinner South
Party	Candidate	Votes	%	±%
Conservative	June Baxter	2,418	52.3	
Conservative	Hitesh Karia	2,305	49.8	
Conservative	Jean Lammiman	2,097	45.3	
Labour	Finley Harnett	1,728	37.4	
Labour	William Phillips	1,442	31.2	
Labour	Raj Vakesan	1,380	29.9	
Liberal Democrats	Sanjay Karia	865	18.7	
Green	Alexander Lee	747	16.1	
Reform	Zbigniew Kowalczyk	108	2.3	
Turnout		4,626	41.0	
Conservative win (new boundaries)				
Conservative win (new boundaries)				
Conservative win (new boundaries)				

== 2002–2022 Harrow council elections ==
Pinner South ward boundaries from 2002 to 2022

=== 2021 by-election ===
The by-election took place on 14 October 2021, following the death of Chris Mote.

2021 Pinner South by-election
Party	Candidate	Votes	%	±%
Conservative	Hitesh Karia	1,392	60.5	▲1.6
Liberal Democrats	Sanjay Karia	390	16.9	▲2.1
Labour	Brahma Mohanty	331	14.4	▼11.9
Green	Alexander Lee	188	8.2	▲8.2
Majority		1,002	43.5	
Turnout		2,301		
Conservative hold		Swing		

=== 2018 election ===
The election took place on 3 May 2018.

2018 Harrow London Borough Council election: Pinner South
Party	Candidate	Votes	%	±%
Conservative	Richard Almond	2,156	60.4	+4.0
Conservative	Kamaljit Chana	2,024	56.7	+7.1
Conservative	Charles Mote	2,019	56.5	+4.2
Labour	Anne Whitehead	965	27.0	−4.7
Labour	Ann Groves	941	26.4	−3.7
Labour	David Nash	910	25.5	−2.9
Liberal Democrats	Bronwen Jones	542	15.2	N/A
Liberal Democrats	Robert Pitt	487	13.6	N/A
Total votes				
Conservative hold		Swing		
Conservative hold		Swing		
Conservative hold		Swing		

=== 2014 election ===
The election took place on 22 May 2014.

2014 Harrow London Borough Council election: Pinner South
Party	Candidate	Votes	%	±%
Conservative	Richard Almond	1,889	56.4	+4.8
Conservative	Charles Mote	1,751	52.3	−6.1
Conservative	Kamaljit Chana	1,659	49.6	+1.5
Labour	Jane Massey	1,062	31.7	+1.8
Labour	Benjamin Young	1,007	30.1	+3.7
Labour	Ashwin Dharmasingham	949	28.4	+5.3
UKIP	Colin Turfus	511	15.3	N/A
Turnout		3,347	41.2	
Conservative hold		Swing		
Conservative hold		Swing		
Conservative hold		Swing		

=== 2010 election ===
The election on 6 May 2010 took place on the same day as the United Kingdom general election.

2010 Harrow London Borough Council election: Pinner South
Party	Candidate	Votes	%	±%
Conservative	Charles Mote	3,400	58.4	
Conservative	John Nickolay	3,002	51.6	
Conservative	Kamaljit Chana	2,801	48.1	
Labour	Jane Massey	1,740	29.9	
Labour	Uma Kumaran	1,535	26.4	
Liberal Democrats	Benedict Rich	1,527	26.2	
Labour	Ernest Selby	1,343	23.1	
Turnout		5,863	72.8	
Conservative hold		Swing		
Conservative hold		Swing		
Conservative hold		Swing		

=== 2006 election ===
The election took place on 4 May 2006.

2006 Harrow London Borough Council election: Pinner South
Party	Candidate	Votes	%	±%
Conservative	Charles Mote	2,226	63.5	
Conservative	John Nickolay	2,068		
Conservative	Salim Miah	1,886		
Liberal Democrats	Benedict Rich	670	19.1	
Liberal Democrats	Susan Boobis	612		
Labour	Pauline Egan	609	17.4	
Labour	James Coyle	591		
Liberal Democrats	Peter Fletcher	549		
Labour	Ernest Selby	537		
Turnout			44.5	
Conservative hold		Swing		
Conservative hold		Swing		
Conservative hold		Swing		

=== 2002 election ===
The election took place on 2 May 2002.

2002 Harrow London Borough Council election: Pinner South
Party	Candidate	Votes	%
Conservative	Charles Mote	1,812	23.1
Conservative	Gordon Williams	1,766	22.5
Conservative	John Nickolay	1,734	22.1
Labour	Joseph Lilley	897	11.4
Labour	Asoke Dutta	818	10.4
Labour	Ernest Selby	795	10.1
Total votes		7,822	100
Turnout			36.2
Conservative win (new seat)			
Conservative win (new seat)			
Conservative win (new seat)			

== 1964–1978 Harrow council elections ==
=== 1974 election ===
The election took place on 2 May 1974.

1974 Harrow London Borough Council election: Pinner South
Party	Candidate	Votes	%	±%
Turnout				
	Conservative hold	Swing		
	Conservative hold	Swing		
	Conservative hold	Swing		
	Conservative hold	Swing		
	Conservative hold	Swing		

=== 1971 election ===
The election took place on 13 May 1971.

1971 Harrow London Borough Council election: Pinner South
Party	Candidate	Votes	%	±%
Turnout				
	Conservative hold	Swing		
	Conservative hold	Swing		
	Conservative hold	Swing		
	Conservative hold	Swing		
	Conservative hold	Swing		

=== 1969 by-election ===
The by-election took place on 8 October 1969.

1969 Pinner South by-election
Party	Candidate	Votes	%	±%
Conservative	M. Murphy	1,865		
Liberal	W. Westaway	591		
Labour	B. Perigoe	267		
Union Movement	K. Thompson	76		
Turnout			22.0	
Conservative hold		Swing		

=== 1968 election ===
The election took place on 9 May 1968.

1968 Harrow London Borough Council election: Pinner South
Party	Candidate	Votes	%	±%
Turnout				
	Conservative hold	Swing		
	Conservative hold	Swing		
	Conservative hold	Swing		
	Conservative hold	Swing		
	Conservative hold	Swing		

=== 1964 election ===
The election took place on 7 May 1964.

1964 Harrow London Borough Council election: Pinner South
Party	Candidate	Votes	%	±%
Conservative	D. Nott-Cock	3,601		
Conservative	Alfred Sellers	3,591		
Conservative	Owen Cock	3,585		
Conservative	William Clack	3,571		
Conservative	Charles Jordan	3,543		
Liberal	W. Westaway	1,004		
Liberal	W. Little	990		
Liberal	G. Davis	974		
Liberal	T. Kettle	956		
Liberal	J. Anthony	953		
Labour	J. Clark	947		
Labour	Colin Litchfield	802		
Labour	Jeremy Lansdell	788		
Labour	A. Littlehales	759		
Labour	G. Tempest	753		
Turnout		5,447	42.8	
Conservative win (new seat)				
Conservative win (new seat)				
Conservative win (new seat)				
Conservative win (new seat)				
Conservative win (new seat)				
