= Harrow London Borough Council elections =

English local elections

Harrow London Borough Council in London, England is elected every four years. Since the last boundary changes in 2022, 55 councillors are elected from 22 wards.

== Council elections ==
Election	Conservative	Labour	Liberal Democrats (Note: Liberal Party, 1964–1978; SDP–Liberal Alliance, 1982–1986)	Residents' associations	Independent	Arise	Council control after election
1964	36	20	0	—N/a	—N/a	—N/a	Conservative
1968	56	0	0	0	—N/a	—N/a	Conservative
1971	26	27	2	1	—N/a	—N/a	No overall control
1974	39	14	0	3	—N/a	—N/a	Conservative
1978 (Note: Boundary changes increased the number of seats by seven.)	46	12	1	4	0	—N/a	Conservative
1982	41	6	13	3	—N/a	—N/a	Conservative
1986	32	9	18	4	0	—N/a	Conservative
1990	36	13	11	3	0	—N/a	Conservative
1994	17	14	29	3	0	—N/a	No overall control
1998	20	32	9	2	—N/a	—N/a	Labour
2002 (Note: Boundary changes took place but the number of seats remained the same.)	29	31	3	—N/a	—N/a	—N/a	No overall control
2006	38	24	1	—N/a	0	—N/a	Conservative
2010	27	34	1	—N/a	1	—N/a	Labour
2014	26	34	1	—N/a	2	—N/a	Labour
2018	28	35	0	—N/a	0	—N/a	Labour
2022 (Note: Boundary changes decreased the number of seats by eight.)	31	24	0	—N/a	0	—N/a	Conservative
2026	42	12	0	—N/a	—	1	Conservative

- Conservative
- Labour
- Liberal Democrats
- RAs
- Independent
- Arise

=== Borough result maps ===
2002 results map

2006 results map

2010 results map

2014 results map

2018 results map

2022 results map

2026 results map

== By-election results ==
=== 1964-1968 ===
There were a total of 12 by-elections, including eight on 24 June 1964 caused by aldermanic elections.

=== 1968-1971 ===
Wealdstone South by-election, 4 July 1968
Party	Candidate	Votes	%	±%
Conservative	J. O. Edis	946		
Liberal	J. E. H. Davies	532		
Labour	A. H. Elderton	454		
Union Movement	R. H. F. Smyth	45		
Communist	M. I. Robinson	24		
Turnout			26.1%	

Stanmore North by-election, 4 November 1968
Party	Candidate	Votes	%	±%
Conservative	D. E. Wells	1467		
Liberal	J. H. Paterson	514		
Labour	B. B. Myers	425		
Communist	R. A. Ward	59		
Union Movement	F. E. Lee	25		
Turnout			19.1%	

Harrow-on-the-Hill & Greenhill by-election, 3 July 1969
Party	Candidate	Votes	%	±%
Conservative	J. R. Keen	799		
Liberal	R. S. Montgomerie	445		
Labour	A. J. Lovell	294		
Turnout			20.5%	

Pinner South by-election, 8 October 1969
Party	Candidate	Votes	%	±%
Conservative	M. A. Murphy	1865		
Liberal	W. R. Westaway	591		
Labour	B. C. Perigoe	267		
Union Movement	K. M. Thompson	76		
Turnout			22.0%	

Kenton by-election, 5 February 1970
Party	Candidate	Votes	%	±%
Conservative	J. A. Campbell	1402		
Liberal	J. E. H. Davies	773		
Labour	D. J. R. Howard	350		
Turnout			27.3%	

Headstone by-election, 8 October 1970
Party	Candidate	Votes	%	±%
Conservative	W. M. Buckland	1187		
Liberal	G. O. Abbott	1118		
Labour	D. J. R. Howard	305		
Turnout			31.7%	

=== 1971-1974 ===
Wealdstone North by-election, 8 July 1971
Party	Candidate	Votes	%	±%
Labour	A. H. Tidmarsh	2,615		
Conservative	C. A. Bednell	740		
Liberal	J. S. W. Branch	188		
Union Movement	D. J. Wilson	53		
Turnout			33.9%	

Belmont by-election, 13 July 1972
Party	Candidate	Votes	%	±%
Conservative	B. J. Simmonds	1,192		
Labour	G. W. Temple	888		
Independent	R. S. Sullivan	681		
Liberal	A. T. Ketteringham	383		
National Front	R. Franklin	216		
Harrow Youth Movement	R. N. S. Keidan	67		
Ind. Conservative	E. J. O. Hixon	22		
Turnout			41.5%	

Harrow-on-the-Hill & Greenhill by-election, 12 July 1973
Party	Candidate	Votes	%	±%
Conservative	N. J. Cervantes-Watson	976		
Labour	A. K. Toms	777		
Liberal	M. E. Wakefield	364		
Action Party	K. M. Thompson	203		
Turnout			29.9%	

Kenton by-election, 12 July 1973
Party	Candidate	Votes	%	±%
Conservative	A. B. C. Turner	1,351		
Labour	S. L. Soskin	1,044		
Liberal	R. S. Montgomerie	804		
National Front	C. A. Byrne	360		
Independent	R. S. Sullivan	270		
Turnout			41.2%	

Stanmore South by-election, 6 December 1973
Party	Candidate	Votes	%	±%
Labour	A. Bradshaw	1,270		
Conservative	M. R. Crick	520		
Liberal	P. N. P. Williams	364		
National Front	C. A. Byrne	259		
Turnout			31.0%	

=== 1974-1978 ===
Stanmore South by-election, 10 December 1975
Party	Candidate	Votes	%	±%
Labour	William J. Short	853		
Conservative	William D. Harris	769		
Liberal	Peter N. P. Williams	598		
National Front	Peter Orsmond	225		
Turnout			31.2	

Headstone by-election, 31 March 1977
Party	Candidate	Votes	%	±%
Conservative	Frank E. Weare	1,850		
Liberal	Clifford S. Thomas	999		
Labour	Alexander J. Bruce	595		
National Front	Geoffrey W. Spratt	215		
Turnout			44.6	

=== 1990-1994 ===
Wemborough by-election, 7 November 1991
Party	Candidate	Votes	%	±%
Liberal Democrats	Laurence J. Cox	1,351	46.7	
Conservative	Robert E. Goodman	1,176	40.7	
Labour	Jack Gilbert	363	12.6	
Turnout			40.4	
Liberal Democrats gain from Conservative		Swing		

The by-election was called following the resignation of Cllr Richard Denney.

Pinner West by-election, 21 January 1993
Party	Candidate	Votes	%	±%
Conservative	Mark A. Mallon	1,421	45.2	
Liberal Democrats	Graham D. Finch	1,202	38.2	
Labour	Susan C. Thomason	467	14.9	
Liberal	Donald O. Bruce	53	1.7	
Turnout			45.2	
Conservative hold		Swing		

The by-election was called following the death of Cllr Charles Green.

Canons by-election, 24 June 1993
Party	Candidate	Votes	%	±%
Conservative	Garry C. Leon	1,049	45.8	
Liberal Democrats	Ronald D. Warshaw	962	42.0	
Labour	Charles E. Blake	279	12.2	
Turnout			37.3	
Conservative hold		Swing		

The by-election was called following the resignation of Cllr Ronald Grant.

Harrow Weald by-election, 24 June 1993
Party	Candidate	Votes	%	±%
Liberal Democrats	Brian G. T. Williams	1,916	65.0	
Conservative	Thomas G. Brown	562	19.1	
Labour	Archie T. Foulds	470	15.9	
Turnout			40.1	
Liberal Democrats hold		Swing		

The by-election was called following the resignation of Cllr Howard Cooper.

Greenhill by-election, 13 October 1993
Party	Candidate	Votes	%	±%
Lib Dem Focus Team	Maureen De Beer	1,092	45.6	
Labour	Jeffrey A. Anderson	747	31.2	
Conservative	Anthony H. Seymour	555	23.2	
Turnout			41.7	
Lib Dem Focus Team gain from Conservative		Swing		

The by-election was called following the death of Cllr Leslie Nixon.

=== 1994-1998 ===
Headstone South by-election, 16 February 1995
Party	Candidate	Votes	%	±%
Liberal Democrats	Clifford S. Thomas	1,282		
Labour	Archie T. Foulds	1,009		
Conservative	John B. Rennie	268		
Independent	Roy Edey	36		
Independent	Colin R. P. Manton	37		
Turnout				
Liberal Democrats hold		Swing		

The by-election was called following the resignation of Cllr Derek Wiseman.

Harrow Weald by-election, 13 July 1995
Party	Candidate	Votes	%	±%
Liberal Democrats	Robert L. Pinkus	1,444		
Labour	Colin S. Crouch	719		
Conservative	Thomas G. Brown	562		
Turnout				
Liberal Democrats hold		Swing		

The by-election was called following the resignation of Cllr Brian Williams.

Ridgeway by-election, 11 January 1996
Party	Candidate	Votes	%	±%
Liberal Democrats	Adrien P. Smith	1,071		
Conservative	Leonard G. C. Harsant	808		
Labour	Brian E. Gate	682		
Turnout				
Liberal Democrats hold		Swing		

The by-election was called following the resignation of Cllr Norah Murphy.

Wealdstone by-election, 17 July 1997
Party	Candidate	Votes	%	±%
Labour	Cyril B. Harrison	1,036		
Conservative	Jeremy S. Zeid	335		
Liberal Democrats	Stanley Sheinwald	229		
Green	David P. P. Edler	54		
Turnout				
Labour hold		Swing		

The by-election was called following the resignation of Cllr Gareth Thomas.

Ridgeway by-election, 11 September 1997
Party	Candidate	Votes	%	±%
Labour	Brian E. Gate	827		
Liberal Democrats	Edward P. Tiley	694		
Conservative	Leonard G. C. Harsant	690		
Independent	Marjorie S. Warwick	44		
Turnout				
Labour gain from Liberal Democrats		Swing		

The by-election was called following the resignation of Cllr Andrew Wiseman.

Roxeth by-election, 11 September 1997
Party	Candidate	Votes	%	±%
Labour	Jeremy J. Miles	1,045		
Independent Resident	Charles E. M. Cox	1,024		
Conservative	Mohammad A. Kaiseriman	165		
Turnout				
Labour gain from Independent Resident		Swing		

The by-election was called following the death of Cllr Alan Hamlin.

Stanmore South by-election, 9 October 1997
Party	Candidate	Votes	%	±%
Labour	Keith Burchell	1,476		
Conservative	Henry S. Venour	360		
Liberal Democrats	Jaydeep K. Patel	295		
Socialist Labour	Jack Gilbert	112		
Turnout				
Labour hold		Swing		

The by-election was called following the resignation of Cllr Tony McNulty.

=== 1998-2002 ===
Stanmore South by-election, 18 February 1999
Party	Candidate	Votes	%	±%
Labour	Margaret A. Davine	1,425	56.8	−3.8
Conservative	Gary S. Hughes	696	27.7	+3.5
Liberal Democrats	David B. Sandford	388	15.5	+0.4
Majority		729	29.1	
Turnout		2,509	26.7	
Labour hold		Swing		

The by-election was called following the death of Cllr Robert Lawrence.

Wealdstone by-election, 23 May 2000
Party	Candidate	Votes	%	±%
Labour	Alan G. Blann	988	55.8	−10.5
Liberal Democrats	Brian K. Campbell	440	24.8	+10.3
Conservative	Nisam S. Butt	343	19.4	+2.9
Majority		548	31.0	
Turnout		1,771	26.1	
Labour hold		Swing		

The by-election was called following the death of Cllr Ann Swaine.

Pinner by-election, 12 July 2001
Party	Candidate	Votes	%	±%
Conservative	Paul S. Osborn	1,062	57.7	−4.3
Labour	Joseph T. Lilley	478	26.0	+2.1
Liberal Democrats	Veronica M. Chamberlain	250	13.6	−0.5
Independent	Herbert W. Crossman	51	2.8	+2.8
Majority		584	31.7	
Turnout		1,841	23.8	
Conservative hold		Swing		

The by-election was called following the death of Cllr Antony Cocksedge.

=== 2002-2006 ===
There were no by-elections.

=== 2006-2010 ===
Harrow Weald by-election, 24 August 2006
Party	Candidate	Votes	%	±%
Liberal Democrats	Paul E. Scott	1,288	46.9	+12.0
Conservative	Brian R. Jones	1,088	39.6	−6.1
Labour	Howard S. Bluston	295	10.7	−8.7
Green	Sarah A. Kersey	74	2.7	+2.7
Majority		200	7.3	
Turnout		2,745	33.5	
Liberal Democrats gain from Conservative		Swing		

The by-election was called following the death of Cllr John Anderson.

Canons by-election, 13 December 2007
Party	Candidate	Votes	%	±%
Conservative	Musarrat H. Akhtar	1,208	56.7	−11.1
Labour	Richard Harrod	389	18.3	−0.1
Liberal Democrats	Anne D. Diamond	296	13.9	+0.1
Independent	Marcello Borgese	182	8.5	+8.5
BNP	Howard J. Studley	56	2.6	+2.6
Majority		819	38.4	
Turnout		2,131	24.0	
Conservative hold		Swing		

The by-election was called following the death of Cllr Janet Cowan.

Marlborough by-election, 13 March 2008
Party	Candidate	Votes	%	±%
Labour	Krishna James	972	41.4	−2.1
Liberal Democrats	Peter D. J. Budden	628	26.7	+3.1
Conservative	Kamaljit S. Chana	507	21.6	−11.3
BNP	Howard J. Studley	97	4.1	+4.1
Independent	Herbert W. Crossman	74	3.2	+3.2
Green	Antony F. Rablen	71	3.0	+3.0
Majority		344	14.4	
Turnout		2,349	29.6	
Labour hold		Swing		

The by-election was called following the death of Cllr Dhirajlal Lavingia.

=== 2010-2014 ===
Canons by-election, 2 June 2011
Party	Candidate	Votes	%	±%
Conservative	Amir Moshenson	1495		
Labour	Nitin Parekh	774		
Liberal Democrats	Darren S. Diamond	236		
Turnout			26.1%	
Conservative hold		Swing		

The by-election was called following the death of Cllr John Cowan.

Stanmore Park by-election, 28 July 2011
Party	Candidate	Votes	%	±%
Conservative	Marilyn J. Ashton	1395		
Labour	Niraj Dattani	509		
Independent	Eric Silver	299		
Liberal Democrats	Sylvia Warshaw	98		
Green	Linda C. Robinson	53		
UKIP	Herbert Crossman	48		
Turnout			27.6%	
Conservative hold		Swing		

The by-election was called following the resignation of Cllr Mark Versallion.

West Harrow by-election, 21 February 2013
Party	Candidate	Votes	%	±%
Labour	Christine Robson	1,042	47.6	+7.2
Conservative	Julia Merison	761	34.7	−1.3
UKIP	Jeremy Zeid	171	7.8	+6.0
Green	Rowan Langley	96	4.4	+4.4
Liberal Democrats	Prakash Nandhra	68	3.1	−16.0
Independent	Herbert Crossman	53	2.4	+2.4
Majority		281	12.8	+8.8
Turnout		2,191	28.5	−40.3
Labour hold		Swing	4.3%	

The by-election was called following the resignation of Cllr Brian Gate.

Harrow-on-the-Hill by-election, 7 November 2013
Party	Candidate	Votes	%	±%
Labour	Glen Hearnden	991	38.9	+2.1
Conservative	Stephen Lewis	836	32.8	−2.4
Independent	Eileen Kinnear	308	12.1	+5.0
Harrow First	Gajan Idaikkadar	173	6.8	+6.8
UKIP	Jeremy Zeid	168	6.6	+6.6
Liberal Democrats	Gaye Branch	70	2.7	−10.2
Majority		155	6.1	+4.5
Turnout		2,546	29.2	−31.4
Labour hold		Swing	2.3%	

The by-election was called following the resignation of Cllr Ann Gate.

=== 2014-2018 ===
Roxbourne by-election, 9 March 2017
Party	Candidate	Votes	%	±%
Labour	Maxine Henson	1,554	62.7	▲13.5
Conservative	Annabel Singh	533	21.5	▲0.1
Liberal Democrats	Marshel Amutharasan	240	9.6	▲0.4
UKIP	Herbert Crossman	148	6.0	▲6.0
Turnout		2,475	26.6	
Labour hold		Swing		

The by-election was caused by the death of Cllr Bob Currie

Kenton East by-election, 20 April 2017
Party	Candidate	Votes	%	±%
Conservative	Nitesh Hirani	1,585	52.3	▲19.5
Labour	Nishit Patel	1,328	43.8	▼1.3
Liberal Democrats	Annabel Croft	65	2.1	▲2.1
UKIP	Herbert Crossman	54	1.8	▼9.6
Turnout		3,032	36.7	
Conservative gain from Labour		Swing		

The by-election was caused by the death of Cllr Mitzi Green

=== 2018-2022 ===
Pinner South by-election, 14 October 2021
Party	Candidate	Votes	%	±%
Conservative	Hitesh Karia	1,392	60.5	▲1.6
Liberal Democrats	Sanjay Karia	390	16.9	▲2.1
Labour	Brahma Mohanty	331	14.4	▼11.9
Green	Alexander Lee	188	8.2	▲8.2
Majority		1,002	43.5	
Turnout		2,301		
Conservative hold		Swing		

The by-election was caused by the death of Cllr Chris Mote

== Ward Map 2002-2022 ==
A map showing the wards of Harrow between 2002 and 2022.
