= Uma Kumaran =

British politician

Uma Kumaran MP
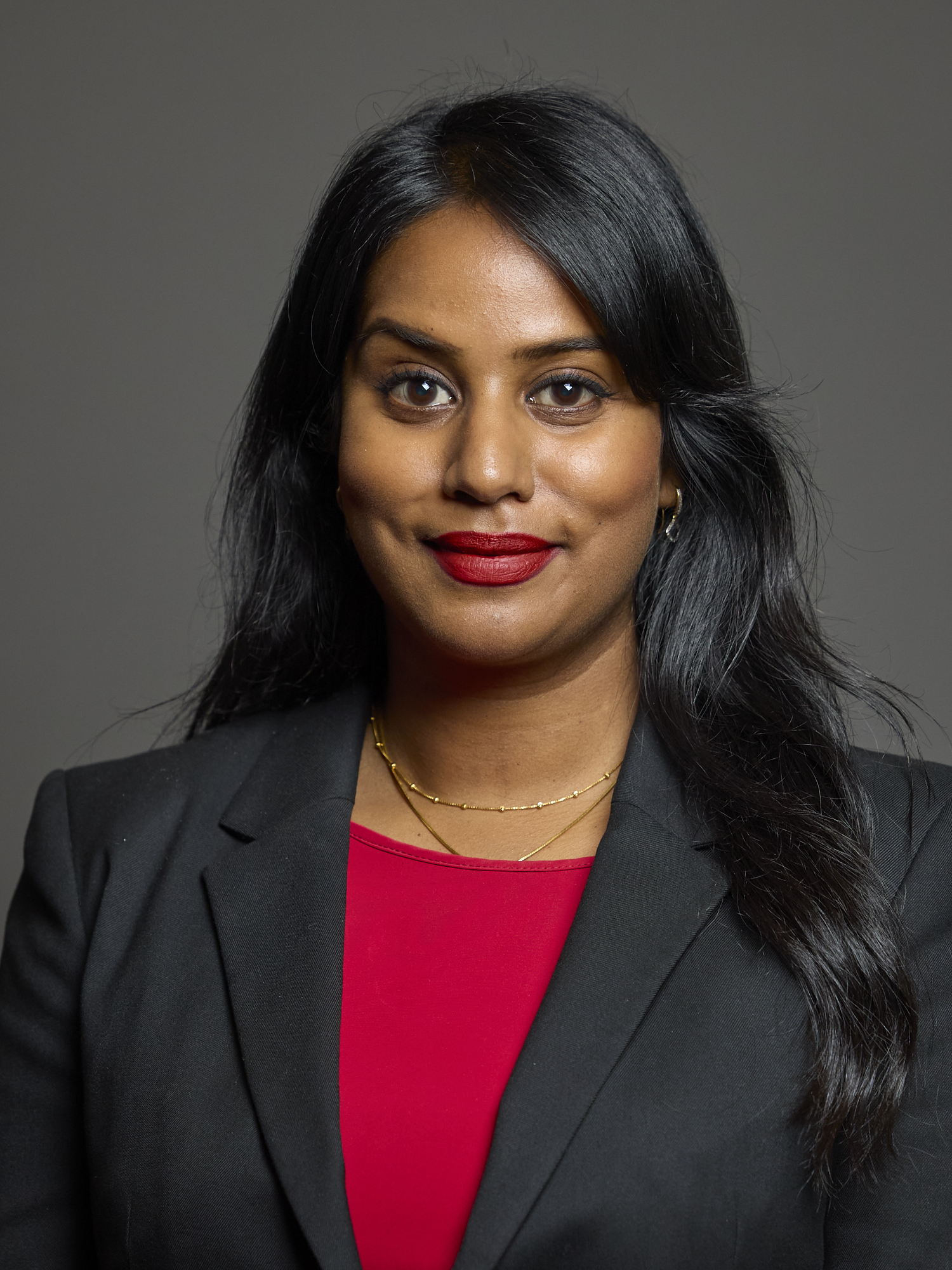
- Official portrait, 2024

Parliamentary Under-Secretary of State for Overseas Territories, Caribbean, Global Tech and AI
- Incumbent
- Assumed office 22 July 2026
- Prime Minister: Andy Burnham
- Preceded by: Stephen Doughty (Overseas Territories); Chris Elmore (Caribbean)

Assistant Government Whip
- Incumbent
- Assumed office 22 July 2026
- Prime Minister: Andy Burnham

Member of Parliament
- Incumbent
- Assumed office 4 July 2024
- Constituency: Stratford and Bow
- Majority: 11,634 (26.8%)

Personal details
- Born: London, England
- Party: Labour
- Education: Queen Mary University of London
- Website: www.umakumaran.co.uk

Uma Kumaran (Tamil: உமா குமரன்) is a British politician who currently serves as Parliamentary Under-Secretary of State for Overseas Territories and Caribbean. A member of the Labour Party, she has been Member of Parliament (MP) for Stratford and Bow since 2024.

== Early life ==
Kumaran was born in East London to Sri Lankan Tamil refugees. Her parents, who had fled the Sri Lankan Civil War, were assisted by Labour Party MP Jeremy Corbyn in their immigration case. The family later moved to Harrow, where Kumaran was educated at Newton Farm Nursery, Infant and Junior School, Bentley Wood High School and St Dominic's Sixth Form College. She has a Bachelor of Arts degree in politics and a Master of Science degree in public policy from Queen Mary University of London.

== Career ==
Kumaran worked for NHS Professionals between December 2007 and January 2009. She was a parliamentary researcher and caseworker for Labour MP Dawn Butler between March 2009 and August 2010. She worked for the Labour Group on Islington Council from September 2010 to December 2014. She was senior campaign adviser for Sadiq Khan (May 2015 to October 2015) and a political adviser at the Local Government Association (October 2015 to November 2017). She then served as a senior adviser to Mayor of London Sadiq Khan from November 2017 to August 2020. Kumaran was deputy director of parliamentary affairs for Labour leader Keir Starmer from September 2020 to March 2022 where she was a part of Starmer's Prime Minister's Questions and Shadow Cabinet Relations team. She was director of diplomatic and international relations for C40 Cities Climate Leadership Group from April 2022 to May 2024.

Kumaran contested 2010 local elections in the London Borough of Harrow as one of the Labour Party candidates in the three-member Pinner South Ward but was not elected. In November 2013, Kumaran was selected by the Labour Party to be its candidate in Harrow East. During the 2015 general election campaign, she and the Liberal Democrat candidate were attacked by Dharma Sewa Purvapaksha, an organisation founded by Conservative Party member Mukesh Naker, for their parties' support in 2013 for legislation to outlaw caste discrimination. Kumaran's Conservative opponent Bob Blackman described the anti-discrimination legislation as "divisive and much hated". At the election, Kumaran was defeated by Blackman. She did not contest the 2017 general election, citing the impact on her family and friends that she claimed was a result of communal politics employed by Conservative MP Bob Blackman during the 2015 election campaign in Harrow East. In May 2024, Kumaran was selected to be the Labour Party's candidate in the newly created constituency of Stratford and Bow. At the election, she was elected with a majority of 11,634. She was the first person of Tamil heritage elected to the UK Parliament.

Kumaran was elected as a member of the Foreign Affairs Select Committee in October 2024. In December 2024, she was also appointed by the Prime Minister to the United Kingdom delegation to the UK-EU Parliamentary Partnership Assembly. She has also sat on the Great British Energy Bill Committee and Employment Rights Bill Committee.

In July 2026 Kumaran was appointed Parliamentary Under-Secretary of State in the Foreign, Commonwealth and Development Office and as an Assistant Whip in the government of new Prime Minister Andy Burnham. She has responsibility for Overseas Territories, the Caribbean, global technology and AI, violence against women and girls and departmental operations.

== Personal life ==
Kumaran is married to political consultant Jacob Tilley. She has spoken publicly about the impact of religiously divisive political campaigning on her family during her early career.

== Electoral history ==
Electoral history of Uma Kumaran
Election	Constituency	Party	Votes	Result
2010 local	Harrow - Pinner South Ward	Labour Party	1,535	Not elected
2015 general	Harrow East	Labour Party	19,911	Not elected
2024 general	Stratford and Bow	Labour Party	19,145	Elected
