= 2002 Harrow London Borough Council election =

2002 Harrow London Borough Council Election
← 1998	2 May 2002	2006 →

All 63 council seats contested
	First party	Second party	Third party
Party	Labour	Conservative	Liberal Democrats
Seats before	32	20	9
Seats after	31	29	3
Seat change	▼1	▲9	▼6
- Map of the results of the 2002 Harrow council election. Conservatives in blue, Labour in red and Liberal Democrats in yellow.

Elections for Harrow London Borough Council in London were held on 2 May 2002. It was a part of the wider 2002 London local elections. The Conservatives won 50.4% of the vote in the borough. The turnout was 31.5%.

== Result summary ==
Harrow local election result 2002
Party	Seats	Net change	Votes%	Votes
Conservative	31	▲9	50.4%	69,531
Labour	29	▼1	43.7%	59,852
Liberal Democrats	9	▼6	2.3%	3168
Green	0	Steady	0.5%	768
Others	0	Steady	2.5%	3432
Total	69	N/A	100%	136,751
Source:London Councils, London Datastore

The nominations of sixty Liberal Democrat candidates were rejected by the Returning Officer due to changes brought in by the Registration of Political Parties Act 1998, namely the use of the description "Liberal Democrat Focus Team" when the authorisation certificate issued by their party was for "Liberal Democrats"; this rejection was upheld after a legal challenge. The candidates in the Harrow Weald ward had used "Liberal Democrats" and were not excluded.

== Ward results ==
=== Belmont ===
Belmont
Party	Candidate	Votes	%
Conservative	David Ashton	1,459	22.5
Conservative	Adrian Pinkus	1,389	21.5
Conservative	Manjibhai Kara	1,383	21.4
Labour	Kashmira Shah	745	11.5
Labour	Pauline Egan	744	11.5
Labour	Nigel Green	737	11.4
Total votes		6,457	100
Turnout			31.0

=== Canons ===
Canons
Party	Candidate	Votes	%
Conservative	Janet Cowan	1,832	25.1
Conservative	John Cowan	1,820	24.9
Conservative	Richard Romain	1,750	23.9
Labour	Eileen McNulty	656	8.9
Labour	Richard Legate	628	8.6
Labour	Colin Gray	608	8.3
Total votes		7,294	100
Turnout			31.6

=== Edgware ===
Edgware
Party	Candidate	Votes	%
Labour	Keith Burchell	1,164	23.9
Labour	Margaret Davine	1,104	22.6
Labour	Adam Lent	1,024	21.0
Conservative	Richard	793	16.2
Conservative	Surendra Patel	771	15.8
Total votes		4,869	100
Turnout			29.2

=== Greenhill ===
Greenhill
Party	Candidate	Votes	%
Labour	Michael Kinsey	908	16.7
Labour	Howard Bluston	900	16.6
Labour	Rajeshri Shah	858	15.8
Conservative	John Anderson	838	15.4
Conservative	Jonathan Leese	798	14.7
Conservative	Golam Chowdhury	767	14.1
Green	Colin Newman	350	6.4
Total votes		5,419	100
Turnout			27.6

=== Harrow-on-the-Hill ===
Harrow-On-The-Hill
Party	Candidate	Votes	%
Conservative	Mark Versallion	1,377	19.2
Conservative	Eileen M Kinnear	1,323	18.5
Conservative	Frederick Billson	1,287	18.0
Labour	Huw Davies	1,086	15.2
Labour	Christopher Taggart	1,038	14.5
Labour	Colin Gray	1,025	14.3
Total votes		7,136	100
Turnout			34.6

=== Harrow Weald ===
Harrow Weald
Party	Candidate	Votes	%
Liberal Democrats	Patricia Lyne	1,139	14.8
Liberal Democrats	John Branch	1,029	13.3
Liberal Democrats	Stephen Thornton	1,000	13.0
Conservative	Anthony Ferrari	929	12.0
Conservative	Jeanette Strode	915	11.9
Conservative	Sophie Georgiou-Hall	872	11.3
Labour	Colin S Crouch	621	8.0
Labour	Narendrakumar Dav	611	7.9
Labour	James Price	575	7.4
Total votes		7,691	100
Turnout			34.3

=== Hatch End ===
Hatch End
Party	Candidate	Votes	%
Conservative	Mary John	1,641	24.3
Conservative	Adrian Knowles	1,598	23.6
Conservative	Jean Lammiman	1,585	23.4
Labour	Susan Anderson	663	9.8
Labour	John Solomon	9.4	14.5
Labour	Patricia Rogers	628	9.3
Total votes		6,750	100
Turnout			30.8

=== Headstone North ===
Headstone North
Party	Candidate	Votes	%
Conservative	Janet Mote	1,752	22.3
Conservative	Anthony Seymour	1,710	21.7
Conservative	Eric Silver	1,698	21.6
Labour	John Moore	910	11.5
Labour	Krishnapillai Suresh	808	10.2
Labour	Sivalingam Thayaparan	722	9.1
Independent	Yasmin Mirza	254	3.2
Total votes		7,854	100
Turnout			38.1

=== Headstone South ===
Headstone South
Party	Candidate	Votes	%
Labour	William Stephenson	1,275	20.3
Labour	Anne Whitehead	1,218	19.4
Labour	Asad Omar	1,187	18.9
Conservative	Susan Mary Hall	743	11.8
Conservative	Stephen Dixon	730	11.6
Conservative	Ian Moore	685	10.9
Green	Jennifer Hunt	418	6.6
Total votes		6,256	100
Turnout			31.2

=== Kenton East ===
Kenton East
Party	Candidate	Votes	%
Labour	Navin Shah	1,338	21.7
Labour	Archie Foulds	1,299	20.3
Labour	Albert Toms	1,229	19.2
Conservative	Anjana Patel	911	14.2
Conservative	Keith Harwood	809	12.6
Conservative	Keronn Patels	685	10.7
Total votes		6,380	100
Turnout			32.2

=== Kenton West ===
Kenton West
Party	Candidate	Votes	%
Conservative	Vina Mithani	1,137	17.1
Labour	Mrinal Choudhury	1,129	17.0
Labour	Sanja Dighé	1,113	16.7
Labour	Raymond Frogley	1,105	16.6
Conservative	Celia Pemberton	1,084	16.3
Conservative	Jeremy Zeid	1,069	16.1
Total votes		6,637	100
Turnout			30.9

=== Marlborough ===
Marlborough
Party	Candidate	Votes	%
Labour	Ann Groves	1,261	21.7
Labour	Dhirajlal Lavingia	1,189	20.3
Labour	Phillip O'Dell	1,178	19.2
Conservative	Joseph Grenfell	640	14.2
Conservative	Jonathan Lemon	599	12.6
Conservative	Paul Stanley	594	10.7
Total votes		5,461	100
Turnout			27.5

=== Pinner ===
Pinner
Party	Candidate	Votes	%
Conservative	Myra Michael	1,729	25.3
Conservative	Mavis Champagnie	1,715	25.1
Conservative	Paul Osborn	1,678	24.6
Labour	Timothy Oelman	579	8.4
Labour	Ann Gate	562	8.2
Labour	Jeffrey Gallant	556	8.1
Total votes		6,819	100
Turnout			31.9

=== Pinner South ===
Pinner South
Party	Candidate	Votes	%
Conservative	Charles Mote	1,812	23.1
Conservative	Gordon Williams	1,766	22.5
Conservative	John Nickolay	1,734	22.1
Labour	Joseph Lilley	897	11.4
Labour	Asoke Dutta	818	10.4
Labour	Ernest Selby	795	10.1
Total votes		7,822	100
Turnout			36.2

=== Queensbury ===
Queensbury
Party	Candidate	Votes	%
Labour	Elizabeth Asante-Twumasi	1,026	18.2
Labour	Keekira Thammaiah	977	17.3
Labour	Nizam Ismail	975	17.3
Conservative	Frank Budden	905	16.0
Conservative	Kumudben Patel	889	15.7
Conservative	Bimal Chudasama	858	15.2
Total votes		5,630	100
Turnout			28.2

=== Rayners Lane ===
Rayners Lane
Party	Candidate	Votes	%
Conservative	Lily Nickolay	1,199	15.8
Conservative	Raymond Arnold	1,193	15.7
Conservative	Clive Harriss	1,156	15.2
Labour	Paul Levy	1,102	14.5
Labour	Sasikala Suresh	1,100	14.5
Labour	Ashish Vithaldas	1,059	14.0
Independent	Arthur Petchey	271	3.5
Independent	Simon Gearhart	251	3.3
Independent	Derek Whaley	231	3.0
Total votes		7,562	100
Turnout			35.9

=== Roxbourne ===
Roxbourne
Party	Candidate	Votes	%
Labour	Robert Currie	1,176	23.2
Labour	Manoharan Dharmarajah	1,128	22.3
Labour	Mark Ingram	1,055	20.8
Conservative	Michael Goddard	579	11.4
Conservative	Peter Hardy	565	11.1
Conservative	Julia Merison	546	10.8
Total votes		5,049	100
Turnout			25.3

=== Roxeth ===
Roxeth
Party	Candidate	Votes	%
Labour	Jeremy Miles	1,187	20.5
Labour	Thayapara Idaikkadar	1,094	18.9
Labour	Radhikaranjan Ray	1,060	18.3
Independent	William Simpson	852	14.7
Independent	Herbert Crossman	823	14.2
Independent	Khalid Mahmood	750	13.0
Total votes		5,766	100
Turnout			28.9

=== Stanmore Park ===
Stanmore Park
Party	Candidate	Votes	%
Conservative	Marilyn Ashton	1,806	26.9
Conservative	Camilla Bath	1,800	26.8
Conservative	Christine Bednell	1,767	26.3
Labour	Charles Blake	500	7.4
Labour	Kathleen Kurji	428	6.4
Labour	Dino Ortenzi	393	5.8
Total votes		6,694	100
Turnout			31.9

=== Wealdstone ===
Wealdstone
Party	Candidate	Votes	%
Labour	Alan Blann	1,334	23.7
Labour	Cyril Harrison	1,323	23.5
Labour	Marie-Louise Nolan	1,286	22.9
Conservative	Christine Thomas	564	10.0
Conservative	John Hall	559	11.1
Conservative	Stewart Bolasco	540	9.6
Total votes		5,606	100
Turnout			30.4

=== West Harrow ===
West Harrow
Party	Candidate	Votes	%
Labour	Brian Gate	1,249	18.3
Labour	Mitzi Green	1,172	17.1
Conservative	Anjana Patel	1,161	17.0
Labour	Norman Stillerman	1,102	16.1
Conservative	Leonard Harsant	1,079	15.8
Conservative	John Rennie	1,062	15.5
Total votes		6,825	100
Turnout			34.2
