= 1964 Harrow London Borough Council election =

The 1964 Harrow Council election took place on 7 May 1964 to elect members of Harrow London Borough Council in London, England. The entire council was up for election and the Conservative Party gained overall control of the council.

== Background ==
These elections were the first to the newly formed borough. Previously elections had taken place in the Municipal Borough of Harrow. This borough formed the new London Borough of Harrow by the London Government Act 1963.

A total of 168 candidates stood in the election for the 56 seats being contested across 15 wards. These included a full slate from the Conservative and Labour parties, while the Liberals stood 50 candidates. Other candidates included 6 from the Communist party. There were 7 three-seat wards, 5 four-seat wards and 3 five-seat wards.

This election had aldermen as well as directly elected councillors. The Conservatives got 6 aldermen and Labour 3.

The Council was elected in 1964 as a "shadow authority" but did not start operations until 1 April 1965.

== Election result ==
The results saw the Conservatives gain the new council with a majority of 16 after winning 36 of the 56 seats. Overall turnout in the election was 43.0%. This turnout included 793 postal votes.

== Ward results ==
Belmont (3)
Party	Candidate	Votes	%	±%
Conservative	Edward John Harkett	1,899		
Conservative	Edward George Buckle	1,898		
Conservative	George Colborne Hill	1,897		
Labour	Walter F Griffin	728		
Labour	K D Reeves	723		
Labour	R G Taylor	647		
Liberal	Thomas R Burke	474		
Liberal	H J Sergeant	433		
Liberal	Cyril Alfred B Aldridge	429		
Turnout		3,087	37.2	
Conservative win (new seat)				
Conservative win (new seat)				
Conservative win (new seat)				

Harrow Weald (4)
Party	Candidate	Votes	%	±%
Labour	Colin George V Barson	2,754		
Labour	Archibald James Eckert	2,690		
Labour	Bernard M Cohen	2,634		
Labour	D J Sleigh	2,505		
Conservative	James D Charter	1,805		
Conservative	Mrs V Charter	1,736		
Conservative	Mrs M Apollo	1,725		
Conservative	J E Palmer	1,619		
Liberal	Ronald Everitt	703		
Liberal	H C Cooper	577		
Liberal	Terence I Jones	576		
Liberal	R J E Owen	576		
Communist	H J Tuttle	121		
Turnout		5,092	51.7	
Labour win (new seat)				
Labour win (new seat)				
Labour win (new seat)				
Labour win (new seat)				

Harrow-on-the-Hill & Greenhill (3)
Party	Candidate	Votes	%	±%
Conservative	William E Jones	1,438		
Conservative	Charles Edward Stenhouse	1,423		
Conservative	W E N Wormald	1,400		
Labour	J R Green	675		
Labour	G E Clayton	648		
Labour	R F Short	612		
Liberal	F A Farmer	403		
Liberal	Mrs M Sorrell	367		
Liberal	R S Montgomerie	357		
Turnout		2,491	32.9	
Conservative win (new seat)				
Conservative win (new seat)				
Conservative win (new seat)				

Headstone (3)
Party	Candidate	Votes	%	±%
Conservative	Owen George Collins	1,974		
Conservative	Harold Richard Sheldrake	1,940		
Conservative	William Archibald Tackley	1,897		
Liberal	Geoffrey Owen Abbott	1,004		
Liberal	Mrs Audrey E Beauchamp	906		
Liberal	Richard J Denney	797		
Labour	Joseph T M Blackman	540		
Labour	F D Flower	535		
Labour	A H Bolton	505		
Turnout		3,397	44.1	
Conservative win (new seat)				
Conservative win (new seat)				
Conservative win (new seat)				

Kenton (4)
Party	Candidate	Votes	%	±%
Conservative	Anthony C Cocksedge	2,517		
Conservative	Mrs Marie Martha H E Haslam	2,376		
Conservative	Eric William Harry Feakins	2,240		
Conservative	J D Statham	2,214		
Liberal	Dennis Frederick Joyner	1,925		
Liberal	Dr Ivan M Roitt	1,835		
Liberal	H W Chapman	1,795		
Liberal	E W Husband	1,764		
Labour	M M Keir	985		
Labour	Mrs A Beasley	973		
Labour	M A Mills	958		
Labour	R C Barson	956		
Turnout		5,164	54.4	
Conservative win (new seat)				
Conservative win (new seat)				
Conservative win (new seat)				
Conservative win (new seat)				

Pinner North & Hatch End (5)
Party	Candidate	Votes	%	±%
Conservative	Cyril G Ellement	4,109		
Conservative	Mrs Isobel Muriel Potts	4,048		
Conservative	Harold Trevor Mote	4,014		
Conservative	M D Hartley-Hill	3,972		
Conservative	N Graham Hines	3,956		
Liberal	Edwin J H Francis	916		
Liberal	B Domb	808		
Liberal	C J James	799		
Liberal	H Young	795		
Liberal	Klaus W Eliel	764		
Labour	Peter Antony Fletcher	520		
Labour	Mrs D M Hinton	512		
Labour	F W Hinton	495		
Labour	C B King	483		
Labour	Mrs M C B Morley	480		
Turnout		5,405	41.1	
Conservative win (new seat)				
Conservative win (new seat)				
Conservative win (new seat)				
Conservative win (new seat)				
Conservative win (new seat)				

Pinner South (5)
Party	Candidate	Votes	%	±%
Conservative	Mrs D A Nott-Cock	3,601		
Conservative	Alfred George Sellers	3,591		
Conservative	Owen W N Cock	3,585		
Conservative	William Sydney Clack	3,571		
Conservative	Charles Ernest Jordan	3,543		
Liberal	W R Westaway	1,004		
Liberal	W H D Little	990		
Liberal	G R Davis	974		
Liberal	T W Kettle	956		
Liberal	J S Anthony	953		
Labour	J L Clark	947		
Labour	Colin Litchfield	802		
Labour	Jeremy P Lansdell	788		
Labour	Mrs A M Littlehales	759		
Labour	G A Tempest	753		
Turnout		5,447	42.8	
Conservative win (new seat)				
Conservative win (new seat)				
Conservative win (new seat)				
Conservative win (new seat)				
Conservative win (new seat)				

Queensbury (3)
Party	Candidate	Votes	%	±%
Labour	Mrs Eva E Davies	2,098		
Labour	R Bailey	2,042		
Labour	Henry I Harris	2,020		
Conservative	Michael A Carmody	1,116		
Conservative	Frederick L Le Franc	1,064		
Conservative	Miss N Harker	1,044		
Communist	James P Roche	129		
Turnout		3,283	37.3	
Labour win (new seat)				
Labour win (new seat)				
Labour win (new seat)				

Roxbourne (3)
Party	Candidate	Votes	%	±%
Labour	Glyn Davies	1,703		
Labour	A H Tidmarsh	1,676		
Conservative	J W Nickolay	1,667		
Labour	P W Underwood	1,661		
Conservative	Harold Grainger	1,645		
Conservative	A E Thomas	1,630		
Liberal	Mrs Eileen J Colledge	1,292		
Liberal	Arthur A Fawthrop	1,287		
Liberal	Edgar G Wilmott	1,285		
Turnout		4,668	51.6	
Labour win (new seat)				
Labour win (new seat)				
Conservative win (new seat)				

Roxeth (4)
Party	Candidate	Votes	%	±%
Labour	John S Campbell	2,233		
Labour	Mrs Doris I Edwards	2,160		
Labour	A R Judge	2,130		
Labour	I W Mackay	2,061		
Conservative	L D Bowman	1,949		
Conservative	Miss Cherisy P Cawood	1,939		
Conservative	E R Chalker	1,918		
Conservative	E K Cornes	1,810		
Liberal	John C Connolly	765		
Liberal	Mrs L A O Harrison	694		
Liberal	A Forrest	668		
Liberal	M Sewell-Rutter	624		
Communist	R R C Morris	123		
Turnout		4,843	45.2	
Labour win (new seat)				
Labour win (new seat)				
Labour win (new seat)				
Labour win (new seat)				

Stanmore North (5)
Party	Candidate	Votes	%	±%
Conservative	Gerald Francis Gibbons	2,741		
Conservative	Frank L Rees	2,741		
Conservative	Derrick B Rouse	2,677		
Conservative	Albert Edward Peter Farquhar MacRae	2,676		
Conservative	Mrs Nan Rees	2,669		
Labour	S Bishop	774		
Labour	Reginald A Russell	771		
Labour	Henry Kilkenny	752		
Labour	D F Tomsett	733		
Labour	Horace Alan H Riches	648		
Liberal	Mrs Marjorie H Jackson	530		
Liberal	Michael E Hannah	523		
Liberal	M D Colne	513		
Liberal	Willy Paul	460		
Liberal	J B Ladley	438		
Communist	Richard Thomas Gooding	161		
Turnout		4,070	32.8	
Conservative win (new seat)				
Conservative win (new seat)				
Conservative win (new seat)				
Conservative win (new seat)				
Conservative win (new seat)				

Stanmore South (3)
Party	Candidate	Votes	%	±%
Labour	Alfred James Lovell	2,025		
Labour	William Ody Allen	1,982		
Labour	Mrs Sarah R Edgeworth	1,968		
Conservative	Edward C P Taylor	1,027		
Conservative	J C Medcalf	1,025		
Conservative	D A Maddocks	1,014		
Communist	R A Ward	133		
Turnout		3,136	38.7	
Labour win (new seat)				
Labour win (new seat)				
Labour win (new seat)				

Wealdstone North (4)
Party	Candidate	Votes	%	±%
Labour	H G Grange	2,738		
Labour	Mrs Amelia M. Carey	2,725		
Labour	Cyril B Harrison	2,692		
Labour	D J R Howard	2,448		
Conservative	D W Pratt	1,522		
Conservative	T D Jones	1,516		
Conservative	F G Saxby	1,504		
Conservative	Arthur B C Turner	1,501		
Liberal	H V Goss	884		
Liberal	Mrs B E Burbery	666		
Liberal	M B Sorrell	619		
Liberal	R J Kitcher	608		
Communist	Joseph Marshall	119		
Turnout		4,998	46.8	
Labour win (new seat)				
Labour win (new seat)				
Labour win (new seat)				
Labour win (new seat)				

Wealdstone South (3)
Party	Candidate	Votes	%	±%
Conservative	D S O Smith	1,687		
Conservative	Frederick William C Adkins	1,679		
Conservative	Stanley Russell Miller	1,614		
Labour	Charles Morley	1,087		
Labour	J Lesser	1,022		
Labour	A H Elderton	1,016		
Liberal	Mrs M M Husband	628		
Liberal	C P Dobson	621		
Liberal	P Jeffery	621		
Turnout		3,427	42.4	
Conservative win (new seat)				
Conservative win (new seat)				
Conservative win (new seat)				

West Harrow (4)
Party	Candidate	Votes	%	±%
Conservative	A O’Loughlin	1,920		
Conservative	B C A Turner	1,856		
Conservative	Derek H J Hart	1,851		
Conservative	Charles Frederick J. Low	1,834		
Labour	F Mutton	1,502		
Labour	S H Roan	1,477		
Labour	Frederick S Davies	1,474		
Labour	E Beasley	1,441		
Liberal	David J Leonard	899		
Liberal	P R Coleby	894		
Liberal	Cyril C. Chadley	879		
Liberal	Mrs P Coleby	866		
Turnout		4,308	45.8	
Conservative win (new seat)				
Conservative win (new seat)				
Conservative win (new seat)				
Conservative win (new seat)				
