= 2014 Harrow London Borough Council election =

2014 local election in England

- 22 May 2014

All 63 seats to Harrow London Borough Council 32 seats needed for a majority
	First party	Second party
Party	Labour	Conservative
Seats won	34	26
Seat change	Steady	▼1
	Third party	Fourth party
Party	Independent	Liberal Democrats
Seats won	2	1
Seat change	▲1	Steady
- Map of the results of the 2010 Harrow council election. Conservatives in blue, Independents in grey, Labour in red and Liberal Democrats in yellow.
Council control before election
Conservative
Council control after election
Labour

Map of the results of the 2014 Harrow council election. Conservatives in blue, Independent in grey, Labour in red and Liberal Democrats in yellow.

The 2014 Harrow Council election took place on 22 May 2014 to elect members of Harrow Borough Council in London, England. This was on the same day as other local elections.

== Result ==
Labour won control from a minority Conservative administration. Labour won 34 seats, the Conservatives won 26 seats, the Liberal Democrats won 1 seat and Independents won 2 seats.

== Council composition ==
The council composition, as of December 2017, was 32 Labour councillors, 27 Conservatives, 3 independents and 1 Liberal Democrat.

An April 2017 by-election in the Kenton East ward saw the Conservatives gain a seat from Labour, with a 15% increase in the Conservative vote.

On 31 July 2017, Labour councillor Chika Amadi was suspended from the Labour Party due to comments she made on Twitter that compared homosexuals at Pride marches to 'paedophiles’.

== Ward Results ==
=== Belmont ===
Belmont
Party	Candidate	Votes	%	±%
Conservative	Manji Kara	1,708	47.8	+0.1
Conservative	Lynda Seymour	1,674	46.8	+1.1
Conservative	Minaxi Parmar	1,666	46.6	−0.1
Labour	Nishit Patel	1,300	36.4	+5.5
Labour	Dean Gilligan	1,210	33.8	+7.4
Labour	Farhan Ahmed	1,026	28.7	+3.7
Liberal Democrats	Anne Diamond	451	12.6	−11.0
Independent Labour	Ashvankumar Trivedi	286	8.0	N/A
Independent Labour	Smita Patel	250	7.0	N/A
Independent Labour	Abraham James	226	6.3	N/A
Turnout		3,575	42.1	
Conservative hold		Swing		
Conservative hold		Swing		
Conservative hold		Swing		

=== Canons ===
Canons
Party	Candidate	Votes	%	±%
Conservative	Ameet Jogia	2,082	55.5	−4.2
Conservative	Amir Moshenson	2,045	54.5	+0.1
Conservative	Bharat Thakker	1,944	51.8	+1.9
Labour	Howard Bluston	1,200	32.0	+8.0
Labour	Anjali Raval	1,133	30.2	+9.6
Labour	Yogalingam Dayanamby	904	24.1	+4.1
Liberal Democrats	Jack Berman	493	13.1	−3.4
Liberal Democrats	Natoo Bhana	280	7.5	−7.9
Turnout		3,750	37.2	
Conservative hold		Swing		
Conservative hold		Swing		
Conservative hold		Swing		

=== Edgware ===
Edgware
Party	Candidate	Votes	%	±%
Labour	Nitin Parekh	1,551	46.7	+2.4
Labour	Barry Kendler	1,491	44.9	+0.6
Labour	Maria Amadi	1,385	41.7	−1.7
Conservative	Sima Halai	1,215	36.6	−2.8
Conservative	Marcus Chaplin	1,074	32.3	−3.4
Conservative	Akil Dhalla	987	29.7	+0.2
Independent Labour	Meghal Patel	528	15.9	N/A
Independent Labour	Elizabeth Asante-Twumasi	361	10.9	−33.4
Independent Labour	Terence Revill	314	9.5	N/A
Turnout		3,320	39.4	
Labour hold		Swing		
Labour hold		Swing		
Labour hold		Swing		

=== Greenhill ===
Greenhill
Party	Candidate	Votes	%	±%
Labour	Sue Anderson	1,552	49.3	+6.9
Labour	Keith Ferry	1,251	39.8	+3.7
Labour	Ghazanfar Ali	1,243	39.5	+3.8
Conservative	Narinder Singh Mudhar	873	27.7	−5.8
Conservative	Bernard Segal	860	27.3	−5.1
Conservative	Ravi Sodha	772	24.5	−6.0
UKIP	Michael Moran	392	12.5	N/A
Green	Madeleine Lauder-Atkins	379	12.0	+5.7
Liberal Democrats	Helen Webster	256	8.1	−10.3
Liberal Democrats	Peter Budden	202	6.4	−11.1
Independent Labour	Kamal Mirza	179	5.7	N/A
Independent Labour	Imran Qureshi	169	5.4	N/A
Liberal Democrats	Nahid Boethe	163	5.2	−11.7
Independent Labour	Florin Surdu	111	3.5	N/A
Turnout		3,147	34.6	
Labour hold		Swing		
Labour hold		Swing		
Labour hold		Swing		

=== Harrow on the Hill ===
Harrow on the Hill
Party	Candidate	Votes	%	±%
Labour	Glen Hearnden	1,371	40.4	+1.1
Conservative	June Baxter	1,310	38.6	+5.3
Conservative	Barry Macleod-Cullinane	1,309	38.6	+5.4
Conservative	Simon Williams	1,282	37.8	+1.8
Labour	Rajendra Pudasaini	1,217	35.8	+0.9
Labour	Mohammad Rahman	1,036	30.5	−2.4
UKIP	Bruce Clark	380	11.2	N/A
Liberal Democrats	Karsten Shaw	268	7.9	−10.2
Independent Labour	Jamal Ahmed	249	7.3	N/A
Independent Labour	Shivakuru Selvathurai	242	7.1	N/A
Independent	David Gawn	221	6.5	−28.4
Turnout		3,395	39.0	
Labour hold		Swing		
Conservative hold		Swing		
Conservative gain from Labour		Swing		

=== Harrow Weald ===
Harrow Weald
Party	Candidate	Votes	%	±%
Conservative	Stephen Greek	1,498	40.4	+5.9
Conservative	Pritesh Patel	1,447	39.0	−0.9
Conservative	Ramji Chauhan	1,396	37.6	+2.1
Labour	Jim Lockie	1,020	27.5	+7.2
Labour	Shohidul Choudhury	1,008	27.2	+5.8
Labour	Peymana Assadullah	953	25.7	+6.3
Liberal Democrats	Darren Diamond	935	25.2	−8.3
Liberal Democrats	Ross Barlow	917	24.7	−5.0
Liberal Democrats	Paul Scott	912	24.6	−8.4
Independent Labour	Mohammed Afzal-Toor	158	4.3	N/A
Independent Labour	Noshaba Ahmad	156	4.2	N/A
Independent Labour	Tahir Hashmi	123	3.3	N/A
Turnout		3,710	43.4	
Conservative hold		Swing		
Conservative hold		Swing		
Conservative hold		Swing		

=== Hatch End ===
Hatch End
Party	Candidate	Votes	%	±%
Conservative	Susan Hall	2,014	59.1	−4.6
Conservative	John Hinkley	1,697	49.8	−5.0
Conservative	Jean Lammiman	1,696	49.8	−8.8
Labour	Samir Juthani	909	26.7	−2.4
Labour	Matthew Lloyd	851	25.0	−3.9
Labour	Bill Stephenson	796	23.4	−4.5
UKIP	Stanley Sheinwald	609	17.9	N/A
Liberal Democrats	Bhupinder Kaur Nandhra	321	9.4	N/A
Independent Labour	Brian Ley	159	4.7	N/A
Turnout		3,407	39.5	
Conservative hold		Swing		
Conservative hold		Swing		
Conservative hold		Swing		

=== Headstone North ===
Headstone North
Party	Candidate	Votes	%	±%
Independent	James Bond	2,047	55.3	+17.9
Independent	Georgia Weston	1,356	36.6	N/A
Conservative	Janet Mote	1,224	33.0	−6.9
Conservative	Christopher Baxter	1,148	31.0	−4.4
Conservative	Anthony Seymour	980	26.5	−10.6
Labour	Bill Phillips	776	21.0	−5.3
Labour	Keir Anderson	729	19.7	−6.5
Labour	Roger Mark	632	17.1	−8.7
UKIP	Anthony Murray	380	10.3	+5.0
Liberal Democrats	Alan Edwards	233	6.3	−13.2
Independent Labour	Diba Mazhar	129	3.5	N/A
Independent Labour	Emal Sultani	111	3.0	N/A
Turnout		3,704	46.0	
Independent hold		Swing		
Independent gain from Conservative		Swing		
Conservative hold		Swing		

=== Headstone South ===
Headstone South
Party	Candidate	Votes	%	±%
Labour	Simon Brown	1,602	47.3	+5.1
Labour	Pamela Fitzpatrick	1,519	44.8	+10.4
Labour	Sasi Suresh	1,458	43.0	+7.2
Conservative	Christine Thomas	954	28.1	−2.2
Conservative	Prakash Raja	922	27.2	−0.8
Conservative	Pravin Seedher	859	25.3	−1.1
Independent Labour	Asad Omar	408	12.0	−22.4
Independent Labour	Dushka Ahmad	401	11.8	N/A
Liberal Democrats	Rosemarie Beynon	361	10.6	−17.9
Liberal Democrats	David Barks	335	9.9	−15.5
Independent Labour	James Allie	322	9.5	N/A
Liberal Democrats	Simon Gardiner	312	9.2	−14.6
Turnout		3,390	40.7	
Labour hold		Swing		
Labour hold		Swing		
Labour hold		Swing		

=== Kenton East ===
Kenton East
Party	Candidate	Votes	%	±%
Labour	Niraj Dattani	1,695	44.8	+2.1
Labour	Aneka Shah	1,561	41.3	−9.8
Labour	Mitzi Green	1,550	41.0	−5.7
Conservative	Anjana Patel	1,310	34.6	−4.2
Conservative	Mandula Parmar	1,200	31.7	−6.4
Conservative	Vaumani Amin	1,178	31.1	−2.4
Independent Labour	Krishna James	534	14.1	N/A
Independent Labour	Bhavesh Raja	459	12.1	N/A
UKIP	Jeremy Zeid	453	12.0	N/A
Independent Labour	Savitri Panwar	377	10.0	N/A
Turnout		3,783	44.8	
Labour hold		Swing		
Labour hold		Swing		
Labour hold		Swing		

=== Kenton West ===
Kenton West
Party	Candidate	Votes	%	±%
Conservative	Vina Mithani	1,686	44.4	−0.7
Labour	Ajay Maru	1,678	44.2	+0.4
Conservative	Kantilal Rabadia	1,581	41.6	+3.6
Conservative	Yogesh Teli	1,568	41.3	−1.0
Labour	Mrinal Choudhury	1,527	40.2	+0.3
Labour	Angelina Lynch	1,510	39.7	+0.9
Independent Labour	Kavita Patel	284	7.5	N/A
Liberal Democrats	Oenone Cox	251	6.6	−14.6
Independent Labour	Manish Bharadia	230	6.1	N/A
Independent Labour	Adeel Riaz	154	4.1	N/A
Turnout		3,800	42.5	
Conservative hold		Swing		
Labour hold		Swing		
Conservative hold		Swing		

=== Marlborough ===
Marlborough
Party	Candidate	Votes	%	±%
Labour	David Perry	1,648	50.2	+3.4
Labour	Varsha Parmar	1,611	49.0	+3.6
Labour	Antonio Weiss	1,448	44.1	−3.5
Conservative	Coral Dawkins	924	28.1	−0.5
Conservative	Mathilde Kaplan	837	25.5	−1.4
Conservative	Joel Musongela	738	22.5	−4.4
Green	Lawrence Mathias	442	13.5	N/A
Independent Labour	Rehana Khanum	441	13.4	N/A
Independent Labour	Noor Sultani	398	12.1	N/A
Independent Labour	Virginie James	349	10.6	N/A
Independent	Asif Iqbal	145	4.4	N/A
Turnout		3,286	37.3	
Labour hold		Swing		
Labour hold		Swing		
Labour hold		Swing		

=== Pinner ===
Pinner
Party	Candidate	Votes	%	±%
Conservative	Norman Stevenson	1,734	53.1	−3.6
Conservative	Stephen Wright	1,725	52.8	−0.7
Conservative	Paul Osborn	1,678	51.4	−1.7
Labour	Jeffrey Gallant	820	25.1	+1.5
Labour	Timothy Oelman	771	23.6	+3.7
Labour	Ertugrul Kaya	663	20.3	+3.6
UKIP	Zbigniew Kowalczyk	474	14.5	N/A
Green	Bernadette Pillai	462	14.1	N/A
Liberal Democrats	Veronica Chamberlain	417	12.8	−10.1
Turnout		3,266	40.1	
Conservative hold		Swing		
Conservative hold		Swing		
Conservative hold		Swing		

=== Pinner South ===
Pinner South
Party	Candidate	Votes	%	±%
Conservative	Richard Almond	1,889	56.4	+4.8
Conservative	Charles Mote	1,751	52.3	−6.1
Conservative	Kamaljit Singh Chana	1,659	49.6	+1.5
Labour	Jane Massey	1,062	31.7	+1.8
Labour	Benjamin Young	1,007	30.1	+3.7
Labour	Ashwin Dharmasingham	949	28.4	+5.3
UKIP	Colin Turfus	511	15.3	N/A
Turnout		3,347	41.2	
Conservative hold		Swing		
Conservative hold		Swing		
Conservative hold		Swing		

=== Queensbury ===
Queensbury
Party	Candidate	Votes	%	±%
Labour	Michael Borio	1,643	43.9	+0.8
Labour	Sachin Shah	1,630	43.6	−4.9
Labour	Kiran Ramchandani	1,547	41.3	−1.4
Conservative	Bharat Mistri	1,300	34.7	−5.4
Conservative	Peter Mendes	1,219	32.6	−6.9
Conservative	Panna Raja	1,095	29.3	−6.3
Independent Labour	Sanjay Karia	502	13.4	N/A
Independent Labour	Nizam Ismail	412	11.0	−31.7
Independent Labour	Trevor James	352	9.4	N/A
Green	Dario Celaschi	294	7.9	N/A
Liberal Democrats	Laurence Cox	245	6.5	−14.7
Turnout		3,742	42.3	
Labour hold		Swing		
Labour hold		Swing		
Labour hold		Swing		

=== Rayners Lane ===
Rayners Lane
Party	Candidate	Votes	%	±%
Labour	Krishna Suresh	1,448	36.5	+3.3
Labour	Jeff Anderson	1,272	32.1	+3.9
Liberal Democrats	Christopher Noyce	1,217	30.7	−6.2
Labour	Owen Fields	1,174	29.6	+4.3
Conservative	Joyce Nickolay	1,112	28.0	−3.7
Conservative	John Nickolay	1,060	26.7	−1.7
Conservative	Lesline Lewinson	859	21.7	−6.3
Liberal Democrats	Prakash Kaur Nandhra	787	19.8	−9.4
Liberal Democrats	Matthew Edwards	750	18.9	−9.2
UKIP	Herbert Crossman	408	10.3	+7.0
Independent Labour	Ratneswary Muthukumar	406	10.2	N/A
Independent Labour	Vaithilingam Pathmanathan	402	10.1	N/A
Green	Rowan Langley	271	6.8	+1.0
Independent Labour	Saifullah Khalid	264	6.7	N/A
Turnout		3,967	46.2	
Labour hold		Swing		
Labour gain from Conservative		Swing		
Liberal Democrats hold		Swing		

=== Roxbourne ===
Roxbourne
Party	Candidate	Votes	%	±%
Labour	Robert Currie	1,921	52.1	+0.3
Labour	Graham Henson	1,802	48.8	−0.6
Labour	Josephine Dooley	1,689	45.8	−4.8
Conservative	Stephen Dixon	862	23.4	−3.9
Independent Labour	Mano Dharmarajah	778	21.1	−29.5
Conservative	Alessandro Mote	743	20.1	−7.2
Conservative	Rasmus Sonderskov	640	17.3	−9.7
Independent Labour	Nilesh Jobanputra	540	14.6	N/A
Independent Labour	Sajid Khokher	498	13.5	N/A
Liberal Democrats	Marshel Amutharasan	353	9.6	−7.5
Liberal Democrats	John Knight	278	7.5	−11.7
Turnout		3,690	39.8	
Labour hold		Swing		
Labour hold		Swing		
Labour hold		Swing		

=== Roxeth ===
Roxeth
Party	Candidate	Votes	%	±%
Labour	Margaret Davine	1,705	49.5	+1.6
Labour	Jerry Miles	1,647	47.9	−2.0
Labour	Primesh Patel	1,451	42.2	−3.8
Conservative	John Baxter	952	27.7	−1.5
Independent Labour	Thayapara Idaikkadar	791	23.0	−24.9
Conservative	Mohammad Kaiserimam	786	22.8	−6.3
Conservative	Dinesh Solanki	734	21.3	−5.9
Independent Labour	Zarina Khalid	668	19.4	N/A
Independent Labour	Sukhvinder Singh Mukhal	668	19.4	N/A
Turnout		3,442	40.8	
Labour hold		Swing		
Labour hold		Swing		
Labour hold		Swing		

=== Stanmore Park ===
Stanmore Park
Party	Candidate	Votes	%	±%
Conservative	Camilla Bath	2,071	62.0	−1.5
Conservative	Marilyn Ashton	2,030	60.8	+8.5
Conservative	Christine Bednell	1,946	58.3	−4.0
Labour	Ernest Selby	779	23.3	+1.1
Labour	Laura Stackpoole	734	22.0	+2.2
Labour	Lesley Stackpoole	635	19.0	±0.0
UKIP	Victor Vincelli	421	12.6	N/A
Independent	Linda Robinson	311	9.3	
Turnout		3,339	37.1	
Conservative hold		Swing		
Conservative hold		Swing		
Conservative hold		Swing		

=== Wealdstone ===
Wealdstone
Party	Candidate	Votes	%	±%
Labour	Phillip O'Dell	1,416	46.5	−4.8
Labour	Rajeshri Shah	1,383	45.4	−0.6
Labour	Anne Whitehead	1,290	42.4	−10.0
Conservative	David Ashton	755	24.8	−5.6
Conservative	Nicola Blackman	730	24.0	−5.6
Conservative	Paul Greek	659	21.7	−5.1
Independent Labour	Pareshaben Panchal	590	19.4	N/A
Independent Labour	Asrar Ahmad	589	19.4	N/A
Independent Labour	Ashfaq Kaleem	574	18.9	N/A
Green	Michael Gubbins	352	11.6	−0.7
Turnout		3,043	38.2	
Labour hold		Swing		
Labour hold		Swing		
Labour hold		Swing		

=== West Harrow ===
West Harrow
Party	Candidate	Votes	%	±%
Labour	Christine Robson	1,462	42.8	−0.2
Labour	Kareema Marikar	1,392	40.8	+5.0
Labour	Adam Swersky	1,276	37.4	+2.5
Conservative	Julia Merison	1,202	35.2	+2.9
Conservative	Kanagasabaapathy Kuha-Kumaran	1,143	33.5	−1.1
Conservative	John Rennie	1,104	32.3	−2.1
Independent	Barry Jackson	443	13.0	N/A
Liberal Democrats	Maureen de Beer	247	7.2	−13.5
Independent Labour	William Stoodley	195	5.7	−29.2
Independent Labour	Sudesh Arachchige	192	5.6	N/A
Independent Labour	Hapuarachchige Jay	186	5.4	N/A
Liberal Democrats	John Branch	173	5.1	−11.9
Liberal Democrats	Gabrielle Branch	172	5.0	−10.6
Turnout		3,413	43.9	
Labour hold		Swing		
Labour hold		Swing		
Labour hold		Swing		
