= 2010 Harrow London Borough Council election =

2010 local election in England

2010 Harrow Borough Council election
- 6 May 2010

All 63 seats to Harrow London Borough Council 32 seats needed for a majority
| | First party | Second party |
|---|---|---|
| Party | Labour | Conservative |
| Last election | 24 seats, 30.9% | 38 seats, 46.3% |
| Seats won | 34 | 27 |
| Seat change | ▲10 | ▼11 |
| Popular vote | 42,445 | 47,691 |
| Percentage | 34.9% | 39.3% |
| Swing | ▲4.0% | ▼7.0% |
| | Third party | Fourth party |
| Party | Liberal Democrats | Independent |
| Last election | 1 seat, 19.6% | 0 seats, 0.5% |
| Seats won | 1 | 1 |
| Seat change | Steady | ▲1 |
| Popular vote | 24,433 | 3,629 |
| Percentage | 20.1% | 3.0% |
| Swing | ▲0.5% | ▲2.5% |
- Map of the results of the 2010 Harrow council election. Conservatives in blue, Independents in grey, Labour in red and Liberal Democrats in yellow.
Council control before election
Conservative
Council control after election
Labour

Elections for Harrow London Borough Council were held on 6 May 2010. The 2010 General Election and other local elections took place on the same day.

In London council elections the entire council is elected every four years, whereas in some local elections one councillor per ward is elected every year in three out of the four years.

== Results ==
Harrow Council election result 2010
| Party | Seats | Gains | Losses | Net gain/loss | Seats % | Votes % | Votes | +/− |
|---|---|---|---|---|---|---|---|---|
| Labour | 34 | 10 | 0 | ▲10 | 54.0 | 34.9 | 42,445 | ▲4.0 |
| Conservative | 27 | 0 | 11 | ▼11 | 42.9 | 39.3 | 47,691 | ▼7.0 |
| Liberal Democrats | 1 | 0 | 0 | Steady | 1.6 | 20.1 | 24,433 | ▲0.5 |
| Independent | 1 | 1 | 0 | ▲1 | 1.6 | 3.0 | 3,629 | ▲2.5 |
| Green | 0 | 0 | 0 | Steady | 0.0 | 1.6 | 1,901 | ▼0.6 |
| UKIP | 0 | 0 | 0 | Steady | 0.0 | 0.6 | 761 | New |
| CPA | 0 | 0 | 0 | Steady | 0.0 | 0.5 | 603 | New |

== Ward results ==
=== Belmont ===
Belmont (3)
| Party | Candidate | Votes | % | ±% |
|---|---|---|---|---|
| Conservative | Manji Kara | 2,702 | 47.7 | |
| Conservative | Barry Macleod-Cullinane | 2,644 | 46.7 | |
| Conservative | Lynda Seymour | 2,588 | 45.7 | |
| Labour | Niraj Dattani | 1,750 | 30.9 | |
| Labour | Santosh Hargovan | 1,497 | 26.4 | |
| Labour | Lesley Stackpole | 1,415 | 25.0 | |
| Liberal Democrats | Anne Diamond | 1,335 | 23.6 | |
| Liberal Democrats | Vasudev Patel | 1,288 | 22.7 | |
| Liberal Democrats | Charles Boethe | 1,180 | 20.8 | |
| Turnout | | 5,740 | 69.6 | |
| Conservative hold | | Swing | | |
| Conservative hold | | Swing | | |
| Conservative hold | | Swing | | |

=== Canons ===
Canons (3)
| Party | Candidate | Votes | % | ±% |
|---|---|---|---|---|
| Conservative | John Cowan | 3,643 | 59.7 | |
| Conservative | Richard Romain | 3,320 | 54.4 | |
| Conservative | Musarrat Akhtar | 3,047 | 49.9 | |
| Labour | Nitin Parekh | 1,467 | 24.0 | |
| Labour | Abiodun Anthony-Ojolola | 1,259 | 20.6 | |
| Labour | Laura Stackpole | 1,219 | 20.0 | |
| Liberal Democrats | Jack Berman | 1,006 | 16.5 | |
| Liberal Democrats | David Lerner | 970 | 15.9 | |
| Liberal Democrats | Natoo Bhana | 940 | 15.4 | |
| Turnout | | 6,153 | 65.4 | |
| Conservative hold | | Swing | | |
| Conservative hold | | Swing | | |
| Conservative hold | | Swing | | |

=== Edgware ===
Edgware (3)
| Party | Candidate | Votes | % | ±% |
|---|---|---|---|---|
| Labour | Margaret Davine | 2,149 | 44.3 | |
| Labour | Elizabeth Asante-Twumasi | 2,148 | 44.3 | |
| Labour | Mrinal Choudhury | 2,103 | 43.4 | |
| Conservative | Sima Halai | 1,907 | 39.4 | |
| Conservative | Bharat Pindoria | 1,728 | 35.7 | |
| Conservative | Pravin Seedher | 1,430 | 29.5 | |
| Liberal Democrats | Peter Fletcher | 1,180 | 24.3 | |
| Turnout | | 4,881 | 60.2 | |
| Labour hold | | Swing | | |
| Labour hold | | Swing | | |
| Labour hold | | Swing | | |

=== Greenhill ===
Greenhill (3)
| Party | Candidate | Votes | % | ±% |
|---|---|---|---|---|
| Labour | Susan Anderson | 2,033 | 42.4 | |
| Labour | Bill Phillips | 1,729 | 36.1 | |
| Labour | Ben Wealthy | 1,709 | 35.7 | |
| Conservative | Golam Chowdhury | 1,605 | 33.5 | |
| Conservative | Simon Dunkerley | 1,554 | 32.4 | |
| Conservative | Narinder Singh Mudhar | 1,463 | 30.5 | |
| Liberal Democrats | Simon Gardiner | 883 | 18.4 | |
| Liberal Democrats | Oenone Cox | 839 | 17.5 | |
| Liberal Democrats | Yasmin Khan | 809 | 16.9 | |
| Green | Sarah Kersey | 343 | 7.2 | |
| Green | Madeleine Lauder-Atkins | 301 | 6.3 | |
| Green | Antony Rablen | 179 | 3.7 | |
| Turnout | | 4,813 | 57.7 | |
| Labour gain from Conservative | | Swing | | |
| Labour gain from Conservative | | Swing | | |
| Labour gain from Conservative | | Swing | | |

=== Harrow on the Hill ===
Harrow on the Hill (3)
| Party | Candidate | Votes | % | ±% |
|---|---|---|---|---|
| Labour | Ann Gate | 1,948 | 39.3 | |
| Conservative | Simon Williams | 1,786 | 36.0 | |
| Labour | David Gawn | 1,729 | 34.9 | |
| Conservative | Ameet Jogia | 1,651 | 33.3 | |
| Conservative | Sameer Mirza | 1,646 | 33.2 | |
| Labour | Abu Saud | 1,630 | 32.9 | |
| Independent | Eileen Kinnear | 1,021 | 20.6 | |
| Liberal Democrats | Gabrielle Branch | 973 | 19.6 | |
| Liberal Democrats | Karsten Shaw | 899 | 18.1 | |
| Independent | Christine Jones | 641 | 12.9 | |
| Independent | Marcello Borgese | 500 | 10.1 | |
| Turnout | | 4,995 | 60.6 | |
| Labour gain from Conservative | | Swing | | |
| Conservative hold | | Swing | | |
| Labour gain from Conservative | | Swing | | |

=== Harrow Weald ===
Harrow Weald (3)
| Party | Candidate | Votes | % | ±% |
|---|---|---|---|---|
| Conservative | Anthony Ferrari | 2,199 | 39.9 | |
| Conservative | Ramji Chauhan | 1,956 | 35.5 | |
| Conservative | Stephen Greek | 1,902 | 34.5 | |
| Liberal Democrats | Darren Diamond | 1,845 | 33.5 | |
| Liberal Democrats | Paul Scott | 1,819 | 33.0 | |
| Liberal Democrats | Pash Nandhra | 1,634 | 29.7 | |
| Labour | Shohidul Choudhury | 1,178 | 21.4 | |
| Labour | Archie Foulds | 1,116 | 20.3 | |
| Labour | Mukesh Shah | 1,067 | 19.4 | |
| Turnout | | 5,534 | 65.5 | |
| Conservative hold | | Swing | | |
| Conservative hold | | Swing | | |
| Conservative hold | | Swing | | |

=== Hatch End ===
Hatch End (3)
| Party | Candidate | Votes | % | ±% |
|---|---|---|---|---|
| Conservative | Susan Hall | 3,602 | 63.7 | |
| Conservative | Jean Lammiman | 3,316 | 58.6 | |
| Conservative | Stanley Sheinwald | 3,099 | 54.8 | |
| Labour | Jeffrey Anderson | 1,649 | 29.1 | |
| Labour | Michael Boria | 1,634 | 28.9 | |
| Labour | John Solomon | 1,579 | 27.9 | |
| Independent | Joan Langrognat | 460 | 8.1 | |
| Turnout | | 5,712 | 70.0 | |
| Conservative hold | | Swing | | |
| Conservative hold | | Swing | | |
| Conservative hold | | Swing | | |

=== Headstone North ===
Headstone North (3)
| Party | Candidate | Votes | % | ±% |
|---|---|---|---|---|
| Conservative | Janet Mote | 2,290 | 39.9 | |
| Independent | James Bond | 2,148 | 37.4 | |
| Conservative | Anthony Seymour | 2,130 | 37.1 | |
| Conservative | Eric Silver | 2,033 | 35.4 | |
| Labour | Meryn McLaren | 1,509 | 26.3 | |
| Labour | Steve Forrest | 1,507 | 26.2 | |
| Labour | Aneka Shah | 1,480 | 25.8 | |
| Liberal Democrats | Zia Baig | 1,123 | 19.5 | |
| UKIP | Anthony Murray | 306 | 5.3 | |
| CPA | Sella Jeyakumar | 186 | 32 | |
| CPA | Douglas Collier | 144 | 2.5 | |
| CPA | Adeniyi Sulaiman | 84 | 1.5 | |
| Turnout | | 5,754 | 72.6 | |
| Conservative hold | | Swing | | |
| Independent gain from Conservative | | Swing | | |
| Conservative hold | | Swing | | |

=== Headstone South ===
Headstone South (3)
| Party | Candidate | Votes | % | ±% |
|---|---|---|---|---|
| Labour | Bill Stephenson | 2,260 | 42.2 | |
| Labour | Sasikala Suresh | 1,914 | 35.8 | |
| Labour | Asad Omar | 1,843 | 34.4 | |
| Conservative | Christine Thomas | 1,623 | 30.3 | |
| Liberal Democrats | Ronald Thornton | 1,527 | 28.5 | |
| Conservative | Prakash Raja | 1,499 | 28.0 | |
| Conservative | Savan Shah | 1,413 | 26.4 | |
| Liberal Democrats | Riyaz Khaku | 1,357 | 25.4 | |
| Liberal Democrats | Nahid Boethe | 1,272 | 23.8 | |
| CPA | Margaret Clarke | 171 | 3.2 | |
| CPA | Mauran Uthayakumar | 157 | 2.9 | |
| CPA | Gloria Folaranmi | 60 | 1.1 | |
| Turnout | | 5,381 | 67.4 | |
| Labour hold | | Swing | | |
| Labour hold | | Swing | | |
| Labour hold | | Swing | | |

=== Kenton East ===
Kenton East (3)
| Party | Candidate | Votes | % | ±% |
|---|---|---|---|---|
| Labour | Navin Shah | 2,672 | 51.1 | |
| Labour | Mitzi Green | 2,442 | 46.7 | |
| Labour | Victoria Silver | 2,236 | 42.7 | |
| Conservative | Jitendra Vekaria | 2,031 | 38.8 | |
| Conservative | Minaxi Parmar | 1,995 | 38.1 | |
| Conservative | Amir Moshenson | 1,756 | 33.5 | |
| Liberal Democrats | Jack Furniss | 1,002 | 19.1 | |
| Turnout | | 5,269 | 64.1 | |
| Labour hold | | Swing | | |
| Labour hold | | Swing | | |
| Labour hold | | Swing | | |

=== Kenton West ===
Kenton West (3)
| Party | Candidate | Votes | % | ±% |
|---|---|---|---|---|
| Conservative | Vina Mithani | 2,584 | 45.1 | |
| Labour | Ajay Maru | 2,508 | 43.8 | |
| Conservative | Yogesh Teli | 2,423 | 42.3 | |
| Labour | Caroline Francis | 2,286 | 39.9 | |
| Labour | Richard Harrod | 2,220 | 38.8 | |
| Conservative | Jeremy Zeid | 2,176 | 38.0 | |
| Liberal Democrats | Maureen de Beer | 1,212 | 21.2 | |
| Turnout | | 5,765 | 66.1 | |
| Conservative hold | | Swing | | |
| Labour gain from Conservative | | Swing | | |
| Conservative hold | | Swing | | |

=== Marlborough ===
Marlborough (3)
| Party | Candidate | Votes | % | ±% |
|---|---|---|---|---|
| Labour | Krishna James | 2,458 | 47.6 | |
| Labour | David Perry | 2,419 | 46.8 | |
| Labour | Varsha Parmar | 2,346 | 45.4 | |
| Conservative | Bharti Solanki | 1,475 | 28.6 | |
| Conservative | Edwin Solomon | 1,392 | 26.9 | |
| Conservative | Puja Solanki | 1,391 | 26.9 | |
| Liberal Democrats | Peter Budden | 1,143 | 22.1 | |
| Liberal Democrats | Jaydeep Patel | 946 | 18.3 | |
| Liberal Democrats | Ronald Warshaw | 924 | 17.9 | |
| Turnout | | 5,197 | 61.8 | |
| Labour hold | | Swing | | |
| Labour hold | | Swing | | |
| Labour hold | | Swing | | |

=== Pinner ===
Pinner (3)
| Party | Candidate | Votes | % | ±% |
|---|---|---|---|---|
| Conservative | Mavis Champagnie | 3,070 | 56.7 | |
| Conservative | Stephen Wright | 2,895 | 53.5 | |
| Conservative | Paul Osborn | 2,871 | 53.1 | |
| Labour | Jeffrey Gallant | 1,277 | 23.6 | |
| Liberal Democrats | Veronica Chamberlain | 1,239 | 22.9 | |
| Liberal Democrats | Leslie Moss | 1,172 | 21.7 | |
| Labour | Janice Tushaw | 1,078 | 19.9 | |
| Labour | Michael Tushaw | 901 | 16.7 | |
| Turnout | | 5,435 | 68.4 | |
| Conservative hold | | Swing | | |
| Conservative hold | | Swing | | |
| Conservative hold | | Swing | | |

=== Pinner South ===
Pinner South (3)
| Party | Candidate | Votes | % | ±% |
|---|---|---|---|---|
| Conservative | Charles Mote | 3,400 | 58.4 | |
| Conservative | John Nickolay | 3,002 | 51.6 | |
| Conservative | Kamaljit Chana | 2,801 | 48.1 | |
| Labour | Jane Massey | 1,740 | 29.9 | |
| Labour | Uma Kumaran | 1,535 | 26.4 | |
| Liberal Democrats | Benedict Rich | 1,527 | 26.2 | |
| Labour | Ernest Selby | 1,343 | 23.1 | |
| Turnout | | 5,863 | 72.8 | |
| Conservative hold | | Swing | | |
| Conservative hold | | Swing | | |
| Conservative hold | | Swing | | |

=== Queensbury ===
Queensbury (3)
| Party | Candidate | Votes | % | ±% |
|---|---|---|---|---|
| Labour | Sachin Shah | 2,645 | 48.5 | |
| Labour | Zarina Khalid | 2,349 | 43.1 | |
| Labour | Nizam Ismail | 2,324 | 42.7 | |
| Conservative | Bharat Mistri | 2,183 | 40.1 | |
| Conservative | Arun Bhundia | 2,152 | 39.5 | |
| Conservative | Dinesh Solanki | 1,942 | 35.6 | |
| Liberal Democrats | Laurence Cox | 1,156 | 21.2 | |
| Turnout | | 5,489 | 63.7 | |
| Labour hold | | Swing | | |
| Labour hold | | Swing | | |
| Labour gain from Conservative | | Swing | | |

=== Rayners Lane ===
Rayners Lane (3)
| Party | Candidate | Votes | % | ±% |
|---|---|---|---|---|
| Liberal Democrats | Christopher Noyce | 2,115 | 36.9 | |
| Labour | Krishna Suresh | 1,904 | 33.2 | |
| Conservative | Lily Nickolay | 1,818 | 31.7 | |
| Liberal Democrats | Geraldine Noyce | 1,675 | 29.2 | |
| Conservative | Sivinatharasa Panchadcharam | 1,628 | 28.4 | |
| Labour | Howard Bluston | 1,615 | 28.2 | |
| Liberal Democrats | Marshel Amutharasan | 1,614 | 28.1 | |
| Conservative | Ashok Kulkarni | 1,603 | 28.0 | |
| Labour | Mohammad Rahman | 1,450 | 25.3 | |
| Green | Rowan Langley | 331 | 5.8 | |
| UKIP | Arthur Petchey | 190 | 3.3 | |
| UKIP | Manesh Padhiar | 144 | 2.5 | |
| CPA | Malcolm Clarke | 117 | 2.0 | |
| CPA | Karen Collier | 98 | 1.7 | |
| CPA | Danaraj Joseph | 78 | 1.4 | |
| Turnout | | 5,755 | 69.5 | |
| Liberal Democrats hold | | Swing | | |
| Labour gain from Conservative | | Swing | | |
| Conservative hold | | Swing | | |

=== Roxbourne ===
Roxbourne (3)
| Party | Candidate | Votes | % | ±% |
|---|---|---|---|---|
| Labour | Robert Currie | 2,725 | 51.8 | |
| Labour | Manoharan Dharmarajah | 2,662 | 50.6 | |
| Labour | Graham Henson | 2,596 | 49.4 | |
| Conservative | Sockanathan Keitheeswaran | 1,437 | 27.3 | |
| Conservative | Norman Stevenson | 1,437 | 27.3 | |
| Conservative | Shivakuru Selvathurai | 1,419 | 27.0 | |
| Liberal Democrats | John Knight | 1,012 | 19.2 | |
| Liberal Democrats | John Skipworth | 901 | 17.1 | |
| Liberal Democrats | Vipin Varsani | 799 | 15.2 | |
| Turnout | | 5,289 | 61.0 | |
| Labour hold | | Swing | | |
| Labour hold | | Swing | | |
| Labour hold | | Swing | | |

=== Roxeth ===
Roxeth
| Party | Candidate | Votes | % | ±% |
|---|---|---|---|---|
| Labour | Jeremy Miles | 2,618 | 49.9 | |
| Labour | Thayapara Idaikkadar | 2,514 | 47.9 | |
| Labour | Radhikaranjan Ray | 2,415 | 46.0 | |
| Conservative | Ansala Peterpillai | 1,531 | 29.2 | |
| Conservative | Gary Markwell | 1,524 | 29.1 | |
| Conservative | Golsom Sims | 1,425 | 27.2 | |
| Liberal Democrats | Donald Clarke | 1,030 | 19.6 | |
| Liberal Democrats | Nicola Lane | 916 | 17.5 | |
| Liberal Democrats | Michael Sayer | 842 | 16.1 | |
| Turnout | | 5,279 | 65.0 | |
| Labour hold | | Swing | | |
| Labour hold | | Swing | | |
| Labour hold | | Swing | | |

=== Stanmore Park ===
Stanmore Park (3)
| Party | Candidate | Votes | % | ±% |
|---|---|---|---|---|
| Conservative | Camilla Bath | 3,586 | 63.5 | |
| Conservative | Christine Bednell | 3,516 | 62.3 | |
| Conservative | Mark Versallion | 2,954 | 52.3 | |
| Labour | Eileen McNulty | 1,255 | 22.2 | |
| Labour | Ann Groves | 1,119 | 19.8 | |
| Labour | Trevor James | 1,072 | 19.0 | |
| Liberal Democrats | Sylvia Warshaw | 825 | 14.6 | |
| Liberal Democrats | Clifford Thomas | 805 | 14.3 | |
| Green | Linda Robinson | 462 | 8.2 | |
| Turnout | | 5,664 | 65.8 | |
| Conservative hold | | Swing | | |
| Conservative hold | | Swing | | |
| Conservative hold | | Swing | | |

=== Wealdstone ===
Wealdstone (3)
| Party | Candidate | Votes | % | ±% |
|---|---|---|---|---|
| Labour | Keith Ferry | 2,503 | 52.4 | |
| Labour | Phillip O'Dell | 2,452 | 51.3 | |
| Labour | Rajeshri Shah | 2,199 | 46.0 | |
| Conservative | Akil Dhalla | 1,452 | 30.4 | |
| Conservative | Mradula Parmar | 1,414 | 29.6 | |
| Conservative | Kantilal Rabadia | 1,278 | 26.8 | |
| Liberal Democrats | Sheila O'Reilly | 1,244 | 26.0 | |
| Green | Lawrence Mathias | 586 | 12.3 | |
| Turnout | | 4,800 | 62.9 | |
| Labour hold | | Swing | | |
| Labour hold | | Swing | | |
| Labour hold | | Swing | | |

=== West Harrow ===
West Harrow (3)
| Party | Candidate | Votes | % | ±% |
|---|---|---|---|---|
| Labour | Brian Gate | 2,197 | 43.0 | |
| Labour | Kairul Marikar | 1,831 | 35.8 | |
| Labour | William Stoodley | 1,783 | 34.9 | |
| Conservative | Anjana Patel | 1,767 | 34.6 | |
| Conservative | Daniel Hooper | 1,760 | 34.4 | |
| Conservative | Julia Merison | 1,651 | 32.3 | |
| Liberal Democrats | Robert Clapp | 1,056 | 20.7 | |
| Liberal Democrats | Simon Courtenage | 871 | 17.0 | |
| Liberal Democrats | Mark Hofman | 797 | 15.6 | |
| UKIP | Herbert Crossman | 265 | 5.2 | |
| CPA | Ciaran Nolan | 129 | 2.5 | |
| CPA | Miriam Hubbard | 96 | 1.9 | |
| CPA | Julie Nolan | 87 | 1.7 | |
| Turnout | | 5,136 | 68.8 | |
| Labour gain from Conservative | | Swing | | |
| Labour gain from Conservative | | Swing | | |
| Labour hold | | Swing | | |
