= 2006 Harrow London Borough Council election =

- 4 May 2006

All 63 seats to Harrow London Borough Council 32 seats needed for a majority
	First party	Second party	Third party
Party	Conservative	Labour	Liberal Democrats
Seats won	38	24	1
Seat change	▲9	▼7	▼2
Popular vote	31,420	20,951	13,268
Percentage	46.3%	30.9%	19.6%
Swing	▼4.1%	▼11.9%	▲17.3%
- Map of the results of the 2006 Harrow council election. Conservatives in blue, Labour in red and Liberal Democrats in yellow.
Council control before election
No overall control
Council control after election
Conservative

The 2006 Harrow Council election took place on 4 May 2006 to elect members of Harrow London Borough Council in London, England. The whole council was up for election and the Conservative Party gained control of the council after there being no overall control.

== Election result ==
Harrow local election result 2006
Party	Seats	Gains	Losses	Net gain/loss	Seats %	Votes %	Votes	+/−
Conservative	38	10	1	▲9	60.3	46.3	31,420	▼4.1
Labour	24	0	7	▼7	38.1	30.9	20,951	▼11.9
Liberal Democrats	1	1	3	▼2	1.6	19.6	13,268	▲17.3
Green	0	0	0	Steady	0.0	2.2	1,507	▲0.6
People's Independent Party 2002	0	0	0	Steady	0.0	0.5	341	▼2.3
Independent	0	0	0	Steady	0.0	0.5	322	N/A

== Ward results ==
=== Belmont ===
Belmont (3)
Party	Candidate	Votes	%	±%
Conservative	David Ashton	1,775	49.7	
Conservative	Barry Macleod-Cullinane	1,563		
Conservative	Manji Kara	1,547		
Liberal Democrats	Laurence Cox	979	27.4	
Liberal Democrats	Anne Diamond	957		
Liberal Democrats	Vasudev Patel	871		
Labour	Kantilal Patel	815	22.8	
Labour	Gunvant Thacker	720		
Labour	Dharshana Pathirana	702		
Turnout			45.9	
Conservative hold		Swing		
Conservative hold		Swing		
Conservative hold		Swing		

=== Canons ===
Canons (3)
Party	Candidate	Votes	%	±%
Conservative	Janet Cowan	2,214	67.8	
Conservative	John Cowan	2,173		
Conservative	Richard Romain	2,085		
Labour	Richard Harrod	602	18.4	
Labour	Shirley Ramnarine	536		
Labour	John Sutcliffe	474		
Liberal Democrats	Jack Berman	450	13.8	
Liberal Democrats	Michael Fierstone	394		
Liberal Democrats	Natoo Bhana	372		
Turnout			38.0	
Conservative hold		Swing		
Conservative hold		Swing		
Conservative hold		Swing		

=== Edgware ===
Edgware (3)
Party	Candidate	Votes	%	±%
Labour	Mrinal Choudhury	1,252	46.4	
Labour	Margaret Davine	1,160		
Labour	Elizabeth Asante-Twumasi	1,108		
Conservative	Bharat Mistri	989	36.7	
Conservative	Simon Pratt	924		
Conservative	Janet Silber	860		
Liberal Democrats	Margaret Warne	457	16.9	
Liberal Democrats	Joyce Ezro	394		
Liberal Democrats	Olga Abrahams	378		
Turnout			37.2	
Labour hold		Swing		
Labour hold		Swing		
Labour hold		Swing		

=== Greenhill ===
Greenhill (3)
Party	Candidate	Votes	%	±%
Conservative	Golam Chowdhury	1,015	33.5	
Conservative	Narinder Singh Mudhar	934		
Conservative	Thomas Weiss	916		
Labour	Howard Bluston	802	26.5	
Labour	Meryn McLaren	791		
Liberal Democrats	Helen Webster	775	25.6	
Liberal Democrats	Paul Scott	750		
Liberal Democrats	Peter Budden	750		
Labour	William Phillips	748		
Green	Sarah Kersey	435	14.4	
Turnout			36.9	
Conservative gain from Labour		Swing		
Conservative gain from Labour		Swing		
Conservative gain from Labour		Swing		

=== Harrow on the Hill ===
Harrow on the Hill (3)
Party	Candidate	Votes	%	±%
Conservative	Eileen Kinnear	1,550	54.9	
Conservative	Frederick Billson	1,493		
Conservative	Mark Versallion	1,424		
Labour	Ann Gate	810	28.7	
Labour	Nicholas Smith	707		
Labour	Christopher Taggart	651		
Liberal Democrats	Duncan Rogers	462	16.4	
Liberal Democrats	Clifford Thomas	436		
Liberal Democrats	Vipinprakash Varsani	397		
Turnout			37.3	
Conservative hold		Swing		
Conservative hold		Swing		
Conservative hold		Swing		

=== Harrow Weald ===
Harrow Weald (3)
Party	Candidate	Votes	%	±%
Conservative	John Anderson	1,513	46.1	
Conservative	Anthony Ferrari	1,489		
Conservative	Robert Benson	1,487		
Liberal Democrats	Colin Jones	1,155	34.4	
Liberal Democrats	Gabrielle Branch	1,129		
Liberal Democrats	Maureen De Beer	1,127		
Labour	Eileen McNulty	643	19.6	
Labour	Shohidul Choudhury	574		
Labour	Aneka Shah	562		
Turnout			41.5	
Conservative gain from Liberal Democrats		Swing		
Conservative gain from Liberal Democrats		Swing		
Conservative gain from Liberal Democrats		Swing		

=== Hatch End ===
Hatch End (3)
Party	Candidate	Votes	%	±%
Conservative	Susan Hall	2,268	67.2	
Conservative	Jean Lammiman	2,190		
Conservative	Stanley Sheinwald	2,129		
Labour	Susan Anderson	651	19.3	
Labour	John Solomon	591		
Labour	Timothy Oelman	587		
Liberal Democrats	Eileen Colledge	455	13.5	
Liberal Democrats	Alfred Colledge	427		
Liberal Democrats	Joan Langrognat	409		
Turnout			42.8	
Conservative hold		Swing		
Conservative hold		Swing		
Conservative hold		Swing		

=== Headstone North ===
Headstone North (3)
Party	Candidate	Votes	%	±%
Conservative	Janet Mote	1,938	56.4	
Conservative	Anthony Seymour	1,926		
Conservative	Eric Silver	1,914		
Liberal Democrats	Geraldine O'Neill	781	22.7	
Labour	Eileen Burton	719	20.9	
Liberal Democrats	Zia Baig	713		
Liberal Democrats	Nahid Boethe	650		
Labour	Gopal Gobiratnam	633		
Labour	Sockalingam Karunalingam	595		
Turnout			45.7	
Conservative hold		Swing		
Conservative hold		Swing		
Conservative hold		Swing		

=== Headstone South ===
Headstone South (3)
Party	Candidate	Votes	%	±%
Labour	Bill Stephenson	1,249	34.0	
Labour	Sasikala Suresh	1,145		
Labour	Asad Omar	1,097		
Liberal Democrats	Oenone Cox	1,067	29.0	
Liberal Democrats	Darren Diamond	1,036		
Liberal Democrats	Sohail Anwar	1,011		
Conservative	Jeremy Child	928	25.3	
Conservative	Mary John	897		
Conservative	Purshottam Patel	856		
Green	Jennifer Hunt	431	11.7	
Turnout			46.7	
Labour hold		Swing		
Labour hold		Swing		
Labour hold		Swing		

=== Kenton East ===
Kenton East (3)
Party	Candidate	Votes	%	±%
Labour	Navin Shah	1,623	48.5	
Labour	Mitzi Green	1,477		
Labour	Archie Foulds	1,433		
Conservative	Jitendra Vekaria	1,231	36.8	
Conservative	Clive Harriss	1,066		
Conservative	Pravin Seedher	1,009		
Liberal Democrats	Maureen Jordan	371	11.1	
Liberal Democrats	Charles Boethe	340		
Liberal Democrats	Zbigniev Zapasnik	242		
People's Independent Party 2002	Bradley Warren	118	3.5	
Turnout			41.4	
Labour hold		Swing		
Labour hold		Swing		
Labour hold		Swing		

=== Kenton West ===
Kenton West (3)
Party	Candidate	Votes	%	±%
Conservative	Vina Mithani	1,592	45.2	
Conservative	Yogesh Teli	1,499		
Conservative	Jeremy Zeid	1,455		
Labour	Sanjay Dighé	1,449	41.1	
Labour	Mukesh Shah	1,382		
Labour	Raymond Frogley	1,301		
Liberal Democrats	Paul Jeffery	485	13.8	
Liberal Democrats	Julie Scott	477		
Liberal Democrats	Ronald Burrow	442		
Turnout			44.2	
Conservative hold		Swing		
Conservative gain from Labour		Swing		
Conservative gain from Labour		Swing		

=== Marlborough ===
Marlborough (3)
Party	Candidate	Votes	%	±%
Labour	Dhirajlal Lavingia	1,186	43.5	
Labour	David Gawn	1,169		
Labour	David Perry	1,044		
Conservative	Bharti Solanki	895	32.9	
Conservative	Michael McKersie	854		
Conservative	Dusko Grba	784		
Liberal Democrats	Chris Modi	643	23.6	
Liberal Democrats	Jaydeep Patel	625		
Liberal Democrats	Ronald Warshaw	607		
Turnout			38.0	
Labour hold		Swing		
Labour hold		Swing		
Labour hold		Swing		

=== Pinner ===
Pinner (3)
Party	Candidate	Votes	%	±%
Conservative	Mavis Champagnie	2,117	67.2	
Conservative	Myra Michael	2,109		
Conservative	Paul Osborn	2,014		
Liberal Democrats	Veronica Chamberlain	525	16.7	
Labour	Anne Whitehead	509	16.2	
Labour	Jeffrey Gallant	489		
Liberal Democrats	Leslie Moss	485		
Labour	Anthony Smith	448		
Liberal Democrats	Michael Sayer	376		
Turnout			42.1	
Conservative hold		Swing		
Conservative hold		Swing		
Conservative hold		Swing		

=== Pinner South ===
Pinner South (3)
Party	Candidate	Votes	%	±%
Conservative	Charles Mote	2,226	63.5	
Conservative	John Nickolay	2,068		
Conservative	Salim Miah	1,886		
Liberal Democrats	Benedict Rich	670	19.1	
Liberal Democrats	Susan Boobis	612		
Labour	Pauline Egan	609	17.4	
Labour	James Coyle	591		
Liberal Democrats	Peter Fletcher	549		
Labour	Ernest Selby	537		
Turnout			44.5	
Conservative hold		Swing		
Conservative hold		Swing		
Conservative hold		Swing		

=== Queensbury ===
Queensbury (3)
Party	Candidate	Votes	%	±%
Labour	Nizam Ismail	1,371	44.3	
Labour	Keekira Thammaiah	1,340		
Conservative	Dinesh Solanki	1,295	41.8	
Labour	Abu Saud	1,269		
Conservative	Marcello Borgese	1,188		
Conservative	Terence Silber	1,158		
Liberal Democrats	Maureen Rogers	431	13.9	
Liberal Democrats	Ronald Smith	391		
Liberal Democrats	Stephen Tiley	317		
Turnout			39.3	
Labour hold		Swing		
Labour hold		Swing		
Conservative gain from Labour		Swing		

=== Rayners Lane ===
Rayners Lane (3)
Party	Candidate	Votes	%	±%
Conservative	Lily Nickolay	1,395	34.3	
Liberal Democrats	Christopher Noyce	1,319	32.4	
Conservative	Ashok Kulkarni	1,284		
Conservative	Sameer Mirza	1,230		
Liberal Democrats	Edward Tiley	1,054		
Liberal Democrats	Prakash Kaur Nandhra	1,050		
Labour	Krishna Suresh	965	23.7	
Labour	Olive Maddison	934		
Labour	Kairul Marikar	876		
Green	Rowan Langley	300	7.4	
People's Independent Party 2002	Ratan Buhariwala	90	2.2	
Turnout			47.9	
Conservative hold		Swing		
Liberal Democrats gain from Conservative		Swing		
Conservative hold		Swing		

=== Roxbourne ===
Roxbourne (3)
Party	Candidate	Votes	%	±%
Labour	Manoharan Dharmarajah	1,317	48.9	
Labour	Robert Currie	1,290		
Labour	Graham Henson	1,160		
Conservative	Louise Hall	798	29.6	
Conservative	Norman Stevenson	708		
Conservative	Mohammad Kaiserimam	656		
Liberal Democrats	John Knight	578	21.5	
Liberal Democrats	Nicola Lane	519		
Liberal Democrats	Baldev Sharma	514		
Turnout			36.6	
Labour hold		Swing		
Labour hold		Swing		
Labour hold		Swing		

=== Roxeth ===
Roxeth (3)
Party	Candidate	Votes	%	±%
Labour	Jeremy Miles	1,471	44.7	
Labour	Thayapara Idaikkadar	1,362		
Labour	Radhikaranjan Ray	1,337		
Conservative	William Diffey	1,063	32.3	
Conservative	Jeremy Brier	1,036		
Conservative	John Rennie	1,029		
Liberal Democrats	Graham Lippiatt	436	13.2	
Liberal Democrats	Suzanne Cooper	419		
Liberal Democrats	Janet Skipworth	411		
Independent	Akil Dhalla	322	9.8	
Turnout			41.5	
Labour hold		Swing		
Labour hold		Swing		
Labour hold		Swing		

=== Stanmore Park ===
Stanmore Park (3)
Party	Candidate	Votes	%	±%
Conservative	Marilyn Ashton	2,371	74.6	
Conservative	Camilla Bath	2,364		
Conservative	Christine Bednell	2,292		
Labour	Keith Burchell	508	16.0	
Labour	Ann Groves	502		
Labour	Krishna James	466		
Liberal Democrats	Sylvia Warshaw	299	9.4	
Liberal Democrats	David Podro	288		
Liberal Democrats	John Skipworth	246		
Turnout			39.1	
Conservative hold		Swing		
Conservative hold		Swing		
Conservative hold		Swing		

=== Wealdstone ===
Wealdstone (3)
Party	Candidate	Votes	%	±%
Labour	Keith Ferry	1,149	42.7	
Labour	Phillip O'Dell	1,112		
Labour	Rajeshri Shah	1,102		
Conservative	Michael Ashton	806	30.0	
Conservative	Usha Patel	790		
Conservative	Christine Thomas	759		
Liberal Democrats	Stephen Campbell	395	14.7	
Green	Grainne Byrne	341	12.7	
Liberal Democrats	Sheila O'Reilly	340		
Liberal Democrats	Mohammed Alidina	333		
Turnout			37.4	
Labour hold		Swing		
Labour hold		Swing		
Labour hold		Swing		

=== West Harrow ===
West Harrow (3)
Party	Candidate	Votes	%	±%
Conservative	Anjana Patel	1,441	42.6	
Conservative	Julia Merison	1,353		
Labour	Brian Gate	1,251	36.9	
Labour	Huw Davies	1,199		
Conservative	Chalee Wanchai	1,195		
Labour	Kausar Omar	1,095		
Liberal Democrats	Donald Clarke	561	16.6	
Liberal Democrats	Qazi Ahmad	461		
Liberal Democrats	Mary Ocansey	434		
People's Independent Party 2002	Herbert Crossman	133	3.9	
People's Independent Party 2002	Arthur Petchey	124		
People's Independent Party 2002	Manesh Padhiar	109		
Turnout			45.8	
Conservative hold		Swing		
Conservative gain from Labour		Swing		
Labour hold		Swing		
