= Brent London Borough Council elections =

Local elections in London

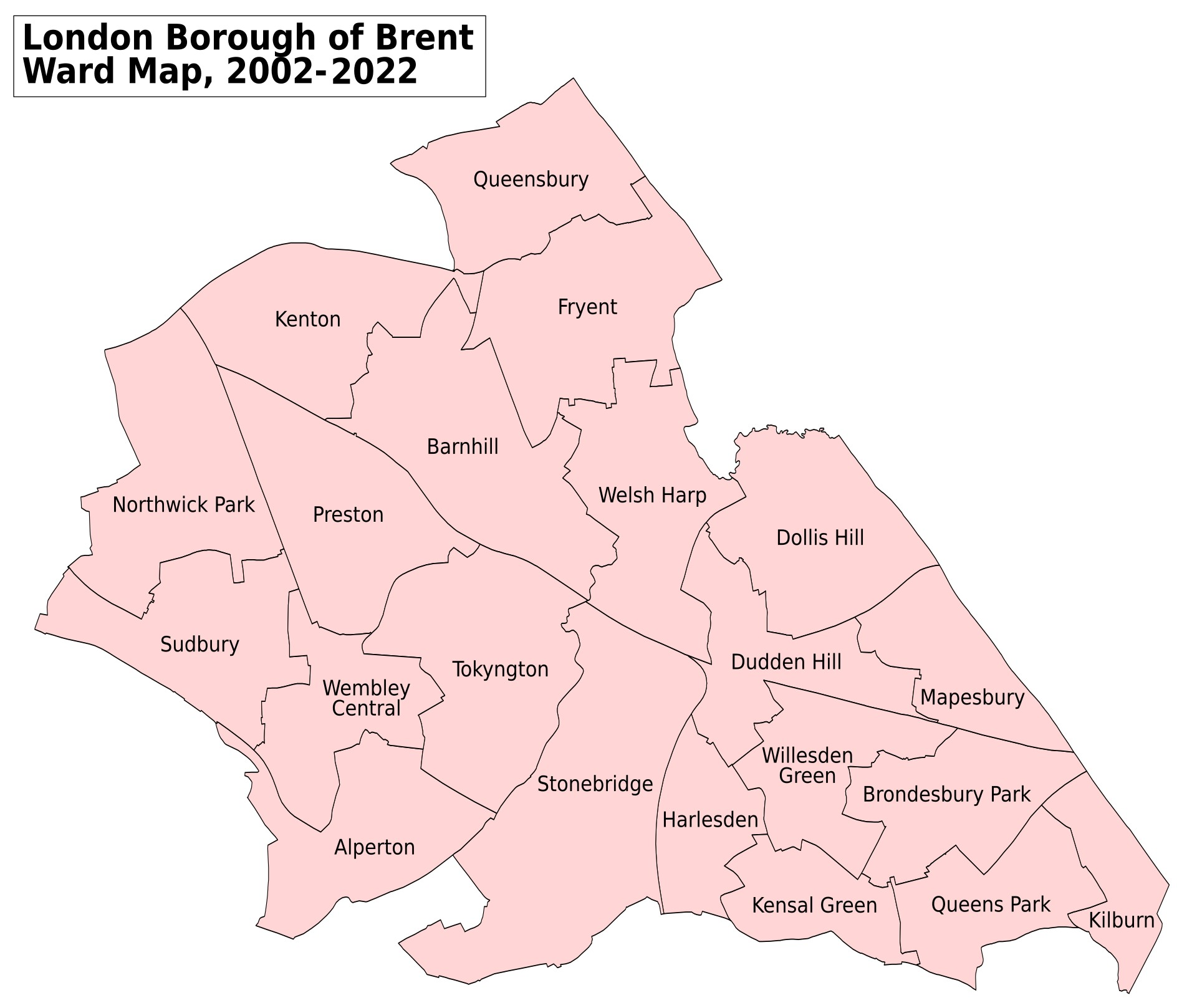
Map of Brent Borough electoral wards from 2002 to 2022

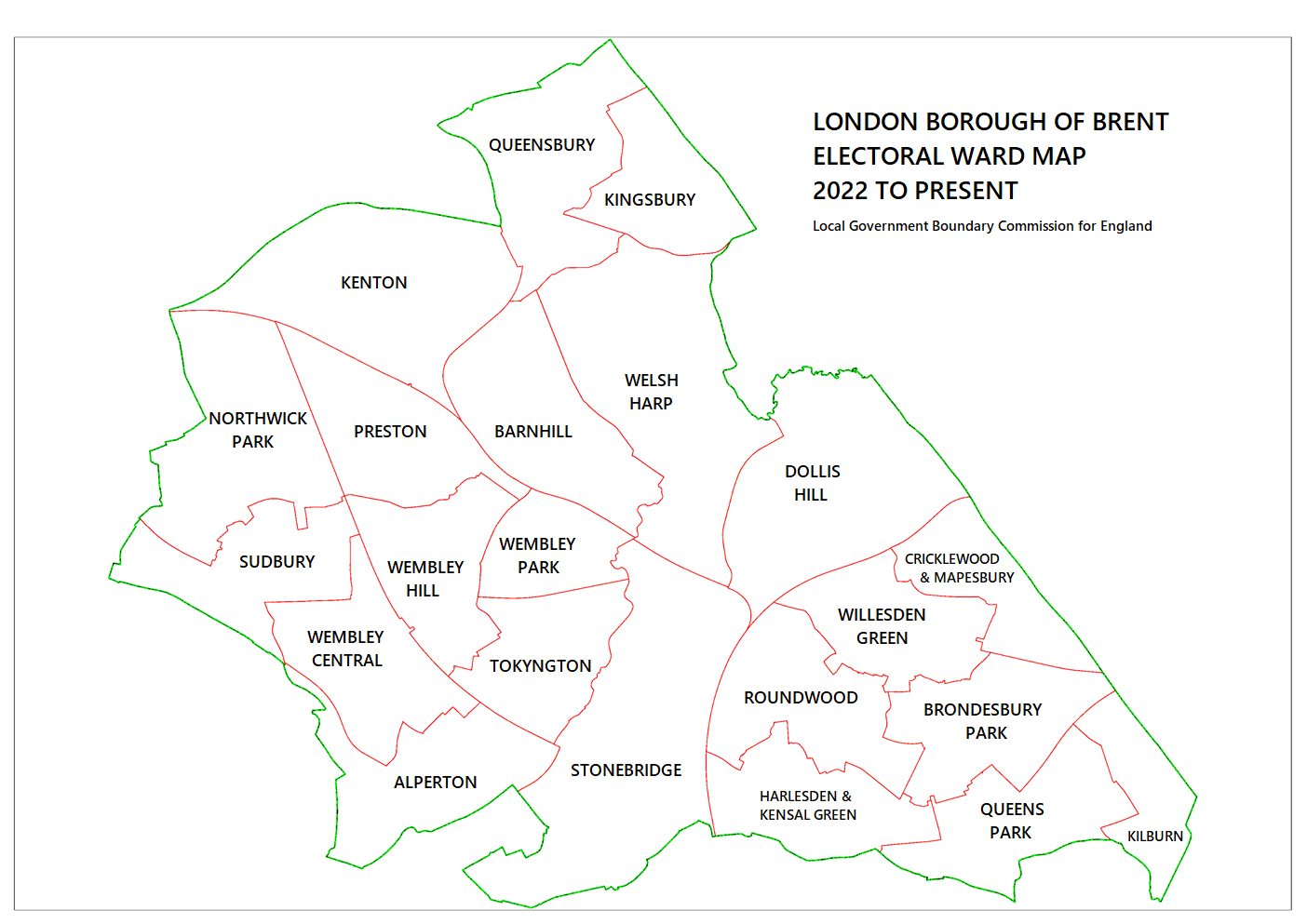
Map of electoral wards in Brent Borough since 2022

Brent London Borough Council in London, England is elected every four years. Since the last boundary changes in 2022 the council has comprised 57 councillors representing 22 wards, with each ward electing two or three councillors.

== Council elections ==
Summary of the council composition after each council election, click on the year for full details of each election.

Year	Labour	Conservative	Liberal Democrats	Green	Notes
1964	34	26	0	0	
1968	11	49	0	0	Boundary changes took place but the number of seats remained the same
1971	38	22	0	0	
1974	35	25	0	0	
1978	39	27	0	0	Boundary changes increased the number of seats by six
1982	33	30	3	0	
1986	43	20	3	0	
1990	29	31	6	0	
1994	28	33	5	0	Boundary changes took place but the number of seats remained the same (Note: The North and Central London (London Borough Boundaries) Order 1993)
1998	43	19	4	0	
2002	35	19	9	0	Boundary changes reduced the number of seats by three
2006	21	15	27	0	
2010	40	6	17	0	
2014	56	6	1	0	
2018	60	3	0	0	
2022	49	5	3	0	Boundary changes reduced the number of seats by six
2026	26	11	11	9	

== Borough result maps ==
1990 results map

2002 results map

2006 results map

2010 results map

2014 results map

2018 results map

2022 results map

2026 results map

== Results of by-elections ==
Summary of recent by-elections;

By-election	Date	Incumbent party	Winning party
Preston	30 May 1996	Conservative	Conservative
Kilburn	11 March 1999	Labour	Labour
Roe Green	27 July 2000	Labour	Labour
Fryent	1 March 2001	Labour	Labour
Fryent	16 June 2005	Labour	Labour
Preston	16 June 2005	Conservative	Conservative
Dudden Hill	24 May 2007	Liberal Democrats	Liberal Democrats
Stonebridge	13 September 2007	Labour	Labour
Queens Park	13 March 2008	Liberal Democrats	Liberal Democrats
Wembley Central	23 July 2009	Liberal Democrats	Liberal Democrats
Kenton	17 February 2011	Conservative	Conservative
Wembley Central	22 December 2011	Labour	Labour
Dollis Hill	22 March 2012	Liberal Democrats	Liberal Democrats
Barnhill	3 May 2012	Labour	Labour
Kenton	5 March 2015	Conservative	Conservative
Kensal Green	17 December 2015	Labour	Labour
Kilburn	5 May 2016	Labour	Labour
Alperton	23 January 2020	Labour	Liberal Democrats
Barnhill (2 vacancies)	23 January 2020	Labour	Labour
Barnhill (2 vacancies)	23 January 2020	Labour	Labour
Wembley Central	23 January 2020	Labour	Labour
Brondesbury Park	6 May 2021	Labour	Labour
Queens Park	4 July 2024	Labour	Labour
Alperton	18 February 2025	Liberal Democrats	Liberal Democrats

=== 1968–1971 ===
Chamberlayne by-election 27 June 1968
Party	Candidate	Votes	%
Conservative	D.A. Lazarus	1,271	
Labour	J. E. Hockey	443	
Liberal	K. Smulovitch	282	
Communist	L. C. Gibbons	29	
Turnout			30.0%

Kenton 27 June 1968
Party	Candidate	Votes	%
Conservative	A. M. Newland	1,389	
Conservative	E. I. Hughes	1,373	
Labour	P. G. Pendsay	111	
Labour	S. E. H. Lockyer	110	
Turnout			22.0%

Wembley Park 27 June 1968
Party	Candidate	Votes	%
Conservative	l. J. Scott	1,496	
Conservative	P. J. Bance	1,485	
Liberal	C. Coburn	179	
Liberal	L. F. Butcher	175	
Labour	K. E. Toller	162	
Labour	R. Feather	156	
Turnout			25.9%

Tokyngton 31 July 1969
Party	Candidate	Votes	%
Conservative	D. J. Harvey	867	
Labour	M. C. Wyatt	447	
Liberal	C. Coburn	212	
Turnout			22.1%

=== 1971–1974 ===
Carlton 24 June 1971
Party	Candidate	Votes	%
Labour	O. Boyle	1,413	
Conservative	A. V. Phipps	141	
Turnout			29.8%

St Raphael's 24 June 1971
Party	Candidate	Votes	%
Labour	I. E. Roxburgh	1,347	
Conservative	M. S. M. Read	82	
Turnout			25.2%

Stonebridge 24 June 1971
Party	Candidate	Votes	%
Labour	M. Lawlor	1,081	
Conservative	J. H. Hulyer	84	
Turnout			24.1%

Brentwater 6 December 1973
Party	Candidate	Votes	%
Labour	J. Holtz	1,112	
Conservative	O. L. Stone	528	
Liberal	L. F. Butcher	233	
National Front	G. W. Bryant	186	
Turnout			30.6%

=== 1974–1978 ===
Carlton 20 March 1975
Party	Candidate	Votes	%
Labour	Cyril Shaw	1,015	
Liberal	Patrick B. O'Donoghue	261	
Conservative	Patricia R. Gee	190	
National Front	Avril G. F. Downes	180	
Turnout			30.8

Sudbury 12 June 1975
Party	Candidate	Votes	%
Conservative	Robert B. Tredger	1,856	
Liberal	David Arthur	296	
Labour	Mary R. Filler	275	
Turnout			36.7

Wembley Park 21 October 1976
Party	Candidate	Votes	%
Conservative	John T. J. Detre	1,816	
Labour	Maurice L. H. Hoffman	466	
National Front	Avril G. F. Downes	219	
Liberal	David Arthur	141	
Turnout			35.9

Manor 25 November 1976
Party	Candidate	Votes	%
Labour	Roy W. Ley	758	
Conservative	Charles T. Knight	641	
Liberal	John H. Gover	166	
National Front	Raymond J. Marsh	134	
Independent	John C. Blackman	84	
Socialist Workers	Roger F. Cox	70	
Turnout			30.7

Fryent 10 February 1977
Party	Candidate	Votes	%
Conservative	Stuart M. Kinchyck	1,396	
Labour	Anthony J. Colman	986	
National Front	John R. Davies	270	
Liberal	Colin F. Scofield	201	
Turnout			42.3

=== 1978–1982 ===
Barham by-election, 22 March 1979
Party	Candidate	Votes	%
Conservative	Edward C. Vickers	1,583	49.36
Labour	Donald S. Smith	1,276	39.79
Liberal	John C. Hammond	218	6.80
National Front	Arthur J. Martin	130	4.05
Registered electors		8,838	
Turnout			36.5
Conservative hold			

The by-election was called following the resignation of Cllr Derek Woolgar

Brondesbury Park by-election, 22 March 1979
Party	Candidate	Votes	%
Conservative	Howard D. Fisher	1,344	58.26
Labour	James D. O'Gara	861	37.32
Liberal	Lindsay G.E. Bransbury	102	4.42
Registered electors		6,595	
Turnout			35.1
Conservative hold			

The by-election was called following the death of Cllr Ralph Fisher

Gladstone by-election, 28 June 1979
Party	Candidate	Votes	%
Conservative	Thomas P. Taylor	1,072	49.04
Labour	Alfred Z. Filer	996	45.56
Liberal	Brian A. Holland	95	4.35
National Front	Raymond J. Marsh	23	1.05
Registered electors		5,923	
Turnout			37.0
Conservative hold			

The by-election was called following the death of Cllr Laurence Coventon

Kilburn by-election, 28 June 1979
Party	Candidate	Votes	%
Labour	Peter G. Pendsay	1,089	68.75
Conservative	Richard W.J. Martyn	495	31.25
Registered electors		6,137	
Turnout			25.9
Labour hold			

The by-election was called following the resignation of Cllr Ashley Steinhausen

Barnhill by-election, 31 July 1980
Party	Candidate	Votes	%
Conservative	Helene J. Powell	1,448	70.39
Labour	Mark B. Feeny	433	21.05
Liberal	Henry J.D. Amos	155	7.54
National Front	Graham John	21	1.02
Registered electors		5,497	
Turnout			37.4
Conservative hold			

The by-election was called following the resignation of Cllr Dennis Jackson

Stonebridge by-election, 29 January 1981
Party	Candidate	Votes	%
Labour	Merle J. Amory	811	61.77
Labour	Manibhai D. Patel	795	
Liberal	Janet A. Vere	217	16.69
Conservative	John D. Atkins	203	14.84
Conservative	Clare M. Curtin	183	
NFCM	Raymond J. Marsh	87	6.69
Registered electors		4,659	
Turnout			27.9
Labour hold			
Labour hold			

The by-election was called following the death of Cllr Philip Hartley and the resignation of Cllr Michael Lawlor

Harlesden by-election, 26 March 1981
Party	Candidate	Votes	%
Labour	Columbus M. Moloney	1,268	70.88
Liberal	Paul Lorber	352	19.68
Conservative	Desmond J. Spackman	122	6.82
Constitutional Movement	Gareth D. Pearce	47	2.63
Registered electors		4,960	
Turnout			36.3
Labour hold			

The by-election was called following the resignation of Cllr Harold Tucker

=== 1982–1986 ===
Harlesden by-election, 24 February 1983
Party	Candidate	Votes	%
Labour	Dennis P. Lynch	1,433	66.43
Alliance	John S. Hale	469	21.74
Conservative	Mary S. Mitchell	255	11.82
Registered electors		4,922	
Turnout			44.1
Labour hold			

The by-election was called following the resignation of Cllr Columbus Moloney

St Andrew's by-election, 26 January 1984
Party	Candidate	Votes	%
Conservative	Chunllal V. Chavda	942	41.30
Labour	Wilfred C. Roach	843	36.96
Alliance	Alan J. Wall	496	21.74
Registered electors		5,516	
Turnout			41.5
Conservative gain from Labour			

The by-election was called following the resignation of Cllr Laurence Nerva

Kenton by-election, 23 February 1984
Party	Candidate	Votes	%
Conservative	Robert W. Maskell	2,102	71.09
Alliance	Paul D. Thomas	540	18.26
Labour	David A. Davies	315	10.65
Registered electors		6,591	
Turnout			44.9
Conservative hold			

The by-election was called following the death of Cllr Ernest Hughes

Brondesbury by-election, 26 July 1984
Party	Candidate	Votes	%
Labour	Christine M. Winter	1,187	48.45
Conservative	Mark V. Jones	887	36.20
Alliance	Bridget S. Lucking	376	15.35
Registered electors		6,296	
Turnout			38.9
Labour gain from Conservative			

The by-election was called following the resignation of Cllr Howard Fisher

Sudbury by-election, 21 February 1985
Party	Candidate	Votes	%
Conservative	Paula A. Kimber	1,209	54.29
Labour	Sandra L. Ernstoff	600	26.94
Alliance	Susan M. Jenkins	371	16.66
Middlesex Animal Rights Group	Peter C. Wise	47	2.11
Registered electors		5,937	
Turnout			37.5
Conservative hold			

The by-election was called following the resignation of Cllr Kathryn Harris

Willesden Green by-election, 27 June 1985
Party	Candidate	Votes	%
Labour	Pamela M. Jordan	1,716	74.90
Conservative	Jack J. Sayers	298	13.01
Alliance	Patrick J. Elliot	277	12.09
Registered electors		5,531	
Turnout			41.6
Labour hold			

The by-election was called following the resignation of Cllr Terence Hanafin

Sudbury by-election, 1 August 1985
Party	Candidate	Votes	%
Conservative	Leslie Winters	1,103	45.79
Alliance	Susan M. Jenkins	720	29.89
Labour	Sandra L. Ernstoff	586	24.33
Registered electors		5,994	
Turnout			40.3
Conservative hold			

The by-election was called following the resignation of Cllr Robert Tredger

Preston by-election, 17 October 1985
Party	Candidate	Votes	%
Conservative	Eric Newton	1,853	55.88
Labour	Louise D. Crimmins	793	23.91
Alliance	Barry N. Cameron	670	20.21
Registered electors		9,331	
Turnout			35.7
Conservative hold			

The by-election was called following the resignation of Cllr Robert Lacey

=== 1986–1990 ===
Preston by-election, 27 November 1986
Party	Candidate	Votes	%
Conservative	Bob Blackman	2,272	75.94
Labour	Kenneth G. Cohen	472	15.78
Alliance	Seenar Deen	248	8.29
Registered electors		9,350	
Turnout			32.06
Conservative hold			

The by-election was called following the death of Cllr Eric Newton

Chamberlayne by-election, 7 May 1987
Party	Candidate	Votes	%
Conservative	John Warren	1,173	38.33
Alliance	Peter D. Corrie	1,116	36.47
Labour	Philemon A.C. Sealy	748	24.44
Humanist	Alwyn W. Turner	23	0.75
Registered electors		5,604	
Turnout			54.68
Conservative gain from Labour			

The by-election was called following the resignation of Cllr Cedric Best

Barnhill by-election, 17 September 1987
Party	Candidate	Votes	%
Conservative	William A. Duffin	1,618	79.55
Alliance	Hilda Glazer	259	12.73
Labour	Ruby S. Nerva	157	7.71
Registered electors		5,380	
Turnout			37.83
Conservative hold			

The by-election was called following the resignation of Cllr Helene Powell

Roe Green by-election, 10 December 1987
Party	Candidate	Votes	%
Conservative	Chunilal V. Chavda	1,074	66.26
Labour	Kenneth G. Cohen	426	26.28
Alliance	Mark V. Schuck	121	7.46
Registered electors		5,692	
Turnout			28.48
Conservative hold			

The by-election was called following the resignation of Cllr Samuel Greenaway

Queen's Park by-election, 5 May 1988
Party	Candidate	Votes	%
Liberal Democrats	Mark Cummins	686	35.79
Labour	Yusuf M. Giwa	575	29.99
Conservative	Margaret Sphikas	550	28.69
Green	David Bradney	106	5.53
Registered electors		4,233	
Turnout			45.36
Liberal Democrats gain from Labour			

The by-election was called following the resignation of Cllr Merle Amory

Kenton by-election, 20 October 1988
Party	Candidate	Votes	%
Conservative	David M. Tobert	2,170	83.98
Liberal Democrats	Jason M. Moleman	264	10.22
Labour	Neil B. Nerva	98	3.79
Green	Penelope J. Day	52	2.01
Registered electors		6,860	
Turnout			37.68
Conservative hold			

The by-election was called following the resignation of Cllr Marion Leighton

Brondesbury Park by-election, 9 February 1989
Party	Candidate	Votes	%
Conservative	Albert R. Wakelin	901	47.52
Liberal Democrat Focus Team	Anthony Skelton	594	31.33
Labour Co-op	Margarette S. Quirke	340	17.93
Green	David A. Mazure	61	3.22
Registered electors		5,880	
Turnout			32.30
Conservative gain from Labour			

The by-election was called following the resignation of Cllr Malcolm McClelland

=== 1990–1994 ===
Roundwood 2 August 1990
Party	Candidate	Votes	%
Labour	John J. Ryan	583	52.1
Conservative	Dennis Okocha	387	34.6
Liberal Democrats	Navinchandra N. Joshi	148	13.2
Turnout			23.3
Labour hold			

The by-election was called following the resignation of Cllr Richard Hume.

Willesden Green 20 December 1990
Party	Candidate	Votes	%
Labour	Ahmad Shahzad	700	45.9
Independent	Sally P. Hunt	468	30.7
Conservative	Terence C. Munro	357	23.4
Turnout			27.8
Labour hold			

The by-election was called following the resignation of Cllr Hazel Baird.

Queen's Park 7 November 1991
Party	Candidate	Votes	%
Liberal Democrats	Noel A. Martin	781	42.6
Labour	John M. Pritchard	521	28.4
Conservative	Julian L. Smith	456	24.9
Green	Theresa M. Dean	75	4.1
Turnout			47.9
Liberal Democrats gain from Labour			

The by-election was called following the resignation of Cllr Jean Spray.

Alperton 17 September 1992
Party	Candidate	Votes	%
Liberal Democrats	Daniel E. Brown	1,685	59.1
Labour	Victor L. Humphrey	642	22.5
Conservative	Suresh L. Kansagra	523	18.4
Turnout			46.7
Liberal Democrats hold			

The by-election was called following the death of Cllr Mike Harskin.

Stonebridge 10 June 1993
Party	Candidate	Votes	%
Labour	Tullah Persaud	770	56.1
Liberal Democrats	Stephen T. Newcombe	414	30.2
Conservative	Smart O. Owaka	152	11.1
Green	Graham D. Woodland	36	2.6
Turnout			32.5
Labour hold			

The by-election was called following the resignation of Cllr Harriet Harper.

=== 1998–2002 ===
Kilburn 11 March 1999
Party	Candidate	Votes	%
Labour	Noel Thompson	778	64.4
Conservative	Shaun Port	292	24.2
Green	Robert Whitley	92	7.6
Liberal Democrats	Anthony Spitzel	47	3.9
Majority		486	40.2
Turnout		1,209	22.7
Labour hold			

A by-election was held in Kilburn on 11 March 1999 after the death of Labour councillor Peter Pendsay. The seat was held for Labour by Noel Thompson with a majority of 486 votes over Conservative Shaun Port.

Roe Green by-election 27 July 2000
Party	Candidate	Votes	%	
Labour	Maureen Queally	733	46.9	
Conservative	Joel Games	641	41.0	
Liberal Democrats	Chunilal Hirani	166	10.6	
Pro Motorist & Small Shops	Adele Setton	23	1.5	{{{change}}}
Majority		92	5.9	
Turnout		1,563	27.2	
Labour hold				

A by-election took place in Roe Green on 27 July 2000 after the resignation of Labour councillor John Duffy. The seat was held for Labour by Maureen Queally with a majority of 92 votes over Conservative Joel Games.

Fryent 1 March 2001
Party	Candidate	Votes	%
Labour	George Crane	950	48.9
Conservative	Alan Wall	787	40.5
Liberal Democrats	Robert Wharton	205	10.6
Majority		163	8.4
Turnout		1,942	30.6
Labour hold			

A by-election took place in Fryent on 1 March 2001 after the death of Labour councillor Lawrence Pardoe. The seat was held for Labour by George Crane with a majority of 163 votes over Conservative Alan Wall.

=== 2002–2006 ===
Fryent 16 June 2005
Party	Candidate	Votes	%
Labour	Ruth Moher	937	41.6
Conservative	Sue-Ellen Fernandes	901	40.0
Liberal Democrats	Mehul Shah	355	15.8
Green	Peter Murry	57	2.6
Majority		36	1.6
Turnout		2,250	27.8
Labour hold			

A by-election was held in Fryent on 16 June 2005 after the death of Labour councillor Asish Sengupta. The seat was held for Labour by Ruth Moher with a majority of 36 votes over Conservative Sue-Ellen Fernandes.

Preston 16 June 2005
Party	Candidate	Votes	%
Conservative	Alan Mendoza	1,109	48.7
Labour	Wilhelmina Mitchell Murray	707	31.0
Liberal Democrats	Uday Pandya	375	16.5
Green	Shahrar Ali	86	3.8
Majority		402	17.7
Turnout		2,277	24.8
Conservative hold			

A by-election was held in Preston ward on 16 June 2005 after the death of Conservative councillor Tom Taylor. The seat was held for the Conservatives by Alan Mondoza with a majority of 402 votes over Labour's Wilhelmina Mitchell Murray.

=== 2006–2010 ===
Dudden Hill 24 May 2007
Party	Candidate	Votes	%
Liberal Democrats	Pawan Gupta	1,262	39.8
Labour	Aslam Choudry	1,177	37.2
Conservative	John Warren	412	13.0
Respect	Tim Danby	160	5.1
Green	Shahrar Ali	156	4.9
Majority		85	2.7
Turnout		3,167	34.3
Liberal Democrats hold			

A by-election was held in Dudden Hill on 24 May 2007 after a seat was declared vacant, as Liberal Democrat Pawan Gupta was found to have been disqualified from standing at the 2006 election as he was employed by the council at the time. Pawan Gupta held the seat at the by-election with a majority of 85 votes over Labour's Aslam Choudry.

Stonebridge 13 September 2007
Party	Candidate	Votes	%
Labour	Zaffar Van Kalwala	1,432	51.9
Liberal Democrats	Sandra Wiltshire	864	31.3
Respect	Sarah Cox	237	8.6
Conservative	Funmi Aladeshe	177	6.4
Green	Brian Orr	51	1.8
Majority		568	20.6
Turnout		2,761	27.1
Labour hold			

A by-election was held in Stonebridge on 13 September 2007 after the death of Labour councillor Dorman Long. The seat was held for Labour by Zaffar Van Kalwala with a majority of 568 votes over Liberal Democrat Sandra Wiltshire.

Queens Park 13 March 2008
Party	Candidate	Votes	%
Liberal Democrats	Simon Green	1,242	47.3
Labour	Lesley Daisley	851	32.4
Conservative	Gurmaj Dhillon	292	11.1
Green	Shahrar Ali	239	9.1
Majority		391	14.9
Turnout		2,624	27
Liberal Democrats hold			

Wembley Central 23 July 2009
Party	Candidate	Votes	%
Liberal Democrats	Afifa Pervez	1,195	41.3
Labour	Jayesh Mistry	934	32.3
Conservative	Yasmin Butt	423	14.6
Independent	Tom Stevens	240	8.3
Green	Martin Francis	100	3.5
Majority		261	9.0
Turnout		2,892	29.3
Liberal Democrats hold			

A by-election was held in Wembley Central on 23 July 2009 after councillor Vijah Shah was sentenced to a year in prison. Shah had been elected as a Liberal Democrat but expelled from the party in 2008 after he was arrested. The seat was held for the Liberal Democrats by Afifa Pervez with a majority of 261 votes over Labour's Jayesh Mistry.

=== 2010–2014 ===
Kenton 17 February 2011
Party	Candidate	Votes	%
Conservative	Suresh Kansagra	1,063	44.1
Labour	Ellie Southwood	907	37.7
Independent	Robert Dunwell	185	7.7
Liberal Democrats	Chunilal Hirani	179	7.4
Green	Alan Mathison	75	3.1
Majority		156	6.5
Turnout		2,409	26.0
Conservative hold			

A by-election was held in Kenton on 17 February 2011 after the death of Conservative councillor Arthur Steel. The seat was held for the Conservatives by Suresh Kansagra, who had previously been a councillor for Barnhill until his defeat at the 2010 election, with a majority of 156 votes over Labour's Ellie Southward.

Wembley Central 22 December 2011
Party	Candidate	Votes	%
Labour	Krupa Sheth	1,402	48.3
Liberal Democrats	Afifa Pervez	1,022	35.2
Conservative	Madhuri Davda	349	12.0
Green	Martin Francis	130	4.5
Majority		380	13.1
Turnout		2,903	27.6
Labour hold			

A by-election was held in Wembley Central on 22 December 2011 after the resignation of Labour councillor Jayesh Mistry. The seat was held for Labour by Krupa Sheth with a majority of 380 votes over Liberal Democrat Afifa Pervez.

Dollis Hill 22 March 2012
Party	Candidate	Votes	%
Liberal Democrats	Alison Hopkins	1,205	46.5
Labour	Parvez Ahmed	1,168	45.1
Conservative	Samer Ahmedali	140	5.4
Green	Peter Murry	79	3.0
Majority		37	1.4
Turnout		2,592	30
Liberal Democrats hold			

A by-election was held in Dollis Hill on 22 March 2012 after the death of Liberal Democrat councillor Alec Castle. The seat was held for the Liberal Democrats by Alison Hopkins with a majority of 37 votes over Labour's Parvez Ahmed.

Barnhill 3 May 2012
Party	Candidate	Votes	%
Labour	Michael Pavey	2,326	56.5
Conservative	Kanta Pindoria	1,180	28.6
Green	Martin Francis	457	11.1
Independent	Venilal Vagehela	156	3.8
Majority		1,146	27.8
Turnout		4,119	38
Labour hold			

A by-election was held in Barnhill on 3 May 2012 after the resignation of Labour councillor Judith Beckman. The seat was held for Labour by Michael Pavey with a majority of 1,146 votes over Conservative Kanta Pindoria.

=== 2014–2018 ===
Kenton 5 March 2015
Party	Candidate	Votes	%
Conservative	Michael Maurice	1,097	51.6
Labour	Vincent Lo	839	39.4
Green	Michaela Lichten	121	5.7
Liberal Democrats	Bob Wharton	70	3.3
Majority		258	12.1
Turnout		2,127	23.0
Conservative hold			

A by-election took place in Kenton on 5 March 2015 after the death of Conservative councillor Bhiku Patel. The seat was held for the Conservatives by Michael Maurice with a majority of 258 votes over Labour's Vincent Lo.

Kensal Green by-election 17 December 2015
Party	Candidate	Votes	%
Labour	Jumbo Chan	931	53.4
Liberal Democrats	Sarah Dickson	417	23.9
Conservative	Chris Alley	255	14.6
Green	Jafar Hassan	102	5.9
UKIP	Juliette J Nibbs	38	2.2
Majority		514	29.5
Turnout		1,751	20
Labour hold			

A by-election took place in Kensal Green on 17 December 2015 after the death of Councillor Dan Filson, a member of the Labour Party. Jumbo Chan held the seat for Labour.

Kilburn by-election 5 May 2016
Party	Candidate	Votes	%
Labour	Barbara Pitruzzella	2,841	59.0
Conservative	Calvin Robinson	802	16.6
Liberal Democrats	Tilly Boulter	456	9.5
Green	Peter Murry	452	9.4
UKIP	Janice North	232	4.8
Independent	Elcena Jeffers	35	0.7
Majority		2,039	42.4
Turnout		4,898	44.16
Labour hold			

A by-election took place in Kilburn on 5 May 2016 after the death of Councillor Tayo Oladapo, a member of the Labour Party. Barbara Pitruzzella, also of the Labour Party, won the election.

=== 2018–2022 ===
Alperton by-election 23 January 2020
Party	Candidate	Votes	%
Liberal Democrats	Anton Georgiou	1,699	39.7
Labour	Chetan Harpale	1,304	30.5
Conservative	Harmit Anil Vyas	900	21.0
Green	Michaela Lichten	373	8.7
Majority		395	9.2
Turnout		4,303	34.0
Liberal Democrats gain from Labour			

A by-election took place in Alperton on 23 January 2020 after the resignation of Labour councillor James Allie. Harpale was suspended from the Labour Party during the campaign.

Barnhill by-election 23 January 2020 (2)
Party	Candidate	Votes	%
Labour	Mansoor Akram	1,194	45.5
Labour	Gaynor Lloyd	1,152	
Conservative	Kanta Mistry	1,082	41.2
Conservative	Stefan Voloseniuc	1,018	
Green	Martin Francis	231	8.8
Green	Peter Murry	171	
Liberal Democrats	Sarah Dickson	118	4.5
Liberal Democrats	Larry Ngan	76	
Majority		70	4.3
Turnout		2,751	22.0
Labour hold			
Labour hold			

A by-election took place in Barnhill on 23 January 2020 after the resignations of 2 Labour councillors: Michael Pavey on 26 November 2019. and Sarah Marquis on 29 November 2019. The result was challenged by an election petition from the Conservative candidates alleging irregularities during the count, however the result was upheld.

Wembley Central by-election 23 January 2020
Party	Candidate	Votes	%
Labour	Sonia Shah	1,945	54.5
Conservative	Sai Madabhushii	1,090	30.6
Liberal Democrats	Jyotshna Patel	378	10.6
Green	William Relton	154	4.3
Majority		2,039	42.4
Turnout		3,602	27.6
Labour hold			

A by-election took place in Wembley Central on 23 January 2020 after the resignation of Labour councillor Luke Patterson.

Brondesbury Park by-election 6 May 2021
Party	Candidate	Votes	%
Labour	Gwen Grahl	1,871	46.6
Conservative	Sapna Chadha	1,227	30.6
Green	Sheila Simpson	469	11.7
Liberal Democrats	Philip Alexander	448	11.2
Majority		644	16.5
Turnout		4,083	42.5
Labour hold			

A by-election took place in Brondesbury Park on 6 May 2021 after the resignation of Labour councillor Kieron Gill.

=== 2022–2026 ===
Queens Park by-election 4 July 2024
Party	Candidate	Votes	%	±%
Labour	Gwen Grahl	3,038	43.6	
Liberal Democrats	Virginia Bonham Carter	1,462	21.0	
Green	Ricardo Davies	1,329	19.1	
Conservative	Emily Sheffield	1,138	16.3	
Majority		1,576	22.6	
Turnout		4,083		
Labour hold		Swing		

A by-election took place in Queens Park on 4 July 2024 after the resignation of Labour councillor Eleanor Southwood.

Alperton by-election 18 February 2025
Party	Candidate	Votes	%	±%
Liberal Democrats	Charlie Clinton	1,743	48.5	+2.0
Labour	Prerna Thakkar	827	23.0	−18.3
Conservative	Harmit Vyas	740	20.6	+8.4
Reform	Mahendra Negi	286	8.0	+8.0
Majority		916	25.5	
Turnout		3596	33.5	
Liberal Democrats hold		Swing		

A by-election took place in Alperton on 18 February 2025 after the resignation of Liberal Democrat councillor Anton Georgiou.
