= Queens Park (Brent ward) =

- Electoral ward for the Brent London Borough Council
- Queens Park (Brent) ward boundaries since 2022
- Borough: Brent
- County: Greater London
- Population: 17,158 (2021) (Note: 2021 Census data reported for 2022 ward boundaries)
- Electorate: 12,620 (2022)
- Area: 1.655 square kilometres (0.639 sq mi)

Current electoral ward
- Created: 1965
- Councillors: 1965–2002: 2; 2002–present: 3
- GSS code: E05013507 (2022–present)

Queens Park is an electoral ward in the London Borough of Brent, returning councillors to Brent London Borough Council.

== Brent council elections since 2022 ==
=== 2024 by-election ===
The by-election on 4 July 2024 took place on the same day as the United Kingdom general election. It followed the resignation of Eleanor Southwood.

2024 Queens Park by-election
Party	Candidate	Votes	%	±%
Labour	Lesley Smith	3,038	43.6	
Liberal Democrats	Virginia Bonham Carter	1,462	21.0	
Green	Ricardo Davies	1,329	19.1	
Conservative	Emily Sheffield	1,138	16.3	
Turnout		6,967	54.41	
Labour hold		Swing		

=== 2022 election ===
The election took place on 5 May 2022.

2022 Brent London Borough Council election: Queens Park (3)
Party	Candidate	Votes	%	±%
Labour Co-op	Stephen Crabb	2,382	59.9	+20.6
Labour Co-op	Neil Nerva	2,380	59.8	+19.9
Labour Co-op	Eleanor Southwood	2,347	59.0	+21.2
Green	Sheila Simpson	832	20.9	+10.00
Liberal Democrats	Virginia Brand	737	18.5	−2.00
Liberal Democrats	Deborah Unger	647	16.3	0.00
Liberal Democrats	Robin Sharp	545	13.7	−2.70
Conservative	Monica Roberts	511	12.8	−2.20
Conservative	Salman Anwar	504	12.7	0.00
Conservative	Harry Gillow	487	12.2	+1.10
Turnout		3,979	31.4	−7.9
Registered electors		12,620		
Labour win (new boundaries)				
Labour win (new boundaries)				
Labour win (new boundaries)				

== 2002–2022 ==
Queens Park (Brent) ward boundaries from 2002 to 2022

There was a revision of ward boundaries in Brent in 2002.

=== 2018 election ===
The election took place on 3 May 2018.

2018 Brent London Borough Council election: Queens Park (3)
Party	Candidate	Votes	%	±%
Labour	Neil Nerva	1,862	39.9	
Labour	James Denselow	1,835	39.3	
Labour	Eleanor Southwood	1,766	37.8	
Liberal Democrats	Virginia Bonham Carter	1,005	21.5	
Liberal Democrats	Hussain Khan	767	16.4	
Liberal Democrats	Deborah Unger	763	16.3	
Conservative	Chris Alley	700	15.0	
Women's Equality	Emma Ko	626	13.4	
Conservative	Ellie Phipps	593	12.7	
Conservative	Nick Vose	519	11.1	
Green	Poppy Stockbridge	507	10.9	
Green	John Mansook	373	8.0	
Green	Lawrence McNally	336	7.2	
Turnout		4,057	39.30	
Labour hold		Swing		
Labour hold		Swing		
Labour hold		Swing		

=== 2014 election ===
The election took place on 22 May 2014.

2014 Brent London Borough Council election: Queens Park (3)
Party	Candidate	Votes	%	±%
Labour	James Denselow	1,727		
Labour	Neil Nerva	1,650		
Labour	Eleanor Southwood	1,587		
Conservative	Jennifer Powers	784		
Green	Alex Freed	750		
Liberal Democrats	Virginia Bonham Carter	723		
Conservative	Shaun Rosse	708		
Conservative	Abdul Alawiye	624		
Liberal Democrats	Isabella Thomas	549		
Liberal Democrats	Jonathan Bertulis-Fernandes	520		
Total votes		9,622	34	-22
Labour gain from Liberal Democrats		Swing		
Labour hold		Swing		
Labour hold		Swing		

=== 2010 election ===
The election on 6 May 2010 took place on the same day as the United Kingdom general election.

2010 Brent London Borough Council election: Queens Park (3)
Party	Candidate	Votes	%	±%
Liberal Democrats	Simon Green	2,239	40.2	
Labour	James Denselow	2,075	37.2	
Labour	Michael Adeyeye	2,022	36.3	
Labour	Michael Lyon	1,960	35.2	
Liberal Democrats	Emily Tancred	1,925	34.5	
Liberal Democrats	William Motley	1,724	30.9	
Conservative	Karina Dostalova	1,328	23.8	
Conservative	Gurmaj Dhillon	1,292	23.2	
Conservative	Florence Keelson-Anfu	1,164	20.9	
Green	Alexandra Hamilton-Freed	691	12.4	
Green	Emma Watson	529	9.5	
Green	Isobel Hurt	476	8.5	
Turnout		5,631	56	+18
Liberal Democrats hold		Swing		
Labour gain from Liberal Democrats		Swing		
Labour gain from Liberal Democrats		Swing		

=== 2006 election ===
The election took place on 4 May 2006.

2006 Brent London Borough Council election: Queens Park (3)
Party	Candidate	Votes	%	±%
Liberal Democrats	Emily Tancred	1,284	36.1	
Liberal Democrats	Jean Tullett	1,184		
Liberal Democrats	Will Motley	1,102		
Labour	Neil Nerva	1,059	29.7	
Labour	Reginald Freeson	1,055		
Labour	Helga Gladbaum	1,010		
Green	Ropert Degas	526	14.8	
Conservative	Gurmaj Dhillon	494	13.9	
Conservative	William Wearmouth	486		
Green	Shahrar Ali	462		
Conservative	Kwasi Kwarteng	461		
Independent	Rocky Fernandez	197	5.5	
Turnout		8,064	38	+13
Liberal Democrats gain from Labour		Swing		
Liberal Democrats gain from Labour		Swing		
Liberal Democrats gain from Labour		Swing		

=== 2002 election ===
The election took place on 2 May 2002.

2002 Brent London Borough Council election: Queens Park (3)
Party	Candidate	Votes	%	±%
Labour	Jonathan Davies	1,264		
Labour	Reginald Freeson	1,255		
Labour	Neil Nerva	1,193		
Conservative	Peter Denison-Pender	495		
Green	Phillip Linsdell	453		
Liberal Democrats	Diana Ayres	436		
Conservative	Valji Murji	383		
Conservative	Nirubala Patel	374		
Liberal Democrats	Eileen Barker	347		
Liberal Democrats	Ian Calder	283		
Turnout		6,483	25.0	
Labour win (new boundaries)				
Labour win (new boundaries)				
Labour win (new boundaries)				

== 1978–2002 ==
There was a revision of ward boundaries in Brent in 1978.

=== 1998 election ===
The election on 7 May 1998 coincided with the 1998 Greater London Authority referendum.

1998 Brent London Borough Council election: Queen's Park (2)
Party	Candidate	Votes	%	±%
Labour	Neil Nerva	1,038		
Labour	Sarah Walker	1,005		
Liberal Democrats	Anthony Spitzel	340		
Liberal Democrats	Robert Wharton	286		
Conservative	Wendy MacHugh	217		
Conservative	Jennifer Seaton-Brown	202		
Turnout		3,088	41.8	
Labour hold		Swing		
Labour gain from Liberal Democrats		Swing		

== 1968–1978 ==
There was a revision of ward boundaries in Breny in 1968.

== 1964–1968 ==
=== 1964 election ===
The election took place on 7 May 1964.

1964 Brent London Borough Council election: Queen's Park (2)
Party	Candidate	Votes	%	±%
Labour	J. E. Hockey	1,089		
Labour	B. Eaton	1,084		
Conservative	W. Riches	703		
Turnout		1,808	30.5	
Labour win (new seat)				
Labour win (new seat)				
