= Wembley Central =

Wembley Central may refer to:

- Wembley Central (ward)
- Wembley Central Square
- Wembley Central station
