= 2006 Brent London Borough Council election =

2006 local election in England

- 4 May 2006

All 63 seats to Brent London Borough Council 32 seats needed for a majority

| | First party | Second party | Third party |
|---|---|---|---|
| Party | Liberal Democrats | Labour | Conservative |
| Last election | 9 seats, 16.9% | 35 seats, 42.5% | 16 seats, 32.2% |
| Seats won | 27 | 21 | 15 |
| Seat change | ▲18 | ▼14 | ▼4 |
| Popular vote | 20,744 | 25,681 | 20,410 |
| Percentage | 27.8% | 34.4% | 27.3% |
| Swing | ▲10.9% | ▼8.1% | ▼4.9% |
- Map of the results of the 2006 Brent London Borough Council election. Liberal Democrats in yellow, Labour in red and Conservatives in blue.
Council control before election
Labour
Council control after election
No overall control

The 2006 Brent London Borough Council election took place on 4 May 2006 to elect members of Brent London Borough Council in London, England. The whole council was up for election and the Labour Party lost overall control of the council to no overall control.

== Background ==
Since the last election in 2002, a Conservative councillor, Carol Shaw of Brondesbury Park ward, had defected to the Liberal Democrats, while in April 2006, Labour councillor, Jonathan Davies of Queen's Park ward; also joined the Liberal Democrats. In the Brent area, the Liberal Democrats had also gained the parliamentary seat of Brent East from Labour at a 2003 by-election and held the seat at the 2005 general election. The defections meant that before the election Labour had 34 seats on the council, compared to 15 for the Conservatives and 11 for the Liberal Democrats.

== Election result ==
The Liberal Democrats gained 18 seats to leave no party with a majority on the council, but the Liberal Democrats became the largest party with 27 councillors. The Liberal Democrat gains were mainly at the expense of Labour, who suffered a net loss of 14 seats.

Following the election a coalition between the Liberal Democrats and Conservatives took control of the council, with Liberal Democrat Paul Lorber becoming the leader of the council and Conservative Bob Blackman deputy leader.

Brent local election result 2006
| Party | Seats | Gains | Losses | Net gain/loss | Seats % | Votes % | Votes | +/− |
|---|---|---|---|---|---|---|---|---|
| Liberal Democrats | 27 | 18 | 0 | ▲18 | 42.9 | 27.8 | 20,744 | ▲10.9 |
| Labour | 21 | 2 | 16 | ▼14 | 33.3 | 34.4 | 25,681 | ▼8.1 |
| Conservative | 15 | 3 | 7 | ▼4 | 23.8 | 27.3 | 20,410 | ▼4.9 |
| Green | 0 | 0 | 0 | 0 | 0.0 | 9.1 | 6,820 | ▲3.1 |
| Independent | 0 | 0 | 0 | 0 | 0.0 | 0.7 | 537 | New |
| Respect | 0 | 0 | 0 | 0 | 0.0 | 0.6 | 463 | New |

== Ward results ==
=== Alperton ===
Alperton (3 seats)
| Party | Candidate | Votes | % | ±% |
|---|---|---|---|---|
| Liberal Democrats | Daniel Brown | 1,624 | 44.0 | |
| Liberal Democrats | Chunilal Chavda | 1,560 | | |
| Liberal Democrats | James Allie | 1,481 | | |
| Labour | Harbi Farah | 1,126 | 30.5 | |
| Labour | Benjamin Ogunro | 1,061 | | |
| Labour | Leon Turini | 1,033 | | |
| Conservative | Jaydutt Desai | 790 | 21.4 | |
| Conservative | Ramnik Parmar | 699 | | |
| Conservative | Shailesh Shukla | 645 | | |
| Green | Ali Jazerli | 151 | 4.1 | |
| Turnout | | 9,044 | 41 | +4 |
| Liberal Democrats hold | | Swing | | |
| Liberal Democrats hold | | Swing | | |
| Liberal Democrats hold | | Swing | | |

=== Barnhill ===
Barnhill (3 seats)
| Party | Candidate | Votes | % | ±% |
|---|---|---|---|---|
| Conservative | James O'Sullivan | 1,622 | 47.8 | |
| Conservative | Suresh Kansagra | 1,460 | | |
| Conservative | Irwin Colle | 1,435 | | |
| Labour | Judith Beckham | 1,012 | 29.8 | |
| Labour | Shafique Choudhary | 872 | | |
| Labour | Peter Coghill | 851 | | |
| Liberal Democrats | Shashi Makhija | 386 | 11.4 | |
| Liberal Democrats | Simon Marcos | 386 | | |
| Liberal Democrats | Brenda Shuttleworth | 377 | | |
| Green | Aatif Nawaz | 374 | 11.0 | |
| Turnout | | 8,775 | 33 | +0 |
| Conservative hold | | Swing | | |
| Conservative hold | | Swing | | |
| Conservative hold | | Swing | | |

=== Brondesbury Park ===
Brondesbury Park (3 seats)
| Party | Candidate | Votes | % | ±% |
|---|---|---|---|---|
| Liberal Democrats | Carol Shaw | 1,554 | 45.2 | |
| Liberal Democrats | Mark Cummins | 1,249 | | |
| Liberal Democrats | Rob Pagnamenta | 1,075 | | |
| Conservative | William Duffin | 710 | 20.7 | |
| Conservative | Joan Padro | 663 | | |
| Conservative | John Warren | 647 | | |
| Labour | Steven Mitchell | 517 | 15.0 | |
| Labour | Robert Dignan | 494 | | |
| Green | Simon Collins | 460 | 13.4 | |
| Labour | John Iloba | 445 | | |
| Independent | Maurice Morris | 197 | 5.7 | |
| Independent | Michael Fedonos | 194 | | |
| Turnout | | 8,205 | 40 | +11 |
| Liberal Democrats gain from Conservative | | Swing | | |
| Liberal Democrats gain from Conservative | | Swing | | |
| Liberal Democrats gain from Conservative | | Swing | | |

=== Dollis Hill ===
Dollis Hill (3 seats)
| Party | Candidate | Votes | % | ±% |
|---|---|---|---|---|
| Labour | Lena Ahmed | 1,177 | 37.1 | |
| Liberal Democrats | Alec Castle | 1,079 | 34.0 | |
| Labour | Ralph Fox | 1,052 | | |
| Liberal Democrats | Richard Sisson | 1,042 | | |
| Liberal Democrats | Haththimuni De Silva | 1,021 | | |
| Labour | Abdul Sattar-Butt | 1,007 | | |
| Conservative | Manubhai Makwana | 727 | 22.9 | |
| Conservative | Annesley Abercorn | 720 | | |
| Conservative | Brian Cattell | 693 | | |
| Green | Rosie Leventon | 187 | 5.9 | |
| Turnout | | 8,705 | 39 | +9 |
| Labour hold | | Swing | | |
| Liberal Democrats gain from Labour | | Swing | | |
| Labour hold | | Swing | | |

=== Dudden Hill ===
Dudden Hill (3 seats)
| Party | Candidate | Votes | % | ±% |
|---|---|---|---|---|
| Liberal Democrats | David Clues | 1,460 | 40.7 | |
| Liberal Democrats | Pawan Gupta | 1,277 | | |
| Liberal Democrats | Chunilal Hirani | 1,195 | | |
| Labour | Mohammad Choudry | 1,163 | 32.5 | |
| Labour | Patricia Harrison | 1,099 | | |
| Labour | Michael Lyon | 1,017 | | |
| Conservative | Mohammed Alghoul | 579 | 16.2 | |
| Conservative | Jason McKee | 551 | | |
| Conservative | Manal Elfeitury | 527 | | |
| Green | Clare Homer | 381 | | |
| Turnout | | 9,249 | 38 | +10 |
| Liberal Democrats gain from Labour | | Swing | | |
| Liberal Democrats gain from Labour | | Swing | | |
| Liberal Democrats gain from Labour | | Swing | | |

=== Fryent ===
Fryent (3 seats)
| Party | Candidate | Votes | % | ±% |
|---|---|---|---|---|
| Labour | George Crane | 1,605 | 44.3 | |
| Labour | James Moher | 1,589 | | |
| Labour | Ruth Moher | 1,533 | | |
| Conservative | Jane McClay | 1,320 | 36.4 | |
| Conservative | Christie Fernandes | 1,265 | | |
| Conservative | Sean Fear | 1,233 | | |
| Liberal Democrats | Sakina Akhter | 459 | 12.7 | |
| Liberal Democrats | Rita Lyons | 415 | | |
| Liberal Democrats | Henry Wright | 369 | | |
| Green | Brian Orr | 240 | 6.6 | |
| Turnout | | 10,028 | 41 | +9 |
| Labour hold | | Swing | | |
| Labour hold | | Swing | | |
| Labour hold | | Swing | | |

=== Harlesden ===
Harlesden (3 seats)
| Party | Candidate | Votes | % | ±% |
|---|---|---|---|---|
| Labour | Lincoln Beswick | 1,410 | 47.0 | |
| Labour | Janice Long | 1,270 | | |
| Labour | David Coughlin | 1,244 | | |
| Liberal Democrats | Christopher Anderson | 470 | 15.7 | |
| Respect | Albert Harriott | 463 | 15.4 | |
| Liberal Democrats | Leslie Lewis | 410 | | |
| Conservative | Natalie Colwill | 334 | 11.1 | |
| Liberal Democrats | Andrew Scott | 326 | | |
| Green | Cecilia Litvinoff | 321 | 10.7 | |
| Conservative | Sumitra Mistry | 271 | | |
| Conservative | Smart Owaka | 254 | | |
| Turnout | | 6,773 | 27 | +5 |
| Labour hold | | Swing | | |
| Labour hold | | Swing | | |
| Labour hold | | Swing | | |

=== Kensal Green ===
Kensal Green (3 seats)
| Party | Candidate | Votes | % | ±% |
|---|---|---|---|---|
| Labour | Bertha Joseph | 1,331 | 45.4 | |
| Labour | James Powney | 1,169 | | |
| Labour | Bobby Thomas | 1,108 | | |
| Liberal Democrats | Felicity Hunt | 671 | 22.9 | |
| Liberal Democrats | Penelope Lowcock | 583 | | |
| Green | Michael Collins | 573 | 19.5 | |
| Liberal Democrats | Carmel O'Dwyer | 555 | | |
| Green | Philip Dymond | 473 | | |
| Conservative | Valerie Jennings-Trott | 356 | 12.1 | |
| Conservative | Rosaline Owaka | 326 | | |
| Conservative | Nagin Parmar | 298 | | |
| Turnout | | 7,443 | 30 | +7 |
| Labour hold | | Swing | | |
| Labour hold | | Swing | | |
| Labour hold | | Swing | | |

=== Kenton ===
Kenton (3 seats)
| Party | Candidate | Votes | % | ±% |
|---|---|---|---|---|
| Conservative | Reg Colwill | 1,944 | 51.3 | |
| Conservative | Uma Fernandes | 1,891 | | |
| Conservative | Arthur Steel | 1,828 | | |
| Labour | Robert Freedman | 1,043 | 27.5 | |
| Labour | Mary Mears | 976 | | |
| Labour | Eugene Sedze | 779 | | |
| Liberal Democrats | Jagdish Patel | 526 | 13.9 | |
| Liberal Democrats | Eileen Barker | 483 | | |
| Liberal Democrats | Deborah Sutherland | 369 | | |
| Green | Gareth Moors | 276 | 7.3 | |
| Turnout | | 10,115 | 40 | +5 |
| Conservative hold | | Swing | | |
| Conservative hold | | Swing | | |
| Conservative hold | | Swing | | |

=== Kilburn ===
Kilburn (3 seats)
| Party | Candidate | Votes | % | ±% |
|---|---|---|---|---|
| Liberal Democrats | Anthony Dunn | 1,440 | 38.9 | |
| Labour | Mary Arnold | 1,369 | 37.0 | |
| Liberal Democrats | Derek Jackson | 1,175 | | |
| Liberal Democrats | Hugh Lawson-Tancred | 1,156 | | |
| Labour | Noel Thompson | 976 | | |
| Green | John McCooke | 532 | 14.4 | |
| Green | Peter Murry | 365 | | |
| Conservative | Charles Garner | 364 | 9.8 | |
| Conservative | Cormach Moore | 303 | | |
| Conservative | Monica Roberts | 303 | | |
| Turnout | | 7,983 | 31 | +10 |
| Liberal Democrats gain from Labour | | Swing | | |
| Labour hold | | Swing | | |
| Liberal Democrats gain from Labour | | Swing | | |

=== Mapesbury ===
Mapesbury (3 seats)
| Party | Candidate | Votes | % | ±% |
|---|---|---|---|---|
| Liberal Democrats | Hayley Matthews | 1,326 | 34.6 | |
| Liberal Democrats | Chris Leaman | 1,277 | | |
| Liberal Democrats | Sami Hashmi | 1,016 | | |
| Labour | Ian Bellia | 1,008 | 26.3 | |
| Conservative | Kahlid Dar | 966 | 25.2 | |
| Labour | Rizwana Ali | 881 | | |
| Conservative | Jack Sayers | 861 | | |
| Conservative | Jennifer Brown | 754 | | |
| Labour | Mohammad Zakriya | 703 | | |
| Green | Daniel Scrimgeour | 530 | 13.8 | |
| Turnout | | 3,432 | 36 | +8 |
| Liberal Democrats gain from Labour | | Swing | | |
| Liberal Democrats gain from Labour | | Swing | | |
| Liberal Democrats gain from Conservative | | Swing | | |

=== Northwick Park ===
Northwick Park (3 seats)
| Party | Candidate | Votes | % | ±% |
|---|---|---|---|---|
| Conservative | Eddie Baker | 1,564 | 45.3 | |
| Conservative | Harihar Patel | 1,451 | | |
| Conservative | John Detre | 1,410 | | |
| Labour | Bhagwanji Chohan | 939 | 27.2 | |
| Labour | Lawrence Safir | 784 | | |
| Labour | Mustapha Ishola-Jimoh | 780 | | |
| Liberal Democrats | Toby Keynes | 682 | 19.8 | |
| Liberal Democrats | Jeetender Dass | 629 | | |
| Liberal Democrats | Deven Shah | 603 | | |
| Green | Michael O'Brien | 267 | 7.7 | |
| Turnout | | 7,567 | 35 | +3 |
| Conservative hold | | Swing | | |
| Conservative hold | | Swing | | |
| Conservative hold | | Swing | | |

=== Preston ===
Preston (3 seats)
| Party | Candidate | Votes | % | ±% |
|---|---|---|---|---|
| Conservative | Bob Blackman | 2,010 | 53.8 | |
| Conservative | Alan Mendoza | 1,852 | | |
| Conservative | Harshadbhai Patel | 1,830 | | |
| Labour | Mary Daly | 1,014 | 27.1 | |
| Labour | Robina Zakriya | 880 | | |
| Labour | Karanodakasayi Dasa | 850 | | |
| Liberal Democrats | Jacqueline Bunce-Linsell | 439 | 11.8 | |
| Liberal Democrats | Vivienne Williamson | 372 | | |
| Liberal Democrats | Jonathan Pincus | 357 | | |
| Green | Jonathan Liddell | 273 | 7.3 | |
| Turnout | | 9,877 | 37 | +3 |
| Conservative hold | | Swing | | |
| Conservative hold | | Swing | | |
| Conservative hold | | Swing | | |

=== Queen's Park ===
Queen's Park (3 seats)
| Party | Candidate | Votes | % | ±% |
|---|---|---|---|---|
| Liberal Democrats | Emily Tancred | 1,284 | 36.1 | |
| Liberal Democrats | Jean Tullett | 1,184 | | |
| Liberal Democrats | Will Motley | 1,102 | | |
| Labour | Neil Nerva | 1,059 | 29.7 | |
| Labour | Reginald Freeson | 1,055 | | |
| Labour | Helga Gladbaum | 1,010 | | |
| Green | Ropert Degas | 526 | 14.8 | |
| Conservative | Gurmaj Dhillon | 494 | 13.9 | |
| Conservative | William Wearmouth | 486 | | |
| Green | Shahrar Ali | 462 | | |
| Conservative | Kwasi Kwarteng | 461 | | |
| Independent | Rocky Fernandez | 197 | 5.5 | |
| Turnout | | 8,064 | 38 | +13 |
| Liberal Democrats gain from Labour | | Swing | | |
| Liberal Democrats gain from Labour | | Swing | | |
| Liberal Democrats gain from Labour | | Swing | | |

=== Queensbury ===
Queensbury (3 seats)
| Party | Candidate | Votes | % | ±% |
|---|---|---|---|---|
| Conservative | Kanta Mistry | 2,169 | 48.8 | |
| Conservative | Robert Dunwell | 2,014 | | |
| Conservative | Atiq Malik | 1,997 | | |
| Labour | Rameshchandra Patel | 1,568 | 35.3 | |
| Labour | Bill Dromey | 1,551 | | |
| Labour | Sandra Kabir | 1,516 | | |
| Liberal Democrats | John Lewis | 426 | 9.6 | |
| Liberal Democrats | Frank Raisin | 369 | | |
| Green | Charles Bennett | 284 | 6.4 | |
| Liberal Democrats | Anthony Spitzel | 276 | | |
| Turnout | | 12,170 | 45 | +9 |
| Conservative gain from Labour | | Swing | | |
| Conservative gain from Labour | | Swing | | |
| Conservative gain from Labour | | Swing | | |

=== Stonebridge ===
Stonebridge (3 seats)
| Party | Candidate | Votes | % | ±% |
|---|---|---|---|---|
| Labour | Ann John | 1,644 | 53.5 | |
| Labour | Dorman Long | 1,523 | | |
| Labour | Colum Moloney | 1,510 | | |
| Conservative | Ratna Kamdar | 607 | 19.7 | |
| Conservative | Harji Dobasia | 591 | | |
| Conservative | Latlji Ladwa | 518 | | |
| Liberal Democrats | Karen Brown | 464 | 15.1 | |
| Liberal Democrats | Diana Lewis | 372 | | |
| Liberal Democrats | Mohammed Khan | 306 | | |
| Green | Robert Davis | 216 | 7.0 | |
| Independent | Francis Downes | 143 | 4.7 | |
| Turnout | | 7,894 | 28 | +4 |
| Labour hold | | Swing | | |
| Labour hold | | Swing | | |
| Labour hold | | Swing | | |

=== Sudbury ===
Sudbury (3 seats)
| Party | Candidate | Votes | % | ±% |
|---|---|---|---|---|
| Liberal Democrats | Paul Lorber | 1,600 | 43.9 | |
| Liberal Democrats | Chandubhai Patel | 1,528 | | |
| Liberal Democrats | Robert Wharton | 1,327 | | |
| Labour | Wilhelmina Murray | 1,079 | 29.6 | |
| Labour | Mohammad Ahrar-ul Hodo | 1,074 | | |
| Labour | Kanapathipillai Naheerathan | 1,032 | | |
| Conservative | Milan Kamdar | 756 | 20.7 | |
| Conservative | Narendra Kotecha | 744 | | |
| Conservative | Patrick Garten | 737 | | |
| Green | Benjamin Vanstone | 211 | 5.8 | |
| Turnout | | 10,088 | 39 | +1 |
| Liberal Democrats hold | | Swing | | |
| Liberal Democrats hold | | Swing | | |
| Liberal Democrats hold | | Swing | | |

=== Tokyngton ===
Tokyngton (3 seats)
| Party | Candidate | Votes | % | ±% |
|---|---|---|---|---|
| Labour | Muhammed Butt | 1,292 | 32.3 | |
| Liberal Democrats | Peter Corcoran | 1,287 | 32.2 | |
| Labour | Joyce Bacchus | 1,259 | | |
| Conservative | Nicola Blackman | 1,247 | 31.2 | |
| Labour | Jan Etienne | 1,209 | | |
| Liberal Democrats | Fabiola Marini | 1,184 | | |
| Conservative | Bhikubhai Patel | 1,146 | | |
| Liberal Democrats | Uday Pandya | 1,113 | | |
| Conservative | Miranda Colwill | 1,063 | | |
| Green | David Powell | 169 | 4.2 | |
| Turnout | | 10,969 | 47 | +13 |
| Labour gain from Conservative | | Swing | | |
| Liberal Democrats gain from Conservative | | Swing | | |
| Labour gain from Conservative | | Swing | | |

=== Welsh Harp ===
Welsh Harp (3 seats)
| Party | Candidate | Votes | % | ±% |
|---|---|---|---|---|
| Labour | Mary Farrell | 1,598 | 45.1 | |
| Labour | Harbhajan Singh | 1,500 | | |
| Labour | Francis Eniola | 1,494 | | |
| Conservative | Nigel Fletcher | 1,137 | 32.1 | |
| Conservative | Dineshkumar Mistry | 1,116 | | |
| Conservative | Richard Lacey | 1,090 | | |
| Liberal Democrats | Diana Ayres | 537 | 15.2 | |
| Liberal Democrats | Freda Raingold | 427 | | |
| Liberal Democrats | Ulla Thiessen | 345 | | |
| Green | Ruth Breznay | 268 | 7.6 | |
| Turnout | | 9,512 | 40 | +6 |
| Labour hold | | Swing | | |
| Labour hold | | Swing | | |
| Labour hold | | Swing | | |

=== Wembley Central ===
Wembley Central (3 seats)
| Party | Candidate | Votes | % | ±% |
|---|---|---|---|---|
| Liberal Democrats | Vijaykumar Singh | 1,824 | 44.4 | |
| Liberal Democrats | Valerie Brown | 1,730 | | |
| Liberal Democrats | Daniel Bessong | 1,709 | | |
| Labour | Dhirajlal Kataria | 1,619 | 39.4 | |
| Labour | Navaratnam Paramakumaran | 1,443 | | |
| Labour | Zaffar Van Kalwala | 1,420 | | |
| Conservative | Arun Bhundia | 480 | 11.7 | |
| Conservative | Shaheen Butt | 458 | | |
| Conservative | Michael Marklew | 383 | | |
| Green | Harem Jaff | 185 | 4.5 | |
| Turnout | | 11,251 | 46 | +6 |
| Liberal Democrats hold | | Swing | | |
| Liberal Democrats hold | | Swing | | |
| Liberal Democrats hold | | Swing | | |

=== Willesden Green ===
Willesden Green (3 seats)
| Party | Candidate | Votes | % | ±% |
|---|---|---|---|---|
| Liberal Democrats | Gavin Sneddon | 1,206 | 41.0 | |
| Liberal Democrats | Mohammad Anwar | 1,178 | | |
| Labour | Lesley Jones | 1,108 | 37.6 | |
| Liberal Democrats | Afifa Pervez | 1,080 | | |
| Labour | Gabrielle Kagan | 992 | | |
| Labour | Ahmad Shahzad | 977 | | |
| Green | Simone Aspis | 396 | 13.5 | |
| Conservative | Sylvia Drab | 234 | 7.9 | |
| Conservative | Brian Simmonds | 233 | | |
| Conservative | Claire Jakobsson | 231 | | |
| Turnout | | 2,699 | 33 | +11 |
| Liberal Democrats gain from Labour | | Swing | | |
| Liberal Democrats gain from Labour | | Swing | | |
| Labour hold | | Swing | | |
