= 1964 Brent London Borough Council election =

The 1964 Brent Council election took place on 7 May 1964 to elect members of Brent London Borough Council in London, England. The whole council was up for election and the Labour party gained control of the council.

== Background ==
These elections were the first to the newly formed borough. Previously elections had taken place in the Municipal Borough of Wembley and Municipal Borough of Willesden. These boroughs were joined to form the new London Borough of Brent by the London Government Act 1963.

A total of 157 candidates stood in the election for the 60 seats being contested across 26 wards. These included a full slate from the Labour party, while the Conservative and Liberal parties stood 50 and 31 respectively. Other candidates included 16 from the Communist party. There were 18 two-seat wards and 8 three-seat wards.

This election had aldermen as well as directly elected councillors. Labour got all 10 aldermen.

The Council was elected in 1964 as a "shadow authority" but did not start operations until 1 April 1965.

== Election result ==
The results saw Labour gain the new council with a majority of 8 after winning 34 of the 60 seats. Overall turnout in the election was 36.1%. This turnout included 809 postal votes.

== Ward results ==
Alperton (3)
Party	Candidate	Votes	%	±%
Labour	T. Davies	2,393		
Labour	P. Hartley	2,392		
Labour	K. Hanlon	2,390		
Conservative	D. N. Turner	917		
Conservative	W. J. Lawrence	912		
Conservative	Mrs. M. G. Bradford	882		
Communist	P. Weiss	477		
Liberal	Mrs. R. Connor	394		
Liberal	D. Evans	383		
Liberal	Mrs. B. Jones	354		
Turnout		3,786	36.4	
Labour win (new seat)				
Labour win (new seat)				
Labour win (new seat)				

Barham (3)
Party	Candidate	Votes	%	±%
Conservative	Mrs. E. M. Lewis	2,482		
Conservative	E. W. Byerley	2,424		
Conservative	R. J. Holt	2,420		
Labour	L. W. Denny	1,719		
Labour	E. R. Friedlaender	1,678		
Labour	P. G. Pendsay	1,640		
Liberal	A. Brown	429		
Liberal	R. Connor	415		
Liberal	G. Shockett	352		
Turnout		4,601	44.5	
Conservative win (new seat)				
Conservative win (new seat)				
Conservative win (new seat)				

Brentwater (2)
Party	Candidate	Votes	%	±%
Labour	Miss N. M. Cowan	1,463		
Labour	M. Topp	1,438		
Conservative	C. W. Sibley	1,200		
Conservative	O. L. Stone	1,154		
Turnout		2,692	40.4	
Labour win (new seat)				
Labour win (new seat)				

Brondesbury Park (2)
Party	Candidate	Votes	%	±%
Conservative	V. Sklar	1,267		
Conservative	A. J. Cowan	1,263		
Labour	G. T. Macklin	842		
Labour	G. L. Whyte	829		
Turnout		2,153	29.8	
Conservative win (new seat)				
Conservative win (new seat)				

Carlton (2)
Party	Candidate	Votes	%	±%
Labour	B. Crane	1,303		
Labour	D. J. Winnick	1,254		
Conservative	R. Haslehurst	193		
Communist	L. Fennel	122		
Turnout		1,534	21.5	
Labour win (new seat)				
Labour win (new seat)				

Chalkhill (3)
Party	Candidate	Votes	%	±%
Conservative	R. E. Dinsey	2,185		
Conservative	L. Golding	2,177		
Conservative	A. E. Hughes	2,152		
Labour	T.J. James	1,707		
Labour	Mrs. J. I. Martin	1,707		
Labour	E. Simons	1,682		
Liberal	G. Phelps	1,192		
Liberal	Mrs. V. Goody	1,163		
Liberal	L. F. Butcher	1,156		
Communist	Mrs. M. E. Alcock	118		
Turnout		5,281	51.1	
Conservative win (new seat)				
Conservative win (new seat)				
Conservative win (new seat)				

Chamberlayne (2)
Party	Candidate	Votes	%	±%
Conservative	Miss R. Freeman	1,443		
Conservative	R. Ensor	1,407		
Labour	T. H. Flint	764		
Labour	J. White	738		
Communist	Mrs. M. Higgins	93		
Turnout		2,273	32.0	
Conservative win (new seat)				
Conservative win (new seat)				

Church End (2)
Party	Candidate	Votes	%	±%
Labour	W. Greenhalgh	1,263		
Labour	Mrs. I. Manders	1,197		
Conservative	I. Gucklhorn	493		
Conservative	M. Watson	482		
Liberal	J. Steel	422		
Liberal	J. Richardson	405		
Communist	R. Gournham	70		
Turnout		2,214	35.7	
Labour win (new seat)				
Labour win (new seat)				

Cricklewood (2)
Party	Candidate	Votes	%	±%
Labour	J. Cohen	1,424		
Labour	P. J. Egan	1,398		
Conservative	H. Berney	1,247		
Conservative	I. Z. Field	1,173		
Turnout		2,702	40.2	
Labour win (new seat)				
Labour win (new seat)				

Gladstone (2)
Party	Candidate	Votes	%	±%
Conservative	Mrs. B. DeMetz	1,276		
Conservative	D. J. Jackson	1,217		
Labour	Mrs. J. D. Kohane	829		
Labour	W. C. Hinkley	790		
Liberal	P. Brockman	488		
Liberal	Mario Reginald Uziell-Hamilton	465		
Turnout		2,565	43.6	
Conservative win (new seat)				
Conservative win (new seat)				

Harlesden (2)
Party	Candidate	Votes	%	±%
Labour	T. Daly	1,163		
Labour	T. D. Unwin	1,101		
Conservative	R. Cox	331		
Communist	A. Davis	133		
Turnout		1,515	21.6	
Labour win (new seat)				
Labour win (new seat)				

Kensal Rise (2)
Party	Candidate	Votes	%	±%
Labour	L. J. Rosewarne	1,328		
Labour	J. W. Buck	1,298		
Conservative	G. R. D. Holloway	296		
Communist	P. McCarthy	162		
Turnout		1,675	25.5	
Labour win (new seat)				
Labour win (new seat)				

Kenton (3)
Party	Candidate	Votes	%	±%
Conservative	W. G. Jagelman	2,959		
Conservative	E. H. Lee	2,933		
Conservative	R. A. Penny	2,906		
Labour	N. Mikardo	942		
Labour	J. A. Lane	928		
Labour	Mrs. N. Elias	907		
Liberal	A. Peagam	735		
Liberal	Mrs. H. Glazer	730		
Liberal	E. Harvey	711		
Communist	Mrs. L. Bridges	102		
Turnout		4,668	44.9	
Conservative win (new seat)				
Conservative win (new seat)				
Conservative win (new seat)				

Kilburn (2)
Party	Candidate	Votes	%	±%
Labour	I. W. Davies	1,257		
Labour	R. Y. Freeson	1,218		
Conservative	Miss M. McIlroy	365		
Communist	Mrs. L. Gibbins	183		
Turnout		1,678	19.8	
Labour win (new seat)				
Labour win (new seat)				

Kingsbury (3)
Party	Candidate	Votes	%	±%
Labour	E. H. Chance	2,062		
Labour	F. K. Martin	2,060		
Labour	H. A. E. Reynolds	2,058		
Conservative	F. E. Pratt	1,938		
Conservative	W. R. Dudden	1,887		
Conservative	Mrs. M. R. Watts	1,877		
Liberal	V. E. Bennett	606		
Liberal	Mrs. M. L. Alderton	593		
Liberal	E. C. Jackson	577		
Communist	G. Bridges	119		
Turnout		4,668	45.7	
Labour win (new seat)				
Labour win (new seat)				
Labour win (new seat)				

Manor (2)
Party	Candidate	Votes	%	±%
Labour	G. Richards	1,219		
Labour	L. Wilson	1,207		
Conservative	P. Ward	768		
Communist	J. Gibbins	178		
Turnout		2,042	29.6	
Labour win (new seat)				
Labour win (new seat)				

Mapesbury (2)
Party	Candidate	Votes	%	±%
Labour	Mrs. N. Clark	907		
Labour	Mrs. S. Goldberg	879		
Conservative	Miss B. Wallis	844		
Conservative	S. Flintham	815		
Liberal	Mrs. M. Mole	256		
Turnout		1,956	29.8	
Labour win (new seat)				
Labour win (new seat)				

Preston (3)
Party	Candidate	Votes	%	±%
Conservative	T. W. Gornall	3,162		
Conservative	R. Evans	3,137		
Conservative	A. W. Sharpe	3,094		
Labour	H. L. Dub	793		
Labour	C. C. Kent	773		
Labour	L. M. Nerva	763		
Liberal	Mrs. P. M. Salzedo	551		
Liberal	R. Appleton	539		
Liberal	H. King	513		
Turnout		4,481	43.8	
Conservative win (new seat)				
Conservative win (new seat)				
Conservative win (new seat)				

Queensbury (2)
Party	Candidate	Votes	%	±%
Conservative	R. D. Stone	1,542		
Conservative	E. G. McDonald	1,514		
Labour	S. E. Lockyer	1,349		
Labour	Mrs. L. Lesser	1,340		
Liberal	G. S. Head	837		
Liberal	Mrs. H. Tobias	832		
Turnout		3,774	53.1	
Conservative win (new seat)				
Conservative win (new seat)				

Queen's Park (2)
Party	Candidate	Votes	%	±%
Labour	J. E. Hockey	1,089		
Labour	Mrs. B. Eaton	1,084		
Conservative	W. Riches	703		
Turnout		1,808	30.5	
Labour win (new seat)				
Labour win (new seat)				

Roundwood (2)
Party	Candidate	Votes	%	±%
Labour	J. C. Baker	1,149		
Labour	H. V. Drury	1,085		
Conservative	P. Cartwright	192		
Communist	L. Burt	158		
Turnout		1,432	19.2	
Labour win (new seat)				
Labour win (new seat)				

St Raphael's (2)
Party	Candidate	Votes	%	±%
Labour	S. C. Piddington	1,027		
Labour	V. C. Haskell	1,019		
Conservative	E. Birks	180		
Communist	B. Doyle	90		
Turnout		1,259	20.9	
Labour win (new seat)				
Labour win (new seat)				

Stonebridge (2)
Party	Candidate	Votes	%	±%
Labour	R. G. Dore-Boize	1,219		
Labour	P. Whittlesee	1,208		
Conservative	Miss J. Watson	181		
Communist	T. Durkin	99		
Turnout		1,451	20.6	
Labour win (new seat)				
Labour win (new seat)				

Sudbury (3)
Party	Candidate	Votes	%	±%
Conservative	Mrs. K. E. Bowtell	2,992		
Conservative	C. K. M. Coles	2,975		
Conservative	R. Sheppard	2,925		
Liberal	Mrs. C. Coburn	1,186		
Liberal	S. Jones	1,144		
Liberal	Mrs. S. Alexander	1,131		
Labour	W. Glynn	938		
Labour	G. D. Poyner	933		
Labour	C. T. Hills	927		
Turnout		5,133	50.2	
Conservative win (new seat)				
Conservative win (new seat)				
Conservative win (new seat)				

Tokyngton (3)
Party	Candidate	Votes	%	±%
Conservative	M. J. Curley	2,184		
Conservative	Miss D. J. Cowan	2,172		
Conservative	R. B. Oldfield	2,172		
Labour	L. N. Snow	1,719		
Labour	G. R. Marshall	1,701		
Labour	Mrs. N. Henry	1,663		
Liberal	John Edward Charles Perry	971		
Liberal	D. Mooney	912		
Liberal	S. Yudolph	867		
Communist	Mrs. N. Gray	135		
Turnout		4,970	48.7	
Conservative win (new seat)				
Conservative win (new seat)				
Conservative win (new seat)				

Willesden Green (2)
Party	Candidate	Votes	%	±%
Labour	G. B. Swannell	1,568		
Labour	J. M. Sentinella	1,473		
Conservative	Mrs. E. M. Watts	444		
Communist	E. Boon	145		
Turnout		2,056	27.9	
Labour win (new seat)				
Labour win (new seat)				
