= Wembley Central (ward) =

Electoral ward in England

Coordinates: 51.551°N 0.297°W

- Electoral ward for the Brent London Borough Council
- Wembley Central ward boundaries since 2022
- Borough: Brent
- County: Greater London
- Population: 17,923 (2021) (Note: 2021 Census data reported for 2022 ward boundaries)
- Electorate: 12,486 (2022)
- Area: 1.587 square kilometres (0.613 sq mi)

Current electoral ward
- Created: 2002
- Councillors: 1968–2002: 2; 2002–present: 3
- GSS code: E05013514 (2022–present)

Wembley Central is an electoral ward of the London Borough of Brent. The ward was first used in the 1968 elections. It returns three councillors to Brent London Borough Council. (Note: Between 1968 and 2002 the ward returned two councillors.)

== Brent council elections since 2022 ==
There was a revision of ward boundaries in Brent in 2022.

=== 2022 election ===
The election took place on 5 May 2022.

2022 Brent London Borough Council election: Wembley Central
Party	Candidate	Votes	%	±%
Labour	Sonia Shah	2,658	57.4	−7.5
Labour	Rajan Seelan	2,560	55.3	−9.1
Labour	Ketan Sheth	2,388	51.6	−9.0
Conservative	Mahendra Singh Negi	1,079	23.3	7.8
Conservative	Wilhelmina Mitchell Murray	1,040	22.5	7.2
Liberal Democrats	David Johnson	896	19.4	8.5
Conservative	Riyaz Shaik	753	16.3	1.5
Liberal Democrats	Afifa Majid	658	14.2	5.4
Liberal Democrats	Robert Wharton	585	12.6	6.8
Turnout		4,627	36.8	−5.7
Registered electors		12,486		
Labour hold		Swing	-7.8	
Labour hold		Swing	-8.15	
Labour hold		Swing	-8.75	

== 2002–2022 Brent council elections ==
Wembley Central ward boundaries from 2002 to 2022

There was a revision of ward boundaries in Brent in 2002.

=== 2018 election ===
The election took place on 3 May 2018.

2018 Brent London Borough Council election: Wembley Central
Party	Candidate	Votes	%	±%
Labour	Krupa Sheth	3,210	64.9	
Labour	Wilhelmina Mitchell Murray	3,187	64.4	
Labour	Luke Patterson	2,996	60.6	
Conservative	George Fergusson	768	15.5	
Conservative	Adin Brewis	755	15.3	
Conservative	Lacey Butcher	734	14.8	
Liberal Democrats	Jyotshna Patel	540	10.9	
Liberal Democrats	Valerie Brown	435	8.8	
Green	Rohan Patel	318	6.4	
Liberal Democrats	Robert Wharton	288	5.8	
Turnout		4,947	42.47	
Labour hold		Swing		
Labour hold		Swing		
Labour hold		Swing		

=== 2014 election ===
The election took place on 22 May 2014.

2014 Brent London Borough Council election: Wembley Central
Party	Candidate	Votes	%	±%
Labour	Krupa Sheth	2,228		
Labour	Wilhelmina Murray	1,990		
Labour	Sam Stopp	1,726		
Liberal Democrats	Jyotshna Patel	1,571		
Liberal Democrats	Dhiraj Kataria	1,400		
Liberal Democrats	Daniel Bessong	1,300		
Conservative	Abirami Senthilnathan	525		
Conservative	Mohammed Ahmed	470		
Conservative	Mohammed Shaikh	402		
Green	Kolos Csontos	282		
Total votes		11,894	39	-11
Labour hold		Swing		
Labour hold		Swing		
Labour hold		Swing		

=== 2010 election ===
The election on 6 May 2010 took place on the same day as the United Kingdom general election.

2010 Brent London Borough Council election: Wembley Central
Party	Candidate	Votes	%	±%
Labour	Jayesh Mistry	2,649	50.0	
Labour	Emad Al-Ebadi	2,352	44.4	
Labour	Wilhelmina Murry	2,277	43.0	
Liberal Democrats	Valerie Brown	2,122	40.0	
Liberal Democrats	Daniel Bessong	1,977	37.3	
Liberal Democrats	Afifa Pervez	1,917	36.2	
Conservative	Shaheen Butt	1,119	21.1	
Conservative	Ratna Kamdar	1,092	20.6	
Conservative	Miranda Colwill	963	18.2	
Green	Rodney Freed	210	4.0	
Green	Solomon Agbonifo-Ezomo	174	3.3	
Green	Maya Sendall	144	2.7	
Turnout		5,335	50	+4
Labour gain from Liberal Democrats		Swing		
Labour gain from Liberal Democrats		Swing		
Labour gain from Liberal Democrats		Swing		

=== 2006 election ===
The election took place on 4 May 2006.

2006 Brent London Borough Council election: Wembley Central
Party	Candidate	Votes	%	±%
Liberal Democrats	Vijaykumar Singh	1,824	44.4	
Liberal Democrats	Valerie Brown	1,730		
Liberal Democrats	Daniel Bessong	1,709		
Labour	Dhirajlal Kataria	1,619	39.4	
Labour	Navaratnam Paramakumaran	1,443		
Labour	Zaffar Van Kalwala	1,420		
Conservative	Arun Bhundia	480	11.7	
Conservative	Shaheen Butt	458		
Conservative	Michael Marklew	383		
Green	Harem Jaff	185	4.5	
Turnout		11,251	46	+6
Liberal Democrats hold		Swing		
Liberal Democrats hold		Swing		
Liberal Democrats hold		Swing		

=== 2002 election ===
The election took place on 2 May 2002.

2002 Brent London Borough Council election: Wembley Central
Party	Candidate	Votes	%	±%
Liberal Democrats	Valerie Brown	1,314		
Liberal Democrats	Havard Hughes	1,287		
Liberal Democrats	Vijaykumar Shah	1,248		
Labour	Mahendra Shah	1,194		
Labour	Joyce Bacchus	1,068		
Labour	Tullah Persaud	979		
Conservative	Vinubhai Patel	591		
Conservative	Piyushkumar Khengar	530		
Conservative	Niranjan Pattni	491		
Residents	Macstiofain Tomas	255		
Residents	Pauline Ellington	236		
Socialist Alliance	Jonathan Hextall	59		
Turnout		9,252	39.9	
Liberal Democrats win (new seat)				
Liberal Democrats win (new seat)				
Liberal Democrats win (new seat)				

== 1978–2002 Brent council elections ==
There was a revision of ward boundaries in Brent in 1978.

=== 1998 election ===
The election took place on 7 May 1998.

=== 1994 election ===
The election took place on 5 May 1994.

=== 1990 election ===
The election took place on 3 May 1990.

=== 1986 election ===
The election took place on 8 May 1986.

=== 1982 election ===
The election took place on 6 May 1982.

=== 1978 election ===
The election took place on 4 May 1978.

== 1968–1978 Brent council elections ==
There was a revision of ward boundaries in Brent in 1968.

=== 1974 election ===
The election took place on 2 May 1974.

=== 1971 election ===
The election took place on 13 May 1971.

=== 1968 election ===
The election took place on 9 May 1968.
