= Barnhill (Brent ward) =

- Electoral ward for the Brent London Borough Council
- Barnhill ward boundaries since 2022
- Borough: Brent
- County: Greater London
- Population: 11,421 (2021) (Note: 2021 Census data reported for 2022 ward boundaries)
- Electorate: 7,993 (2022)
- Area: 2.137 square kilometres (0.825 sq mi)

Current electoral ward
- Created: 1978
- Councillors: 1978–2002: 2; 2002–2022: 3; 2022–present: 2
- GSS code: E05013497 (2022–present)

Barnhill is an electoral ward in the London Borough of Brent. The ward was first used in the 1978 elections. It returns two councillors to Brent London Borough Council. (Note: Between 2002 and 2022 the ward returned three councillors.)

== Brent council elections since 2022 ==
There was a revision of ward boundaries in Brent in 2022.

=== 2022 election ===
The election took place on 5 May 2022.

2022 Brent London Borough Council election: Barnhill (2)
Party	Candidate	Votes	%	±%
Labour	Kathleen Fraser	1,410	60.0	−1.3
Labour	Robert Johnson	1,270	54.0	−7.2
Conservative	Pranav Patel	732	31.1	+7.0
Conservative	Sai Madabhushi	705	30.0	+5.9
Green	Richard Porter	282	3.8	New
Turnout		2,350	29.2	−5.0
Registered electors		7,993		
Labour win (new boundaries)				
Labour win (new boundaries)				

== 2002–2022 Brent council elections ==
Barnhill ward boundaries from 2002 to 2022

There was a revision of ward boundaries in Brent in 2002.

=== 2020 by-election ===
The by-election took place on 23 January 2020, following the resignations of Michael Pavey and Sarah Marquis.

2020 Barnhill by-election
Party	Candidate	Votes	%	±%
Labour	Mansoor Akram	1,194	23.68	
Labour	Gaynor Lloyd	1,152	22.85	
Conservative	Kanta Mistry	1,082	21.46	
Conservative	Stefan Voloseniuc	1,018	20.19	
Green	Martin Francis	231	4.58	
Green	Peter Murry	171	3.39	
Liberal Democrats	Michael Brooke	118	2.34	
Liberal Democrats	Larry Ngan	76	1.51	
Turnout				
Labour hold		Swing		
Labour hold		Swing		

=== 2018 election ===
The election took place on 3 May 2018.

2018 Brent London Borough Council election: Barnhill (3)
Party	Candidate	Votes	%	±%
Labour	Michael Pavey	2,411	61.3	
Labour	Shafique Choudhary	2,408	61.2	
Labour	Sarah Marquis	2,403	61.1	
Conservative	Ghanshyam Boricha	950	24.1	
Conservative	Valerie Trott	947	24.1	
Conservative	Smita Mehta	946	24.0	
Liberal Democrats	Ekaterina Knight	290	7.4	
Liberal Democrats	George Morrow	277	7.0	
Liberal Democrats	Vivienne Williamson	271	6.9	
Independent	Elcena Jeffers	126	3.2	
Turnout		3,934	34.20	
Labour hold		Swing		
Labour hold		Swing		
Labour hold		Swing		

=== 2014 election ===
The election took place on 22 May 2014.

=== 2010 election ===
The election on 6 May 2010 took place on the same day as the United Kingdom general election.

=== 2006 election ===
The election took place on 4 May 2006.

=== 2002 election ===
The election took place on 2 May 2002.

== 1978–2002 Brent council elections ==
=== 1998 election ===
The election took place on 7 May 1998.

=== 1994 election ===
The election took place on 5 May 1994.

=== 1990 election ===
The election took place on 3 May 1990.

1990 Brent London Borough Council election: Barnhill (2)
Party	Candidate	Votes	%	±%
Conservative	William Duffin	1,799	74.82	
Conservative	Irwin van Colle	1,706		
Labour	John Duffy	420	16.30	
Labour	Dennis Risby	343		
Liberal Democrats	Elizabeth Kornfield	215	8.88	
Liberal Democrats	Vivienne R. Williamson	200		
Registered electors		5,138		
Turnout		2480	48.27	
Rejected ballots		4	0.16	
Conservative hold				
Conservative hold				

=== 1986 election ===
The election took place on 8 May 1986.

=== 1982 election ===
The election took place on 6 May 1982.

=== 1978 election ===
The election took place on 4 May 1978.
