= Reg Freeson =

British politician

Member of Parliament for Brent East Willesden East (1964–February 1974)
- In office 15 October 1964 – 18 May 1987
- Preceded by: Trevor Skeet
- Succeeded by: Ken Livingstone

Personal details
- Born: Reginald Yarnitz Freeson; 24 February 1926 St Pancras, London, England
- Died: 9 October 2006 (aged 80) Salisbury, Wiltshire, England
- Party: Labour

Reginald Yarnitz Freeson (24 February 1926 – 9 October 2006) was a British Labour politician. He was a Member of Parliament for 23 years, from 1964 to 1987, for Willesden East and later Brent East, with 14 years on the front bench. He became a junior minister in the Ministry of Power in 1967, and then led his party on housing policy for 10 years, from 1969 to 1979, serving as Minister of State for Housing from 1969 to 1970 and then again from 1974 to 1979, and being his party's housing spokesman in the intervening period. He continued as health and social security spokesman until 1981. His soft-left opinions made him vulnerable to the hard left in the early 1980s, and he was deselected in 1985, leaving Parliament at the 1987 general election to be succeeded by Ken Livingstone.

== Early and private life ==
Freeson was born in St Pancras and raised in the Jewish orphanage in West Norwood from the age of 5. His grandparents were Jews who came to the UK to escape the pogroms in Poland and Russia in the 1890s, but he was abandoned by his parents.

After a successful school career, he volunteered to join the RAF Volunteer Reserve aged 16, but was posted to the Rifle Brigade for training in 1944 and then passed on to the Royal Engineers in Egypt. He spent some time working for the Inter Services Publications Unit.

He worked as a journalist in the Middle East for one year after being demobbed in 1947, and his experiences made him a convinced Zionist. He continued his print career in Fleet Street, where he worked on publications including John Bull, Everybody's Weekly, News Review, The Daily Mirror and the News Chronicle. He was later an assistant press officer at the Ministry of Works and the British Railways Board.

He was married twice. He first married in 1971, but was divorced in 1983. He remarried in 1983, and is survived by his second wife, and a son and daughter from his first marriage.

== Political career ==
Freeson joined the Labour Party after returning to England in 1948. He became active in local politics, and was elected to Willesden Borough Council in 1952 and became an alderman in 1955. He served as the council leader from 1958 until the post was abolished in 1965. He chaired the shadow council of the London Borough of Brent from 1964 to 1965, and was an alderman of Brent until 1968.

He was elected as the MP for Willesden East with a majority of less than 2,000 votes at the 1964 general election, gaining the seat from sitting Conservative MP, Trevor Skeet. Harold Wilson's Labour government was elected with a slim majority of only five seats, which was quickly reduced to three. Within weeks, he was appointed as Parliamentary Private Secretary to Tom Fraser, the Minister of Transport, from 1964 to 1967, and then Parliamentary Under-Secretary of State at the Ministry of Power from 1967 to 1969. He served as Minister of Housing and Local Government from 1969 until the 1970 general election the following year.

He remained as Housing Spokesman in opposition, and his mastery of the subject made him a fearsome opponent to the incumbent Conservative ministers. With Eric Heffer, he led a Commons protest over the guillotine of the controversial bill which was to become the Industrial Relations Act 1971.

Freeson's seat was renamed Brent East in 1974, and he returned as Minister for Housing and Construction in the new Department of the Environment after the February 1974 general election, in a period of high interest rates and rapidly rising house prices. He later added responsibility for new towns, planning, land and local government to his portfolio. He retained his ministerial office when James Callaghan succeeded Harold Wilson as Prime Minister in 1976, becoming a privy counsellor that year, and retained his office until Labour's defeat at the 1979 general election. He remained on the Labour frontbench in opposition, as spokesman on Health and Social Security, but was demoted by Michael Foot in 1981. He later served on the Environment Select committee.

He was a member of the Fabian Society, supported the Irish nationalist cause, fought racism, opposed the Korean War and the Vietnam War, was a founder member of CND in 1957, and was one of five Labour MPs on the first Aldermaston March in 1958. He wrote for Tribune, and edited the anti-fascist magazine Searchlight from 1964 to 1967. He was co-chair of the socialist Zionist Poale Zion (Great Britain), but was critical of Israeli policy (e.g. he opposed the 1982 invasion of Lebanon). He criticised the British Nationality Act 1981 and Conservative policy on Northern Ireland.

He was a committed left-winger, but his soft-left views made him vulnerable to the hard left in the early-1980s. He was able to retain his seat at the 1983 general election, but was deselected in 1985 after a bitter struggle, described as "political 'murder'" in his Guardian obituary, and replaced as Labour candidate in Brent East by Ken Livingstone at the 1987 general election. "His support for Israel, said Freeson after his deselection, had led him to be branded 'that bloody Zionist and Jew'."

== Later life ==
After leaving Parliament, Freeson became a consultant on housing and planning issues. He was editor of Jewish Vanguard from 1987 to 2006, and served as chairman of Poale Zion (Great Britain).

Freeson again became a councillor in Brent at the 2002 election, but lost his Queens Park seat to the Liberal Democrats in the 2006 local elections. He died in Salisbury, Wiltshire.

Parliament of the United Kingdom
Preceded by Trevor Skeet	Member of Parliament for Willesden East; 1964–February 1974	Constituency abolished
New constituency	Member of Parliament for Brent East; February 1974–1987	Succeeded by Ken Livingstone
