= 2002 Brent London Borough Council election =

2002 local election in England

← 1998	2 May 2002	2006 →

All 63 seats to Brent London Borough Council 32 seats needed for a majority

	First party	Second party	Third party
Party	Labour	Conservative	Liberal Democrats
Last election	43 seats, 47.2%	19 seats, 35.4%	4 seats, 14.5%
Seats won	35	19	9
Seat change	▼8	Steady	▲5
Popular vote	23,108	17,523	9,206
Percentage	42.5%	32.2%	16.9%
Swing	▼4.7%	▼3.2%	▲2.4%
- Map of the results of the 2002 Brent London Borough Council election. Labour in red, Conservatives in blue and Liberal Democrats in yellow.
Council control before election
Labour
Council control after election
No overall control

The 2002 Brent London Borough Council election took place on 2 May 2002 to elect members of Brent London Borough Council in London, England. The whole council was up for election with boundary changes since the last election in 1998 reducing the number of seats by 3. The Labour Party stayed in overall control of the council.

== Election result ==
Labour lost 8 seats, but remained in control of the council.

Brent local election result 2002
Party	Seats	Gains	Losses	Net gain/loss	Seats %	Votes %	Votes	+/−
Labour	35			-8	55.6	42.5	23,108	-4.7
Conservative	19			-3	30.2	32.2	17,523	-3.2
Liberal Democrats	9			+5	14.3	16.9	9,206	+2.4
Green	0			0	0.0	6.0	3,252	+4.8
Totally Independent	0			0	0.0	1.0	557	New
Socialist Alliance	0			0	0.0	0.5	288	New
Brent Residents and Motorists	0			0	0.0	0.5	255	New
CPA	0			0	0.0	0.2	99	New
UKIP	0			0	0.0	0.1	76	New

The above totals include the delayed election in Northwick Park on 13 June 2002.

== Ward results ==
Alperton (3 seats)
Party	Candidate	Votes	%	±%
Liberal Democrats	Daniel Brown	1,623		
Liberal Democrats	Chunilal Chavda	1,553		
Liberal Democrats	James Allie	1,522		
Labour	Ronald Collman	991		
Labour	Anirudh Sharma	944		
Labour	Leon Turini	857		
Conservative	Mistry Dineshkumar	432		
Conservative	Edward Baker	392		
Conservative	Shaheen Butt	381		
Turnout		8,695	37.3	

Barnhill (3 seats)
Party	Candidate	Votes	%	±%
Conservative	James O'Sullivan	1,591		
Conservative	Irwin Colle	1,518		
Conservative	Suresh Kansagra	1,501		
Labour	Pauline Webb	894		
Labour	Iftikhar Ahmad	890		
Labour	Maureen Queally	860		
Liberal Democrats	Simon Aronowitz	255		
Liberal Democrats	Geoffrey Mansfield	244		
Liberal Democrats	Ulla Thiessen	209		
Green	Mohammed Khan	205		
Turnout		8,167	32.9	

Brondesbury Park (3 seats)
Party	Candidate	Votes	%	±%
Conservative	Carol Shaw	1,263		
Conservative	William Duffin	994		
Conservative	Carishma Gillani	990		
Labour	Bryan Stark	828		
Labour	Christopher Anyadi	822		
Labour	Yusuf Giwa	736		
Green	Robert Davis	333		
Liberal Democrats	Jonathan Pincus	273		
Liberal Democrats	Susan Reynolds	272		
Liberal Democrats	Rosemarie Walters	220		
Turnout		6,731	29.0	

Dollis Hill (3 seats)
Party	Candidate	Votes	%	±%
Labour	Ralph Fox	1,188		
Labour	Abdul Sattar-Butt	1,161		
Labour	Cyril McGovern	1,124		
Conservative	Richard Lacey	801		
Conservative	Manubhai Makwana	741		
Conservative	Jennifer Seaton-Brown	737		
Liberal Democrats	Farooq Chaudhry	209		
Liberal Democrats	Derek Jackson	164		
Green	Peter Murry	160		
Liberal Democrats	Gisele Sukhram	151		
Turnout		6,436	29.6	

Dudden Hill (3 seats)
Party	Candidate	Votes	%	±%
Labour	Michael Lyon	1,206		
Labour	Bobby Thomas	1,182		
Labour	Izaharul Halder	1,178		
Conservative	John Warren	752		
Conservative	Brian Simmonds	735		
Conservative	Harry Quainoo	699		
Independent	Claire Fitzpatrick	282		
Green	Brian Orr	264		
Liberal Democrats	Rita Lyons	247		
Liberal Democrats	Jagdish Patel	200		
Liberal Democrats	Nathalal Hingorani	179		
Turnout		6,924	28.2	

Fryent (3 seats)
Party	Candidate	Votes	%	±%
Labour	George Crane	1,279		
Labour	James Moher	1,225		
Labour	Asish Sengupta	1,148		
Conservative	Jayeshkumar Patel	942		
Conservative	Amrish Patel	941		
Conservative	Mohammad Rizvi	810		
Liberal Democrats	Karen Brown	309		
Liberal Democrats	Chunilal Hirani	263		
Liberal Democrats	Diana Lewis	259		
Green	Cilona O'Conaill	173		
Turnout		7,349	32.0	

Harlesden (3 seats)
Party	Candidate	Votes	%	±%
Labour	Lincoln Beswick	1,138		
Labour	David Coughlin	1,106		
Labour	Mohammad Zakriya	827		
Conservative	Nirmal Patel	317		
Conservative	Anikumar Khengar	294		
Independent	James Fitzpatrick	275		
Conservative	Smart Owaka	272		
Socialist Alliance	Roger Cox	229		
Green	Ursula Troche	199		
Independent	Pawan Gupta	191		
Liberal Democrats	Elizabeth Kornfeld	164		
Liberal Democrats	Rodney Saunders	141		
Liberal Democrats	Brenda Shuttleworth	133		
Turnout		5,286	22.0	

Kensal Green (3 seats)
Party	Candidate	Votes	%	±%
Labour	Bertha Joseph	1,157		
Labour	Helga Gladbaum	1,017		
Labour	Charles Lemmon	1,008		
Green	Philip Dymond	303		
Conservative	Nagin Parmar	292		
Conservative	Kenneth Sinclair	280		
Conservative	Rosaline Owaka	273		
Liberal Democrats	Donald MacArthur	258		
Green	Michael Wilkinson	239		
Liberal Democrats	Geoffrey Walley	209		
Liberal Democrats	Bernard Luby	181		
Turnout		5,217	22.5	

Kenton (3 seats)
Party	Candidate	Votes	%	±%
Conservative	Reginald Colwill	1,712		
Conservative	Uma Fernandes	1,668		
Conservative	Arthur Steel	1,660		
Labour	Mary Daly	1,042		
Labour	Paul Ejiofor	946		
Labour	Akberkhan Sarguroh	850		
Liberal Democrats	Henry Wright	276		
Liberal Democrats	Jane Flores	269		
Liberal Democrats	Penelope Lowcock	214		
Turnout		8,637	34.5	

Kilburn (3 seats)
Party	Candidate	Votes	%	±%
Labour	Mary Arnold	1,368		
Labour	Mary Cribbin	1,181		
Labour	Noel Thompson	1,080		
Liberal Democrats	Christopher Anderson	430		
Green	Donald Lowe	355		
Liberal Democrats	Bridget Kelly	331		
Conservative	Shane Andrews	310		
Conservative	Christine Baddeley	286		
Liberal Democrats	Freda Raingold	252		
Conservative	Hari Ray	232		
Turnout		5,825	20.9	

Mapesbury (3 seats)
Party	Candidate	Votes	%	±%
Labour	Ian Bellia	1,177		
Labour	Janice Long	1,165		
Conservative	Jack Sayers	1,026		
Conservative	Sarah Macken	985		
Labour	James Powney	984		
Conservative	Khalid Dar	942		
Green	Sabrina Doyle	387		
Liberal Democrats	Robert Wenley	304		
Liberal Democrats	William Motley	246		
Liberal Democrats	Andrew Scott	223		
Turnout		7,439	27.8	

Preston (3 seats)
Party	Candidate	Votes	%	±%
Conservative	Robert Blackman	1,685		
Conservative	Harshadbhai Patel	1,644		
Conservative	Thomas Taylor	1,615		
Labour	Mary Mears	923		
Labour	James Dudley	914		
Labour	John Poole	865		
Liberal Democrats	Jacqueline Bunce-Linsell	255		
Liberal Democrats	Pearl Raisin	246		
Liberal Democrats	Tom Krosing	230		
Turnout		8,377	33.9	

Queen's Park (3 seats)
Party	Candidate	Votes	%	±%
Labour	Jonathan Davies	1,264		
Labour	Reginald Freeson	1,255		
Labour	Neil Nerva	1,193		
Conservative	Peter Denison-Pender	495		
Green	Phillip Linsdell	453		
Liberal Democrats	Diana Ayres	436		
Conservative	Valji Murji	383		
Conservative	Nirubala Patel	374		
Liberal Democrats	Eileen Barker	347		
Liberal Democrats	Ian Calder	283		
Turnout		6,483	25.0	

Queensbury (3 seats)
Party	Candidate	Votes	%	±%
Labour	Bill Dromey	1,757		
Labour	Rameshchandra Patel	1,707		
Labour	Sandra Kabir	1,583		
Conservative	Yogesh Joshee	1,069		
Conservative	Kanesh Patel	994		
Conservative	Venilal Vaghela	974		
Liberal Democrats	Jyotshna Patel	333		
Liberal Democrats	Marjorie Bonfield	319		
Liberal Democrats	Vivienne Williamson	303		
Turnout		9,039	36.1	

Stonebridge (3 seats)
Party	Candidate	Votes	%	±%
Labour	Ann John	1,325		
Labour	Sebastian Long	1,286		
Labour	Columbus Moloney	1,217		
Conservative	Harji Dabasia	710		
Conservative	Girish Patel	707		
Conservative	Lalji Ladwa	675		
Liberal Democrats	Candida Davies	187		
Liberal Democrats	Sashi Makhjia	142		
Liberal Democrats	Richard Thomas	142		
CPA	Donald Graham	99		
Turnout		6,490	23.8	

Sudbury (3 seats)
Party	Candidate	Votes	%	±%
Liberal Democrats	Paul Lorber	1,613		
Liberal Democrats	Chandubhai Patel	1,492		
Liberal Democrats	Robert Wharton	1,381		
Labour	Mohammad Hoda	815		
Labour	Francis Holly	760		
Labour	William Mears	729		
Conservative	Christie Fernandes	704		
Conservative	Aroon Rana	689		
Conservative	Michelle Keller	646		
Turnout		8,829	37.8	

Tokyngton (3 seats)
Party	Candidate	Votes	%	±%
Conservative	Nicola Blackman	1,376		
Conservative	Bhiku Patel	1,267		
Conservative	Natalie Colwill	1,244		
Labour	Alec Castle	1,237		
Labour	Orugbani Douglas	1,203		
Labour	Ketan Sheth	1,130		
Liberal Democrats	Arvindbhai Patel	277		
Liberal Democrats	Leslie Lewis	241		
Liberal Democrats	Anthony Spitzel	170		
Turnout		8,145	34.3	

Welsh Harp (3 seats)
Party	Candidate	Votes	%	±%
Labour	Richard Harrod	1,292		
Labour	Mary Farrell	1,257		
Labour	Harbhajan Singh	1,192		
Conservative	Cormach Moore	1,107		
Conservative	Alan Wall	1,067		
Conservative	Ratilal Shah	1,066		
Liberal Democrats	Christopher Queen	209		
Liberal Democrats	Hermione Raven	186		
Green	Timothy Turner	174		
Liberal Democrats	Deborah Sutherland	163		
UKIP	Alan Samson	76		
Turnout		7,789	33.6	

Wembley Central (3 seats)
Party	Candidate	Votes	%	±%
Liberal Democrats	Valerie Brown	1,314		
Liberal Democrats	Havard Hughes	1,287		
Liberal Democrats	Vijaykumar Shah	1,248		
Labour	Mahendra Shah	1,194		
Labour	Joyce Bacchus	1,068		
Labour	Tullah Persaud	979		
Conservative	Vinubhai Patel	591		
Conservative	Piyushkumar Khengar	530		
Conservative	Niranjan Pattni	491		
Residents	Macstiofain Tomas	255		
Residents	Pauline Ellington	236		
Socialist Alliance	Jonathan Hextall	59		
Turnout		9,252	39.9	

Willesden Green (3 seats)
Party	Candidate	Votes	%	±%
Labour	Lesley Jones	1,033		
Labour	Gabrielle Kagan	978		
Labour	Ahmed Shahzad	855		
Conservative	Richard Blackmore	348		
Conservative	Abdul Raja	299		
Conservative	Talhat Rehman	273		
Green	Simone Aspis	246		
Liberal Democrats	Martin Davies	234		
Green	Timothy Hoy	211		
Liberal Democrats	Carmel O'Dwyer	199		
Liberal Democrats	Azwar Mohammed	173		
Turnout		4,849	22.2	

=== Northwick Park delayed election ===
The election in Northwick Park was delayed until 13 June 2002 after the death of one of the Liberal Democrat candidates. All 3 seats were won by the Conservative party.

Northwick Park (3 seats)
Party	Candidate	Votes	%	±%
Conservative	Neil Rands	1,355		
Conservative	Gerhard Fiegel	1,340		
Conservative	Harihar Patel	1,321		
Labour	Sylvia Collins	922		
Labour	Mary Daly	831		
Labour	Singarayer Joanes	763		
Liberal Democrats	Jyotshna Patel	529		
Liberal Democrats	Diana Ayres	489		
Liberal Democrats	Derek Jackson	488		
Green	Donald Lowe	64		
Green	Peter Murry	63		
Green	Timothy Turner	60		
Turnout		8,225	31.9	
