= 1968 United Kingdom local elections =

Elections in the United Kingdom

The 1968 United Kingdom local elections took place in 1968.

== England ==
=== London ===
- Barking
- Barnet
- Bexley
- Brent
- Bromley
- Camden
- Croydon
- Ealing
- Enfield
- Greenwich
- Hackney
- Hammersmith
- Haringey
- Harrow
- Havering
- Hillingdon
- Hounslow
- Islington
- Kensington and Chelsea
- Kingston upon Thames
- Lambeth
- Lewisham
- Merton
- Newham
- Redbridge
- Richmond upon Thames
- Southwark
- Sutton
- Tower Hamlets
- Waltham Forest
- Wandsworth
- Westminster

=== Outside London ===
- Altrincham
- Hale
- Leeds
- Liverpool
- Manchester
- Sale
- Salford
- Sheffield
- Stretford

== Scotland ==
- Edinburgh
- Glasgow

== See also ==
- 1968 in the United Kingdom
