= List of elections in 1968 =

The following elections occurred in 1968.

== Africa ==
- May 1968 Dahomeyan presidential election
- July 1968 Dahomeyan presidential election
- 1968 Dahomeyan constitutional referendum
- 1968 Spanish Guinean general election
- 1968 Guinean general election
- 1968 Senegalese general election
- 1968 South African presidential election
- 1968 Sudanese parliamentary election
- 1968 Turkish local elections
- 1968 Zambian general election

== Asia ==
- 1968 Cypriot presidential election
- 1968 Japanese House of Councillors election
- 1968 Iranian local elections
- 1968 Israeli presidential election
- 1968 Lebanese general election
- 1968 Indonesian presidential election
- 1968 Maldivian presidential election
- 1968 Maldivian constitutional referendum
- 1968 Singaporean general election
- 1968 Turkish local elections

== Europe ==
- 1968 Belgian general election
- 1968 Czechoslovak presidential election
- 1968 Danish parliamentary election
- 1968 East German constitutional referendum
- 1968 Finnish presidential election
- 1968 Greek constitutional referendum
- 1968 Icelandic presidential election
- 1968 Irish constitutional referendums
- 1968 Italian general election
- 1968 Liechtenstein referendums
- 1968 Luxembourg general election
- 1968 Monegasque general election
- 1968 Swedish general election
- 1968 Swiss referendums

=== France ===
- 1968 French legislative election

=== United Kingdom ===
- 1968 Acton by-election
- 1968 Bassetlaw by-election
- 1968 Caerphilly by-election
- 1968 Dudley by-election
- 1968 London local elections
- 1968 Meriden by-election
- 1968 Nelson and Colne by-election
- 1968 New Forest by-election
- 1968 Oldham West by-election
- 1968 Sheffield Brightside by-election
- 1968 Warwick and Leamington by-election
- 1968 United Kingdom local elections

== Americas ==
- 1968 Panamanian general election
- 1968 Salvadoran legislative election
- 1968 Venezuelan presidential election

=== Canada ===
- 1968 Social Credit Party of Alberta leadership election
- 1968 Canadian federal election
- 1968 Edmonton municipal election
- 1968 Liberal Party of Canada leadership election

=== United States ===
- 1968 United States elections
- 1968 United States presidential election

==== United States lieutenant gubernatorial ====
- 1968 Delaware lieutenant gubernatorial election
- 1968 Illinois lieutenant gubernatorial election
- 1968 Missouri lieutenant gubernatorial election
- 1968 North Carolina lieutenant gubernatorial election
- 1968 Texas lieutenant gubernatorial election
- 1968 Wisconsin lieutenant gubernatorial election

==== United States gubernatorial ====
- 1968 Arizona gubernatorial election
- 1968 Arkansas gubernatorial election
- 1968 Delaware gubernatorial election
- 1968 Illinois gubernatorial election
- 1968 Indiana gubernatorial election
- 1968 Iowa gubernatorial election
- 1968 Kansas gubernatorial election
- 1968 Louisiana gubernatorial election
- 1968 Missouri gubernatorial election
- 1968 Montana gubernatorial election
- 1968 New Hampshire gubernatorial election
- 1968 New Mexico gubernatorial election
- 1968 North Carolina gubernatorial election
- 1968 North Dakota gubernatorial election
- 1968 Rhode Island gubernatorial election
- 1968 Texas gubernatorial election
- 1968 United States gubernatorial elections
- 1968 Utah gubernatorial election
- 1968 Vermont gubernatorial election
- 1968 Washington gubernatorial election
- 1968 West Virginia gubernatorial election
- 1968 Wisconsin gubernatorial election

==== United States House of Representatives ====
- 1968 United States House of Representatives elections

==== United States Senate ====
- 1968 United States Senate elections
- 1968 United States Senate election in Alabama
- 1968 United States Senate election in Alaska
- 1968 United States Senate election in Arizona
- 1968 United States Senate election in Arkansas
- 1968 United States Senate election in California
- 1968 United States Senate election in Colorado
- 1968 United States Senate election in Connecticut
- 1968 United States Senate election in Florida
- 1968 United States Senate election in Georgia
- 1968 United States Senate election in Hawaii
- 1968 United States Senate election in Idaho
- 1968 United States Senate election in Illinois
- 1968 United States Senate election in Indiana
- 1968 United States Senate election in Iowa
- 1968 United States Senate election in Kansas
- 1968 United States Senate election in Kentucky
- 1968 United States Senate election in Louisiana
- 1968 United States Senate election in Maryland
- 1968 United States Senate election in Missouri
- 1968 United States Senate election in Nevada
- 1968 United States Senate election in New Hampshire
- 1968 United States Senate election in New York
- 1968 United States Senate election in North Carolina
- 1968 United States Senate election in North Dakota
- 1968 United States Senate election in Ohio
- 1968 United States Senate election in Oklahoma
- 1968 United States Senate election in Oregon
- 1968 United States Senate election in Pennsylvania
- 1968 United States Senate election in South Carolina
- 1968 United States Senate election in South Dakota
- 1968 United States Senate election in Utah
- 1968 United States Senate election in Vermont
- 1968 United States Senate election in Washington
- 1968 United States Senate election in Wisconsin

==== United States mayoral elections ====
- 1968 Auburn, Alabama municipal elections
- 1968 Sioux Falls mayoral special election

== Oceania ==
- 1968 Cook Islands general election
- 1968 Fijian by-elections
- 1968 Nauruan parliamentary election

=== Australia ===
- 1968 Millicent state by-election
- 1968 Higgins by-election
- 1968 New South Wales state election
- 1968 South Australian state election
- 1968 Tasmanian casino referendum
- 1968 Western Australian state election

== South America ==
=== Falkland Islands ===
- 1968 Falkland Islands general election
