= 1968 London local elections =

- 9 May 1968

All 1,863 on all 32 London boroughs
- Turnout: 35.8%
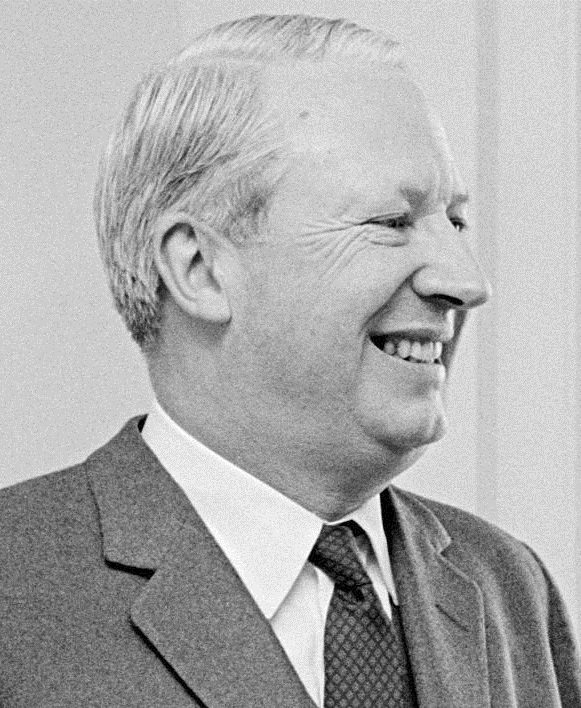

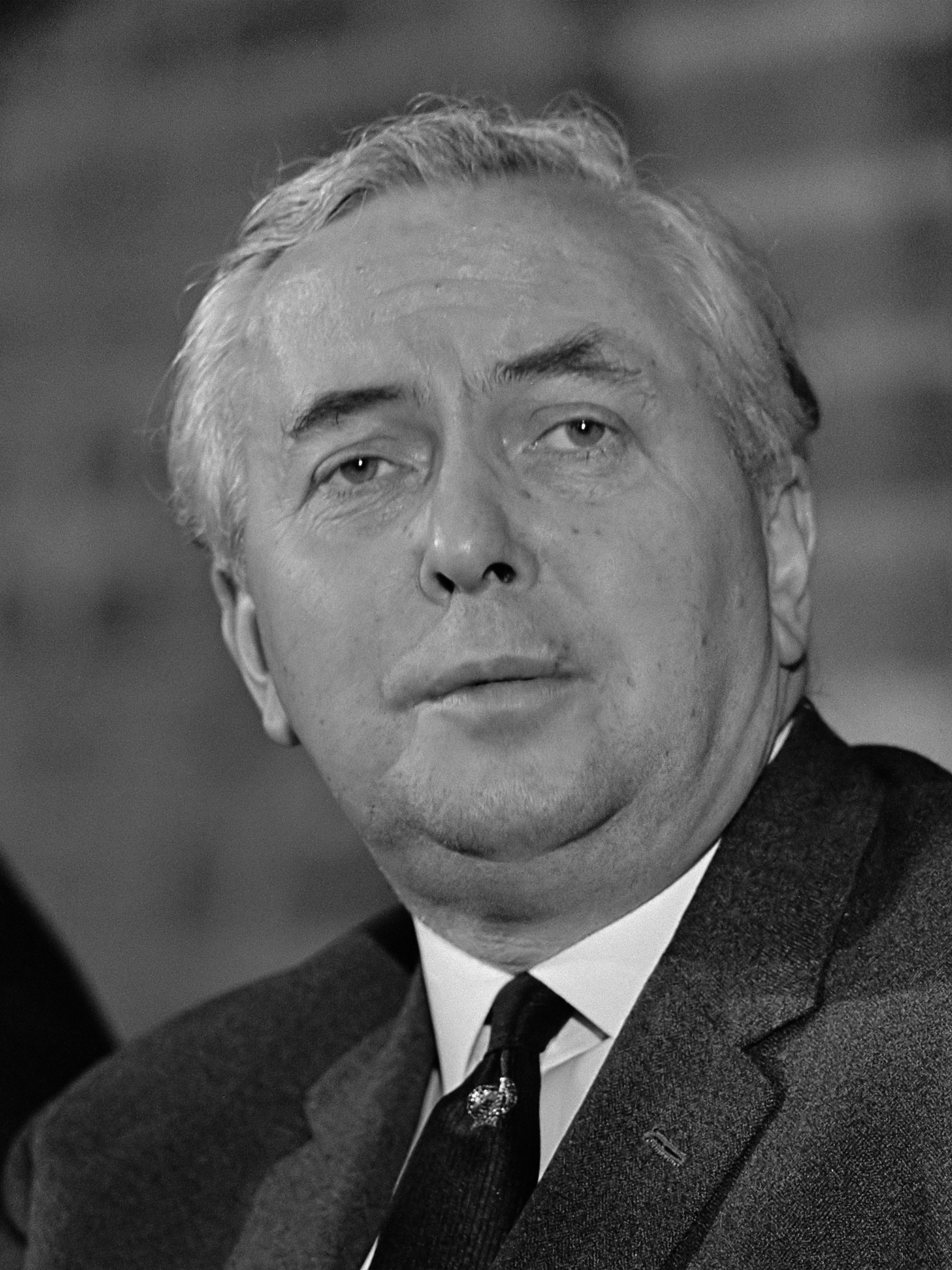
	First party	Second party
Leader	Edward Heath	Harold Wilson
Party	Conservative	Labour
Leader since	27 July 1965	14 February 1963
Councils	28	3
Councils +/–	▲19	▼17
Councillors	1,438	350
Councillors +/–	▲770	▼668
- Results by Borough in 1968. (Red indicates Labour, blue indicates the Conservatives and black indicates No Overall Control)

Local government elections were held in the thirty-two London boroughs on Thursday 9 May 1968. Polling stations were open between 8 am and 9 pm.

All seats were up for election. The result was a landslide for the Conservative Party, who won twenty-eight of the boroughs, while Labour lost control of seventeen of the twenty boroughs it had held going into the elections (including Bexley, where it did not win a single seat). Only ten Liberal councillors were elected in London.

The result followed the Conservative gain of the Greater London Council in the elections the previous year.

== Aldermanic elections ==
Until 1978, each council had aldermen, in the ratio of one aldermen to six councillors. Following the elections, each council elected half of its aldermen, who served until 1974. The remaining aldermen had been elected in 1964 and would serve until 1971. This only affected political control in Newham, which remained Labour-held after the election of aldermen.

== Results summary ==
Party	Councillors	Change	Councils	Change
Conservative	1,438	+770	28	+19
Labour	350	-668	3	-17
Liberal	10	-6	0	±0
Residents	36	-13	0	±0
Independent	26	+15	0	±0
Communist	3	±0	0	±0
Others	0	±0	0	±0
No overall control	n/a	n/a	1	-2

- Turnout: 1,876,698 voters cast ballots, a turnout of 35.8%.

== Council results ==
Summary of council election results:

	Previous control	New control	Conservative	Labour	Liberal	Others	Details
Barking	Labour	Labour	13	32	-	4	Details
Barnet	Conservative	Conservative	56	3	1	-	Details
Bexley	Labour	Conservative	55	-	-	1	Details
Brent	Labour	Conservative	49	11	-	-	Details
Bromley	Conservative	Conservative	52	5	3	-	Details
Camden	Labour	Conservative	42	18	-	-	Details
Croydon	NOC	Conservative	47	1	1	11	Details
Ealing	Labour	Conservative	53	5	-	2	Details
Enfield	Labour	Conservative	51	9	-	-	Details
Greenwich	Labour	Conservative	38	22	-	-	Details
Hackney	Labour	Conservative	31	27	2	-	Details
Hammersmith	Labour	Conservative	54	6	-	-	Details
Haringey	Labour	Conservative	53	7	-	-	Details
Harrow	Conservative	Conservative	56	-	-	-	Details
Havering	NOC	Conservative	35	7	-	13	Details
Hillingdon	Labour	Conservative	60	-	-	-	Details
Hounslow	Labour	Conservative	53	7	-	-	Details
Islington	Labour	Conservative	47	10	-	3	Details
Kensington and Chelsea	Conservative	Conservative	57	3	-	-	Details
Kingston upon Thames	Conservative	Conservative	59	1	-	-	Details
Lambeth	Labour	Conservative	57	3	-	-	Details
Lewisham	Labour	Conservative	44	16	-	-	Details
Merton	NOC	Conservative	46	4	-	4	Details
Newham	Labour	NOC	6	30	3	21	Details
Redbridge	Conservative	Conservative	55	5	-	-	Details
Richmond upon Thames	Conservative	Conservative	54	-	-	-	Details
Southwark	Labour	Labour	27	33	-	-	Details
Sutton	Conservative	Conservative	41	7	-	3	Details
Tower Hamlets	Labour	Labour	-	57	-	3	Details
Waltham Forest	Labour	Conservative	44	4	-	-	Details
Wandsworth	Labour	Conservative	48	12	-	-	Details
Westminster	Conservative	Conservative	55	5	-	-	Details

== Overall councillor numbers ==
Councillor statistics, 1968
Party	Seats	+/-	Councils	+/-
Conservative	1,438	+770	28	+19
Labour	350	-668	3	-17
Residents' association	36	-13		
Independent	26	+15		
Liberal	10	-6		
Communist	3	±0		
No overall control			1	-2
