= 1968 Sioux Falls mayoral special election =

- April 9, 1968; April 23, 1968

| Candidate | Mike Schirmer | G. Lowell Sutton | Kenneth G. Vanderloo |
| Party | Nonpartisan | Nonpartisan | Nonpartisan |
| First round | 7,627; 42.89% | 7,826; 44.01% | 2,328; 13.09% |
| Runoff | 8,409; 50.67% | 8,188; 49.33% | Eliminated |
Mayor before election
Earl McCart (acting)
Nonpartisan
Elected mayor
Mike Schirmer
Nonpartisan

The 1968 Sioux Falls mayoral special election took place on April 23, 1968, following a primary election on April 9, 1968. Mayor V. L. Crusinberry, first elected in the 1961 recall election and re-elected unopposed in 1964, died on December 12, 1967. The City Commission voted to hold a special election on April 9. City Auditor G. Lowell Sutton placed first in the primary election, winning 44 percent of the vote, and was joined in the general election by real estate agent and insurance broker Mike Schirmer, who won 43 percent. In the general election, Schirmer narrowly defeated Sutton, 51–49 percent.

== Primary election ==
=== Candidates ===
- G. Lowell Sutton, City Auditor
- Mike Schirmer, real estate agent and insurance broker
- Kenneth G. Vanderloo, service station operator

=== Results ===
1968 Sioux Falls mayoral special primary election
| Party | Candidate | Votes | % |
|---|---|---|---|
| Nonpartisan | G. Lowell Sutton | 7,826 | 44.01% |
| Nonpartisan | Mike Schirmer | 7,627 | 42.89% |
| Nonpartisan | Kenneth G. Vanderloo | 2,328 | 13.09% |
| Total votes | | 18,872 | 100.00% |

== General election ==
=== Results ===
1968 Sioux Falls mayoral special runoff election
| Party | Candidate | Votes | % |
|---|---|---|---|
| Nonpartisan | Mike Schirmer | 8,409 | 50.67% |
| Nonpartisan | G. Lowell Sutton | 8,188 | 49.33% |
| Total votes | | 16,597 | 100.00% |
