= 1968 Edinburgh Corporation election =

Local election in Scotland

- 7 May 1968

23 of the 69 seats to the Edinburgh Corporation 35 seats needed for a majority
| | First party | Second party | Third party |
|---|---|---|---|
| Party | Progressives | SNP | Labour |
| Last election | 34 | 2 | 5 |
| Seats won | 10 | 7 | 3 |
| Seats after | 34 | 8 | 3 |
| Seat change | Steady | ▲6 | ▼2 |
| Popular vote | 37,885 | 49,111 | 26,997 |
| Percentage | 26.9% | 34.8% | 19.1% |
| | Fourth party | Fifth party | Sixth party |
| Party | Conservative | Liberal | Independent |
| Last election | 2 | 1 | 1 |
| Seats won | 1 | 1 | 0 |
| Seats after | 3 | 1 | 1 |
| Seat change | ▲1 | Steady | Steady |
| Popular vote | 13,715 | 9,105 | N/A |
| Percentage | 9.7% | 6.5% | N/A |
- Results by ward.
Council control before election
No overall control
Council control after election
No overall control

An Election to the Edinburgh Corporation was held on 7 May 1968, alongside municipal elections across Scotland. Of the councils 69 seats, 22 were up for election. Despite receiving the most votes of any single party, the SNP won only 7 seats. Unlike in Glasgow, the Progressives and Conservatives did not run on a joint ticket. Despite that however the parties only ran competing candidates in the Gorgie-Dalry ward.

Following the election Edinburgh Corporation was composed of 34 Progressives (including the Lord Provost), 21 Labour councillors, 8 SNP councillors, 3 Conservatives, 1 Liberal, and 1 independent. Following the election the Progressive/Conservative coalition controlled the council with a majority of 6.

No election was held in the Holyrood ward, where the sitting Labour councillor died the week before the election.

Turnout was 140,987.

== Aggregate results ==
Edinburgh Corporation election, 1968
| Party | Seats | Gains | Losses | Net gain/loss | Seats % | Votes % | Votes | +/− |
|---|---|---|---|---|---|---|---|---|
| Progressives | 10 | 0 | 0 | Steady | 45.45 | 26.87 | 37,885 | |
| SNP | 7 | 6 | 0 | ▲6 | 31.82 | 34.83 | 49,111 | |
| Labour | 3 | 0 | 2 | ▼2 | 13.64 | 19.15 | 26,997 | |
| Conservative | 1 | 1 | 0 | ▲1 | 4.55 | 9.72 | 13,715 | |
| Liberal | 1 | 0 | 0 | Steady | 4.55 | 6.46 | 9,105 | |
| Communist | 0 | 0 | 0 | Steady | 0.00 | 1.74 | 2,462 | |
| Ind. Conservative | 0 | 0 | 0 | Steady | 0.00 | 1.21 | 1,712 | |

== Ward results ==
Location of Broughton ward

Broughton
| Party | Candidate | Votes | % |
|---|---|---|---|
| Progressives | A. Theurer | 2,239 | |
| SNP | C. MacDougall | 2,042 | |
| Liberal | E. W. Hall | 819 | |
| Labour | I. R. Hoy | 744 | |
| Majority | | 197 | |
| Turnout | | | 48.31 |
| Progressives hold | | | |

Location of Calton ward

Calton
| Party | Candidate | Votes | % |
|---|---|---|---|
| SNP | W. Thomson | 1,671 | |
| Progressives | A. D. Wilson | 1,637 | |
| Labour | S. Cook | 1,196 | |
| Majority | | 34 | |
| Turnout | | | 43.22 |
| SNP gain from Labour | | | |

Location of Central Leith ward

Central Leith
| Party | Candidate | Votes | % |
|---|---|---|---|
| SNP | F. T. Chalmers | 1,898 | |
| Labour | T. H. Greig | 1,393 | |
| Progressives | D. Valentine | 706 | |
| Communist | T. C. Taylor | 86 | |
| Majority | | 505 | |
| Turnout | | | 36.51 |
| SNP gain from Labour | | | |

Location of Colinton ward

Colinton
| Party | Candidate | Votes | % |
|---|---|---|---|
| Progressives | D. M. Cameron | 4,671 | |
| SNP | A. Westwood | 3,389 | |
| Labour | R. D. M. Brown | 1,450 | |
| Majority | | 1282 | |
| Turnout | | | 48.71 |
| Progressives hold | | | |

Location of Corstorphine ward

Corstorphine
| Party | Candidate | Votes | % |
|---|---|---|---|
| Progressives | F. Ford | 3,689 | |
| SNP | A. McCallum | 2,982 | |
| Liberal | Vera P. Heggie | 1,795 | |
| Majority | | 707 | |
| Turnout | | | 51.29 |
| Progressives hold | | | |

Location of Craigentinny ward

Craigentinny
| Party | Candidate | Votes | % |
|---|---|---|---|
| Labour | G. Drummond | 2,627 | |
| SNP | R. Anderson | 2,566 | |
| Conservative | Geraldine R. Johnston | 1,586 | |
| Majority | | 61 | |
| Turnout | | | 47.89 |
| Labour hold | | | |

Location of Craigmillar ward

Craigmillar
| Party | Candidate | Votes | % |
|---|---|---|---|
| SNP | R. Dalrymple | 2,590 | |
| Labour | D. F. Renton | 2,081 | |
| Conservative | D. R. Anderson | 823 | |
| Communist | M. D'Arcy | 145 | |
| Majority | | 509 | |
| Turnout | | | 40.0 |
| SNP gain from Labour | | | |

Location of George Square ward

George Square
| Party | Candidate | Votes | % |
|---|---|---|---|
| Progressives | W. Simpson-Bell | 1,601 | |
| SNP | T. C. Bogle | 1,331 | |
| Liberal | P.L. Newman | 630 | |
| Majority | | 270 | |
| Turnout | | | 36.59 |
| Progressives hold | | | |

Location of Gorgie-Dalry ward

Gorgie-Dalry
| Party | Candidate | Votes | % |
|---|---|---|---|
| SNP | T. McCarron | 2,088 | |
| Labour | J. E. Boyack | 1,591 | |
| Conservative | M. Pirie | 1,481 | |
| Progressives | Miss Mar A. M. Hislop | 511 | |
| Liberal | R. T. Parker | 140 | |
| Communist | M. R. Currie | 78 | |
| Majority | | 497 | |
| Turnout | | | 44.02 |
| SNP hold | | | |

Location of Liberton ward

Liberton
| Party | Candidate | Votes | % |
|---|---|---|---|
| Labour | P. Wilson | 4,290 | |
| SNP | A. G. Symington | 3,635 | |
| Conservative | J. F. Doyle | 3,259 | |
| Communist | J. Ashton | 195 | |
| Majority | | 655 | |
| Turnout | | | 51.83 |
| Labour hold | | | |

Location of Merchiston ward

Merchiston
| Party | Candidate | Votes | % |
|---|---|---|---|
| Liberal | R. L. Smith | 2,803 | |
| Conservative | B. A. Meek | 1,800 | |
| SNP | T. J. D. MacDonald | 1,368 | |
| Majority | | 1003 | |
| Turnout | | | 53.92 |
| Liberal hold | | | |

Location of Morningside ward

Morningside
| Party | Candidate | Votes | % |
|---|---|---|---|
| Progressives | R. Lorimer | 3,025 | |
| SNP | Catherina Moore | 1,748 | |
| Conservative | Sir Alexander Giles | 1,650 | |
| Majority | | 1,277 | |
| Turnout | | 6,423 | 50.16 |
| Progressives hold | | | |

Location of Murrayfield-Cramond ward

Murrayfield-Cramond
| Party | Candidate | Votes | % |
|---|---|---|---|
| Progressives | J. W. McKay | 5,400 | |
| SNP | R. A. Macdonald | 3,181 | |
| Labour | C. T. Harvie | 1,281 | |
| Majority | | 2,219 | |
| Turnout | | 9,862 | 50.55 |
| Progressives hold | | | |

Location of Newington ward

Newington
| Party | Candidate | Votes | % |
|---|---|---|---|
| Progressives | E. M. Kean | 3,761 | |
| SNP | G. W. Telford | 2,745 | |
| Labour | J. C. Campbell | 985 | |
| Liberal | J. Grahamslaw | 909 | |
| Majority | | 1016 | |
| Turnout | | | 53.37 |
| Progressives hold | | | |

Location of Pilton ward

Pilton
| Party | Candidate | Votes | % |
|---|---|---|---|
| Labour | Catherina T. Nealon | 2,913 | |
| SNP | W. Thompson | 2,724 | |
| Conservative | R. Beattie | 795 | |
| Communist | C. McManus | 147 | |
| Majority | | 189 | |
| Turnout | | | 34.33 |
| Labour hold | | | |

Location of Portobello ward

Portobello
| Party | Candidate | Votes | % |
|---|---|---|---|
| Progressives | A. W. Hunt | 2,873 | |
| SNP | R. G. Kelly | 2,687 | |
| Labour | D. H. Brown | 869 | |
| Liberal | G. H. T. Harvie | 593 | |
| Majority | | 186 | |
| Turnout | | | 51.74 |
| Progressives hold | | | |

Location of Sighthill ward

Sighthill
| Party | Candidate | Votes | % |
|---|---|---|---|
| SNP | G. D. M. Galbraith | 3,621 | |
| Labour | J. Ross | 2,583 | |
| Liberal | W. McLoed | 533 | |
| Communist | W. M. Millar | 134 | |
| Majority | | 1,038 | |
| Turnout | | | 45.35 |
| SNP gain from Labour | | | |

Location of South Leith

South Leith
| Party | Candidate | Votes | % |
|---|---|---|---|
| SNP | Mary G. Thompson | 2,320 | |
| Progressives | L. Scott | 1,922 | |
| Labour | W. S. Dalgleish | 1,708 | |
| Majority | | 398 | |
| Turnout | | | 47.01 |
| Progressives gain from Labour | | | |

Location of St Andrews ward

St. Andrews
| Party | Candidate | Votes | % |
|---|---|---|---|
| Conservative | D. Drummond-Young | 1,661 | |
| SNP | I. A. Macdonald | 1,056 | |
| Labour | I. L. Foggie | 401 | |
| Majority | | 605 | |
| Turnout | | | 39.19 |
| Conservative gain from Progressives | | | |

Location of St Bernards ward

St. Bernard's
| Party | Candidate | Votes | % |
|---|---|---|---|
| Progressives | Winifred E. Donaldson | 3,436 | |
| SNP | W. K. Archibald | 2,321 | |
| Liberal | Joyce Shein | 883 | |
| Ind. Conservative | Elva G. Speyer | 567 | |
| Majority | | 1,115 | |
| Turnout | | | 42.78 |
| Progressives hold | | | |

Location of St Giles ward

St. Giles
| Party | Candidate | Votes | % |
|---|---|---|---|
| SNP | J. McCann | 1,148 | |
| Labour | P. S. Wood | 885 | |
| Conservative | D. B. Harvey | 660 | |
| Majority | | 263 | |
| Turnout | | | 27.03 |
| SNP gain from Labour | | | |

Location of West Leith ward

West Leith
| Party | Candidate | Votes | % |
|---|---|---|---|
| Progressives | J. Scott | 2,925 | 71.87 |
| Ind. Conservative | A. H. Lester | 1,145 | 28.13 |
| Majority | | 1780 | 43.74 |
| Turnout | | 4070 | 36.90 |
| Progressives hold | | | |
