= 1961 Sioux Falls mayoral recall election =

- December 19, 1961

Candidate	V. L. Crusinberry	Fay Wheeldon
Party	Nonpartisan	Nonpartisan
Popular vote	12,875	5,103
Percentage	71.62%	28.38%
Mayor before election
Fay Wheeldon
Nonpartisan
Elected mayor
V. L. Crusinberry
Nonpartisan

The 1961 Sioux Falls mayoral recall election took place on December 19, 1961. Incumbent Mayor Fay Wheeldon faced a recall election over allegations that the city police department was badly run. Former Fire Department Chief V. L. Crusinberry challenged Wheeldon in the recall election and defeated him in a landslide, winning 72 percent of the vote.

== Candidates ==
- Fay Wheeldon, incumbent Mayor
- V. L. Crusinberry, former Chief of the City Fire Department, Deputy State Fire Marshal

== Campaign ==
On August 14, 1961, Captain Jack Stone, a member of the Sioux Falls Police Department, resigned from the force, alleging that there were "intolerable conditions" within the department. Police Chief Kenneth B. Chamberlain and Mayor Wheeldon denied the allegations, with Wheeldon observing that the current composition of the department is "the finest department in the history of Sioux Falls." Wheeldon said that he "would welcome a legal investigation of the Police Department." Thirty policemen signed a petition requesting an investigation of the Department. Lieutenant Herb Hawkey, one of the petitioners, alleged that he was denied a promotion to captain because he "nursemaided" Wheeldon during several drinking sprees. Wheeldon denied the allegations, which he condemned as a "particularly reckless and vicious attack." Chief Chamberlain fired several of the petitioners, who appealed their termination to the city Civil Service Board. State's Attorney William Clayton subsequently filed a removal action against Chamberlain.

A campaign began gathering petitions to force a recall of Wheeldon, citing the police department controversy. After the campaign submitted a sufficient number of petitions to the city, the City Commission scheduled the election for December 19, 1961. Former Fire Chief V. L. Crusinberry was the only candidate to file against Wheeldon. Wheeldon condemned the recall election and Crusinberry's candidacy, alleging that union-backed "professional city-wreckers" who "want loose law enforcement" were behind the recall election. The Argus Leader endorsed against the recall election, writing that Wheeldon "does not deserve the stigma of a recall" because he "has been a good mayor for Sioux Falls during a period of unprecedented prosperity." It criticized the recall campaign for a lack of transparency on "the reason for the big hurry in recalling the Mayor."

Ultimately, Wheeldon lost the election in a landslide, receiving only 28 percent of the vote to Crusinberry's 72 percent.

== Results ==
1961 Sioux Falls mayoral recall election
Party	Candidate	Votes	%
Nonpartisan	V. L. Crusinberry	12,875	71.62%
Nonpartisan	Fay Wheeldon (inc.)	5,103	28.38%
Total votes		17,978	100.00%
