= 1968 Glasgow Corporation election =

Scottish municipal election

Elections to Glasgow Corporation were held on 8 May 1968, alongside municipal elections across Scotland. Of the councils 111 seats, 37 were up for election. The election saw Labour losing its majority for the first time since 1952, with the council being gained by a Progressive-Conservative alliance, who emerged from the election with a total of 54 of the council's 111 seats. The Scottish National Party achieved a major breakthrough, winning a plurality of the popular vote and 13 seats.

Following the election, Glasgow Corporation was composed of 44 Labour councillors, 54 Conservatives and Progressives and 13 SNP.

== Election result ==
Glasgow Corporation election, 1968
Party	Seats	Gains	Losses	Net gain/loss	Seats %	Votes %	Votes	+/−
Progressive-Conservative alliance	54					34.7	93,153	
Labour	44					25.5	68,538	
SNP	13					36.0	96,505	
Other parties	0					3.8	10,075	

== Ward results ==
=== Anderston ===
Anderston
Party	Candidate	Votes	%	±%
Progressives	W. E. Dale*	1,463	38.3	
SNP	J. Jeffrey	1,169	30.6	
Labour	G. McGrath	1,134	29.7	
Communist	R. Anderson	56	1.4	
Majority		294	7.7	
Turnout		3,822	45.0	
Progressives hold		Swing		

=== Calton ===
Calton
Party	Candidate	Votes	%	±%
Labour	W. E. Dale*	1,237	44.8	
SNP	G. Barclay	807	28.4	
Progressives	J. R. Harper	687	24.2	
Communist	D. Currie	75	2.6	
Majority		466	16.4	
Turnout		2,842	28.2	
Labour hold		Swing		

=== Camphill ===
Camphill
Party	Candidate	Votes	%	±%
Progressives	J. Allan*	4,962	61.0	
SNP	L. Anderson	2,520	31.0	
Labour	T. McCalmont	428	5.2	
Communist	A. Dewar	224	2.8	
Majority		2,442	30.0	
Turnout		8,134	54.9	
Progressives hold		Swing		

=== Cathcart ===
Cathcart
Party	Candidate	Votes	%	±%
Progressives	G. Spence*	10,459	58.6	
SNP	B. Nandell	3,658	20.5	
Labour	T. Muir	3,138	17.6	
Communist	J. Towill	598	3.3	
Majority		6,801	38.1	
Turnout		17,853	45.6	
Progressives hold		Swing		

=== Cowcaddens ===
Cowcaddens
Party	Candidate	Votes	%	±%
SNP	A. McIntosh	1,323	41.1	
Labour	A. Coventry*	1,193	36.9	
Progressives	R. Wilson	657	20.3	
Communist	J. Reilly	56	1.7	
Majority		130	4.2	
Turnout		3,229	41.4	
SNP gain from Labour		Swing		

=== Cowlairs ===
Cowlairs
Party	Candidate	Votes	%	±%
SNP	A. Campbell	1,323	42.8	
Labour	E. Clark*	1,802	37.3	
Conservative	M. Nurse	825	17.1	
Communist	J. Turner	138	2.8	
Majority		265	5.5	
Turnout		4,832	33.3	
SNP gain from Labour		Swing		

=== Craigton ===
Craigton
Party	Candidate	Votes	%	±%
SNP	H. Henderson	6,668	43.9	
Progressives	G. Mason*	5,563	36.7	
Labour	R. McKay	2,699	17.8	
Communist	G. Neave	242	1.6	
Majority		1,105	7.2	
Turnout		15,172	56.8	
SNP gain from Progressives		Swing		

=== Dalmarnock ===
Dalmarnock
Party	Candidate	Votes	%	±%
SNP	I. Lindsey	1,998	41.4	
Labour	J. Robertson	1,866	38.7	
Progressives	D. Carlaw	657	18.0	
Communist	J. B. Dick	94	1.9	
Majority		132	2.7	
Turnout		4,827	29.8	
SNP gain from Labour		Swing		

=== Dennistoun ===
Dennistoun
Party	Candidate	Votes	%	±%
Progressives	J. B. McKenna*	3,580	48.1	
SNP	D. Horne	2,366	31.8	
Labour	J. Gunn	1,343	18.0	
Communist	A. Scott	157	2.1	
Majority		1,214	16.3	
Turnout		7,446	46.8	
Progressives hold		Swing		

=== Exchange ===
Exchange
Party	Candidate	Votes	%	±%
Progressives	J. J. Thompson*	1,476	56.0	
Independent Nationalist	R. J. Gillies	547	20.7	
SNP	J. E. Alton	484	18.3	
Communist	F. Hill	131	5.0	
Majority		929	35.2	
Turnout		2,638	33.3	
Progressives hold		Swing		

=== Fairfield ===
Fairfield
Party	Candidate	Votes	%	±%
Progressives	C. Brotherstone	2,405	41.1	
Labour	J. McAteer*	2,520	29.9	
SNP	W. Pettigrew	1,553	26.5	
Communist	J. Craig	142	2.5	
Majority		655	11.2	
Turnout		5,850	47.2	
Progressives gain from Labour		Swing		

=== Gorbals ===
Gorbals
Party	Candidate	Votes	%	±%
Labour	W. Lindsay*	1,396	55.1	
SNP	A. Ewing	923	36.4	
Conservative	H. A. Vesey	184	7.3	
Communist	T. Biggam	32	1.2	
Majority		473	18.7	
Turnout		2,535	31.7	
Labour hold		Swing		

=== Govan ===
Govan
Party	Candidate	Votes	%	±%
Labour	D. Doherty*	1,931	40.6	
SNP	W. Ford	1,560	32.8	
Conservative	E. H. Macdonald	1,075	22.6	
Communist	G. Cormack	192	4.0	
Majority		371	7.8	
Turnout		4,758	36.8	
Labour hold		Swing		

=== Govanhill ===
Govanhill
Party	Candidate	Votes	%	±%
Conservative	D. Wood*	2,722	37.8	
SNP	U. Miller	2,407	33.4	
Labour	G. M. Shaw	1,820	25.2	
Communist	C. Campbell	260	3.6	
Majority		315	4.4	
Turnout		7,209	43.3	
Conservative hold		Swing		

=== Hutchesontown ===
Hutchesontown
Party	Candidate	Votes	%	±%
Labour	J. J. McCrossan*	1,332	44.7	
Progressives	T. M. Moore	903	30.3	
SNP	M. McManus	673	22.6	
Communist	D. Burns	70	2.4	
Majority		429	14.4	
Turnout		2,978	36.2	
Labour hold		Swing		

=== Kelvinside ===
Kelvinside
Party	Candidate	Votes	%	±%
Conservative	L. M. Turpie	5,785	68.7	
SNP	A. Da Costa	1,710	20.3	
Liberal	L. Steedman	928	11.0	
Majority		4,075	48.4	
Turnout		8,423	54.1	
Conservative hold		Swing		

=== Kingston ===
Kingston
Party	Candidate	Votes	%	±%
Labour	M. Reilly*	1,025	35.8	
SNP	G. McClean	901	31.4	
Conservative	W. Johnston	889	31.0	
Communist	P. Devitt	52	1.8	
Majority		124	4.4	
Turnout		2,867	38.8	
Labour hold		Swing		

=== Kinning Park ===
Kinning Park
Party	Candidate	Votes	%	±%
Progressives	M. G. Cowie*	2,279	45.1	
SNP	J. Michie	1,616	31.9	
Labour	A. McGill	940	18.6	
Communist	J. McClymont	232	4.6	
Majority		663	13.2	
Turnout		5,058	41.8	
Progressives hold		Swing		

=== Knightswood ===
Knightswood
Party	Candidate	Votes	%	±%
SNP	G. Wotherspoon	5,153	40.3	
Labour	D. McColl*	4,171	32.6	
Conservative	E. Davidson	2,870	22.4	
Communist	H. D. Boyd	591	4.7	
Majority		982	7.7	
Turnout		12,785	43.2	
SNP gain from Labour		Swing		

=== Langside ===
Langside
Party	Candidate	Votes	%	±%
Progressives	R. Wallace*	5,965	63.5	
SNP	I. Barclay	2,124	22.6	
Labour	A. McFarlane	974	10.4	
Communist	J. Downes	336	3.5	
Majority		3,841	40.9	
Turnout		9,399	49.9	
Progressives hold		Swing		

=== Maryhill ===
Maryhill
Party	Candidate	Votes	%	±%
SNP	R. A. Stevenson	3,030	39.3	
Labour	J. M. Craigen*	2,754	35.8	
Conservative	T. K. Smith	1,770	23.0	
Communist	D. Whyte	147	1.9	
Majority		276	3.5	
Turnout		7,701	45.8	
SNP gain from Labour		Swing		

=== Mile-End ===
Mile-End
Party	Candidate	Votes	%	±%
SNP	W. F. McLaughlin	1,696	41.7	
Labour	T. Henderson	1,297	31.9	
Conservative	J. H. Lorimer	903	22.1	
Communist	C. Glen	173	4.3	
Majority		399	9.8	
Turnout		4,069	28.7	
SNP gain from Labour		Swing		

=== North Kelvin ===
North Kelvin
Party	Candidate	Votes	%	±%
Progressives	W. M. Hutcheson*	2,594	48.6	
SNP	C. McLachlan	2,126	39.9	
Labour	M. Boyle	481	9.0	
Communist	M. McMillan	133	2.5	
Majority		468	8.7	
Turnout		5,334	39.2	
Progressives hold		Swing		

=== Park ===
Park
Party	Candidate	Votes	%	±%
Progressives	W. N. Samuels*	2,169	56.8	
SNP	H. F. Smith	1,648	43.2	
Majority		521	13.6	
Turnout		3,817	38.0	
Progressives hold		Swing		

=== Parkhead ===
Parkhead
Party	Candidate	Votes	%	±%
Progressives	A. McCue*	2,182	43.5	
SNP	T. Brady	1,670	33.3	
Labour	D. B. McCulloch	1,083	21.6	
Communist	J. McFadden	85	1.6	
Majority		512	10.2	
Turnout		5,020	44.1	
Progressives hold		Swing		

=== Partick East ===
Partick East
Party	Candidate	Votes	%	±%
Progressives	A. S. Warren*	3,152	50.5	
SNP	L. Herring	2,374	38.1	
Labour	J. G. Buchan	565	9.1	
Communist	W. Armstrong	145	2.3	
Majority		778	12.4	
Turnout		6,236	48.4	
Progressives hold		Swing		

=== Partick West ===
Partick West
Party	Candidate	Votes	%	±%
Progressives	J. H. Fraser*	2,978	48.7	
SNP	M. MacRurry	2,469	40.4	
Labour	W. Meikle	415	6.8	
Communist	S. Barr	251	4.1	
Majority		509	8.3	
Turnout		6,113	46.1	
Progressives hold		Swing		

=== Pollokshaws ===
Pollokshaws
Party	Candidate	Votes	%	±%
SNP	G. A. Leslie	6,210	45.6	
Labour	W. H. Cockburn*	4,248	31.2	
Conservative	D. S. Wright	2,892	21.2	
Communist	E. Coffey	260	2.0	
Majority		1,962	14.4	
Turnout		13,610	47.8	
SNP gain from Labour		Swing		

=== Pollokshields ===
Pollokshields
Party	Candidate	Votes	%	±%
Progressives	W. C. Munro	5,073	43.5	
SNP	E. J. Barwick	3,505	30.0	
Labour	P. O'Rourke	2,682	23.0	
Communist	W. Aitken	414	3.5	
Majority		1,568	13.5	
Turnout		11,674	49.6	
Progressives hold		Swing		

=== Provan ===
Provan
Party	Candidate	Votes	%	±%
SNP	J. Airth	8,461	47.1	
Labour	R. McCutcheon*	6,641	37.0	
Progressives	C. Pirie	2,031	11.3	
Communist	J. Jackson	827	4.6	
Majority		1,820	10.1	
Turnout		17,960	40.4	
SNP gain from Labour		Swing		

=== Ruchill ===
Ruchill
Party	Candidate	Votes	%	±%
SNP	J. Dewar	4,308	44.8	
Labour	T. E. Hollywood	3,832	39.8	
Progressives	J. Davidson	1,097	11.4	
Communist	J. Furey	381	4.0	
Majority		476	5.0	
Turnout		9,618	37.6	
SNP gain from Labour		Swing		

=== Shettleston & Tollcross ===
Shettleston & Tollcross
Party	Candidate	Votes	%	±%
SNP	W. Lindsay	6,210	43.6	
Labour	T. B. Duncan*	4,155	39.0	
Conservative	J. D. Train	1,631	15.3	
Communist	T. McAdam	223	2.1	
Majority		499	4.6	
Turnout		10,663	40.3	
SNP gain from Labour		Swing		

=== Springburn ===
Springburn
Party	Candidate	Votes	%	±%
SNP	W. Morton	3,977	47.5	
Labour	W. H. Russell*	3,264	38.9	
Progressives	J. Ogilvie	1,097	9.6	
Communist	N. MacLellan	335	4.0	
Majority		713	8.5	
Turnout		8,381	41.9	
SNP gain from Labour		Swing		
