= 1968 Salford City Council election =

Local election in Salford

- 9 May 1968

16 of 64 seats on Salford City Council 33 seats needed for a majority
	First party	Second party	Third party
Party	Conservative	Labour	Liberal
Last election	13 seats, 56.3%	3 seats, 34.5%	1 seat, 8.3%
Seats before	29	30	5
Seats won	15	0	1
Seats after	40	20	4
Seat change	▲11	▼10	▼1
Popular vote	18,289	10,689	2,945
Percentage	57.2%	33.5%	9.2%
Swing	▲0.9%	▼1.0%	▲0.9%
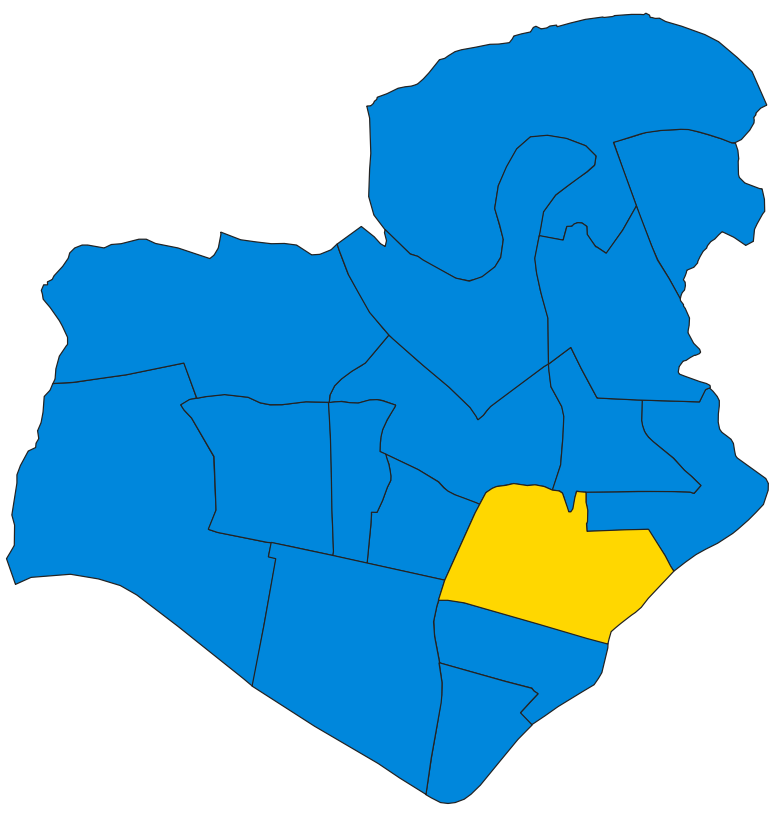
- Map of results of 1968 election
Leader of the Council before election
No overall control
Leader of the Council after election
Conservative

Elections to Salford City Council were held on Thursday, 9 May 1968. One-third of the councillors seats were up for election, with each successful candidate to serve a three-year term of office. The Conservative Party gained overall control of the council from no overall control.

== Election result ==
Party	Votes		Seats			Full Council	
Conservative Party	18,289 (57.2%)	▲0.9	15 (93.8%)	15 / 16	▲11	40 (62.5%)	40 / 64
Labour Party	10,689 (33.5%)	▼1.0	0 (0.0%)	0 / 16	▼10	20 (31.3%)	20 / 64
Liberal Party	2,945 (9.2%)	▲0.9	1 (6.3%)	1 / 16	▼1	4 (6.3%)	4 / 64
Communist	23 (0.1%)	▼0.7	0 (0.0%)	0 / 16	Steady	0 (0.0%)	0 / 64

=== Full council ===
↓
20	4	40

=== Aldermen ===
↓
8	1	7

=== Councillors ===
↓
12	3	33

== Ward results ==
=== Albert Park ===
Albert Park
Party	Candidate	Votes	%	±%
Conservative	A. Bowie	1,546	56.5	−2.8
Labour	J. Bryans*	1,189	43.5	+2.8
Majority		357	13.0	−5.6
Turnout		2,735		
Conservative gain from Labour		Swing		

=== Charlestown ===
Charlestown
Party	Candidate	Votes	%	±%
Conservative	A. Wood	1,105	59.0	+4.3
Labour	G. Hough*	768	41.0	−4.3
Majority		337	18.0	+8.6
Turnout		1,873		
Conservative gain from Labour		Swing		

=== Claremont ===
Claremont
Party	Candidate	Votes	%	±%
Conservative	R. Stones*	2,687	73.3	−7.9
Labour	W. Jackson	607	16.6	−2.2
Liberal	F. Smith	371	10.1	N/A
Majority		2,080	56.7	−5.7
Turnout		3,665		
Conservative hold		Swing		

=== Crescent ===
Crescent
Party	Candidate	Votes	%	±%
Liberal	W. W. Buckley	359	39.5	−11.6
Conservative	E. Duffy	302	33.2	+7.9
Labour	E. Mallinson	249	27.4	+3.8
Majority		57	6.3	−19.5
Turnout		910		
Liberal hold		Swing		

=== Docks ===
Docks
Party	Candidate	Votes	%	±%
Conservative	A. Plant	1,095	64.0	+1.5
Labour	L. Hough*	615	36.0	+1.4
Majority		480	28.0	+0.1
Turnout		1,710		
Conservative gain from Labour		Swing		

=== Kersal ===
Kersal
Party	Candidate	Votes	%	±%
Conservative	J. Edwards	1,565	41.9	−14.2
Liberal	M. Corwin*	1,464	39.2	+12.9
Labour	J. Davis	707	18.9	+1.3
Majority		101	2.7	−27.1
Turnout		3,736		
Conservative gain from Liberal		Swing		

=== Langworthy ===
Langworthy
Party	Candidate	Votes	%	±%
Conservative	E. Doran	1,001	63.2	+15.6
Labour	B. Wallsworth*	583	36.8	+0.6
Majority		418	26.4	+15.0
Turnout		1,584		
Conservative gain from Labour		Swing		

=== Mandley Park ===
Mandley Park
Party	Candidate	Votes	%	±%
Conservative	J. E. Bedell	1,597	54.8	+7.1
Labour	T. J. A. Harding*	1,316	45.2	+6.5
Majority		281	9.6	+1.8
Turnout		2,913		
Conservative gain from Labour		Swing		

=== Ordsall Park ===
Ordsall Park
Party	Candidate	Votes	%	±%
Conservative	P. Pessagno	634	42.4	−0.8
Labour	P. Grimshaw	633	42.3	−9.0
Liberal	H. Welsby	230	15.3	N/A
Majority		1	0.1	
Turnout		1,497		
Conservative gain from Labour		Swing		

=== Regent ===
Regent
Party	Candidate	Votes	%	±%
Conservative	L. B. Scott	761	46.1	+10.2
Labour	M. Jackson	708	42.9	+0.4
Liberal	S. Bibby	180	11.0	−3.2
Majority		53	3.2	
Turnout		1,649		
Conservative gain from Labour		Swing		

=== St. Matthias' ===
St. Matthias'
Party	Candidate	Votes	%	±%
Conservative	G. Bamber	817	54.3	+9.8
Labour	M. Williams*	687	45.7	−9.8
Majority		130	8.6	
Turnout		1,504		
Conservative gain from Labour		Swing		

=== St. Paul's ===
St. Paul's
Party	Candidate	Votes	%	±%
Conservative	H. Handley	643	45.7	+3.1
Labour	G. D. Franks*	543	38.6	−2.1
Liberal	P. Smith	221	15.7	−1.0
Majority		100	7.1	+5.2
Turnout		1,407		
Conservative gain from Labour		Swing		

=== St. Thomas' ===
St. Thomas'
Party	Candidate	Votes	%	±%
Conservative	S. Cooper*	637	66.4	−0.1
Labour	J. Holt	300	31.3	−0.3
Communist	W. Fallon	23	2.3	+0.4
Majority		337	35.1	+0.2
Turnout		960		
Conservative hold		Swing		

=== Seedley ===
Seedley
Party	Candidate	Votes	%	±%
Conservative	B. Nolan*	1,614	69.4	+0.1
Labour	J. Briggs	713	30.6	−0.1
Majority		901	38.8	+0.2
Turnout		2,327		
Conservative hold		Swing		

=== Trinity ===
Trinity
Party	Candidate	Votes	%	±%
Conservative	L. Daly	547	47.7	−11.1
Labour	J. R. Jaffe*	479	41.8	+0.6
Liberal	J. E. Littman	120	10.5	N/A
Majority		68	5.9	−11.7
Turnout		1,146		
Conservative gain from Labour		Swing		

=== Weaste ===
Weaste
Party	Candidate	Votes	%	±%
Conservative	W. Johnson*	1,738	74.6	+5.8
Labour	G. Leech	592	25.4	−5.8
Majority		1,146	49.2	+11.6
Turnout		2,330		
Conservative hold		Swing		
