= 1968 Turkish local elections =

- 2 June 1968

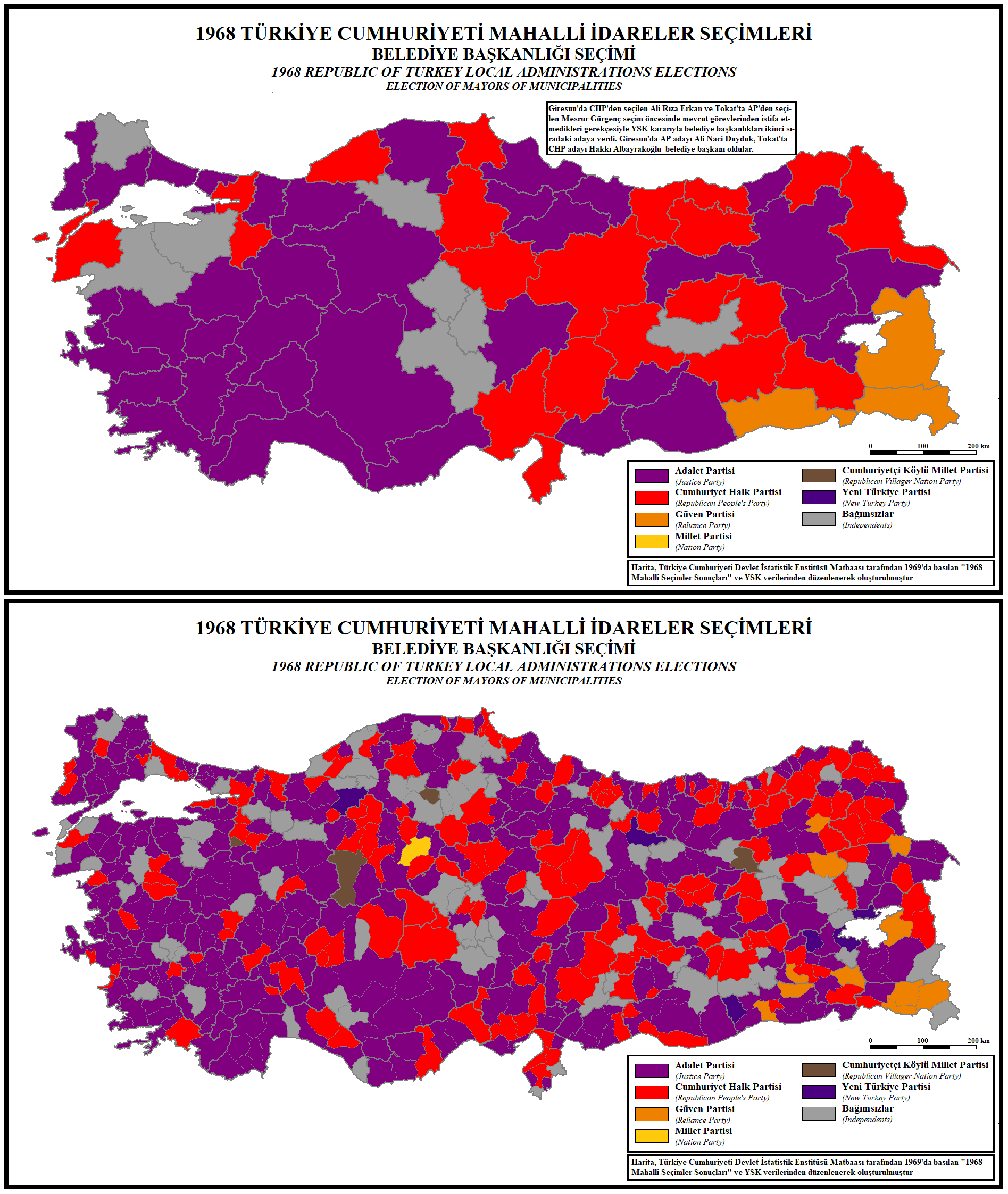

Local elections were held in Turkey on 2 June 1968. In the elections, both the mayors and the local parliaments (Turkish: İl Genel Meclisi) were elected. The figures presented below are the results of the local parliament elections.

== Results ==
=== Provincial assemblies ===
Party	Votes	%
Justice Party	4,470,687	49.06
Republican People's Party	2,542,644	27.90
Reliance Party	603,268	6.62
Nation Party	318,804	3.50
Workers' Party of Turkey	248,134	2.72
Unity Party	149,832	1.64
Republican Villagers Nation Party	90,816	1.00
New Turkey Party	65,593	0.72
Independents	622,708	6.83
Total	9,112,486	100.00

=== Mayors ===
Province	Party
Adana	CHP
Adapazarı	AP
Adıyaman	AP
Afyonkarahisar	AP
Ağrı	AP
Amasya	AP
Ankara	AP
Antalya	AP
Artvin	CHP
Aydın	AP
Balıkesir	IND.
Bilecik	CHP
Bingöl	CHP
Bitlis	AP
Bolu	AP
Burdur	AP
Bursa	AP

Province	Party
Çanakkale	CHP
Çankırı	IND.
Çorum	CHP
Denizli	AP
Diyarbakır	CHP
Edirne	AP
Elazığ	IND.
Erzincan	AP
Erzurum	AP
Eskişehir	AP
Gaziantep	AP
Giresun	CHP
Gümüşhane	CHP
Hakkâri	CGP
Hatay	CHP
Isparta	AP
Istanbul	AP

Province	Party
İzmir	AP
İzmit	CHP
Kars	CHP
Kastamonu	AP
Kayseri	AP
Kırklareli	IND.
Kırşehir	IND.
Konya	AP
Kütahya	AP
Malatya	CHP
Manisa	AP
Mersin	AP
Kahramanmaraş	CHP
Mardin	CGP
Muğla	AP
Muş	AP
Nevşehir	AP

Province	Party
Niğde	IND.
Ordu	CHP
Rize	AP
Samsun	AP
Siirt	CHP
Sinop	CHP
Sivas	CHP
Tekirdağ	AP
Tokat	AP
Trabzon	CHP
Tunceli	CHP
Şanlıurfa	AP
Uşak	AP
Van	AP
Yozgat	CHP
Zonguldak	CHP
