= 1968 Bexley London Borough Council election =

1968 Bexley Council election
- 9 May 1968

All 56 council seats
	First party	Second party
Leader	Frederick Brearley	Peter Maxwell
Party	Conservative	Labour
Last election	17	39
Seats won	55	0
Seat change	▲38	▼39
Popular vote	TBD	TBD
Percentage	TBD	TBD
- Map of the results. Conservatives in blue, Independents in grey.
Subsequent council control
Conservative majority

The 1968 Bexley Council election took place on 9 May 1968 to elect members of Bexley London Borough Council in London, England. The whole council was up for election. The Conservative Party won all but one seat and took control of the council from Labour.

== Background ==
The London Borough of Bexley had been created by the London Government Act 1963 as a merger of the Municipal Borough of Bexley, Municipal Borough of Erith, Chislehurst and Sidcup Urban District and Crayford Urban District.

The first elections to Bexley Council in 1964, initially as a "shadow authority" were won by the Labour party, and James Wellbeloved became council leader. Wellbeloved contested the 1965 Erith and Crayford by-election and won, giving the council leadership to Peter Maxwell.

143 candidates stood in the election for the 56 seats being contested across 20 wards. This was down 14 candidates from the 1964 election, primarily due to the Liberal party halving their candidate count from 47 to 22. The Labour party stood candidates for every seat for the second time. The Conservative party stood candidates for every seat for the first time, having not stood at all in two Crayford wards in 1964. There were two Communist Party candidates and seven independents. There were 13 three-seat wards, 4 two-seat wards, 2 four-seat wards and 1 single-seat ward.

== Election result ==
1968 Bexley London Borough Council election
Party	Candidates						Votes		
Party	Stood	Elected	Gained	Unseated	Net	% of total	%	No.	Net %
Conservative	56	55	38	0	▲38	98.2	TBD	TBD	TBD
Labour	56	0	0	39	▼39	0.0	TBD	TBD	TBD
Liberal	22	0	0	0	Steady	0	TBD	TBD	TBD
Independent	7	1	1	0	▲1	1.8	TBD	TBD	TBD
Communist	2	0	0	0	Steady	0	TBD	TBD	TBD
Total	143	56				100.0		TBD	

The results saw the Conservatives gain control of the council after winning 55 of the 56 seats. This was the best result for the Conservatives ever. There was a turnout of 48% on an electorate of 149,517.

== Ward results ==
Belvedere (3)
Party	Candidate	Votes	%	±%
Conservative	L. Mason	2,120	53.6	
Conservative	P. Read	2,003		
Conservative	D. Warner	1,983		
Labour	Ms. B. Scott	1184	29.9	
Labour	Ms. M. Barron	1178		
Labour	Ms. S. Gadsdon	1150		
Independent	E. Taylor	654	16.5	
Independent	Ms. A. Taylor	629		
Independent	C. Hills	578		
Turnout		TBD	44.4	
Conservative gain from Labour		Swing		
Conservative gain from Labour		Swing		
Conservative gain from Labour		Swing		

Bostall (3)
Party	Candidate	Votes	%	±%
Conservative	Ms. D. Maclean	2,640	70.7	
Conservative	B. Sams	2,600	-	
Conservative	C. Woodard	2,591	-	
Labour	P. Daynes	1096	29.3	
Labour	Ms. R. Irvine	1066		
Labour	M. Barrett	1037		
Turnout		TBD	51.7	
Conservative gain from Labour		Swing		
Conservative gain from Labour		Swing		
Conservative gain from Labour		Swing		

Brampton (3)
Party	Candidate	Votes	%	±%
Conservative	J. Cade	2,778	67.6	
Conservative	T. Winch	2,755	-	
Conservative	B. Youngman	2,738	-	
Labour	A. Cross	1128	27.5	
Labour	Ms. D. Taylor	1093		
Labour	R. Shea	1070		
Communist	W. Turner	202	4.9	
Turnout		TBD	50	
Conservative gain from Labour		Swing		
Conservative gain from Labour		Swing		
Conservative gain from Labour		Swing		

Christchurch (3)
Party	Candidate	Votes	%	±%
Conservative	N. Antenbring	2,836	78.8	
Conservative	Ms. B. Antenbring	2,798	-	
Conservative	C. Jamieson-Harvey	2,766	-	
Labour	Ms. A. Hooper	761	21.2	
Labour	W. Whiffen	722		
Labour	A. Martin	712		
Turnout		TBD	45.7	
Conservative hold		Swing		
Conservative hold		Swing		
Conservative hold		Swing		

Crayford North (3)
Party	Candidate	Votes	%	±%
Conservative	G. Gerloff	2,044	53.6	
Conservative	J. Bowes	2,030	-	
Conservative	P. Reader	2,014	-	
Labour	H. Clark	1772	46.4	
Labour	P. Maxwell	1737		
Labour	K. Smith	1695		
Turnout		TBD	41.8	
Conservative gain from Labour		Swing		
Conservative gain from Labour		Swing		
Conservative gain from Labour		Swing		

Crayford Town (3)
Party	Candidate	Votes	%	±%
Conservative	C. Pollock	1,411	48.2	
Conservative	S. Woolterton	1,396	-	
Conservative	B. Freeman	1,364	-	
Labour	A. Turner	1360	46.4	
Labour	Ms. M. Bradley	1337		
Labour	L. Francis	1309		
Independent	P. Blunt	157	5.4	
Turnout		TBD	41.7	
Conservative gain from Labour		Swing		
Conservative gain from Labour		Swing		
Conservative gain from Labour		Swing		

Crayford West (2)
Party	Candidate	Votes	%	±%
Conservative	J. Prangnell	1,964	74.1	
Conservative	R. Barman	1,959	-	
Labour	Ms. F. Pilbrow	686	25.9	
Labour	C. Tyler	661		
Turnout		TBD	48.8	
Conservative gain from Labour		Swing		
Conservative gain from Labour		Swing		

Danson (3)
Party	Candidate	Votes	%	±%
Independent	A. Melbourne	2,359	42.2	
Conservative	B. Jefferies	2,165	38.7	
Conservative	G. Lee	2,135	-	
Conservative	Ms. A. Orange	2017		
Labour	D. Anderson	1072	19.2	
Labour	S. Cooper	977		
Labour	M. Kilner	791		
Turnout		TBD	58.5	
Independent gain from Labour		Swing		
Conservative gain from Labour		Swing		
Conservative gain from Labour		Swing		

East Wickham (3)
Party	Candidate	Votes	%	±%
Conservative	Ms. G. Crawford	2,435	69.8	
Conservative	J. Holden	2,421	-	
Conservative	Ms. R. Holden	2,353	-	
Labour	R. Burke	1053	30.2	
Labour	R. Allen	1019		
Labour	B. Francis	1008		
Turnout		TBD	45.1	
Conservative gain from Labour		Swing		
Conservative gain from Labour		Swing		
Conservative gain from Labour		Swing		

Erith Town (3)
Party	Candidate	Votes	%	±%
Conservative	O. Hawke	1,793	56.6	
Conservative	Ms. N. Hooper	1,784	-	
Conservative	D. Price	1,741	-	
Labour	J. Powrie	1375	43.4	
Labour	T. Lebar	1294		
Labour	D. Enticknap	1238		
Turnout		TBD	40.1	
Conservative gain from Labour		Swing		
Conservative gain from Labour		Swing		
Conservative gain from Labour		Swing		

Falconwood (2)
Party	Candidate	Votes	%	±%
Conservative	A. Pease	1,539	69.7	
Conservative	R. Thorpe	1,513	-	
Labour	R. Staples	670	30.3	
Labour	E. Stoneman	668		
Turnout		TBD	53.7	
Conservative gain from Labour		Swing		
Conservative gain from Labour		Swing		

Lamorbey East (3)
Party	Candidate	Votes	%	±%
Conservative	B. Forrest	2,408	68.1	
Conservative	N. Austin	2,358	-	
Conservative	G. Pickford	2,345	-	
Labour	C. Hargrave	723	20.5	
Labour	B. Nichols	706		
Labour	H. Smith	698		
Liberal	Ms. S. Burraston	404	11.4	
Liberal	M. Kempton	344		
Liberal	W. King	334		
Turnout		TBD	49.1	
Conservative hold		Swing		
Conservative hold		Swing		
Conservative hold		Swing		

Lamorbey West (4)
Party	Candidate	Votes	%	±%
Conservative	F. Ambrose	3,276	62.6	
Conservative	K. McAndrew	3,191	-	
Conservative	S. James	3,157	-	
Conservative	R. Yeudall	3,154	-	
Labour	M. Attewell	1553	29.7	
Labour	J. Cronin	1520		
Labour	Ms. F. Schuch	1518		
Labour	Ms. E. Sheppard	1499		
Liberal	H. Elmitt	401	7.7	
Liberal	E. Thomas	361		
Liberal	Ms. R. Scholey	332		
Liberal	Ms. A. Tucker	325		
Turnout		TBD	52.7	
Conservative gain from Labour		Swing		
Conservative gain from Labour		Swing		
Conservative gain from Labour		Swing		
Conservative gain from Labour		Swing		

North Cray (1)
Party	Candidate	Votes	%	±%
Conservative	G. Martin	710	49.6	
Labour	Ms. E. Rhodes	397	27.7	
Liberal	A. Morris	288	20.1	
Communist	M. Young	37	2.6	
Turnout		TBD	52.8	
Conservative gain from Labour		Swing		

Northumberland Heath (3)
Party	Candidate	Votes	%	±%
Conservative	J. Bitmead	2,124	60.7	
Conservative	W. Newman	2,110	-	
Conservative	K. Boswell	2,107	-	
Labour	Ms. M. Eccles	1375	39.3	
Labour	Ms. J. Sidders	1327		
Labour	E. Handy	1306		
Turnout		TBD	45.4	
Conservative gain from Labour		Swing		
Conservative gain from Labour		Swing		
Conservative gain from Labour		Swing		

Sidcup East (3)
Party	Candidate	Votes	%	±%
Conservative	D. Evans	2,909	71	
Conservative	Ms. E. Swift	2,859	-	
Conservative	P. Talbot	2,824	-	
Labour	H. Gibson	804	19.6	
Labour	J. Mullis	792		
Labour	D. Breacker	745		
Liberal	F. Snow	384	9.4	
Liberal	W. Sarton	330		
Liberal	R. Moat	319		
Turnout		TBD	44.7	
Conservative hold		Swing		
Conservative hold		Swing		
Conservative hold		Swing		

Sidcup West (2)
Party	Candidate	Votes	%	±%
Conservative	R. Pope	2,527	72.2	
Conservative	J. Owles	2,508	-	
Labour	A. Corfield	619	17.7	
Labour	R. Brierly	586		
Liberal	L. Rogers	354	10.1	
Liberal	Ms. B. Rogers	349		
Turnout		TBD	51.7	
Conservative hold		Swing		
Conservative hold		Swing		

St. Marys (4)
Party	Candidate	Votes	%	±%
Conservative	F. Brearley	4,025	71.4	
Conservative	H. Friend	3,985	-	
Conservative	W. Flint	3,961	-	
Conservative	J. Minett	3,950	-	
Labour	J. Clark	793	14.1	
Labour	Ms. V. Davis	762		
Labour	M. Horton	755		
Labour	B. Withers	750		
Liberal	T. Batley	530	9.4	
Liberal	S. Bathe	476		
Liberal	Ms. A. Newman	453		
Liberal	T. Gillman	452		
Independent	R. Day	286	5.1	
Turnout		TBD	51	
Conservative hold		Swing		
Conservative hold		Swing		
Conservative hold		Swing		
Conservative hold		Swing		

St. Michaels (3)
Party	Candidate	Votes	%	±%
Conservative	F. Pearce	2,158	56.5	
Conservative	R. Sisk	2,142	-	
Conservative	F. Hallett	2,072	-	
Labour	A. Stuttle	1268	33.2	
Labour	J. McLean	1243		
Labour	J. Wellard	1219		
Liberal	Ms. M. Ingram	393	10.3	
Liberal	F. Ward	382		
Liberal	C. Wright	357		
Turnout		TBD	47.4	
Conservative gain from Labour		Swing		
Conservative gain from Labour		Swing		
Conservative gain from Labour		Swing		

Upton (2)
Party	Candidate	Votes	%	±%
Conservative	J. Collie	2,026	66.4	
Conservative	S. Cover	1,989	-	
Labour	Ms. P. Cooper	690	22.6	
Labour	L. Biddle	614		
Liberal	G. Plummer	186	6.1	
Liberal	R. Lenk	177		
Independent	E. Gillman	151	4.9	
Turnout		TBD	50.3	
Conservative hold		Swing		
Conservative hold		Swing		
