= 1968 Brent London Borough Council election =

The 1968 Brent Council election took place on 9 May 1968 to elect members of Brent London Borough Council in London, England. The whole council was up for election and the Conservative Party gained overall control of the council.

== Background ==
Since the last election in 1964 the boundaries and number of wards were adjusted, increasing the total number of wards from 26 to 31.

Six new wards were created - Fryent, Roe Green, Sudbury Court, Town Hall, Wembley Central and Wembley Park; six (Alperton, Barham, Kenton, Kingsbury, Sudbury & Tokyngton) saw their representation reduced from 3 to 2 councillors and one ward (Preston) had its representation reduced from 3 councillors to 1 councillor. Eight other wards had minor boundary changes - Gladstone, Harlesden, Kensal Rise, Kilburn, Manor, Mapesbury, Queensbury & Queens Park.
