= 1968 Sutton London Borough Council election =

The 1968 Sutton Council election took place on 9 May 1968 to elect members of Sutton London Borough Council in London, England. The whole council was up for election and the Conservative Party stayed in overall control of the council.

== Background ==
A total of 127 candidates, down from 157 in 1964 stood in the election for the 51 seats being contested across 25 wards. These included a full slate from the Conservative Party, while Labour stood 48 candidates, the Liberals stood 16 candidates, the Residents Association stood 10 candidates, and the Communist Party stood 2 candidates. There were 24 two-seat wards and 1 three-seat ward.

== Election result ==
Sutton local election result 1968
Party	Seats	Gains	Losses	Net gain/loss	Seats %	Votes %	Votes	+/−
Conservative	41	▲11	Steady	▲11	80.4	63.0	57,962	
Labour	7	Steady	▼10	▼10	13.7	21.2	19,510	
Residents	3	▲1	Steady	▲1	5.9	9.2	8,454	
Liberal	0	Steady	Steady	Steady	0.0	6.5	5,988	
Communist	0	Steady	Steady	Steady	0.0	0.1	99	

== Ward results ==
Beddington North (2)
Party	Candidate	Votes	%	±%
Labour	G.E.W. Eve	742	17.8	
Conservative	R. Granthier	733	17.6	
Conservative	C.B. Hill	721	17.3	
Labour	H. Fox	697	16.7	
Residents	Mrs M.M. Heath	647	15.5	
Residents	B.J. Carr	633	15.2	
Turnout		4,173		
Labour hold		Swing		
Conservative gain from Labour		Swing		

(Residents and Ratepayers)

Beddington South (2)
Party	Candidate	Votes	%	±%
Conservative	W.R. Hadden	1,499	27.5	
Conservative	F.G. Caunt	1,450	26.6	
Residents	P.L. Miller	951	17.4	
Residents	R.C. Pitt	918	16.8	
Labour	E.I. Marshall	334	6.1	
Labour	M.D. Simmons	303	5.6	
Turnout		5,455		
Conservative hold		Swing		
Conservative hold		Swing		

(Residents and Ratepayers)

Belmont (2)
Party	Candidate	Votes	%	±%
Conservative	J.C. Cox	1,750	46.3	
Conservative	F.G. Moore	1,728	45.7	
Labour	Dr V. Marks	164	4.3	
Labour	Mrs P.M. Brennan	140	3.7	
Turnout		3,782		
Conservative hold		Swing		
Conservative hold		Swing		

Carshalton Central (2)
Party	Candidate	Votes	%	±%
Conservative	C.W.M. McDowell	1,038	43.7	
Conservative	D.H.T. Salari	1,005	42.3	
Labour	Mrs J.S.C. Crowley	170	7.2	
Labour	Mrs J. Markan	164	6.9	
Turnout		2,377		
Conservative hold		Swing		
Conservative hold		Swing		

Carshalton North East (3)
Party	Candidate	Votes	%	±%
Conservative	F. Hartshorn	1,311	21.4	
Conservative	J.W. Dunn	1,329	21.3	
Conservative	G.W. Ballard	1,309	21.0	
Labour	Mrs S.J. Buck	766	12.3	
Labour	H.L. Markan	757	12.1	
Labour	G.W. Ballard	739	11.9	
Turnout		6,231		
Conservative gain from Labour		Swing		
Conservative gain from Labour		Swing		
Conservative gain from Labour		Swing		

Carshalton North West (2)
Party	Candidate	Votes	%	±%
Conservative	G.D. Coombs	1,343	41.8	
Conservative	R. Slater	1,300	40.5	
Labour	E.F. Long	298	9.3	
Labour	Miss J.H. Moyser	272	8.5	
Turnout		3,213		
Conservative hold		Swing		
Conservative hold		Swing		

Carshalton St Helier North (2)
Party	Candidate	Votes	%	±%
Labour	C.J. Goodall	1,097	38.7	
Labour	H. Ferguson	1,080	38.1	
Conservative	B. Perowne	330	11.6	
Conservative	P. Robinson	326	11.5	
Turnout		2,833		
Labour hold		Swing		
Labour hold		Swing		

Carshalton St Helier South (2)
Party	Candidate	Votes	%	±%
Labour	P.J. Bassett	1,081	40.0	
Labour	Mrs B.D. Vernon	998	36.9	
Conservative	Miss W. Gordon	295	10.9	
Conservative	C. Belsey	289	10.7	
Communist	P.B. Kane	39	1.4	
Turnout		2,702		
Labour hold		Swing		
Labour hold		Swing		

Carshalton St Helier West (2)
Party	Candidate	Votes	%	±%
Labour	E.W. Goodall	1,165	37.3	
Labour	Mrs J.M. Morgan	1,088	34.8	
Conservative	Miss C.A. Gould	472	15.1	
Conservative	J.W. Pidgeon	400	12.8	
Turnout		3,125		
Labour hold		Swing		
Labour hold		Swing		

Carshalton South East (2)
Party	Candidate	Votes	%	±%
Conservative	G.F. Everitt	1,618	43.4	
Conservative	B.C. Fleming	1,547	41.5	
Labour	R.D. Everington	296	7.9	
Labour	J.G. Morgan	264	7.1	
Turnout		3,725		
Conservative hold		Swing		
Conservative hold		Swing		

Carshalton South West (2)
Party	Candidate	Votes	%	±%
Conservative	A.R. Wakefield	1,495	39.2	
Conservative	K.J. Martin	1,486	39.0	
Liberal	H.J. Sainsbury	355	9.3	
Liberal	J.G. Waller	344	9.0	
Labour	E.T. James	68	1.8	
Labour	Mrs M.E. Chapman	67	1.8	
Turnout		3,815		
Conservative hold		Swing		
Conservative hold		Swing		

Cheam North (2)
Party	Candidate	Votes	%	±%
Conservative	Miss A.M. Burrington	1,305	27.7	
Conservative	P.J.M Sinclair	1,288	27.3	
Liberal	D.A. Bigg	594	12.6	
Liberal	J.H. Hayns	577	12.2	
Labour	Mrs H.O. Judd	490	10.4	
Labour	J. Dowsett	463	9.8	
Turnout		4,717		
Conservative gain from Labour		Swing		
Conservative gain from Labour		Swing		

Cheam South (2)
Party	Candidate	Votes	%	±%
Conservative	G.P. Tobin	1,929	48.4	
Conservative	E.G. Trevor	1,920	48.2	
Labour	D. Jarman	69	1.7	
Labour	Mrs F. Lines	64	1.6	
Turnout		3,982		
Conservative hold		Swing		
Conservative hold		Swing		

Cheam West (2)
Party	Candidate	Votes	%	±%
Conservative	C.R.C. Fenson	1,399	39.7	
Conservative	L.S. Hill	1,378	39.1	
Liberal	A.J. Eagles	264	7.5	
Liberal	F.W. Sharp	248	7.0	
Labour	Mrs L.B.M. Barton	123	3.5	
Labour	L.P. Taft	113	3.2	
Turnout		3,525		
Conservative hold		Swing		
Conservative hold		Swing		

Sutton Central (2)
Party	Candidate	Votes	%	±%
Conservative	R.J. Jordan	675	24.0	
Conservative	D.P. Thomas	661	23.5	
Labour	E.C. Marshall	533	19.0	
Labour	Sidney James Barton	452	16.1	
Liberal	G.R. Watkin	217	7.7	
Liberal	A. Toots	211	7.5	
Communist	H. Cole	60	2.1	
Turnout		2,809		
Conservative gain from Labour		Swing		
Conservative gain from Labour		Swing		

Sutton East (2)
Party	Candidate	Votes	%	±%
Conservative	H.D. Burton	748	34.0	
Conservative	D. Edey	745	33.9	
Liberal	D.E. Strong	195	8.9	
Liberal	R.H. Insoll	193	8.8	
Labour	R.S. Williams	159	7.2	
Labour	F.W. Frewer	157	7.1	
Turnout		2,197		
Conservative hold		Swing		
Conservative hold		Swing		

Sutton North (2)
Party	Candidate	Votes	%	±%
Conservative	L.R. Brown	1,111	42.5	
Conservative	D.P. Madden	1,110	42.4	
Labour	A.C.T. Shepherd	203	7.8	
Labour	S.C. Terry	192	7.3	
Turnout		2,616		
Conservative hold		Swing		
Conservative hold		Swing		

Sutton North East (2)
Party	Candidate	Votes	%	±%
Conservative	S.F. Lever	1,338	38.0	
Conservative	N.G. Shelley	1,328	37.7	
Labour	E. Greenhalgh	434	12.3	
Labour	A.J. Barker	420	11.9	
Turnout		3,520		
Conservative hold		Swing		
Conservative hold		Swing		

Sutton South (2)
Party	Candidate	Votes	%	±%
Conservative	J.J. Nicholls	1,215	44.8	
Conservative	Mrs M.R. Grimes	1,207	44.5	
Labour	Miss J.K. Leech	158	5.8	
Labour	L.F. Starey	135	5.0	
Turnout		2,715		
Conservative hold		Swing		
Conservative hold		Swing		

Sutton South East (2)
Party	Candidate	Votes	%	±%
Conservative	T.F. Gadd	1,367	41.4	
Conservative	Miss F.A. Blackler	1,350	40.9	
Liberal	I. Nicholls	295	8.9	
Liberal	W.A. Neil	288	8.7	
Turnout		3,300		
Conservative hold		Swing		
Conservative hold		Swing		

Wallington Central (2)
Party	Candidate	Votes	%	±%
Conservative	E.W. Harding	1,140	26.4	
Conservative	Cdr E.G. Mason	1,110	25.7	
Residents	P.M. Prendergast	838	19.4	
Residents	R. Wane	791	18.3	
Labour	C.J. Brown	223	5.2	
Labour	J. Willmott	217	5.0	
Turnout		4,319		
Conservative gain from Residents		Swing		
Conservative gain from Residents		Swing		

(Residents and Ratepayers)

Wallington North (2)
Party	Candidate	Votes	%	±%
Residents	J.L. Izard	686	19.5	
Conservative	R.J.M. Akhurst	625	17.7	
Conservative	A.T. Jackson	607	17.2	
Residents	C.T. O'Reilly	602	17.1	
Labour	M.C. Smith	506	14.4	
Labour	Miss I.S.E. Tomlin	497	14.1	
Turnout		3,523		
Residents gain from Labour		Swing		
Conservative gain from Labour		Swing		

(Residents and Ratepayers)

Wallington South (2)
Party	Candidate	Votes	%	±%
Residents	H. Haydon	1,280	27.7	
Residents	H.R.C. Sawyers	1,108	23.9	
Conservative	D.F. Cockerill	1,058	22.9	
Conservative	C.A. Gaze	1,038	22.4	
Labour	L.A. Marchesi	145	3.1	
Turnout		4,629		
Residents hold		Swing		
Residents hold		Swing		

(Residents and Ratepayers)

Worcester Park North (2)
Party	Candidate	Votes	%	±%
Conservative	N.F. Paul	1,549	34.2	
Conservative	H. Sunderland	1,535	33.9	
Labour	H.F.L. Insoll	427	9.4	
Labour	Miss A.M.L. Hill	426	9.4	
Liberal	Mrs F.L. Seymour-Lee	314	9.6	
Liberal	B.C. Twyman	280	6.2	
Turnout		4,531		
Conservative hold		Swing		
Conservative hold		Swing		

Worcester Park South (2)
Party	Candidate	Votes	%	±%
Conservative	R.W. Ellis	1,226	29.2	
Conservative	W.D. Milne	1,206	28.7	
Liberal	A.H. Shaw	807	19.2	
Liberal	D.J. Eagle	806	19.2	
Labour	Mrs J.G. Baker	77	1.8	
Labour	J.W. Bradly	77	1.8	
Turnout		4,199		
Conservative hold		Swing		
Conservative hold		Swing		
