= 1968 Kingston upon Thames London Borough Council election =

The 1968 Kingston upon Thames Council election took place on 9 May 1968 to elect members of Kingston upon Thames London Borough Council in London, England. The whole council was up for election and the Conservative party stayed in overall control of the council.

== Ward results ==
Berrylands (4)
Party	Candidate	Votes	%	±%
Conservative				
Conservative				
Conservative				
Conservative				
Labour				
Labour				
Labour				
Labour				
Turnout				
Conservative hold		Swing		
Conservative hold		Swing		
Conservative hold		Swing		
Conservative hold		Swing		

Burlington (2)
Party	Candidate	Votes	%	±%
Conservative				
Conservative				
Labour				
Labour				
Turnout				
Conservative gain from Labour		Swing		
Conservative gain from Labour		Swing		

Cambridge (2)
Party	Candidate	Votes	%	±%
Conservative				
Conservative				
Labour				
Labour				
Turnout				
Conservative hold		Swing		
Conservative hold		Swing		

Canbury (3)
Party	Candidate	Votes	%	±%
Conservative				
Conservative				
Conservative				
Labour				
Labour				
Labour				
Communist				
Turnout				
Conservative gain from Labour		Swing		
Conservative gain from Labour		Swing		
Conservative gain from Labour		Swing		

Chessington (4)
Party	Candidate	Votes	%	±%
Conservative				
Conservative				
Conservative				
Conservative				
Labour				
Labour				
Labour				
Labour				
Turnout				
Conservative gain from Labour		Swing		
Conservative gain from Labour		Swing		
Conservative gain from Labour		Swing		
Conservative gain from Labour		Swing		

Coombe (2)
Party	Candidate	Votes	%	±%
Conservative				
Conservative				
Labour				
Labour				
Turnout				
Conservative hold		Swing		
Conservative hold		Swing		

Dickerage (2)
Party	Candidate	Votes	%	±%
Conservative				
Conservative				
Labour				
Independent				
Labour				
Independent				
Turnout				
Conservative gain from Labour		Swing		
Conservative gain from Labour		Swing		

Grove (3)
Party	Candidate	Votes	%	±%
Conservative				
Conservative				
Conservative				
Labour				
Labour				
Labour				
Turnout				
Conservative hold		Swing		
Conservative hold		Swing		
Conservative hold		Swing		

Hill (2)
Party	Candidate	Votes	%	±%
Conservative				
Conservative				
Liberal				
Labour				
Labour				
Turnout				
Conservative hold		Swing		
Conservative hold		Swing		

Hook & Southborough (4)
Party	Candidate	Votes	%	±%
Conservative				
Conservative				
Conservative				
Conservative				
Labour				
Labour				
Labour				
Labour				
Turnout				
Conservative hold		Swing		
Conservative hold		Swing		
Conservative hold		Swing		
Conservative gain from Labour		Swing		

Malden Green (2)
Party	Candidate	Votes	%	±%
Conservative				
Conservative				
Liberal				
Liberal				
Labour				
Labour				
Turnout				
Conservative hold		Swing		
Conservative hold		Swing		

Malden Manor (2)
Party	Candidate	Votes	%	±%
Conservative				
Conservative				
Labour				
Labour				
Turnout				
Conservative hold		Swing		
Conservative hold		Swing		

Mount (2)
Party	Candidate	Votes	%	±%
Conservative				
Conservative				
Labour				
Labour				
Communist				
Turnout				
Conservative hold		Swing		
Conservative hold		Swing		

Norbiton (2)
Party	Candidate	Votes	%	±%
Conservative				
Conservative				
Labour				
Labour				
Turnout				
Conservative gain from Labour		Swing		
Conservative gain from Labour		Swing		

Norbiton Park (2)
Party	Candidate	Votes	%	±%
Conservative				
Conservative				
Labour				
Labour				
Turnout				
Conservative hold		Swing		
Conservative hold		Swing		

Park (2)
Party	Candidate	Votes	%	±%
Conservative				
Conservative				
Labour				
Labour				
Liberal				
Turnout				
Conservative gain from Labour		Swing		
Conservative gain from Labour		Swing		

St James's (2)
Party	Candidate	Votes	%	±%
Conservative				
Conservative				
Liberal				
Liberal				
Labour				
Labour				
Turnout				
Conservative hold		Swing		
Conservative hold		Swing		

St Mark's & Seething Wells (4)
Party	Candidate	Votes	%	±%
Conservative				
Conservative				
Conservative				
Conservative				
Liberal				
Liberal				
Liberal				
Liberal				
Labour				
Labour				
Labour				
Labour				
Turnout				
Conservative hold		Swing		
Conservative hold		Swing		
Conservative hold		Swing		
Conservative hold		Swing		

Surbiton Hill (3)
Party	Candidate	Votes	%	±%
Conservative				
Conservative				
Conservative				
Independent				
Labour				
Labour				
Labour				
Turnout				
Conservative hold		Swing		
Conservative hold		Swing		
Conservative hold		Swing		

Tolworth East (3)
Party	Candidate	Votes	%	±%
Conservative				
Conservative				
Conservative				
Labour				
Labour				
Labour				
Turnout				
Conservative hold		Swing		
Conservative hold		Swing		
Conservative hold		Swing		

Tolworth South (2)
Party	Candidate	Votes	%	±%
Conservative				
Conservative				
Labour				
Labour				
Turnout				
Conservative gain from Labour		Swing		
Conservative gain from Labour		Swing		

Tolworth West (2)
Party	Candidate	Votes	%	±%
Conservative				
Labour				
Conservative				
Labour				
Communist				
Turnout				
Conservative gain from Labour		Swing		
Labour hold		Swing		

Town (2)
Party	Candidate	Votes	%	±%
Conservative				
Conservative				
Independent				
Labour				
Labour				
Turnout				
Conservative hold		Swing		
Conservative hold		Swing		

Tudor (2)
Party	Candidate	Votes	%	±%
Conservative				
Conservative				
Liberal				
Liberal				
Labour				
Labour				
Turnout				
Conservative hold		Swing		
Conservative hold		Swing		
