= List of United Kingdom locations: Bea-Bem =

The United Kingdom

This is part of the list of United Kingdom locations: a gazetteer of place names in the United Kingdom showing each place's locality and geographical coordinates.

== Be ==
=== Bea ===
Location	Locality	Coordinates (links to map & photo sources)	OS grid reference
Beach	South Gloucestershire	51.42°N 02.43°W	ST7070
Beachampton	Buckinghamshire	52.01°N 00.87°W	SP7736
Beachamwell	Norfolk	52.61°N 00.58°E	TF7505
Beach Hay	Worcestershire	52.36°N 02.42°W	SO7174
Beachlands	East Sussex	50.81°N 00.35°E	TQ6604
Beachley	Gloucestershire	51.61°N 02.65°W	ST5591
Beachy Head	East Sussex	50.73°N 00.25°E	TV590953
Beacon (Luppitt)	Devon	50.83°N 03.18°W	ST1705
Beacon (Yarcombe)	Devon	50.86°N 03.09°W	ST2308
Beacon	Cornwall	50.20°N 05.29°W	SW6539
Beacon Down	East Sussex	50.96°N 00.20°E	TQ5521
Beacon End	Essex	51.88°N 00.83°E	TL9524
Beacon Hill	Kent	51.05°N 00.59°E	TQ8232
Beacon Hill	Surrey	51.11°N 00.75°W	SU8736
Beacon Hill	Dorset	50.74°N 02.04°W	SY9794
Beacon Hill	Suffolk	52.07°N 01.25°E	TM2347
Beacon Hill	Essex	51.77°N 00.68°E	TL8512
Beacon Hill	Buckinghamshire	51.62°N 00.70°W	SU9093
Beacon Hill	Bath and North East Somerset	51.39°N 02.36°W	ST7566
Beaconhill	Northumberland	55.07°N 01.60°W	NZ2576
Beacon Hill	Cumbria	54.12°N 03.21°W	SD2170
Beacon Hill	Nottinghamshire	53.06°N 00.79°W	SK8153
Beacon Lough	Gateshead	54.92°N 01.58°W	NZ2759
Beacon's Bottom	Buckinghamshire	51.64°N 00.87°W	SU7895
Beaconsfield	Buckinghamshire	51.60°N 00.65°W	SU9390
Beaconside	Staffordshire	52.81°N 02.10°W	SJ9324
Beadlam	North Yorkshire	54.24°N 01.00°W	SE6584
Beadlow	Bedfordshire	52.02°N 00.39°W	TL1038
Beadnell	Northumberland	55.55°N 01.63°W	NU2329
Beaford	Devon	50.90°N 04.06°W	SS5514
Beal	Northumberland	55.67°N 01.90°W	NU0642
Beal	North Yorkshire	53.71°N 01.19°W	SE5325
Bealachandrain	Argyll and Bute	55.99°N 05.22°W	NR9983
Bealbury	Cornwall	50.47°N 04.29°W	SX3766
Beal's Green	Kent	51.05°N 00.50°E	TQ7631
Bealsmill	Cornwall	50.56°N 04.33°W	SX3576
Beam Bridge	Somerset	50.96°N 03.28°W	ST1019
Beambridge	Shropshire	52.48°N 02.69°W	SO5388
Beam Hill	Staffordshire	52.83°N 01.66°W	SK2326
Beamhurst	Staffordshire	52.92°N 01.92°W	SK0536
Beamhurst Lane	Staffordshire	52.91°N 01.91°W	SK0635
Beaminster	Dorset	50.80°N 02.75°W	ST4701
Beamish	Durham	54.87°N 01.65°W	NZ2253
Beamond End	Buckinghamshire	51.65°N 00.68°W	SU9196
Beamsley	North Yorkshire	53.96°N 01.89°W	SE0752
Bean	Kent	51.42°N 00.27°E	TQ5872
Beanacre	Wiltshire	51.38°N 02.14°W	ST9065
Beancross	Falkirk	55.99°N 03.74°W	NS9179
Beanhill	Milton Keynes	52.01°N 00.74°W	SP8636
Beanley	Northumberland	55.45°N 01.87°W	NU0818
Beansburn	East Ayrshire	55.61°N 04.49°W	NS4339
Beanthwaite	Cumbria	54.24°N 03.16°W	SD2484
Beaquoy	Orkney Islands	59.08°N 03.22°W	HY3022
Bear Cross	Bournemouth	50.77°N 01.92°W	SZ0697
Beard Hill	Somerset	51.15°N 02.54°W	ST6240
Beardly Batch	Somerset	51.16°N 02.54°W	ST6241
Beardwood	Lancashire	53.75°N 02.51°W	SD6629
Beare	Devon	50.79°N 03.44°W	SS9800
Beare Green	Surrey	51.17°N 00.32°W	TQ1743
Bearley	Warwickshire	52.23°N 01.73°W	SP1860
Bearley Cross	Warwickshire	52.23°N 01.76°W	SP1660
Bearpark	Durham	54.78°N 01.64°W	NZ2343
Bearsbridge	Northumberland	54.90°N 02.34°W	NY7857
Bearsted	Kent	51.26°N 00.56°E	TQ7955
Bearstone	Shropshire	52.94°N 02.41°W	SJ7239
Bearwood	Poole	50.77°N 01.93°W	SZ0597
Bearwood	Sandwell	52.47°N 01.97°W	SP0286
Bearwood	Herefordshire	52.19°N 02.90°W	SO3856
Beasley	Staffordshire	53.03°N 02.25°W	SJ8349
Beattock	Dumfries and Galloway	55.30°N 03.46°W	NT0702
Beauchamp Roding	Essex	51.76°N 00.28°E	TL5810
Beauchief	Sheffield	53.32°N 01.50°W	SK3381
Beauclerc	Northumberland	54.94°N 02.00°W	NZ0061
Beaudesert	Warwickshire	52.29°N 01.78°W	SP1566
Beaufort	Blaenau Gwent	51.79°N 03.21°W	SO1611
Beaulieu	Hampshire	50.81°N 01.46°W	SU3802
Beaulieu Wood	Dorset	50.85°N 02.42°W	ST7006
Beauly	Highland	57.48°N 04.47°W	NH5246
Beaumaris	Isle of Anglesey	53.26°N 04.10°W	SH6076
Beaumont	Berkshire	51.44°N 00.57°W	SU9973
Beaumont	Cumbria	54.92°N 03.03°W	NY3459
Beaumont	Essex	51.88°N 01.15°E	TM1725
Beaumont Hill	Darlington	54.55°N 01.55°W	NZ2918
Beaumont Leys	City of Leicester	52.66°N 01.17°W	SK5608
Beausale	Warwickshire	52.32°N 01.66°W	SP2370
Beauvale (Hucknall)	Nottinghamshire	53.02°N 01.22°W	SK5248
Beauvale (Eastwood)	Nottinghamshire	53.00°N 01.28°W	SK4846
Beauworth	Hampshire	51.02°N 01.18°W	SU5725
Beavan's Hill	Herefordshire	51.91°N 02.48°W	SO6724
Beaworthy	Devon	50.76°N 04.19°W	SX4599
Beazley End	Essex	51.93°N 00.52°E	TL7429

=== Beb–Bed ===
Location	Locality	Coordinates (links to map & photo sources)	OS grid reference
Bebington	Wirral	53.34°N 03.00°W	SJ3383
Bebside	Northumberland	55.12°N 01.56°W	NZ2881
Beccles	Suffolk	52.45°N 01.56°E	TM4290
Becconsall	Lancashire	53.69°N 02.84°W	SD4422
Beck Bottom	Cumbria	54.24°N 03.09°W	SD2984
Beck Bottom	Wakefield	53.70°N 01.54°W	SE3023
Beckbury	Shropshire	52.60°N 02.35°W	SJ7601
Beckces	Cumbria	54.63°N 02.91°W	NY4127
Beckenham	Bromley	51.40°N 00.03°W	TQ3769
Beckermet	Cumbria	54.44°N 03.52°W	NY0106
Beckermonds	North Yorkshire	54.21°N 02.20°W	SD8780
Beckery	Somerset	51.13°N 02.74°W	ST4838
Beckett End	Norfolk	52.55°N 00.60°E	TL7798
Beckfoot	Cumbria	54.82°N 03.41°W	NY0949
Beck Foot	Cumbria	54.35°N 02.60°W	SD6196
Beck Foot	Bradford	53.83°N 01.84°W	SE1038
Beckford	Worcestershire	52.01°N 02.04°W	SO9735
Beckhampton	Wiltshire	51.41°N 01.88°W	SU0868
Beck Head	Cumbria	54.24°N 02.86°W	SD4484
Beck Houses	Cumbria	54.35°N 02.64°W	SD5896
Beckingham	Nottinghamshire	53.40°N 00.84°W	SK7790
Beckingham	Lincolnshire	53.06°N 00.70°W	SK8753
Beckington	Somerset	51.25°N 02.28°W	ST8051
Beckjay	Shropshire	52.38°N 02.89°W	SO3977
Beckley	East Sussex	50.97°N 00.63°E	TQ8523
Beckley	Hampshire	50.76°N 01.68°W	SZ2296
Beckley	Oxfordshire	51.78°N 01.18°W	SP5610
Beckley Furnace	East Sussex	50.95°N 00.60°E	TQ8321
Beck Row	Suffolk	52.36°N 00.48°E	TL6977
Beck Side (Cartmel)	Cumbria	54.21°N 02.96°W	SD3780
Beck Side (Kirkby-in-Furness)	Cumbria	54.22°N 03.18°W	SD2382
Beckside (Killington)	Cumbria	54.28°N 02.60°W	SD6188
Beckton	Newham	51.51°N 00.05°E	TQ4381
Beckwith	North Yorkshire	53.96°N 01.57°W	SE2852
Beckwithshaw	North Yorkshire	53.96°N 01.60°W	SE2652
Becontree	Barking and Dagenham	51.54°N 00.13°E	TQ4885
Bedale	North Yorkshire	54.28°N 01.60°W	SE2688
Bedburn	Durham	54.67°N 01.84°W	NZ1031
Bedchester	Dorset	50.95°N 02.21°W	ST8517
Beddau	Rhondda, Cynon, Taff	51.55°N 03.37°W	ST0585
Beddgelert	Gwynedd	53.01°N 04.10°W	SH5948
Beddingham	East Sussex	50.84°N 00.04°E	TQ4407
Beddington	Sutton	51.36°N 00.13°W	TQ3065
Beddington Corner	Sutton	51.37°N 00.16°W	TQ2866
Bedersaig	Western Isles	57.98°N 07.09°W	NA9911
Bedfield	Suffolk	52.24°N 01.25°E	TM2266
Bedford	Bedfordshire	52.12°N 00.46°W	TL0549
Bedford	Wigan	53.48°N 02.49°W	SJ6799
Bedford Park	Ealing	51.49°N 00.25°W	TQ2179
Bedgebury Cross	Kent	51.08°N 00.44°E	TQ7134
Bedgrove	Buckinghamshire	51.80°N 00.78°W	SP8412
Bedham	West Sussex	50.97°N 00.56°W	TQ0121
Bedhampton	Hampshire	50.84°N 01.00°W	SU7006
Bedingfield	Suffolk	52.26°N 01.19°E	TM1868
Bedingham Green	Norfolk	52.47°N 01.35°E	TM2892
Bedlam	North Yorkshire	54.04°N 01.60°W	SE2661
Bedlam	Somerset	51.23°N 02.35°W	ST7549
Bedlam Street	West Sussex	50.92°N 00.19°W	TQ2715
Bedlar's Green	Essex	51.85°N 00.20°E	TL5220
Bedlington	Northumberland	55.12°N 01.59°W	NZ2681
Bedlington Station	Northumberland	55.13°N 01.57°W	NZ2782
Bedlinog	Merthyr Tydfil	51.70°N 03.31°W	SO0901
Bedminster	City of Bristol	51.43°N 02.60°W	ST5871
Bedminster Down	City of Bristol	51.41°N 02.61°W	ST5769
Bedmond	Hertfordshire	51.71°N 00.42°W	TL0903
Bednall	Staffordshire	52.75°N 02.07°W	SJ9517
Bednall Head	Staffordshire	52.75°N 02.06°W	SJ9617
Bedrule	Scottish Borders	55.45°N 02.63°W	NT6018
Bedstone	Shropshire	52.36°N 02.94°W	SO3675
Bedwas	Caerphilly	51.59°N 03.19°W	ST1789
Bedwell	Hertfordshire	51.90°N 00.19°W	TL2424
Bedwell	Wrexham	53.00°N 02.95°W	SJ3646
Bedwellty	Caerphilly	51.69°N 03.21°W	SO1600
Bedwellty Pits	Blaenau Gwent	51.74°N 03.23°W	SO1506
Bedwlwyn	Wrexham	52.91°N 03.16°W	SJ2236
Bedworth	Warwickshire	52.47°N 01.48°W	SP3586
Bedworth Heath	Warwickshire	52.47°N 01.50°W	SP3486
Bedworth Woodlands	Warwickshire	52.48°N 01.50°W	SP3487

=== Bee ===
Location	Locality	Coordinates (links to map & photo sources)	OS grid reference
Beeby	Leicestershire	52.66°N 01.02°W	SK6608
Beech	Hampshire	51.13°N 01.01°W	SU6938
Beech	Staffordshire	52.93°N 02.22°W	SJ8538
Beechcliff	Staffordshire	52.93°N 02.22°W	SJ8538
Beechcliffe	Bradford	53.87°N 01.92°W	SE0542
Beechen Cliff	Bath and North East Somerset	51.37°N 02.36°W	ST7564
Beech Hill	Berkshire	51.37°N 01.01°W	SU6964
Beech Hill	Wigan	53.55°N 02.66°W	SD5607
Beechingstoke	Wiltshire	51.33°N 01.88°W	SU0859
Beech Lanes	Birmingham	52.46°N 01.98°W	SP0185
Beechwood	Cheshire	53.31°N 02.70°W	SJ5380
Beechwood	City of Newport	51.58°N 02.96°W	ST3388
Beechwood	Highland	57.46°N 04.18°W	NH6944
Beechwood	Leeds	53.81°N 01.48°W	SE3436
Beechwood	Solihull	52.38°N 01.61°W	SP2676
Beecroft	Bedfordshire	51.88°N 00.54°W	TL0022
Beedon	Berkshire	51.49°N 01.30°W	SU4878
Beedon Hill	Berkshire	51.49°N 01.30°W	SU4877
Beeford	East Riding of Yorkshire	53.97°N 00.29°W	TA1254
Beeley	Derbyshire	53.19°N 01.61°W	SK2667
Beelsby	North East Lincolnshire	53.49°N 00.19°W	TA2001
Beenham	Berkshire	51.40°N 01.16°W	SU5868
Beenham's Heath	Berkshire	51.46°N 00.79°W	SU8475
Beenham Stocks	Berkshire	51.40°N 01.15°W	SU5968
Beeny	Cornwall	50.69°N 04.67°W	SX1192
Beer	Devon	50.69°N 03.10°W	SY2289
Beer	Somerset	51.07°N 02.85°W	ST4031
Beercrocombe	Somerset	50.97°N 02.97°W	ST3220
Beer Hackett	Dorset	50.89°N 02.58°W	ST5911
Beer Head	Devon	50.68°N 03.09°W	SY227881
Beesands	Devon	50.24°N 03.67°W	SX8140
Beesby	Lincolnshire	53.29°N 00.18°E	TF4680
Beeslack	Midlothian	55.83°N 03.21°W	NT2461
Beeson	Devon	50.24°N 03.67°W	SX8140
Beeston	Bedfordshire	52.11°N 00.30°W	TL1648
Beeston	Leeds	53.76°N 01.57°W	SE2830
Beeston	Cheshire	53.11°N 02.68°W	SJ5458
Beeston	Norfolk	52.69°N 00.81°E	TF9015
Beeston	Nottinghamshire	52.91°N 01.22°W	SK5236
Beeston Hill	Leeds	53.77°N 01.56°W	SE2931
Beeston Park Side	Leeds	53.75°N 01.56°W	SE2929
Beeston Regis	Norfolk	52.93°N 01.21°E	TG1642
Beeston Royds	Leeds	53.76°N 01.60°W	SE2630
Beeston St Lawrence	Norfolk	52.73°N 01.43°E	TG3221
Beeswing	Dumfries and Galloway	55.00°N 03.73°W	NX8969
Beetham	Cumbria	54.20°N 02.78°W	SD4979
Beetham	Somerset	50.90°N 03.03°W	ST2712
Beetley	Norfolk	52.71°N 00.91°E	TF9717

=== Bef–Beh ===
Location	Locality	Coordinates (links to map & photo sources)	OS grid reference
Beffcote	Staffordshire	52.76°N 02.29°W	SJ8019
Began	Caerdydd (Cardiff)	51.54°N 03.12°W	ST2283
Begbroke	Oxfordshire	51.81°N 01.31°W	SP4713
Begdale	Cambridgeshire	52.63°N 00.14°E	TF4506
Begelly	Pembrokeshire	51.73°N 04.73°W	SN1107
Beggar Hill	Essex	51.68°N 00.35°E	TL6301
Beggarington	Kirklees	53.70°N 01.72°W	SE1823
Beggarington Hill	City of Leeds	53.71°N 01.59°W	SE2724
Beggars Ash	Herefordshire	52.04°N 02.43°W	SO7039
Beggars Bush	West Sussex	50.85°N 00.35°W	TQ1607
Beggars Pound	The Vale Of Glamorgan	51.40°N 03.42°W	ST0168
Beggearn Huish	Somerset	51.14°N 03.37°W	ST0439
Beguildy	Powys	52.40°N 03.19°W	SO1979

=== Bei–Bel ===
Location	Locality	Coordinates (links to map & photo sources)	OS grid reference
Beighton	Norfolk	52.60°N 01.51°E	TG3807
Beighton	Sheffield	53.34°N 01.34°W	SK4483
Beighton Hill	Derbyshire	53.05°N 01.56°W	SK2951
Beili-glas	Monmouthshire	51.78°N 03.01°W	SO3010
Beinn Casgro	Western Isles	58.14°N 06.40°W	NB4126
Beith	North Ayrshire	55.74°N 04.64°W	NS3453
Bekesbourne	Kent	51.25°N 01.13°E	TR1955
Bekesbourne Hill	Kent	51.26°N 01.12°E	TR1856
Belah	Cumbria	54.90°N 02.95°W	NY3957
Belan	Powys	52.62°N 03.18°W	SJ2004
Belaugh	Norfolk	52.71°N 01.37°E	TG2818
Belbroughton	Worcestershire	52.38°N 02.13°W	SO9176
Belby	East Riding of Yorkshire	53.75°N 00.83°W	SE771289
Belchalwell	Dorset	50.88°N 02.29°W	ST7909
Belchalwell Street	Dorset	50.88°N 02.29°W	ST7909
Belchamp Otten	Essex	52.03°N 00.62°E	TL8041
Belchamp St Paul	Essex	52.04°N 00.60°E	TL7942
Belchamp Walter	Essex	52.02°N 00.63°E	TL8140
Belcher's Bar	Leicestershire	52.66°N 01.40°W	SK4008
Belchford	Lincolnshire	53.25°N 00.06°W	TF2975
Belfast	Antrim	54.60°N 05.91°W	J3474
Belfatton	Aberdeenshire	57.58°N 01.98°W	NK0155
Belfield	Rochdale	53.61°N 02.13°W	SD9113
Belford	Northumberland	55.59°N 01.84°W	NU1033
Belgrano	Conwy	53.28°N 03.57°W	SH9578
Belgrave	Lancashire	53.68°N 02.21°W	SD8621
Belgrave	Cheshire	53.14°N 02.92°W	SJ3861
Belgrave	City of Leicester	52.64°N 01.12°W	SK5906
Belgrave	Staffordshire	52.61°N 01.67°W	SK2202
Belgravia	Royal Borough of Kensington and Chelsea	51.49°N 00.15°W	TQ2879
Belhaven	East Lothian	55.99°N 02.54°W	NT6678
Belhelvie	Aberdeenshire	57.24°N 02.10°W	NJ9417
Bellabeg	Aberdeenshire	57.20°N 03.07°W	NJ3513
Bellahouston	City of Glasgow	55.83°N 04.31°W	NS5563
Bellanoch	Argyll and Bute	56.07°N 05.53°W	NR8092
Bellanrigg	Scottish Borders	55.63°N 03.22°W	NT2338
Bellasize	East Riding of Yorkshire	53.73°N 00.75°W	SE8227
Bell Bar	Hertfordshire	51.73°N 00.19°W	TL2505
Bellbrae	Fife	56.30°N 03.01°W	NO3713
Bell Busk	North Yorkshire	54.00°N 02.15°W	SD9056
Bell Common	Essex	51.68°N 00.08°E	TL4401
Belleau	Lincolnshire	53.28°N 00.09°E	TF4078
Belle Eau Park	Nottinghamshire	53.12°N 01.01°W	SK6659
Belle Green	Barnsley	53.57°N 01.41°W	SE3909
Belle Grove	Bexley	51.465°N 00.100°E	TQ459760
Belle Isle	Cumbria	54.36°N 02.93°W	SD395967
Belle Isle	Leeds	53.75°N 01.53°W	SE3129
Bell End	Worcestershire	52.39°N 02.08°W	SO9477
Bellerby	North Yorkshire	54.32°N 01.83°W	SE1192
Belle Vale	Dudley	52.45°N 02.07°W	SO9584
Belle Vale	Liverpool	53.38°N 02.87°W	SJ4288
Bellever	Devon	50.57°N 03.90°W	SX6577
Bellevue	Worcestershire	52.36°N 02.04°W	SO9774
Belle Vue (Carlisle)	Cumbria	54.88°N 02.98°W	NY3755
Belle Vue (Papcastle)	Cumbria	54.66°N 03.38°W	NY1131
Belle Vue	Wakefield	53.66°N 01.48°W	SE3419
Belle Vue	Manchester	53.46°N 02.19°W	SJ8796
Belle Vue	Doncaster	53.51°N 01.11°W	SE5902
Belle Vue	Shropshire	52.69°N 02.75°W	SJ4911
Bellfield	East Ayrshire	55.58°N 04.49°W	NS4335
Bellfields	Surrey	51.24°N 00.58°W	SU9951
Bell Green	Coventry	52.42°N 01.47°W	SP3681
Bell Green	Lewisham	51.43°N 00.04°W	TQ3672
Bell Heath	Worcestershire	52.39°N 02.07°W	SO9577
Bell Hill	Hampshire	51.01°N 00.94°W	SU7424
Bellingdon	Buckinghamshire	51.73°N 00.64°W	SP9405
Bellingham	Bromley	51.42°N 00.03°W	TQ3771
Bellingham	Northumberland	55.14°N 02.26°W	NY8383
Bellmount	Norfolk	52.76°N 00.28°E	TF5421
Bellochantuy	Argyll and Bute	55.52°N 05.70°W	NR6632
Bell o' th' Hill	Cheshire	53.00°N 02.71°W	SJ5245
Bellsbank	East Ayrshire	55.30°N 04.41°W	NS4704
Bell's Close	Gateshead	54.97°N 01.70°W	NZ1964
Bell's Corner	Suffolk	51.99°N 00.89°E	TL9937
Bellshill	North Lanarkshire	55.80°N 04.04°W	NS7259
Bellside	North Lanarkshire	55.80°N 03.91°W	NS8058
Bellsmyre	West Dunbartonshire	55.95°N 04.56°W	NS4076
Bellspool	Scottish Borders	55.60°N 03.33°W	NT1635
Bellsquarry	West Lothian	55.86°N 03.53°W	NT0465
Bells Yew Green	East Sussex	51.10°N 00.28°E	TQ6036
Belluton	Bath and North East Somerset	51.37°N 02.56°W	ST6164
Bellyeoman	Fife	56.07°N 03.44°W	NT1088
Belmesthorpe	Rutland	52.67°N 00.46°W	TF0410
Belmont	Bromley	51.423°N 00.071°E	TQ441714
Belmont	East Sussex	50.86°N 00.59°E	TQ8310
Belmont	Harrow	51.59°N 00.32°W	TQ1690
Belmont	Shetland Islands	60.68°N 00.97°W	HP5600
Belmont	Sutton	51.34°N 00.20°W	TQ2562
Belmont	South Ayrshire	55.44°N 04.62°W	NS3420
Belmont	Durham	54.78°N 01.53°W	NZ3043
Belmont	Lancashire	53.63°N 02.50°W	SD6716
Belnacraig	Aberdeenshire	57.23°N 03.04°W	NJ3716
Belnahua	Argyll and Bute	56.25°N 05.69°W	NM713126
Belnie	Lincolnshire	52.85°N 00.14°W	TF2530
Belowda	Cornwall	50.41°N 04.87°W	SW9661
Belper	Derbyshire	53.01°N 01.47°W	SK3547
Belper Lane End	Derbyshire	53.03°N 01.50°W	SK3349
Belph	Derbyshire	53.26°N 01.19°W	SK5475
Belsay	Northumberland	55.09°N 01.84°W	NZ1078
Belsford	Devon	50.41°N 03.74°W	SX7659
Belsize	Hertfordshire	51.68°N 00.51°W	TL0300
Belstead	Suffolk	52.02°N 01.10°E	TM1341
Belston	South Ayrshire	55.44°N 04.56°W	NS3820
Belstone	Devon	50.72°N 03.97°W	SX6193
Belstone Corner	Devon	50.76°N 03.95°W	SX6298
Belthorn	Lancashire	53.71°N 02.44°W	SD7124
Beltinge	Kent	51.36°N 01.14°E	TR1968
Beltingham	Northumberland	54.96°N 02.34°W	NY7863
Beltoft	North Lincolnshire	53.54°N 00.79°W	SE8006
Belton	Leicestershire	52.77°N 01.34°W	SK4420
Belton	Lincolnshire	52.94°N 00.63°W	SK9239
Belton	Norfolk	52.55°N 01.65°E	TG4802
Belton	North Lincolnshire	53.54°N 00.82°W	SE7806
Belton-in-Rutland	Rutland	52.60°N 00.80°W	SK8101
Beltring	Kent	51.19°N 00.38°E	TQ6747
Belvedere	Bexley	51.48°N 00.14°E	TQ4978
Belvedere	West Lothian	55.90°N 03.66°W	NS9669
Belvoir	Leicestershire	52.88°N 00.78°W	SK8233

=== Bem ===
Location	Locality	Coordinates (links to map & photo sources)	OS grid reference
Bembridge	Isle of Wight	50.67°N 01.09°W	SZ6487
Bemersyde	Scottish Borders	55.58°N 02.65°W	NT5933
Bemerton	Wiltshire	51.06°N 01.83°W	SU1230
Bemerton Heath	Wiltshire	51.07°N 01.83°W	SU1231
Bempton	East Riding of Yorkshire	54.13°N 00.18°W	TA1972
