= Wethersfield, Essex =

Village in Essex, England

Coordinates: 51.9536°N 0.4889°E

Wethersfield
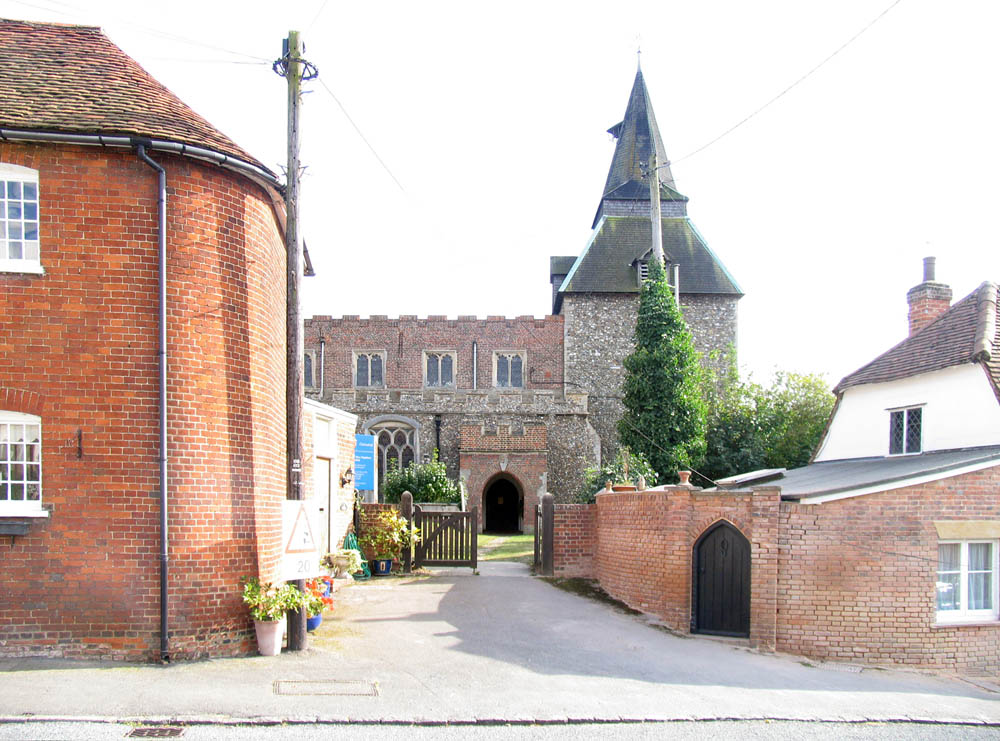
- Church of St Mary Magdalene and St Mary the Virgin, Wethersfield

- Location within Essex
- Population: 1,295 (Parish, 2021)
- OS grid reference: TL7131
- District: Braintree
- Shire county: Essex
- Region: East
- Country: England
- Sovereign state: United Kingdom
- Post town: BRAINTREE
- Postcode district: CM7
- Dialling code: 01371
- Police: Essex
- Fire: Essex
- Ambulance: East of England
- UK Parliament: Braintree

Wethersfield is a village and civil parish on the B1053 road in the Braintree district of Essex, England. As well as the village itself, the parish also includes the hamlets of Beazley End, Blackmore End, and Brickkiln Green. It is near the River Pant. Wethersfield has a school, a social club, a fire station and one place of worship. Nearby settlements include the town of Braintree and the village of Finchingfield. At the 2021 census the parish had a population of 1,295.

The name is Old English and means the open land or clearing belonging to someone called Wether.

Patrick Brontë, father of the Brontë sisters, was a young curate here in 1807, as was John West, later missionary to Canada, who married Harriet Atkinson here in 1807.

MDP Wethersfield was the headquarters and training centre for the Ministry of Defence Police until 2022, located at the former RAF Station Wethersfield, and was used by the RAF, United States Army Air Force (USAAF) and the United States Air Force (USAF). It is now used to house asylum seekers.

The village is also one of The Hundred Parishes.

Wethersfield, Essex is the namesake of Wethersfield, Connecticut.
