= Harrow & Wealdstone station =

London Underground and railway station

Harrow & Wealdstone
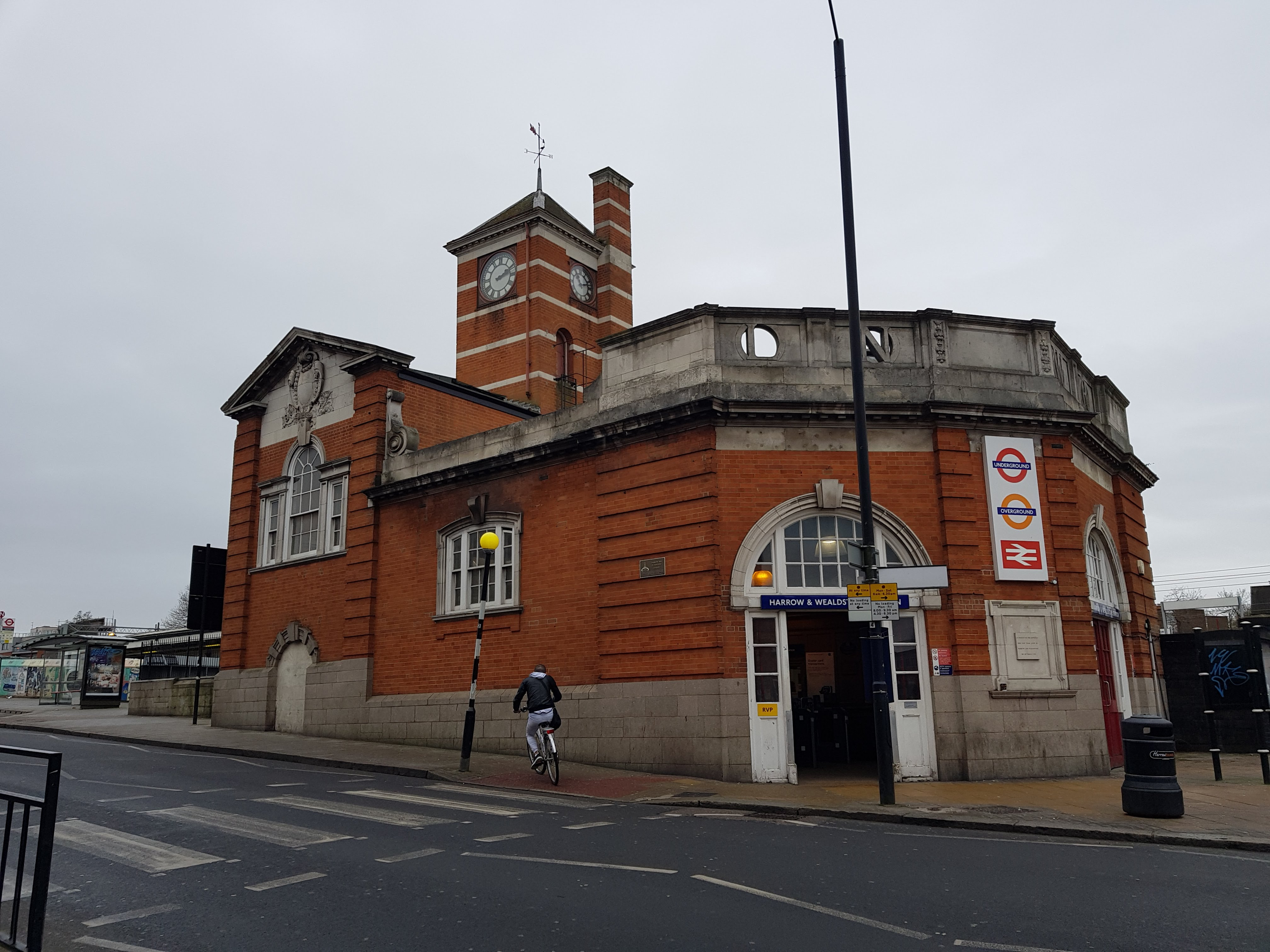
- Harrow & Wealdstone station entrance from The Bridge
- Interactive map of Harrow & Wealdstone

General information
- Location: Wealdstone
- Local authority: London Borough of Harrow
- Managed by: London Underground
- Owner: Network Rail
- Station code: HRW
- DfT category: C1
- Number of platforms: 6
- Accessible: Yes
- Fare zone: 5

London Underground annual entry and exit
- 2020: ▼3.03 million
- 2021: ▼2.08 million
- 2022: ▲3.23 million
- 2023: ▲3.54 million
- 2024: ▲5.14 million

National Rail annual entry and exit
- 2020–21: ▼1.266 million
- Interchange: ▼60,199
- 2021–22: ▲2.366 million
- Interchange: ▲0.127 million
- 2022–23: ▲2.805 million
- Interchange: ▲0.337 million
- 2023–24: ▲3.389 million
- Interchange: ▲0.399 million
- 2024–25: ▲3.967 million
- Interchange: ▲0.496 million

Key dates
- 20 July 1837: Opened (L&BR)
- 18 December 1890: Opened Stanmore branch line (L&NwR)
- 16 April 1917: Started (Bakerloo line)
- 8 October 1952: Train crash
- 5 October 1964: Closed Stanmore branch line (BR)
- 24 September 1982: Ended (Bakerloo line)
- 4 June 1984: Restarted as terminus (Bakerloo line)

Listed status
- Listed feature: East side/bridge West side/platforms
- Listing grade: II
- Entry number: 1253982; 1253986
- Added to list: 6 September 1989; 13 July 1990

Other information
- External links: TfL station info page; Departures; Facilities
- Coordinates: 51.5925°N 0.3355°W

Harrow & Wealdstone (/ˈhæroʊ ənd ˈwiːldstoʊn/) is an interchange station in north-west London. It is located in both Harrow and Wealdstone in the London Borough of Harrow. The station provides southbound Bakerloo line services of the London Underground; Lioness line services of the London Overground; and National Rail services operated by London Northwestern Railway and Southern on the West Coast Main Line (WCML).

Harrow & Wealdstone is 11 miles 30 chains (18.31 km) along the WCML from London Euston station. It is located between The Bridge (which joins the southern end of High Street) and Sandridge Close, with entrances leading to both. It is one of the oldest stations in the London region still in existence. The Harrow and Wealdstone rail crash of 1952, which killed 112 people, occurred at the station and remains the worst peacetime rail disaster in the United Kingdom.

== History ==
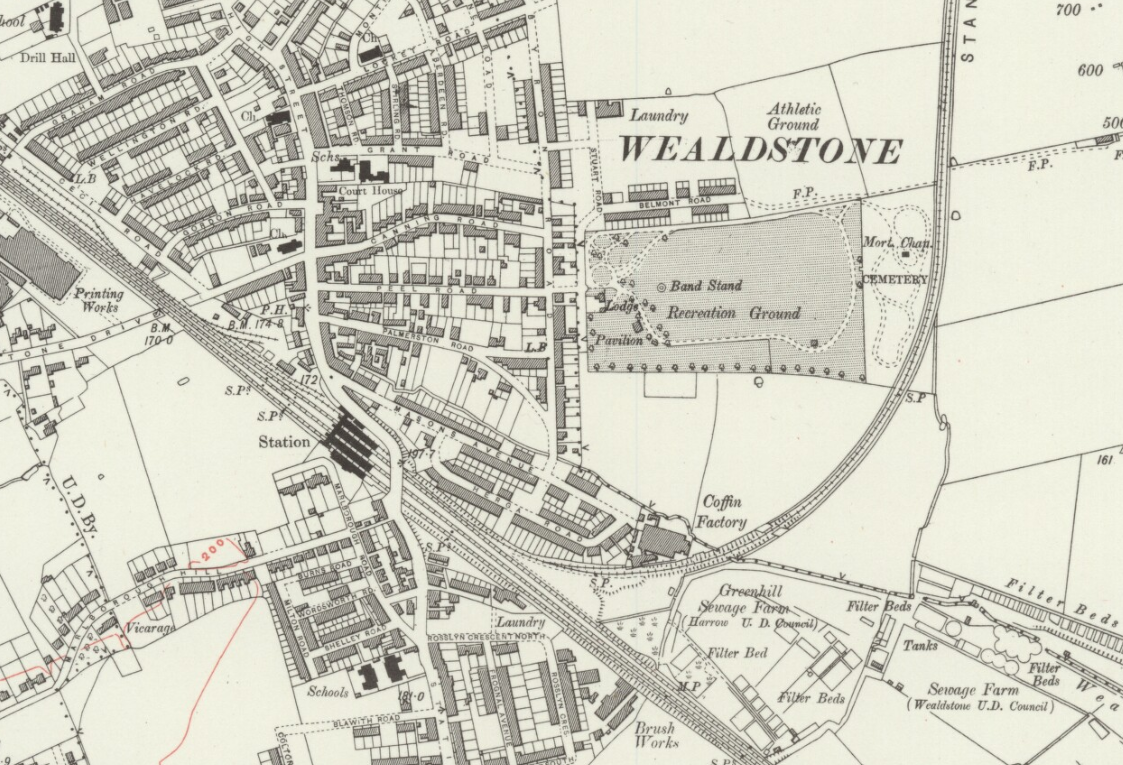
Harrow & Wealdstone station in 1916

The station was opened by the London and Birmingham Railway (L&BR) as Harrow on 20 July 1837 in what was then rural Middlesex. At the time the station was built, the area was fields and the nearest large settlement was at Harrow on the Hill about 1.5 miles (2.4 km) to the south. Wealdstone was a collection of houses at the north end of what is now Wealdstone High Street, about 1 mile (1.6 km) north of the station. The station buildings on the south west (Harrow) side of the station are the older part of the station, located beside what were the fast lines until the platforms were used for the later Euston to Watford DC line and the main line tracks were re-routed through the previous slow line platforms and new platforms (numbers 5 and 6) to the north east; a new, larger, station building was also erected on this Wealdstone side of the station in 1912. The station footbridge was originally constructed with a full-height central barrier with passengers using the "London" side and railway and postal staff using the "country" side to move goods and mail via lifts which were removed in the early 1970s, leaving two parcel elevators serving the DC line platforms for the remaining postal traffic.

On 18 December 1890, a short branch line known as the Stanmore branch line was opened by the London & North Western Railway (LNWR, successor to the L&BR). It ran 2.12 miles (3.41 km) north-east from the main line to Stanmore. In 1932 an intermediate halt was constructed as Belmont to serve the developing residential areas locally. The train was known affectionately as the "Belmont Rattler".

By the end of the 19th century Wealdstone had developed in size and the station was given its current name on 1 May 1897 to reflect more accurately its location.

On 16 April 1917, Bakerloo line services were extended from Willesden Junction to Watford Junction running on the newly electrified local tracks (the New Lines, which were originally steam-worked) and calling at Harrow & Wealdstone from that date.

On 15 September 1952, the passenger service to Stanmore – by then renamed Stanmore Village to avoid confusion with the Metropolitan Railway's (later Bakerloo, and now Jubilee) station opened in 1934 – was withdrawn. Freight traffic (particularly the storage of bananas) continued sporadically until 1964.

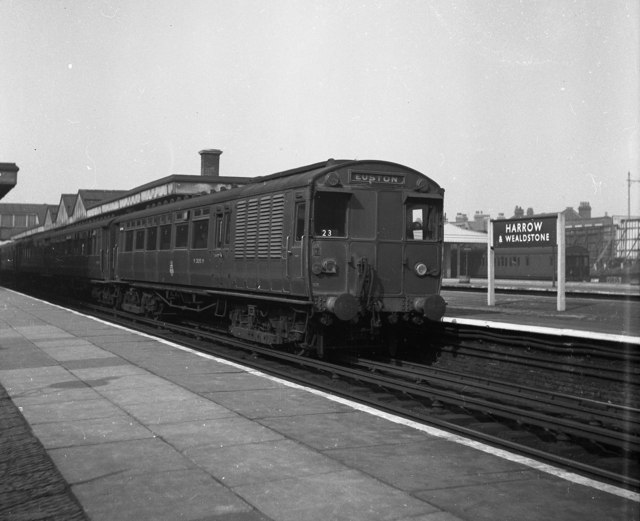
Oerlikon electric train at Harrow & Wealdstone, 11 March 1956

During the early 1960s, as part of the West Coast Main Line electrification, the bridge carrying the A409 road (The Bridge/Station Approach) over the railway was rebuilt easing the previous severe road gradients and offering higher clearance over the tracks to allow for overhead catenary cabling.

On 5 October 1964, all services on the branch line to Belmont were withdrawn as part of the cuts of the Beeching Axe. The permanent way north of Harrow and Wealdstone station was removed but the disused platform 7 on the eastern side of the station was left in place as a siding for a further few years until it too was removed.

On 24 September 1982, Bakerloo line services to Harrow & Wealdstone ended when services north of Stonebridge Park were ended. However the closure was short-lived, and the Bakerloo line to Harrow & Wealdstone was reinstated on 4 June 1984 with the station acting as the terminus.

In the 1990s major reconstruction of local roads made to by-pass High Street, Wealdstone sent a new road (Ellen Webb Drive) through what remained of the station goods yard and part of the forecourt of the eastern entrance (1917) to the station.

== Accidents and incidents ==
- On 7 August 1838 Thomas Port was fatally injured when he fell from a train and was run over about 1 1/4 miles (2 km) south of the station.
- In 1870, a mail train was in a rear-end collision with a freight train. Eight people were killed, including the cricketer James Rowley.
- Harrow and Wealdstone rail crash: On 8 October 1952, the station was the site of the worst peacetime railway disaster in British history when 112 people were killed and 340 were injured as a result of a Scottish express train colliding with the rear of a local train standing at platform 4. Seconds later a northbound express hauled by two locomotives collided with the wreckage causing further injury and demolished one span of the footbridge and the northern end of platforms 2 and 3. A memorial plaque was placed above the main entrance on the eastern side of the station to mark the 50th anniversary in 2002.

== Facilities ==
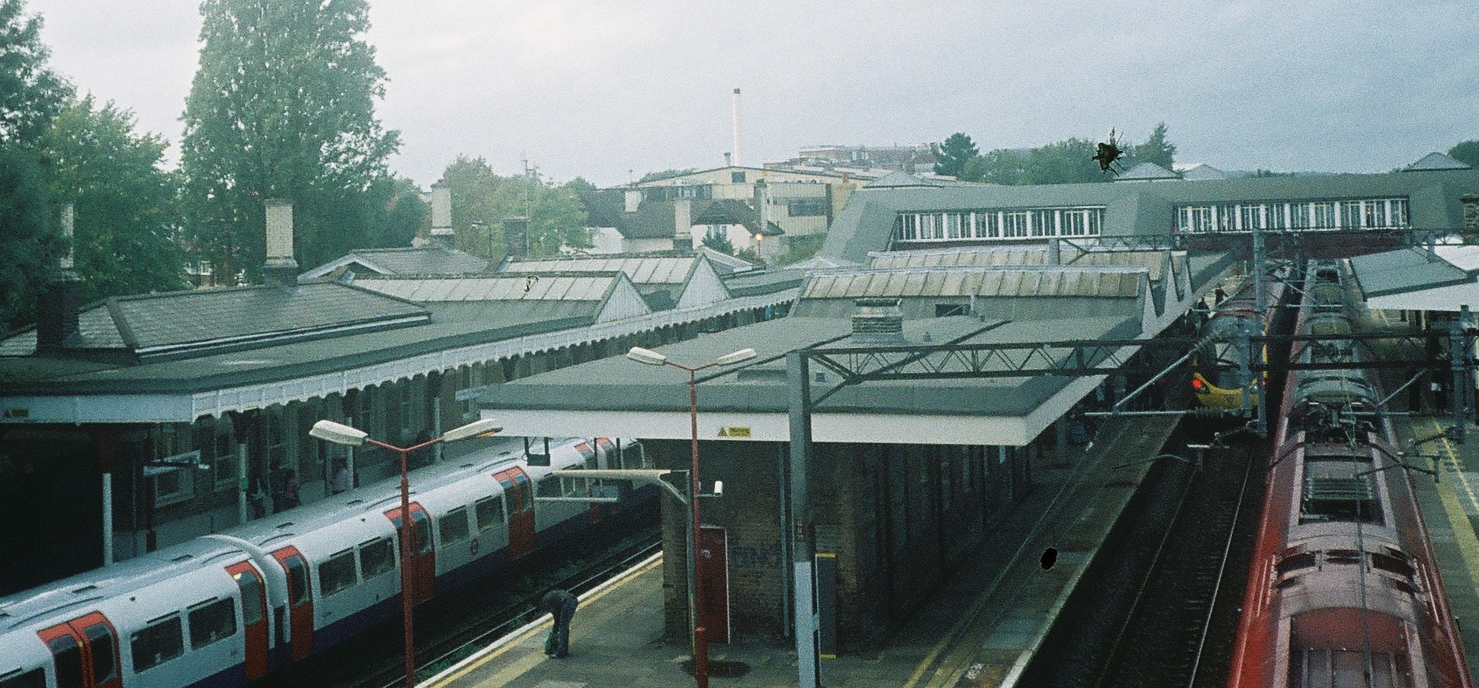
Harrow and Wealdstone station, with the DC electric platforms to the left, and main line fast platforms to the right.

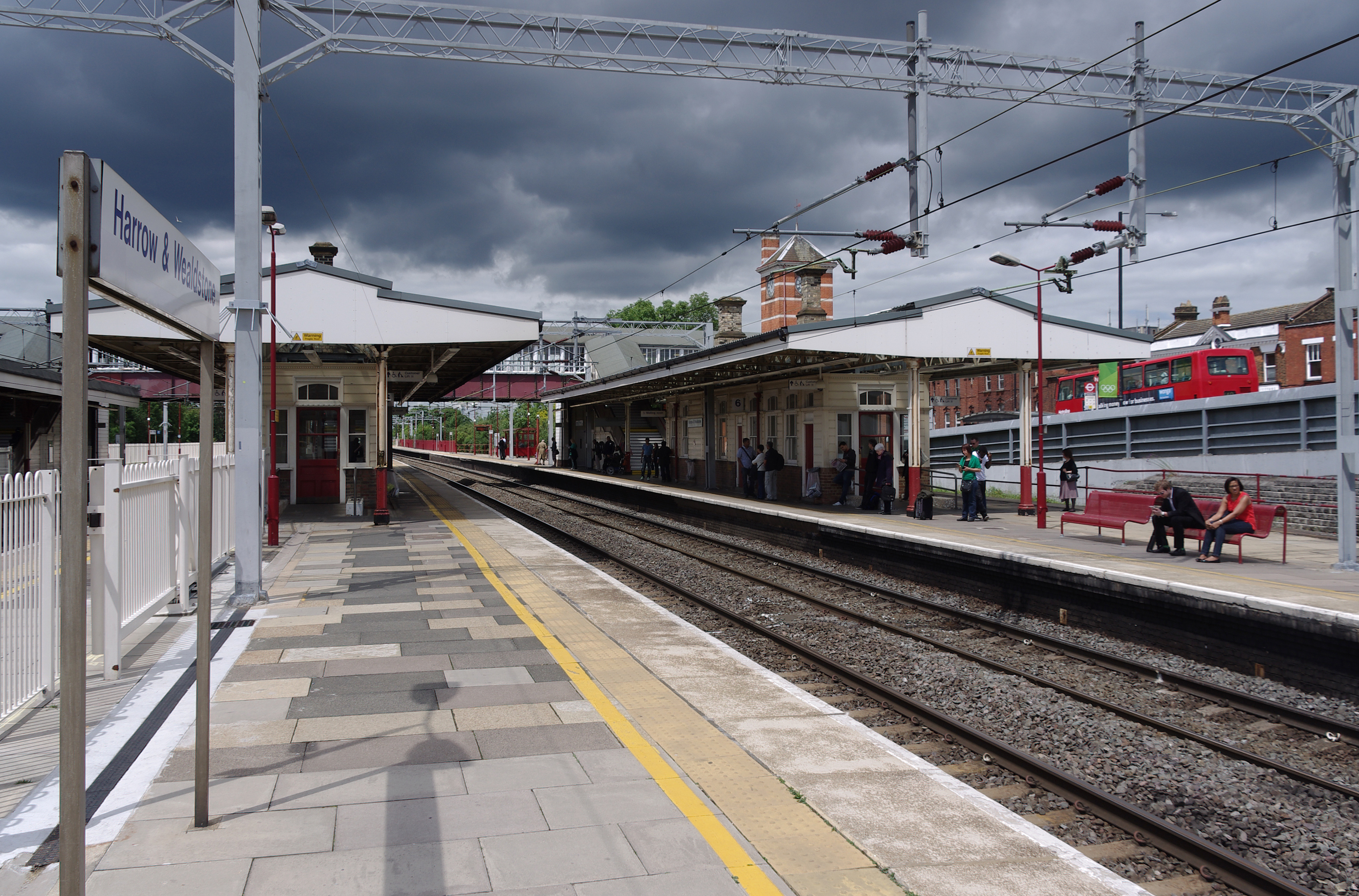
Main line platforms

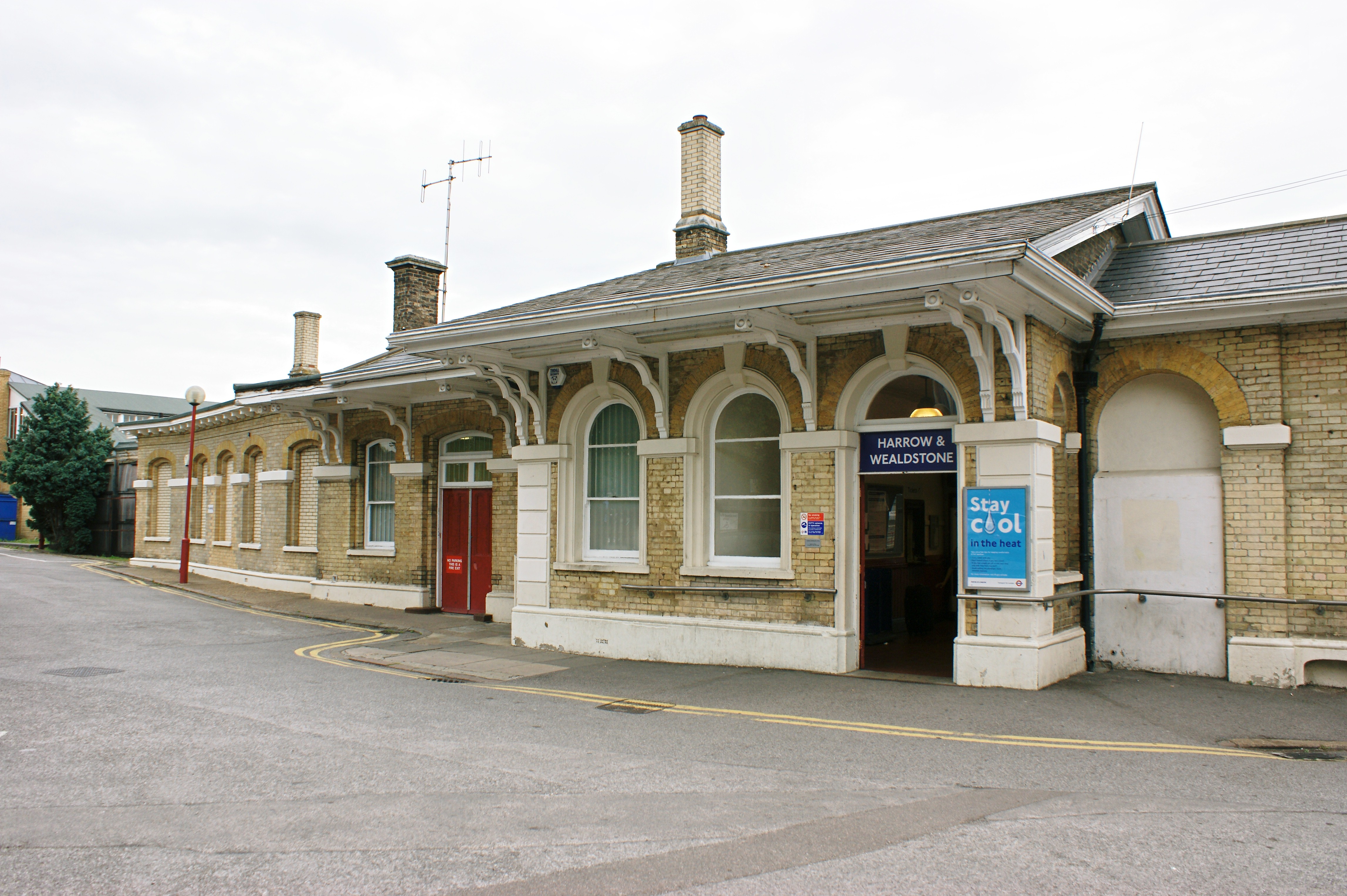
Entrance from Sandridge Close, part of the original station building

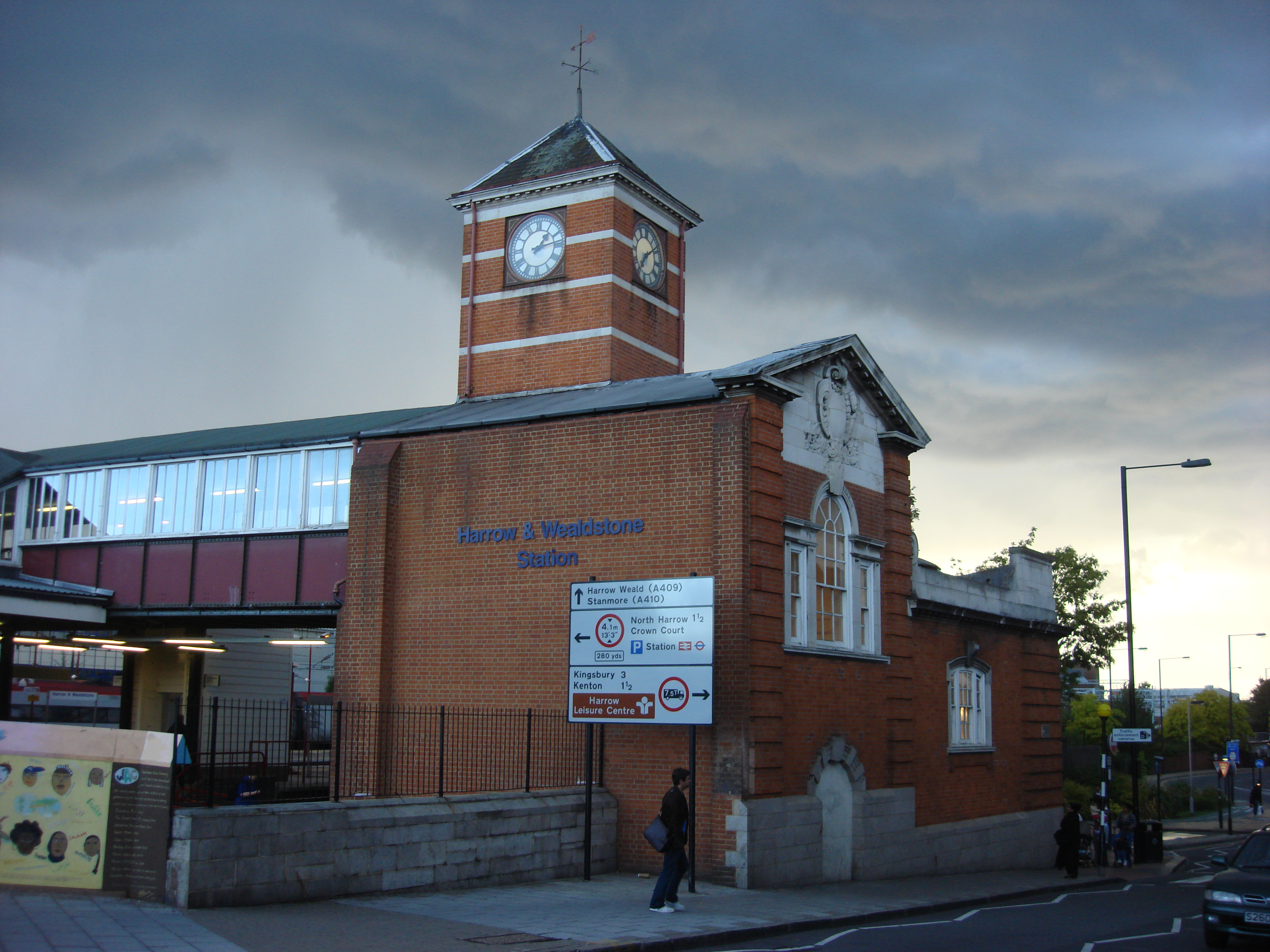
The station exterior clock as seen from The Bridge

The station has undergone several improvements in recent years: removal of the central barrier to allow use of the full width of the footbridge (which links both entrances and all platforms); new lifts for the use of disabled persons; newly painted and brightly-illuminated waiting rooms. When the line was resignalled with standard BR signalling in the 1980s, the two reversing sidings (used for turning Bakerloo line trains and occasionally DC line trains) located between the tracks of the DC line at the northern end side of the station were replaced by a single siding. This allowed the curve at the northern end of platform 2 to be eased using the space vacated by the removed siding. In practice, the remaining siding became unavailable for use by LO trains except when Bakerloo trains are not running as current (2018) service levels means that the siding is not sufficient for the reversing of Bakerloo trains, some trains have to reverse in platform 1 as well. Harrow and Wealdstone (together with Willesden Junction) is one of the two stations on the DC line which can be used for turning or stabling trains clear of the running lines during reduced or disrupted services although trains can be reversed using crossovers at other stations.

Ticket gatelines have been installed at both entrances in addition to the pre-existing booking offices

Trains on the fast lines pass the station through platforms 3 & 4, usually without stopping to serve it; access to these platforms is now by staff-operated gates which are opened when necessary. Southern and London Northwestern Railway stopping services generally use platforms 5 & 6 on the slow lines but all can use either pair of platforms when needed since the four main line platforms were lengthened to take 12-coach trains. Platform 2 on the Up DC line has unusually been maintained at a length of 182m rather than the usual DC line length of around 125m, long enough for an 8-coach train; on rare past occasions in recent years involving total closure of the fast and slow lines, main line trains have been diverted over the DC line between Watford Junction and Euston but without stopping at intermediate stations.

== Services ==
=== Main line services ===
Main line National Rail services at Harrow & Wealdstone are operated by London Northwestern Railway and Southern.

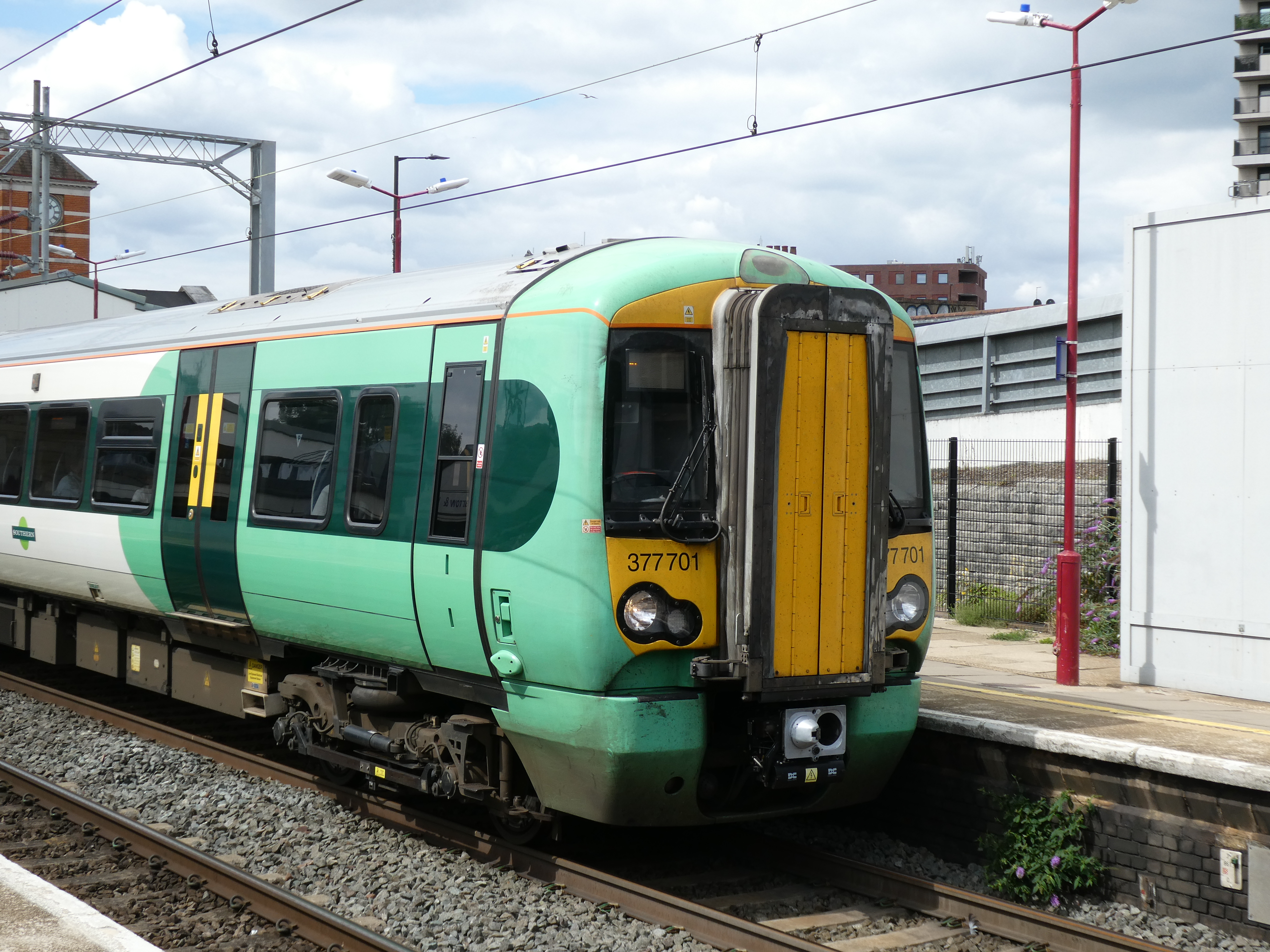
Southern Class 377 Electrostar at the Harrow & Wealdstone Station

The typical off-peak service in trains per hour is:

- 4 tph to London Euston (non-stop)
- 1 tph to East Croydon via Kensington (Olympia)
- 1 tph to Watford Junction
- 2 tph to Tring (semi-fast)
- 2 tph to Milton Keynes Central (stopping)

On Sundays, the semi-fast services between London Euston and Tring do not run and the service to East Croydon runs only as far as Clapham Junction.

=== Local services ===
Local services at Harrow & Wealdstone are operated by Lioness line of the London Overground and Bakerloo line of the London Underground.

The typical off-peak service in trains per hour is:

- 4 tph to London Euston (all stations)
- 4 tph to Elephant & Castle (all stations)
- 4 tph to Watford Junction (all stations)

Preceding station	London Overground	Following station
Headstone Lane towards Watford Junction	Lioness line Watford DC line	Kenton towards Euston
Preceding station	London Underground	Following station
Terminus	Bakerloo line	Kenton towards Elephant & Castle
Preceding station	National Rail	Following station
Bushey towards Milton Keynes Central	London Northwestern Railway London–Milton Keynes	London Euston Terminus
Watford Junction towards Tring	London Northwestern Railway London–Milton Keynes	London Euston Terminus
Watford Junction	Southern West London Line	Wembley Central
Former services
Headstone Lane towards Watford Junction	Bakerloo line (1917–1982)	Kenton towards Elephant & Castle
Historical railways
Hatch End	London and North Western Railway West Coast Main Line	Wembley Central
Willesden	London and Birmingham Railway	Watford old station
Disused railways
Terminus	British Railways Stanmore Branch Line	Belmont

== Future proposals ==
=== Crossrail ===
Network Rail's July 2011 London & South East Route Utilisation Strategy (RUS) recommended diverting West Coast Main Line (WCML) services from stations between London and Milton Keynes Central away from Euston, to Crossrail via Old Oak Common, to free up capacity at Euston for High Speed 2. This would provide a direct service from the WCML to the Shenfield, Canary Wharf and Abbey Wood, release London Underground capacity at Euston, make better use of Crossrail's capacity west of Paddington, and improve access to Heathrow Airport from the north. Under this scheme, all Crossrail trains would continue west of Paddington, instead of some of them terminating there. They would serve Heathrow Airport (10 tph), stations to Maidenhead and Reading (6 tph), and stations to Milton Keynes Central (8 tph).

In August 2014, a statement by the transport secretary Patrick McLoughlin indicated that the government was actively evaluating the extension of Crossrail as far as Tring, with potential Crossrail stops at Harrow & Wealdstone, Watford Junction, Hemel Hempstead, Berkhamsted and Tring. The extension would relieve some pressure from London Underground and London Euston station while also increasing connectivity. Conditions to the extension are that any extra services would not affect the planned service pattern for confirmed routes, as well as affordability.

== Access and connections ==
The TfL Getting Around map shows this station as having disabled access (platform 1 does not involve the use of a lift when entering/leaving the Harrow entrance nor does platform 6 using the Wealdstone entrance).

The station is at the southern end of Wealdstone High Street; it is a short distance from Harrow Civic Centre and less than a mile from Harrow town centre. The station serves these areas as well as Belmont and Harrow Weald, both of which lack stations of their own, and parts of Headstone and Kenton. London Buses routes 140, 182, 186, 258, 340, 640, H9, H10, and night routes N18 and N140 serve the station.
