= Belmont railway station (Harrow) =

Disused railway station in Belmont, Harrow

Belmont
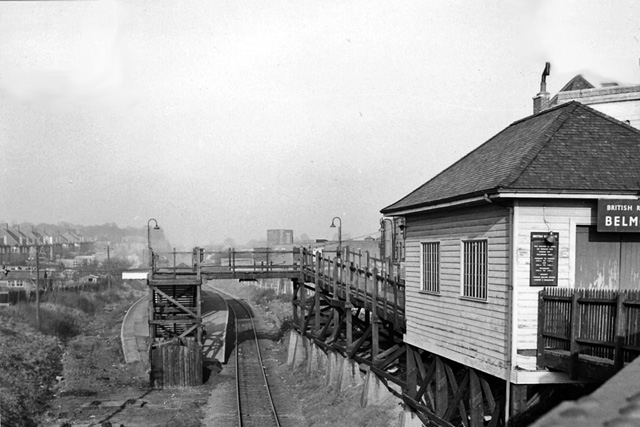
- Belmont railway station in 1961
- Interactive map of Belmont

General information
- Location: Belmont
- Owner: London, Midland and Scottish Railway
- Number of platforms: 2

Key dates
- 12 September 1932: Opened (LM&SR)
- 5 October 1964: Closed (BR)
- Replaced by: none

Other information
- Coordinates: 51.60169°N 0.31876°W

Belmont was a station in Belmont, Middlesex on the Stanmore branch line. It was opened on 12 September 1932 by the London, Midland and Scottish Railway as the only intermediate station on a short branch line (opened in 1890) running north from Harrow & Wealdstone to Stanmore, in anticipation of the Metropolitan Railway opening its own branch line to a new Stanmore station (now served by the Jubilee line) the same year.

Belmont station was rebuilt with a central island platform and a passing loop. The rebuilt station opened on 5 July 1937. The station was located on the north side of Kenton Lane to the west of Belmont Circle.

From the perspective of the branch line, the connection to the main line was north-facing, i.e. away from central London. Hence the branch line could not take direct commuter services from the city, limiting its operation to a shuttle service.

The direct service provided by the Metropolitan offered strong competition to the L&NWR station at Stanmore and passenger services beyond Belmont were ended on 15 September 1952, though a daily freight train served the goods yard at Stanmore. The passing loop was removed in 1955. The line to Stanmore was closed completely on 6 July 1964, as part of the railway cuts implemented under the Beeching Axe. Passenger services from Belmont to Harrow were withdrawn on 5 October 1964.

The track was lifted in 1966 and the station site is now occupied by a car park.

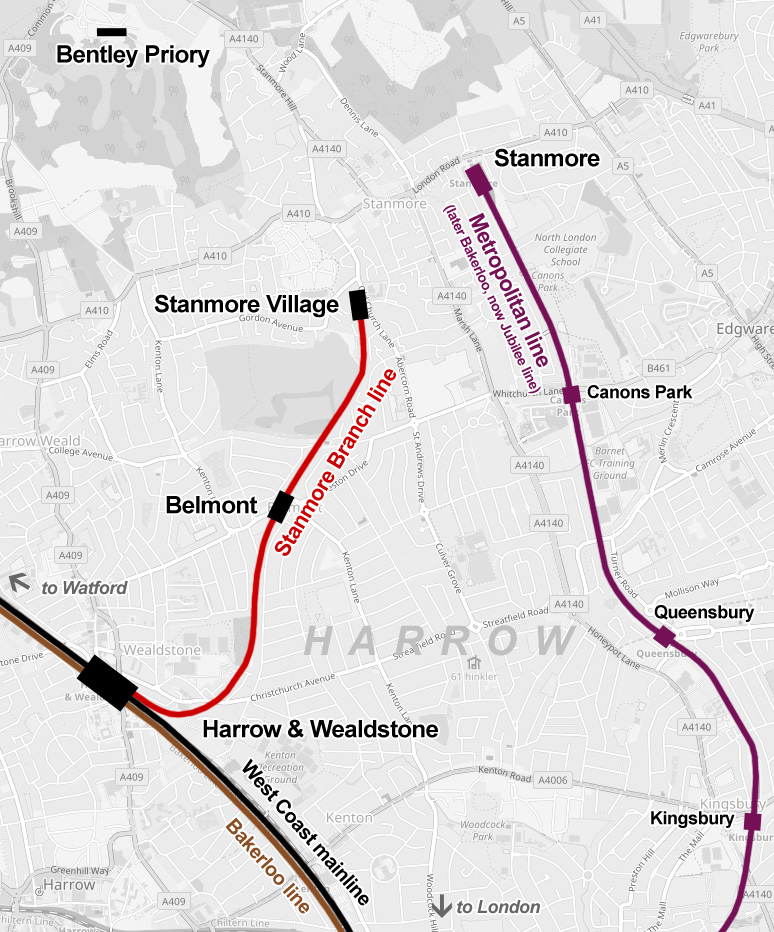

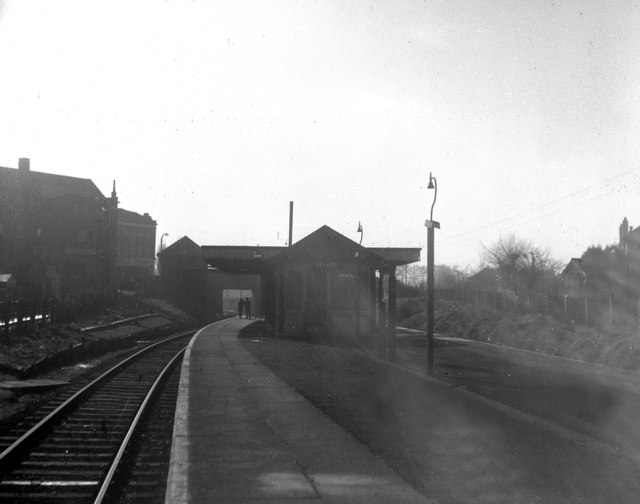
Belmont railway station in 1957

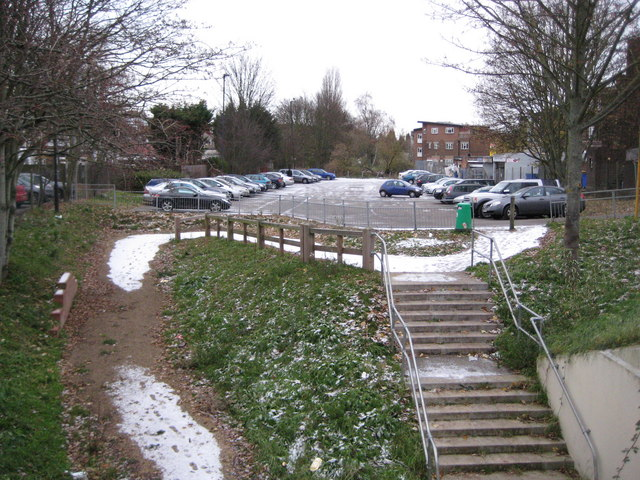
The site of the former station today

== See also ==
- List of closed railway stations in London
- List of closed railway stations in Britain
- Closed London Underground stations

Preceding station	Disused railways	Following station
Harrow & Wealdstone; Line closed, station open	British Railways; Stanmore branch line	Stanmore Village; Line and station closed
