= Great Hallingbury =

Village in England

Coordinates: 51°50′N 0°11′E

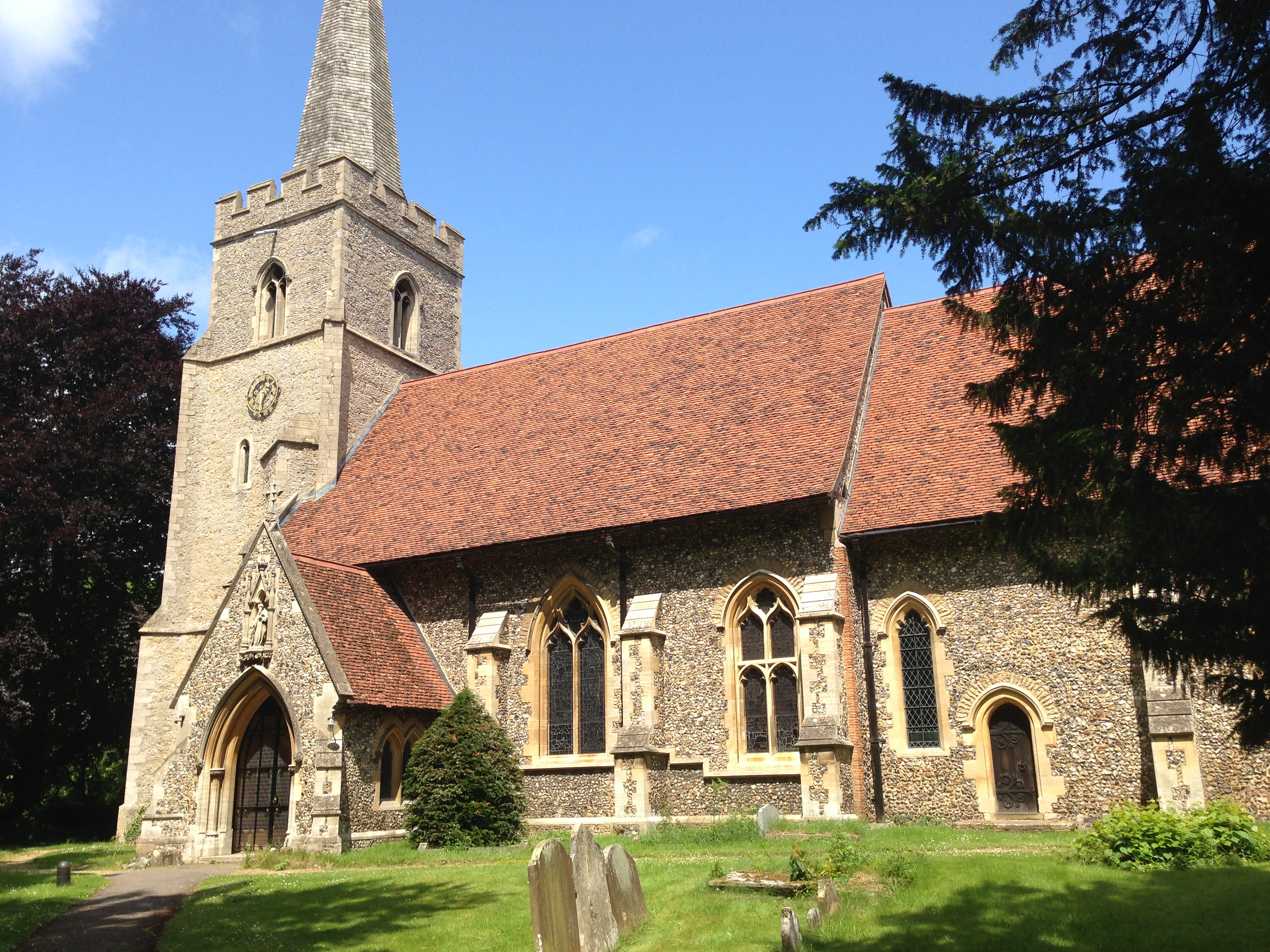
- St Giles church

- Location within Essex
- Population: 803 (Parish, 2021)
- Civil parish: Great Hallingbury
- District: Uttlesford
- Shire county: Essex
- Region: East
- Country: England
- Sovereign state: United Kingdom
- Post town: BISHOP'S STORTFORD
- Postcode district: CM22
- Dialling code: 01279
- Police: Essex
- Fire: Essex
- Ambulance: East of England

Great Hallingbury is a village and civil parish in the Uttlesford district of Essex, England. The village lies 2 miles (3 km) south-east of the centre of Bishop's Stortford, its post town, which is over the county boundary in Hertfordshire. As well as the village itself, the parish also includes the hamlets of Bedlar's Green, Hallingbury Street, Howe Green, Start Hill, Tilekiln Green and Woodside Green. At the 2021 census the parish had a population of 803.

Great Hallingbury contains houses from the Tudor period to modern. Decrease in population has resulted in the closure of the village school; its building and its accompanying playing field still exist, but are converted to housing and a grazing field.

Great Hallingbury has a church dedicated to St Giles.

William Parker, 4th Baron Monteagle, best known for his role in the discovery of the Gunpowder Plot, died in the village on 1 July 1622.

At the edge of the village is the ancient Royal Hunting Forest and National Trust property Hatfield Forest. On 22 December 1999, Korean Air Cargo Flight 8509 crashed into the Forest near Great Hallingbury shortly after takeoff from nearby London Stansted Airport, killing all four crew members on board.

The M11 motorway passes through the parish to the west of the village.

== See also ==
- The Hundred Parishes
