= Belmont, Harrow =

Area of London, England

Coordinates: 51.60130°N 0.31929°W

Belmont
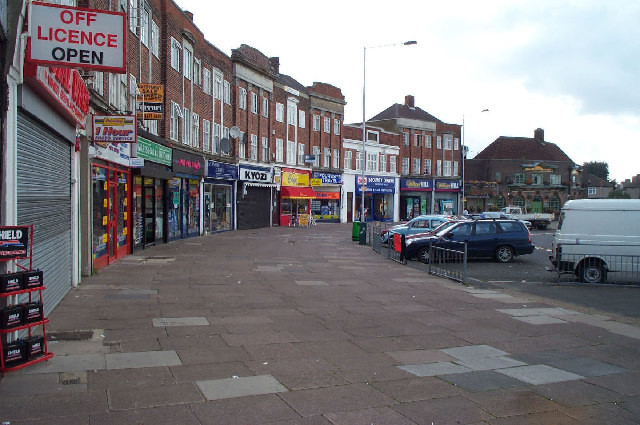
- Belmont Circle

- Ventnor Avenue is one of the tree-lined streets in mostly low-rise residential Belmont.

- Location within Greater London
- Population: 11,343 (2011 Census. Ward)
- OS grid reference: TQ165905
- London borough: Harrow
- Ceremonial county: Greater London
- Region: London
- Country: England
- Sovereign state: United Kingdom
- Post town: HARROW
- Postcode district: HA3
- Post town: STANMORE
- Postcode district: HA7
- Dialling code: 020
- Police: Metropolitan
- Fire: London
- Ambulance: London
- UK Parliament: Harrow East
- London Assembly: Brent and Harrow

Belmont is a suburban residential area of the London Borough of Harrow, located between Stanmore, Kenton, Wealdstone and Queensbury.

== Etymology ==
The area is named after the mound constructed in the early 18th century by Henry James Brydges, Earl of Carnarvon and first Duke of Chandos. He had a summer house built atop the mound for the wonderful view. The mound, or mount, is now the Stanmore Golf Course.

== Amenities ==
Belmont Circle provides the main focus of the area, being a large, circular parade of that intersects Kenton Lane. Many of the outlets are now food-related, along with several bars. Belmont Community Hall hosts local activities, events and a regular jumble sale.

== Demography ==
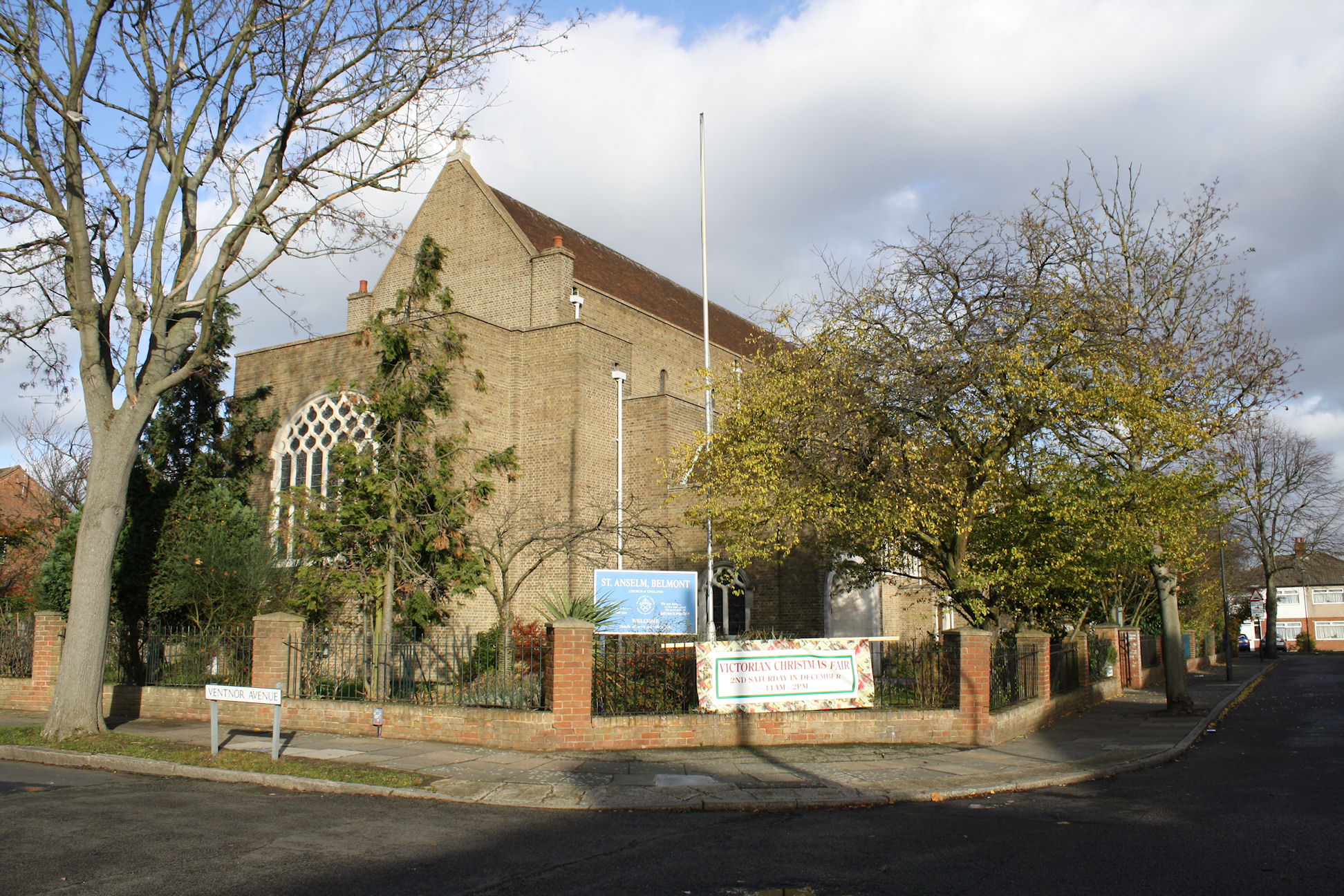
St Anselm's church, Belmont

In the 2011 census, the largest ethnic group in Belmont ward was Indian (34%), followed by White British (30%). Religion wise, 34% of residents adhered to Christianity, 30% to Hinduism, 11% to Islam, 8% to Judaism, 4% to Jainism and 6% were not religious.

== Governance ==
Belmont is part of the Harrow East constituency for elections to the House of Commons of the United Kingdom.

Belmont is part of the Belmont ward for elections to Harrow London Borough Council.

== Transport ==
Both Harrow & Wealdstone station on London Overground's Lioness Line between Watford Junction and London Euston, and the Bakerloo Line which runs between Harrow & Wealdstone and Elephant & Castle and Canons Park tube station, on the Jubilee Line, are easily accessible nearby.

London Bus routes 186, H18 and H19 serve the area.

Belmont was formerly served by Belmont railway station, on a single-line branch running between Harrow & Wealdstone and Stanmore Village; it was known locally as "The Rattler". The site of the station is now a car park; what may remain of the platform and track lies beneath tons of earth and rubble used to bring the car park up to street level. The Belmont Trail is a rail trail between Wealdstone and Stanmore running along much of the original track route. The circle was originally made for a tram line that would go across London.

Extract from OS Map, 6-inches-to the mile (1868-1883). Click for wider map. The shading is for the today faintly traceable land holding and then house known as Belmont Park (the heart of which is today's Stanmore Golf Course), with darker shading for its trees. Watery Lane lay between it and Belmont Terrace, an isolated cluster of houses to the east.
