= Stanmore branch line =

Abandoned railway in the UK

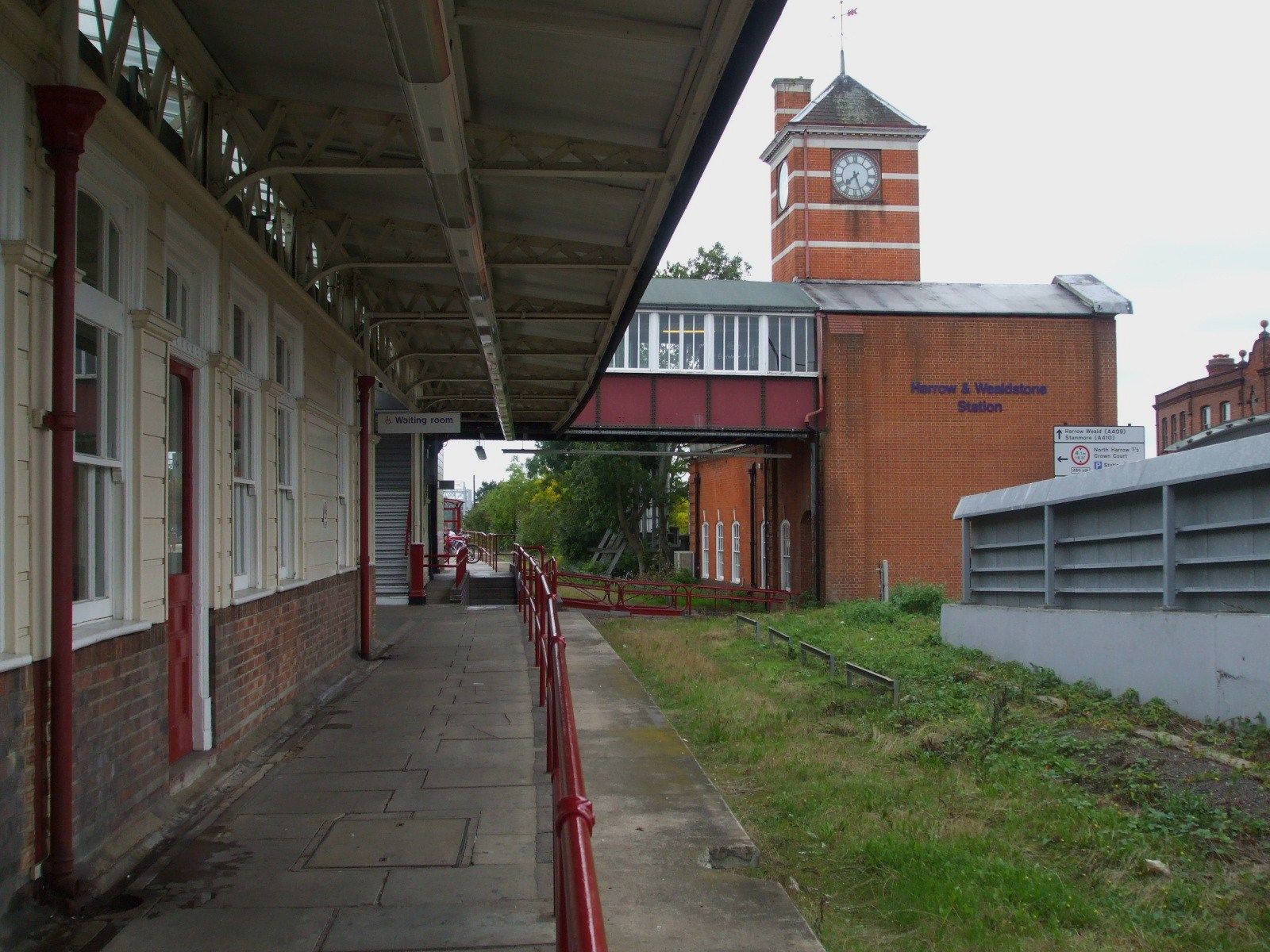
- The former Stanmore branch line platform at Harrow & Wealdstone

Overview
- Status: Dismantled, re-purposed as cycle track
- Owner: Fredrick Gordon (until 1899)
- Locale: Harrow, London, England, UK
- Coordinates: 51.60169°N 0.31876°W
- Termini: Harrow & Wealdstone; Stanmore Village
- Stations: 3

Service
- Type: Local rail
- System: National Rail
- Operator(s): LNWR (1890–1922); LMS (1923–1948); British Railways (1948-1964)
- Rolling stock: LMS Fowler 2-6-2T; British Rail Class 103; British Rail railbuses

History
- Opened: 1890
- Closed: 1964

Technical
- Line length: 2.12 miles (3.41 km)
- Track gauge: 1,435 mm (4 ft 8 1/2 in)
Route map
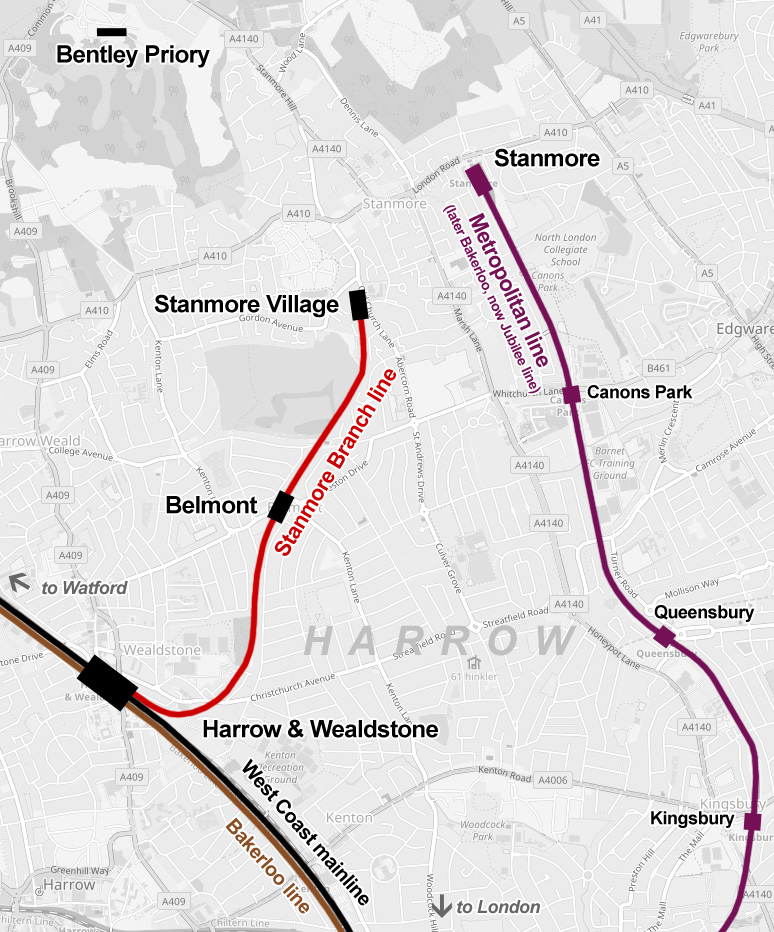

The Stanmore branch line was a railway line in Harrow, Middlesex (now Greater London), in the United Kingdom. Located to the north of London, it provided commuter rail services between Harrow and the village of Stanmore. Beginning at Harrow station (now called Harrow & Wealdstone), the line split off from the West Coast Main Line and followed a short 2.12-mile (3.41 km) route to Stanmore.

The branch had two stations on the line, Stanmore Village and Belmont (opened later). It was built and promoted by the Harrow and Stanmore Railway, a company owned by local hotel owner Frederick Gordon, and operated by the London and North Western Railway company (LNWR).

The line was closed in 1964 during the Beeching axe and today the route only exists as a rail trail footpath and cycle route. The empty platform for the branch line is still visible today at Harrow and Wealdstone station.

== History ==
=== Construction ===
In 1882 the entrepreneur and hotelier Frederick Gordon purchased Bentley Priory, a large country house near the rural village of Stanmore. He planned to open it up as a country retreat for wealthy guests. Known as "The Napoleon of the Hotel World", Gordon was a successful international businessman, and had earned his millions through companies such as Ashanti Goldfields, Apollinaris and Johannis, Pears soap and Bovril. The location of Bentley Priory suffered from a lack of transport connections, and Gordon was not content to ferry his paying guests by horse-drawn stagecoach from London.

Harrow and Stanmore Railway Act 1886
- Act of Parliament
- Parliament of the United Kingdom
- Long title: An Act for authorising the construction of a Railway between Harrow and Stanmore, in the County of Middlesex, to be called the Harrow and Stanmore Railway; and for other purposes.
- Citation: 49 & 50 Vict. c. cviii

Dates
- Royal assent: 25 June 1886

Text of statute as originally enacted

In order to make his resort more appealing to affluent clientele, he proposed the construction of a short railway line from nearby Harrow. Gordon struggled to raise the necessary capital to build the line, and funded most of its construction himself. He successfully negotiated a contract with the LNWR, the railway company that owned the mainline at Harrow, to operate the Stanmore line on his behalf. The line was authorised by the Harrow and Stanmore Railway Act 1886 (49 & 50 Vict. c. cviii)

Harrow and Stanmore Railway Act 1888
- Act of Parliament
- Parliament of the United Kingdom
- Long title: An Act to authorise the Harrow and Stanmore Railway Company to deviate a portion of their authorised Railway; and for other purposes.
- Citation: 51 & 52 Vict. c. xxxiv

Dates
- Royal assent: 28 June 1888

Text of statute as originally enacted

Gordon's scheme met with some local opposition and he was forced to re-route the railway line further east to mitigate objections, which was authorised by the Harrow and Stanmore Railway Act 1888 (51 & 52 Vict. c. xxxiv). The site for a terminus was selected in Old Church Lane in Stanmore. To allay the concerns of the local inhabitants — and to appeal to his well-heeled customers — Gordon commissioned an architect to design an elegant station building that resembled a Gothic-style English country church. After receiving parliamentary approval, Gordon began building work in July 1889.

The Stanmore branch line opened to great fanfare on 18 December 1890, turning Harrow into a junction station. The line terminated at Harrow in a bay platform on the north side of the station, adjacent to the London-bound platforms. From the outset, the line was staffed and operated by the LNWR, and after the first year the LNWR took over maintenance and repair of the line as well. Initially, train service patterns between Harrow and Stanmore were arranged to suit an upper-class leisure market; trains began running mid-morning and would end in the early evening, making the service unsuitable for ordinary workers.

Meanwhile, Gordon's business ambitions expanded; in Stanmore village he purchased land near the station and laid out a wide avenue — named Gordon Avenue — lined with new superior houses, in the hope of attracting wealthy Londoners to come to live in the country and commute into the city on his new railway. Despite the enormity of his efforts, Gordon's Stanmore ventures were not particularly successful. Neither the Bentley Priory Hotel nor the railway were commercially successful, and in 1899 he wound up the Harrow and Stanmore Railway and sold it outright to the LNWR for £35,000.

=== Competition ===
In the early years of the 20th century as the population of London grew, Stanmore was affected by increasing urbanisation and the small rural village was rapidly becoming a suburb of London. The London, Midland and Scottish Railway (LMS, the successor to the LNWR) was faced with competition from rival railway companies and from the growing number of motor bus services. In an attempt to attract more passengers, the company opened a new intermediate station at Belmont in September 1932, and it also introduced diesel railcars onto the route and began to run Sunday services. The increase in services and the opening of Belmont heralded a change in character of the branch line; while Gordon's original plan was to appeal to a leisure market, the branch line had now become a transport service for people with jobs. The new station attracted more working-class people to the line, and this was evidenced at Harrow & Wealdstone station with the introduction of gender and class-segregated waiting rooms for ladies, gentlemen and general passengers.

In December 1932 the Metropolitan Railway (MR) opened a new electrified, double-track line from Wembley Park to Stanmore (now part of the Jubilee line). This provided Stanmore commuters with a more rapid and easier journey into central London without the need to change trains at Harrow. The LMS's slow, single-track Stanmore–Harrow branch line could not offer through services to London, as the junction with the main line at Harrow faced north, away from London and on the opposite side of the main line to the suburban Watford new line.

=== Decline and closure ===
Despite coal shortages during World War II, the Stanmore branch line continued to operate throughout the war. After 1948, the Stanmore–Harrow line became part of British Railways (BR). To avoid confusion with the Bakerloo line station of the same name (now part of the Jubilee line), the Stanmore BR station was renamed Stanmore Village in 1950.

In 1952 passenger services to Stanmore were withdrawn and passenger trains terminated at Belmont, although the line was kept open for goods trains. In 1963 the branch line was earmarked for closure in Richard Beeching's report, The Reshaping of British Railways. Despite still attracting substantial passenger numbers on rush hour services, the Stanmore branch line was closed as part of the Beeching cuts; the goods line from Belmont to Stanmore was shut on 6 July 1964, and the last passenger train ran from Belmont to Harrow on 5 October 1964.

The railway tracks were taken up in 1966 and the remaining trackbed was purchased by Harrow Council. Sections of the former line were sold off and built upon, but most of the line was left to grow wild. Despite its architectural merit, Stanmore Village station was allowed to fall into ruin. Attempts were made to preserve the building, but it suffered from neglect and vandalism. In 1969 it was redeveloped by a property developer, who removed most of the Gothic architectural features and converted it into a residential property, which still stands today on Gordon Avenue.

=== The route today ===
Remnants of the Stanmore branch line can still be seen today. At Harrow and Wealdstone station, the platform that was once served by Stanmore trains still exists; a railing has been built along the platform edge for safety reasons. The adjacent track has been lifted and the old trackbed is covered in grass. A small paved path has been created to allow passengers to cross from platform 6 to the ticket hall without having to mount the footbridge.

After a local campaign in Stanmore, a scheme was launched in partnership with the London Wildlife Trust to re-open part of the old Stanmore branch line as a rail trail. Known as the Belmont Trail, the route is a pedestrian and cycle route along the old trackbed.

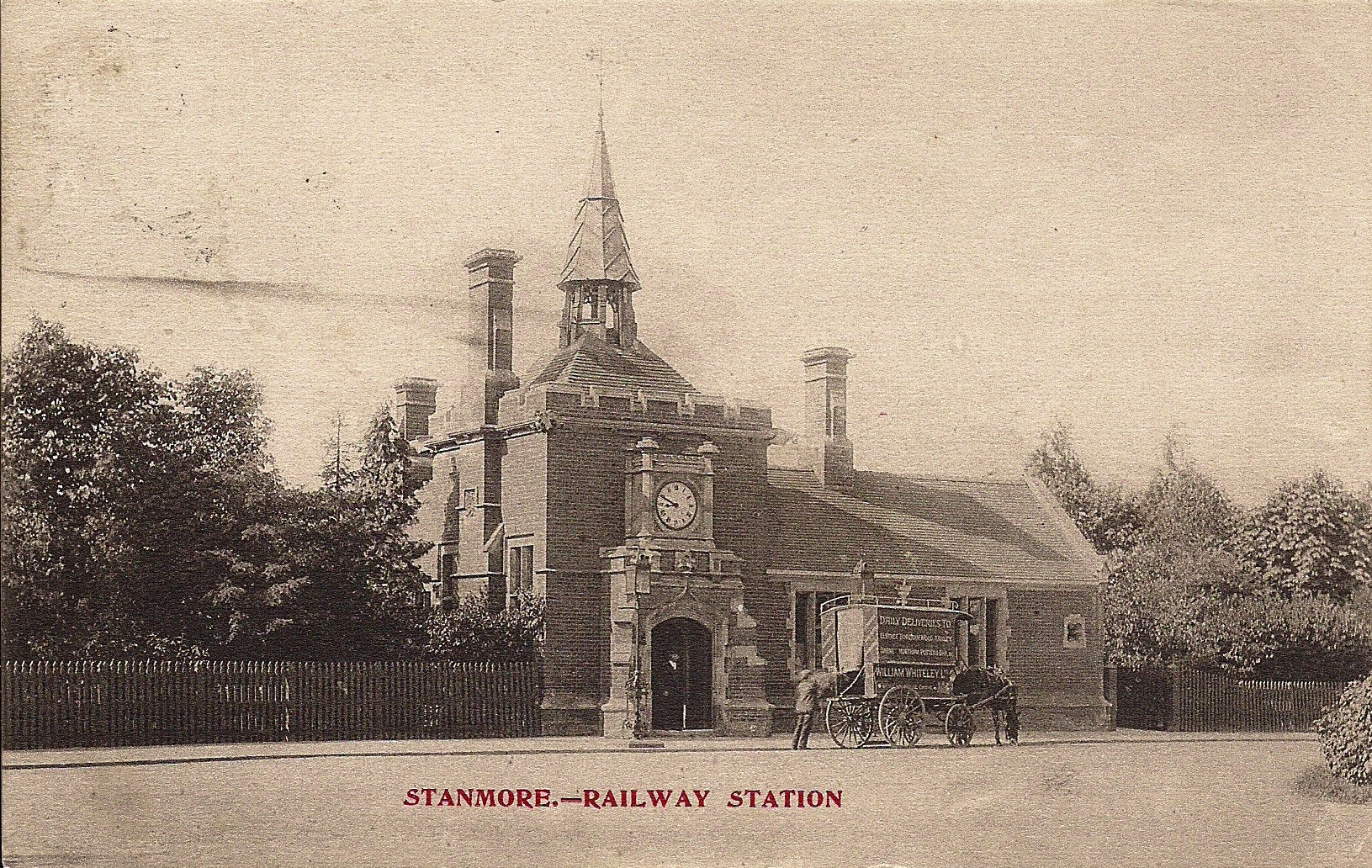
The ornate Stanmore station (c.1905)

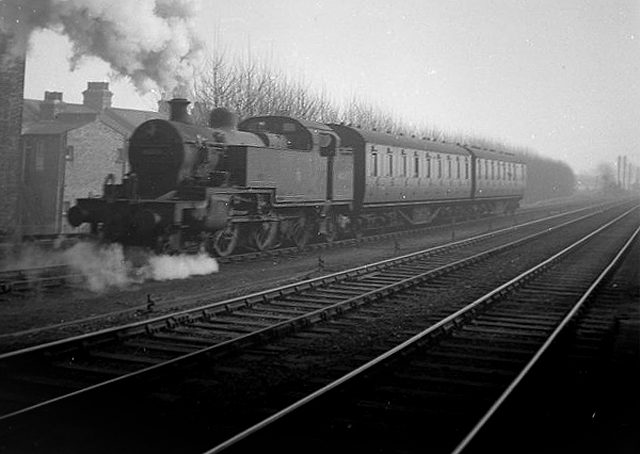
Harrow–Belmont train, c.1956

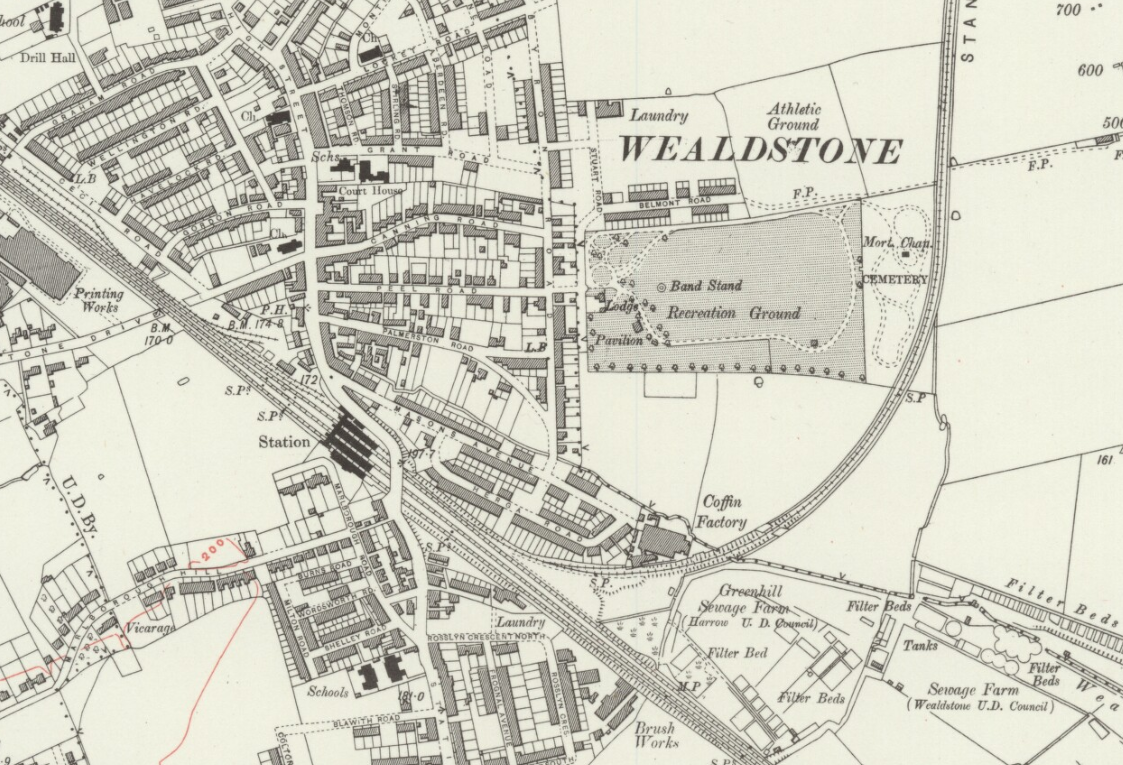
1916 map of Harrow & Wealdstone station showing the Stanmore branch

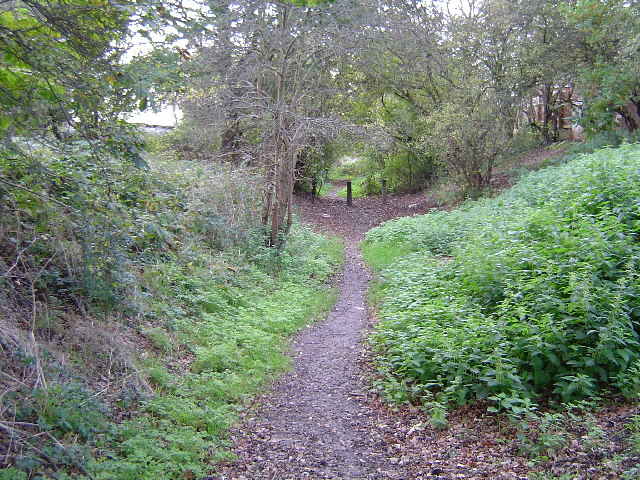
The Belmont Trail as it now appears

== See also ==
- The Watford and Rickmansworth Railway, 5.5 miles (8.9 km) from Harrow & Wealdstone (closed 1996)
- Nickey line, a closed line that ran from Boxmoor, about 12.25 miles (19.71 km) further up the line from Harrow and Wealdstone
- List of rail trails
- List of closed railway stations in London
- List of closed railway stations in Britain
- Metro-land
