= Bealbury =

Hamlet in Cornwall, England

Coordinates: 50.47°N 04.29°W

Bealbury: Cornish: Dinbel
- Location within Cornwall
- OS grid reference: SX3766
- Shire county: Cornwall
- Region: South West
- Country: England
- Sovereign state: United Kingdom
- Post town: Saltash
- Postcode district: PL12 6
- Police: Devon and Cornwall
- Fire: Cornwall
- Ambulance: South Western

Bealbury (Cornish: Dinbel, meaning Fort of Bel, an Anglo-Saxon name) is a hamlet in St Mellion civil parish in east Cornwall, England, United Kingdom. It is two miles south of Callington.
