= Belnie =

Hamlet in the civil parish of Gosberton, Lincolnshire, England

Coordinates: 52.860°N 00.145°W

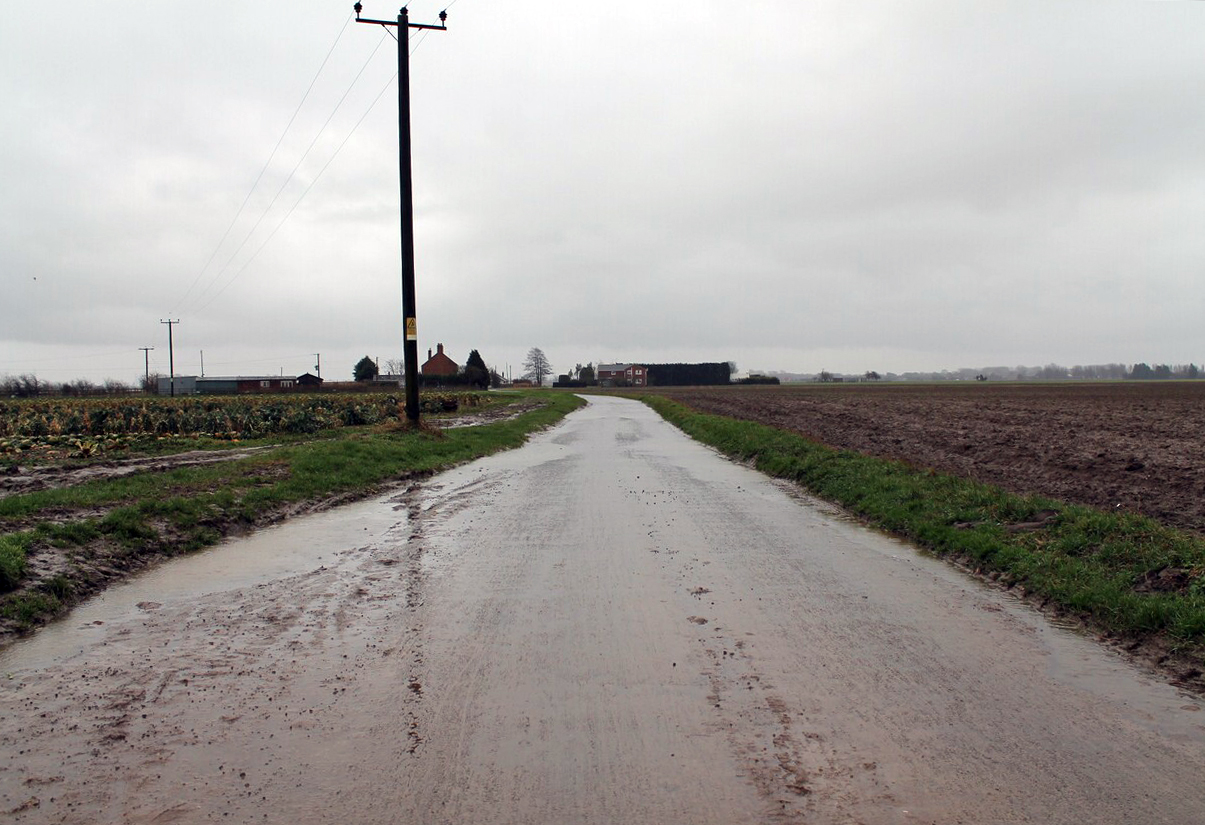
- Belnie lane

- Location within Lincolnshire
- OS grid reference: TF2530
  - London: 90 mi (140 km) S
- Shire county: Lincolnshire
- Region: East Midlands
- Country: England
- Sovereign state: United Kingdom
- Postcode district: PE11
- Police: Lincolnshire
- Fire: Lincolnshire
- Ambulance: East Midlands

Belnie is a hamlet in the civil parish of Gosberton, Lincolnshire, England.
