= Bellmount =

Village in Norfolk, England

Coordinates: 52.76°N 00.28°E

- Location within Norfolk
- OS grid reference: TF5421
- Shire county: Norfolk
- Region: East
- Country: England
- Sovereign state: United Kingdom
- Police: Norfolk
- Fire: Norfolk
- Ambulance: East of England

Bellmount is a village in Norfolk, England.
