= Bedingham Green =

Hamlet in Norfolk, England

Coordinates: 52.483°N 01.370°E

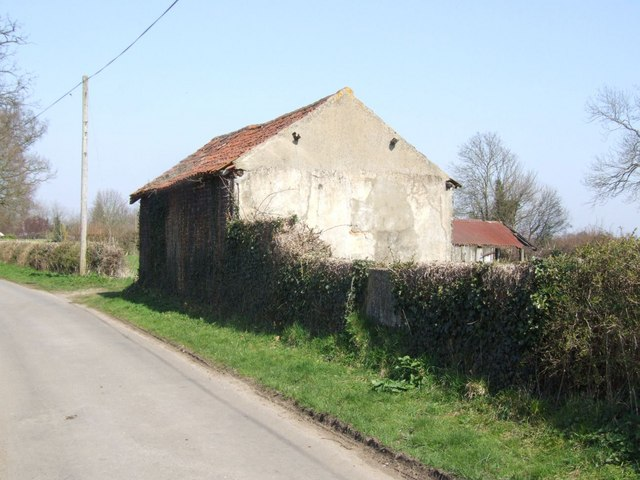
- Disused Farm Buildings on School Road

- Location within Norfolk
- OS grid reference: TM2892
- Shire county: Norfolk
- Region: East
- Country: England
- Sovereign state: United Kingdom
- Police: Norfolk
- Fire: Norfolk
- Ambulance: East of England

Bedingham Green is a hamlet in Norfolk, England.
