= Bealsmill =

Hamlet in Cornwall, England

Coordinates: 50.56803°N 4.31969°W

Bealsmill: Cornish: Melin Bel
- Location within Cornwall
- OS grid reference: SX358769
- Shire county: Cornwall
- Region: South West
- Country: England
- Sovereign state: United Kingdom
- Police: Devon and Cornwall
- Fire: Cornwall
- Ambulance: South Western

Bealsmill (Cornish: Melin Bel, meaning Mill of Bel, an Anglo-Saxon name) is a hamlet in east Cornwall, UK. It is in the valley of the River Inny and is five miles (8 km) south-southeast of Launceston. It is in the civil parish of Stoke Climsland.
