= Beacon End =

Village in Essex, England

Coordinates: 51.885°N 00.840°E

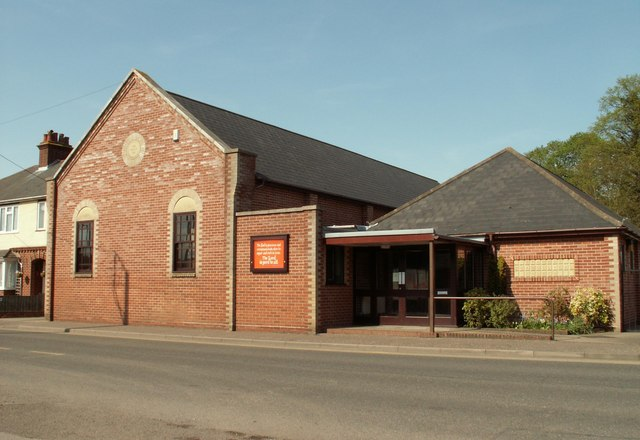
- Stanway Evangelical Church

- Location within Essex
- OS grid reference: TL9524
- District: Colchester
- Shire county: Essex
- Region: East
- Country: England
- Sovereign state: United Kingdom
- Police: Essex
- Fire: Essex
- Ambulance: East of England

Beacon End is a village in the city of Colchester in Essex, England. It is located between Lexden and Stanway.
