= Beck Foot =

Village in Cumbria, England

Coordinates: 54.35°N 02.60°W

- Location in South Lakeland Location within Cumbria
- OS grid reference: SD6196
- Civil parish: Grayrigg
- Unitary authority: Westmorland and Furness
- Ceremonial county: Cumbria
- Region: North West
- Country: England
- Sovereign state: United Kingdom
- Post town: KENDAL
- Postcode district: LA8
- Dialling code: 01539
- Police: Cumbria
- Fire: Cumbria
- Ambulance: North West
- UK Parliament: Westmorland and Lonsdale

Beck Foot is a hamlet in Cumbria, England, situated on the B6257 road south of Lowgill, the West Coast Main Line and M6 motorway. The disused Lowgill Viaduct is close by.

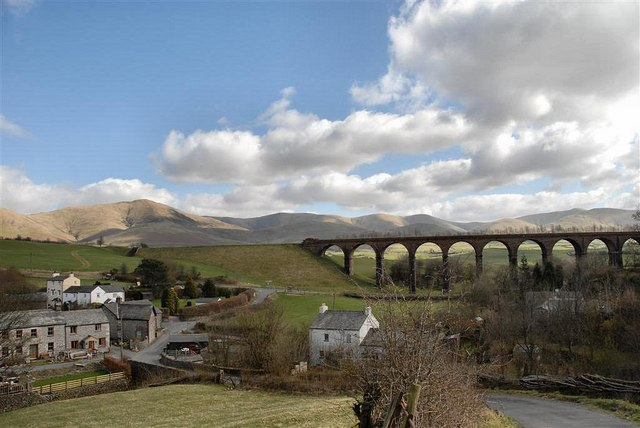
Beck Foot and the Lowgill viaduct
