= 1838 Harrow rail accident =

Railway accident in 1838

Coordinates: 51.5820°N 0.3541°W

Harrow train accident

Details
- Date: 7 August 1838
- Location: near Harrow, Middlesex, England
- Operator: London and Birmingham Railway
- Incident type: fall from a train

Statistics
- Deaths: 1

The Harrow train accident 1838 occurred on the afternoon of Tuesday 7 August 1838. Thomas Port, a railway guard, fell from a train on the London and Birmingham Railway near to Harrow, Middlesex, England. He was dragged under the carriages and had both legs partially severed. Despite attempts to save his life, he died later that day from severe blood loss.

== Historical background ==
The first part of the London to Birmingham Railway opened between Euston Station and Hemel Hempstead on 20 July 1837, and then on to Bletchley in time for Queen Victoria's coronation on 28 June 1838. The whole railway was officially fully opened on 17 September 1838.

== Description of the accident ==
Thomas Port was employed as a guard by the London and Birmingham Railway.

At that time train operation was still largely based upon the standards of British stagecoach practice and Port's normal travelling location aboard the train was in an outside seat at roof level. It was part of his duty to undertake ticket checks to make sure second class passengers were not sitting in first class carriages. This task required that once the train was underway he would climb down to move along the step boards on the outside of the carriages so he could check the tickets through the door windows.

On the day of his death, 7 August 1838, the train had left Euston Station at 5pm. About 10 miles (16 km) from Euston and 1 1/4 miles (2 km) from Harrow the train was travelling at full speed, about 30 mph (50 km/h). As Port attempted to step from one carriage to the next, he slipped and fell under the train. His legs were run over, crushing and partially severing them.

One of the other guards saw the injured Port lying on the tracks in great pain, and indicated to the driver to stop the train immediately. Emergency first aid was given by two doctors who were travelling on the train and then Port was put back aboard and taken to Harrow. Here the doctors fully amputated both his legs in an attempt to cauterise the bleeding, but Port died from a severe loss of blood within 3 hours of the accident.

Thomas Port "left a father, a mother, several brothers and sisters, and a wife and two children to lament his loss."

== Coroner's inquisition ==
A "coroner's inquisition" was held the following Saturday.

It was reported that "the unfortunate deceased started with the Denbigh Hall (Note: In the referenced article in the Staffordshire Advertiser, the station at Bletchley was referred to as Denbigh Hall, a coaching inn that once stood on Watling Street, the main London to Holyhead coach route, and near to the station just outside Bletchley. At that time long distance stagecoach travellers would have referred to intermediate stopping points by the name of the coaching inns visited, rather than by town names.) five o-clock train on Tuesday last from the station at Euston grove, and having arrived within a mile and a quarter of Harrow, as was the usual custom, he dismounted from his seat for the purpose of collecting from the passengers what is termed the 'excess fares.' ... In the performance of this duty the deceased was engaged on Tuesday, which compelled him to pass from one carriage to the other by the steps, and when in the act of placing his foot on one of them, at the time the train was proceeding at upwards of thirty miles an hour, his foot slipped between the wheels, which as they successively passed over, dragged his legs in, crushing them inch by inch up to one of his knees and above the other."

The jury felt that it was dangerous to require a guard to perform such a duty while the train was travelling at full speed, but returned a verdict of Accidental Death.

== Gravestone ==
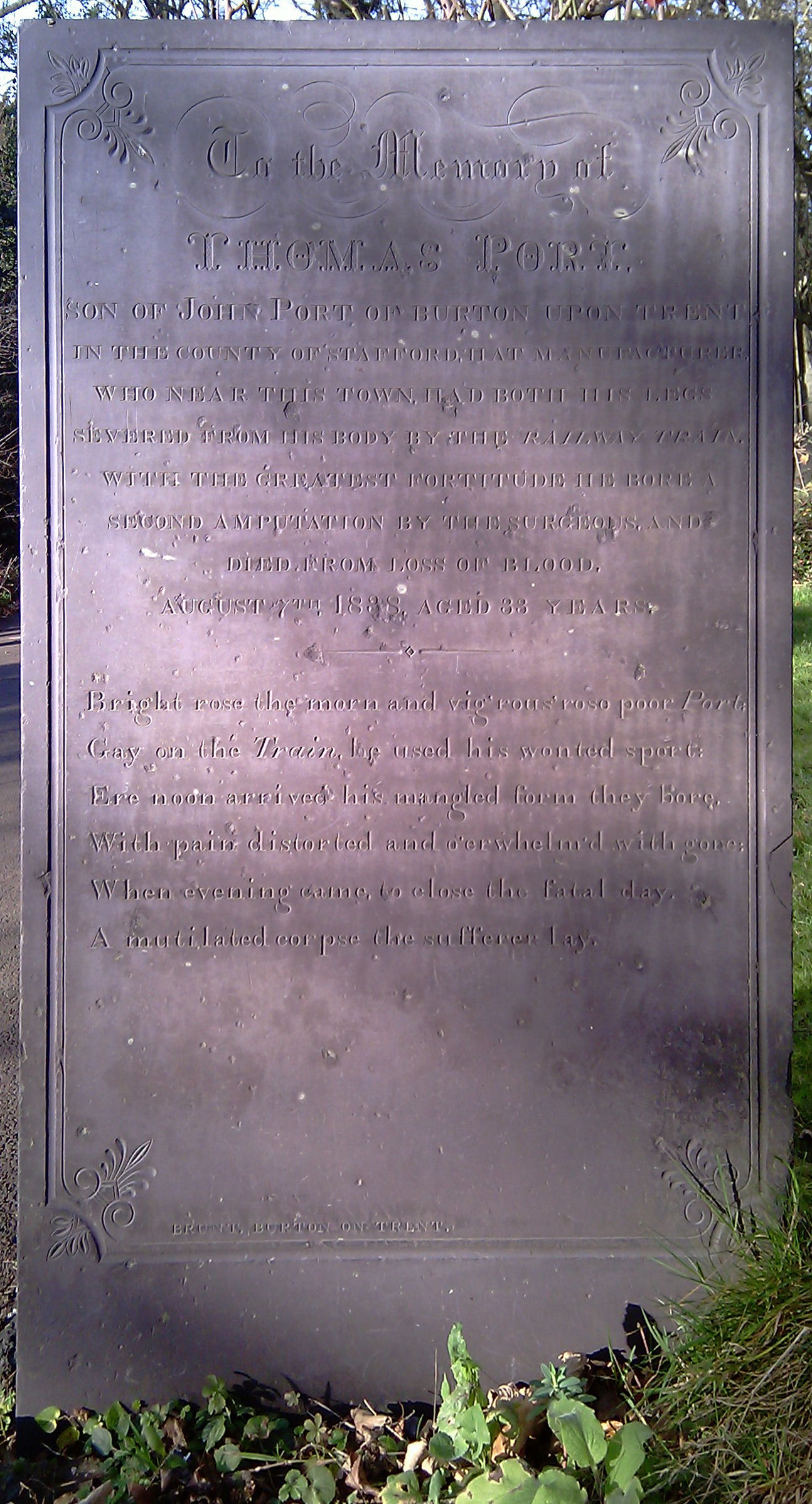
Thomas Port's gravestone in the graveyard of St Mary's Church, Harrow-on-the-Hill.

Thomas Port is buried in the churchyard of St Mary's Church, Harrow on the Hill. His gravestone has the following inscription:

TO THE MEMORY OF

THOMAS PORT

SON OF JOHN PORT OF BURTON UPON TRENT
IN THE COUNTY OF STAFFORD, HAT MANUFACTURER,
WHO NEAR THIS TOWN HAD BOTH HIS LEGS
SEVERED FROM HIS BODY BY THE RAILWAY TRAIN.
WITH THE GREATEST FORTITUDE HE BORE A
SECOND AMPUTATION BY THE SURGEONS, AND
DIED FROM LOSS OF BLOOD.
AUGUST 7TH 1838 AGED 33 YEARS.

Bright rose the morn and vig'rous' rose poor Port.
Gay on the Train he used his wonted sport:
Ere noon arrived his mangled form they bore,
With pain distorted and o'erwhelmed with gore:
When evening came to close the fatal day,
A mutilated corpse the sufferer lay.
