= Bedchester =

Hamlet in Dorset, England

Coordinates: 50.956°N 02.211°W

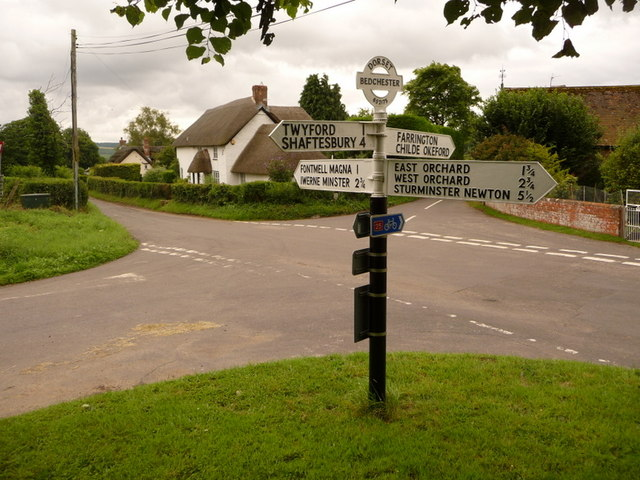
- Bedchester

- Location within Dorset
- OS grid reference: ST852175
- Civil parish: Fontmell Magna
- Unitary authority: Dorset
- Ceremonial county: Dorset
- Region: South West
- Country: England
- Sovereign state: United Kingdom
- Post town: SHAFTESBURY
- Postcode district: SP7
- Dialling code: 01747
- Police: Dorset
- Fire: Dorset and Wiltshire
- Ambulance: South Western
- UK Parliament: North Dorset

Bedchester is a hamlet in the civil parish of Fontmell Magna, in Dorset, England.

A sign for Bedchester can be briefly seen in The Only Fools and Horses episode, A Touch of Glass.
