= Beck Head =

Village in Cumbria, England

Coordinates: 54.24°N 02.86°W

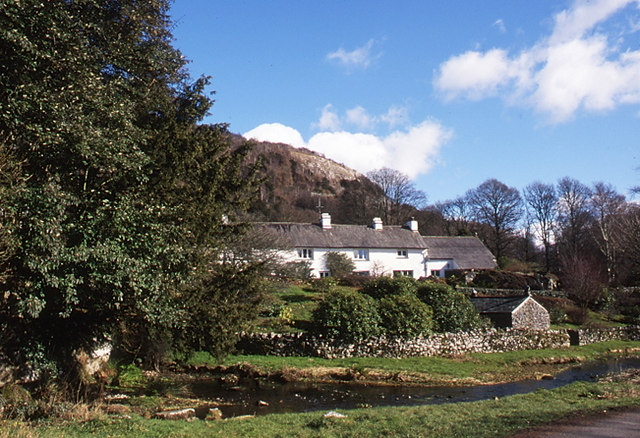
- Cottages at Beck Head

- Location in South Lakeland Location within Cumbria
- OS grid reference: SD4484
- Civil parish: Witherslack
- Unitary authority: Westmorland and Furness
- Ceremonial county: Cumbria
- Region: North West
- Country: England
- Sovereign state: United Kingdom
- Post town: GRANGE-OVER-SANDS
- Postcode district: LA11
- Dialling code: 015394
- Police: Cumbria
- Fire: Cumbria
- Ambulance: North West
- UK Parliament: Westmorland and Lonsdale

Beck Head is a village in Cumbria, England.
