= Begdale =

Hamlet between Wisbech, Elm and Friday Bridge in Cambridgeshire, England

Coordinates: 52.63°N 00.14°E

- Location within Cambridgeshire
- OS grid reference: TF4506
- Shire county: Cambridgeshire
- Region: East
- Country: England
- Sovereign state: United Kingdom
- Police: Cambridgeshire
- Fire: Cambridgeshire
- Ambulance: East of England

Begdale is a hamlet between Wisbech, Elm and Friday Bridge in Cambridgeshire, England.
