= Beamhurst Lane =

Hamlet in Staffordshire, England

Coordinates: 52.920°N 1.907°W

- Location within Staffordshire
- OS grid reference: SK0635
- Shire county: Staffordshire
- Region: West Midlands
- Country: England
- Sovereign state: United Kingdom
- Police: Staffordshire
- Fire: Staffordshire
- Ambulance: West Midlands

Beamhurst Lane is a hamlet in Uttoxeter Rural, Staffordshire, England. It lies 19 km (12 mi) north-east of Stafford and 198 km (123 mi) north-west of London.
