= Bedlar's Green =

Hamlet in Essex, England

Coordinates: 51.861°N 0.212°E

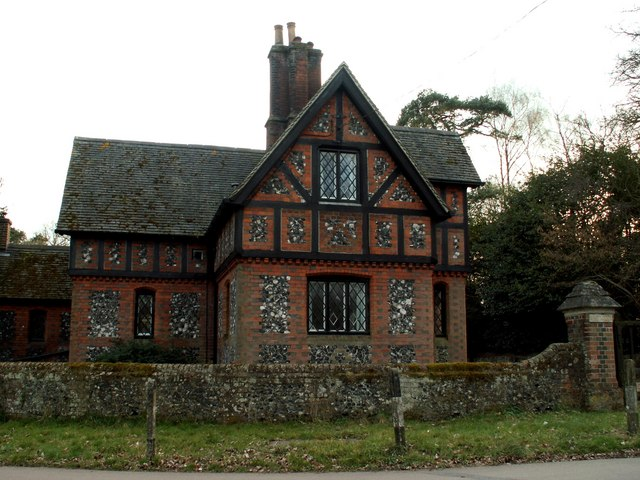
- East Lodge

- Location within Essex
- OS grid reference: TL5220
- Civil parish: Great Hallingbury
- District: Uttlesford
- Shire county: Essex
- Region: East
- Country: England
- Sovereign state: United Kingdom
- Police: Essex
- Fire: Essex
- Ambulance: East of England

Bedlar's Green is a hamlet in the civil parish of Great Hallingbury, in the Uttlesford district of Essex, England, adjacent to the village of Great Hallingbury.
