= Beechcliff =

Village in Staffordshire, England

Coordinates: 52.947°N 2.215°W

- Location within Staffordshire
- OS grid reference: SJ8538
- Shire county: Staffordshire
- Region: West Midlands
- Country: England
- Sovereign state: United Kingdom
- Post town: Stoke-on-Trent
- Postcode district: ST12
- Police: Staffordshire
- Fire: Staffordshire
- Ambulance: West Midlands

Beechcliff is a hamlet in Staffordshire, England. For population details at the 2011 census see Swynnerton
