= Beaconhill =

Housing estate in Northumberland, in England

Coordinates: 55.082°N 1.602°W

- Location within Northumberland
- OS grid reference: NZ255765
- Shire county: Northumberland
- Region: North East
- Country: England
- Sovereign state: United Kingdom
- Post town: CRAMLINGTON
- Postcode district: NE23
- Police: Northumbria
- Fire: Northumberland
- Ambulance: North East

Beaconhill is a housing estate in Northumberland, in England. It is in the west of Cramlington, north of Newcastle upon Tyne. It is served by a primary school.
