= Beamhurst =

Village in Staffordshire, England

Coordinates: 52.924°N 1.913°W

- Location within Staffordshire
- OS grid reference: SK0536
- Shire county: Staffordshire
- Region: West Midlands
- Country: England
- Sovereign state: United Kingdom
- Post town: Uttoxeter
- Postcode district: ST14 5
- Police: Staffordshire
- Fire: Staffordshire
- Ambulance: West Midlands

Beamhurst is a village in Staffordshire, England. For population details taken at the 2011 census see Croxden.
