= Beggarington =

Hamlet near Bradley, West Yorkshire, England

Coordinates: 53.7042°N 1.7216°W

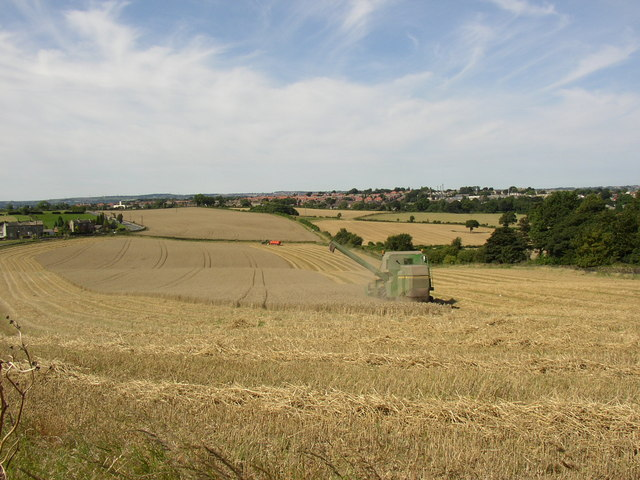
Fields near Beggarington, with the houses of the hamlet to the left

Beggarington, also known as Beggerington and Begerington is a hamlet consisting of a few houses about 0.4 miles (0.6 km) north of Hartshead in Kirklees, West Yorkshire. It is situated in a bend of the B6119 road at the junction with the road from Roberttown. Beggerington has traditionally been considered a part of Hartshead. The place name means either "where the berries grow" or is related to beggar.

A coal mine was recorded here in the 19th century as "Beggarington Pit, Hartshead".
