= Beffcote =

Village in Staffordshire, England

Coordinates: 52.768°N 2.291°W

- Location within Staffordshire
- OS grid reference: SJ8019
- Shire county: Staffordshire
- Region: West Midlands
- Country: England
- Sovereign state: United Kingdom
- Post town: Stafford
- Postcode district: ST20 0
- Police: Staffordshire
- Fire: Staffordshire
- Ambulance: West Midlands

Beffcote is a village in Staffordshire, England. For the population taken at the United Kingdom Census 2011 see Gnosall.
