= Stanmore Village railway station =

Former railway station in England

Stanmore Village
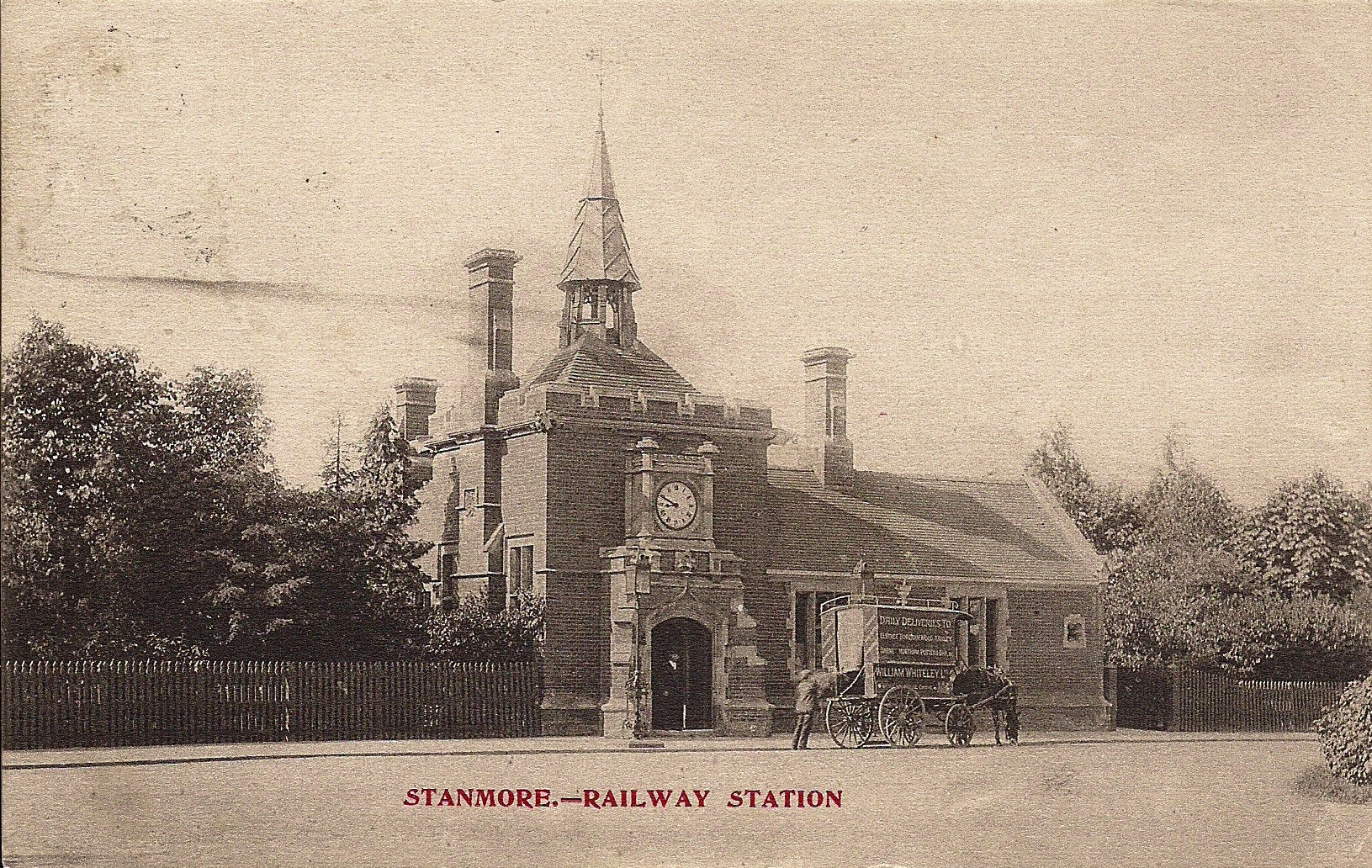
- Stanmore Village station
- Interactive map of Stanmore Village

General information
- Location: Stanmore
- Local authority: Harrow
- Owner: London & North Western Railway
- Number of platforms: 1

Key dates
- 1890: Opened
- 1952: Closed to passengers
- 1964: Closed for freight
- Replaced by: none

Other information
- Coordinates: 51.6131°N 0.3131°W

Stanmore Village railway station was a station in Stanmore, Middlesex in the south of England (now in Greater London). Originally called simply Stanmore, it was opened on 18 December 1890 by the Harrow and Stanmore Railway, a company owned by the hotel millionaire Frederick Gordon, as the terminus of the Stanmore branch line, a short branch line running north from Harrow & Wealdstone. Trains were operated by the London & North Western Railway (LNWR).

The station was located on the south side of the junction of Gordon Avenue and Old Church Lane (the section north of the junction was originally named Station Road), and was noted for its architectural style, designed to resemble a village church, including a short spire. It closed to passenger traffic in 1952.

== History ==
In 1882 the entrepreneur and hotelier Frederick Gordon purchased Bentley Priory, a large country house near Stanmore. He planned to open it up as a country retreat for wealthy guests. Known as "The Napoleon of the Hotel World", Gordon was a successful international businessman, and had earned his millions through his international hotel chain.

At the time, Stanmore was a remote, rural location, and Gordon built his own railway line from Harrow in an attempt to attract affluent clientele to his country hotel. He negotiated a contract with the LNWR, the railway company that owned the mainline at Harrow, to operate the Stanmore line on his behalf.

Gordon's scheme met with some local opposition and he was forced to re-route the railway line further east to mitigate objections. The site for a terminus was selected in Old Church Lane in Stanmore. To allay the concerns of the local inhabitants — and to appeal to his well-heeled customers — Gordon commissioned an architect to design an elegant station building that resembled a Gothic-style English country church. The Stanmore branch line opened to great fanfare on 18 December 1890.

The connection to the main line at Harrow & Wealdstone station faced away from London preventing through trains operating without a reversal; the passenger service was thus operated as a shuttle from Harrow and Wealdstone to Stanmore, normally run as a push–pull train.

=== Decline ===
The opening in 1932 by the Metropolitan Railway of its own Stanmore station about 1 km (0.6 mi) to the north-east (later served by the Bakerloo line and now by the Jubilee line), introduced a rapid, direct service to the West End and the City of London. This presented strong competition to the Village station, now operated by the London, Midland and Scottish Railway (LMS). An intermediate station on the LMS branch line was constructed at Belmont in order to attract more passengers, opening on 12 September 1932.

Stanmore station was renamed Stanmore Village on 25 September 1950 in order to distinguish it from the nearby Underground station. Declining receipts led to the passenger service being withdrawn on 15 September 1952, but a shuttle service continued between Belmont and Harrow. The London Transport 158 bus route provided alternative services. A daily freight train continued using the line beyond Belmont.

=== Closure ===
In 1963 the entire Stanmore branch line was marked for closure as part of the Beeching cuts. On 6 July 1964 the goods line from Belmont to Stanmore was shut; by then the run-round loop had been removed so goods wagons were propelled from Harrow and Wealdstone station. The last passenger train on the remaining section ran from Belmont to Harrow on 5 October 1964.

The railway tracks were taken up in 1966 and the remaining trackbed was purchased by Harrow Council. Sections of the former line were sold off and built upon, but most of the line was left to grow wild. The Stanmore Village platform buildings were demolished in the 1970s for the construction of a road of new houses, September Way, which was built along part of the track alignment. Despite its architectural merit, Stanmore Village station was allowed to fall into ruin. Attempts were made to preserve the building, but it suffered from neglect and vandalism. In 1969 it was redeveloped by a property developer, who removed most of the Gothic architectural features and converted it into a residential property, which still stands today on Gordon Avenue. A plaque mounted on the wall of the house indicates the site of the station.

== Architecture ==
Stanmore was an affluent and conservative community, and Great Stanmore Parish Council stipulated that Frederick Gordon's new station building should be of a high-quality design that would blend in with its surroundings. The station was built in a Gothic style, deliberately design to resemble a small English church complete with a square tower topped with a spire and decorated with gargoyles, a large clock on top of a buttressed Gothic portico, and an ecclesiastical-style entrance door. The station had a single platform covered by a cast-iron and glass canopy. The supporting pillars bore the coat of arms of the Gordon family: three boars' heads surrounded by thistles and roses.

== Filming location ==
Stanmore Village station was used as a filming location for several productions including The Gold Express (1955), which starred Vernon Gray and Ivy St. Helier, and a BBC television play, The Sun and I (1955).

== Gallery ==
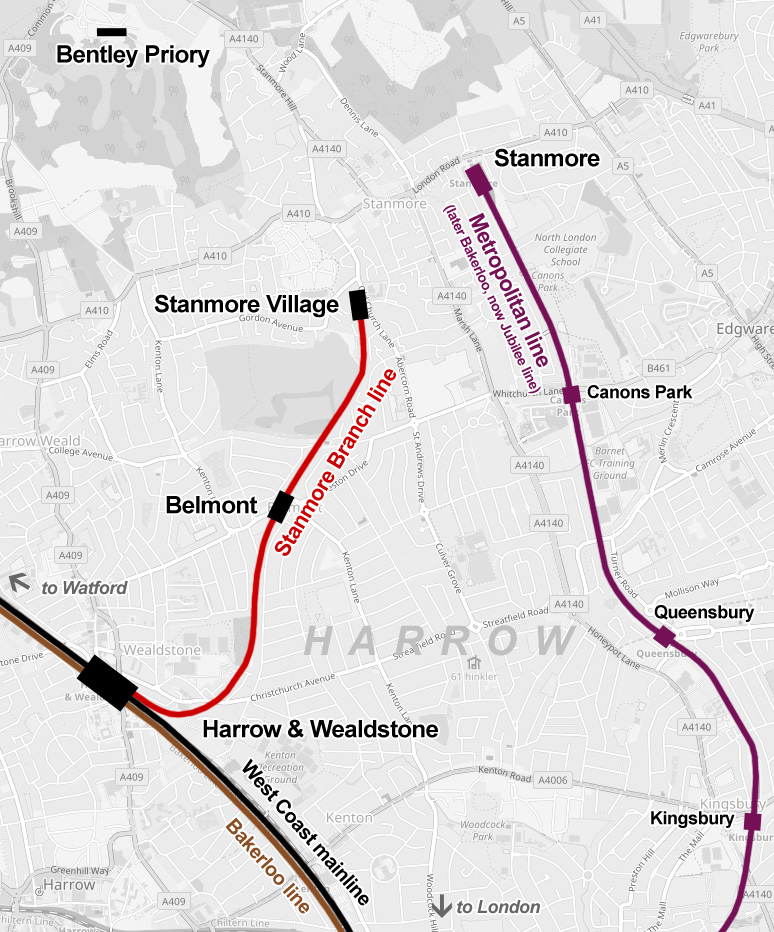
Map of the Stanmore branch line

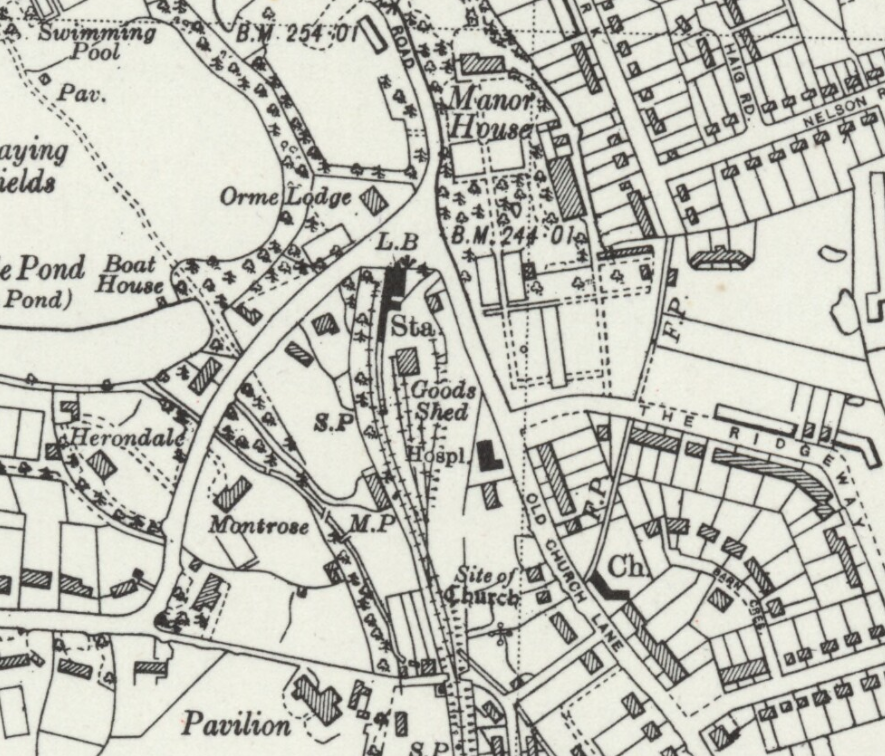
Stanmore Village station shown on a 1938 map

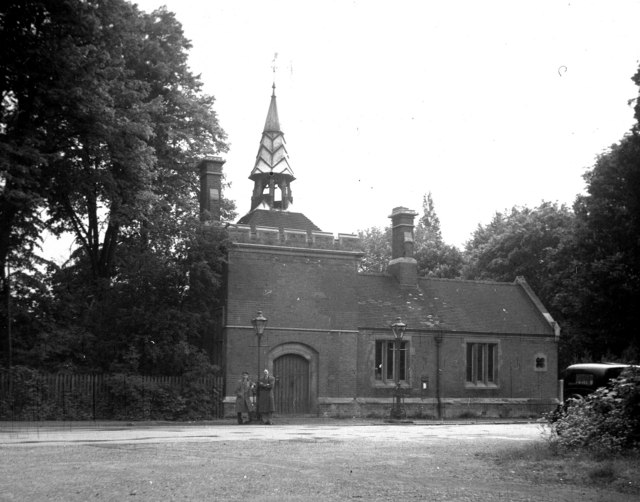
The station building in 1957, the clock and entrance porch removed

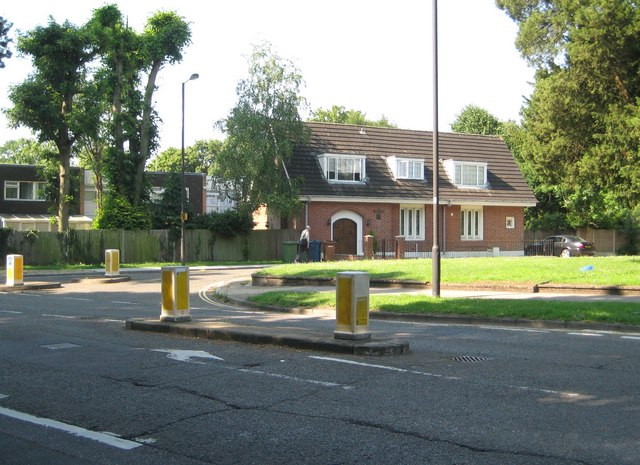
The station building has been redeveloped as a modern residence

== See also ==
- Edgware railway station, a station around 1.6 miles (2.6 km) from Stanmore Village which closed in 1939
- List of closed railway stations in London
- List of closed railway stations in Britain
- Closed London Underground stations

Preceding station	Disused railways	Following station
Belmont; Line and station closed	British Railways; Stanmore branch line	Terminus
