= Beazley End =

Village in Essex, England

Coordinates: 51.935°N 00.535°E

- Location within Essex
- OS grid reference: TL7429
- Shire county: Essex
- Region: East
- Country: England
- Sovereign state: United Kingdom
- Police: Essex
- Fire: Essex
- Ambulance: East of England

Beazley End is a village in Essex, England.
