= Grade I and II* listed buildings in the London Borough of Harrow =

There are over 9,000 Grade I listed buildings and 20,000 Grade II* listed buildings in England. This page is a list of these buildings in the London Borough of Harrow.

== Grade I ==
Name	Location	Type	Completed (Note: The date given is the date used by Historic England as significant for the initial building or that of an important part in the structure's description.)	Date designated	Grid ref. (Note: Sometimes known as OSGB36, the grid reference is based on the British national grid reference system used by the Ordnance Survey.) Geo-coordinates	Entry number (Note: The "List Entry Number" is a unique number assigned to each listed building and scheduled monument by Historic England.)	Image
Church of St Lawrence	Little Stanmore, Harrow	Church	Early 16th century (Note: Heavily modified in the 18th century; the most interesting features of the building date to this period.)	21 September 1951	TQ1855891329; 51°36′30″N 0°17′22″W	1194471	Church of St Lawrence More images
Headstone Manor	Harrow	Hall House	Early 15th century	21 September 1951	TQ1409689705; 51°35′41″N 0°21′15″W	1285855	Headstone Manor More images
Parish Church of St Mary	Harrow on the Hill, Harrow	Church	Norman	21 September 1951	TQ1531687452; 51°34′27″N 0°20′15″W	1079742	Parish Church of St Mary More images
The Old Schools, Harrow School	Harrow on the Hill, Harrow	School	1615	21 September 1951	TQ1531987361; 51°34′24″N 0°20′15″W	1079741	The Old Schools, Harrow School More images

== Grade II* ==
Name	Location	Type	Completed	Date designated	Grid ref. Geo-coordinates	Entry number	Image
Ace Cinema	Rayners Lane, Harrow	Cinema	1936	13 March 1981	TQ1301087371; 51°34′26″N 0°22′14″W	1079729	Ace Cinema More images
Barn South West of Headstone Manor	Headstone, Harrow	Barn	c. 1600	21 September 1951	TQ1404189686; 51°35′40″N 0°21′18″W	1358623	Barn South West of Headstone Manor More images
Central Entrance Block to Bentley Priory	Stanmore, Harrow	House	1789–90	25 May 1983	TQ1547393279; 51°37′35″N 0°20′00″W	1358638	Central Entrance Block to Bentley Priory More images
Church of All Saints	Harrow Weald, Harrow	Church	1842	24 February 1982	TQ1533091725; 51°36′45″N 0°20′09″W	1358649	Church of All Saints More images
Church of St John	Great Stanmore	Church	1849	25 May 1983	TQ1671992164; 51°36′58″N 0°18′56″W	1193096	Church of St John More images
Church of St John the Baptist	Pinner	Church	13th century	21 September 1951	TQ1239089656; 51°35′40″N 0°22′44″W	1286312	Church of St John the Baptist More images
Church of St Mary	Kenton	Parish Hall	1935-6	29 November 1993	TQ1718488783; 51°35′09″N 0°18′36″W	1254054	Church of St Mary More images
East End Farm Cottage	Pinner	House	Early 15th century	21 September 1951	TQ1257689918; 51°35′49″N 0°22′34″W	1358620	Upload Photo
Grim's Dyke	Harrow Weald, Harrow	House	1872	5 September 1969	TQ1417992883; 51°37′23″N 0°21′07″W	1079676	Grim's Dyke More images
Harrow School Chapel	Harrow on the Hill, Harrow	School	1854–57	9 July 1968	TQ1537487350; 51°34′24″N 0°20′12″W	1079728	Harrow School Chapel More images
Harrow School Speech Room	Harrow on the Hill, Harrow	School	1872–1877	9 July 1968	TQ1536887420; 51°34′26″N 0°20′12″W	1193321	Harrow School Speech Room More images
Harrow School Vaughan Library	Harrow on the Hill, Harrow	School	1861-3	9 July 1968	TQ1537487316; 51°34′22″N 0°20′12″W	1193423	Harrow School Vaughan Library More images
Harrow School War Memorial Building	Harrow on the Hill, Harrow	War memorial	1926	9 July 1968	TQ1535287365; 51°34′24″N 0°20′13″W	1358630	Harrow School War Memorial Building More images
Harrow Weald House Farm	Harrow Weald, Harrow	House	c. 1500	25 May 1983	TQ1538991300; 51°36′31″N 0°20′06″W	1286262	Upload Photo
No. 73 Stanmore Hill	Stanmore, Harrow	House	Early 18th century	21 September 1951	TQ1669492626; 51°37′13″N 0°18′57″W	1358643	No. 73 Stanmore Hill More images
Old Stanmore Church	Stanmore, Harrow	Church	1632	21 September 1951	TQ1664792157; 51°36′58″N 0°19′00″W	1079747	Old Stanmore Church More images
Pinner House	Pinner, Harrow	House	17th century	21 September 1951	TQ1246289598; 51°35′38″N 0°22′40″W	1358615	Pinner House More images
Stanmore Hall	Stanmore, Harrow	Town House	c. 1843	26 August 1971	TQ1650993067; 51°37′28″N 0°19′06″W	1194606	Stanmore Hall More images
Sweetmans Hall	Pinner	House	Late C16	21 September 1951	TQ1175689614; 51°35′39″N 0°23′17″W	1194385	Upload Photo
The White Cottage	Harrow on the Hill, Harrow	House	1908	22 December 1982	TQ1527686447; 51°33′54″N 0°20′18″W	1079652	The White Cottage
