= Roycroft (surname) =

Roycroft is a surname. Notable people with the surname include:

- Annie Roycroft (1926–2019), Ireland’s first female newspaper editor
- Bill Roycroft (1915–2011), Australian equestrian
- Chris Roycroft (born 1997), American baseball player
- Chris Roycroft-Davis (born 1948), journalist
- Clarke Roycroft (born 1950), Australian equestrian
- Dan Roycroft (born 1978), Canadian cross-country skier
- David Roycroft (born 1947), British diplomat
- John Roycroft (born 1929), English chess composer and writer
- Maurice Roycroft (born 1960), known as Maurice Seezer, Irish musician and composer
- Wayne Roycroft (born 1946), Australian equestrian
