= Pinner =

Area of north west London

Coordinates: 51.5932°N 0.3894°W

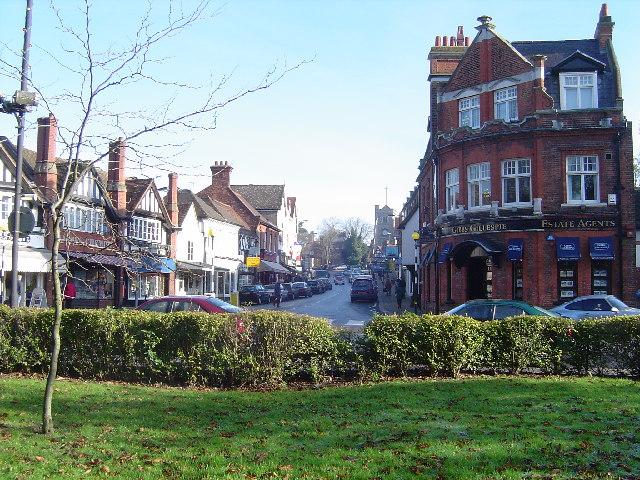
- High Street

- Location within Greater London
- Population: 38,698 2011 Census
- OS grid reference: TQ115895
  - Charing Cross: 12.2 miles (19.6 km) SE
- London borough: Harrow
- Ceremonial county: Greater London
- Region: London
- Country: England
- Sovereign state: United Kingdom
- Post town: PINNER
- Postcode district: HA5
- Dialling code: 020
- Police: Metropolitan
- Fire: London
- Ambulance: London
- UK Parliament: Ruislip, Northwood and Pinner
- London Assembly: Brent and Harrow

Pinner is a suburb in the London Borough of Harrow, northwest London, England, 12 miles (19 km) northwest of Charing Cross, close to the border with Hillingdon, historically in the county of Middlesex. The population was 38,698 in 2021.

Pinner originated as a mediaeval hamlet; St John Baptist church dates from the 14th century, and other parts of the historic village include Tudor buildings. The newer High Street is mainly 18th-century buildings, while Bridge Street has a more urban character and many chain stores.

== History ==
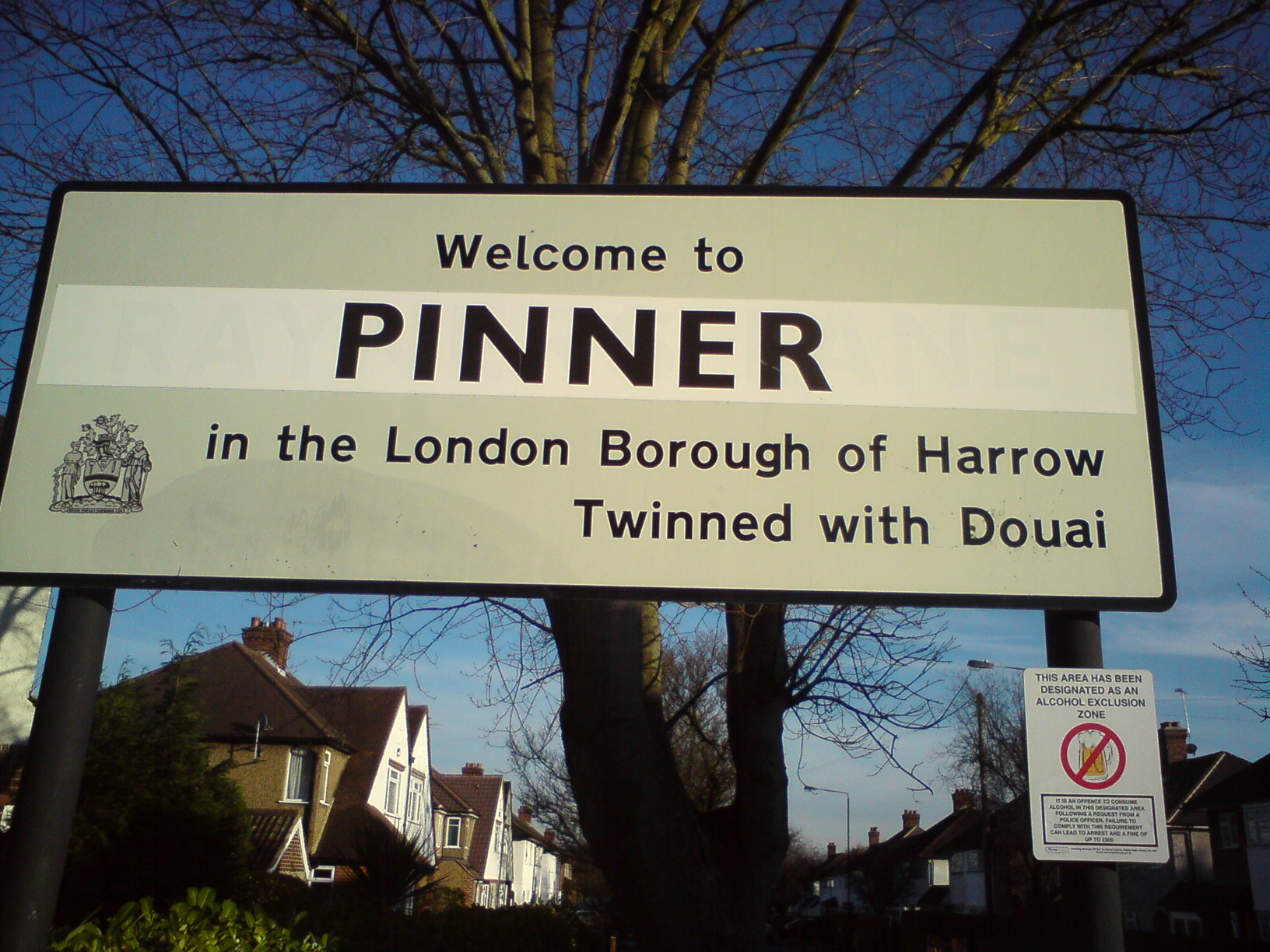
Street sign

Pinner was originally a hamlet, first recorded in 1231 as Pinnora, although the already archaic -ora (meaning 'hill') suggests its origins lie no later than circa 900. The name Pinn is shared with the River Pinn, which runs through the middle of Pinner. Another suggestion of the name is that it means 'hill-slope shaped like a pin'.

The oldest part of the town lies around the fourteenth-century parish church of St. John the Baptist, at the junction of the present day Grange Gardens, High Street and Church Lane. The church was originally a chapel of ease to St Mary's Church, Harrow on the Hill, and was first mentioned in 1234. It was rebuilt in the early fourteenth-century, and rededicated in 1321. The parish became independent of St Mary's in 1766, when the first perpetual curate was appointed; not until the Wilberforce Act of 1868 did it appoint its first vicar, one William Hind. The earliest surviving private dwelling, East End Farm Cottage, dates from the late fifteenth century.

The village expanded rapidly between 1923 and 1939, when a series of garden estates, including the architecturally significant Pinnerwood estate conservation area – encouraged by the Metropolitan Railway – grew around its historic core. It was largely from this time onwards that the area (including Hatch End, which forms the northeastern part of Pinner) assumed much of its present-day suburban character. The area is now contiguous with neighbouring suburban districts including Rayners Lane and Eastcote.

Pinner contains a large number of homes built in the 1930s Art Deco style, the most grand of which is the Grade II listed Elm Park Court at the junction of West End Lane and Elm Park Road. Pinner is also the site of one of the UK's oldest chartered fairs, called Pinner Fair, which has been held annually since 1336.

Pinner lay within the historic county of Middlesex; it was located at the western end of the hundred of Gore, before it was in the Hendon Rural District. In 1965 it became a part of the London Borough of Harrow in the newly formed ceremonial county of Greater London.

=== Parish church ===
Pinner's St John the Baptist parish church was consecrated in 1321, but built on the site of an earlier Christian place of worship. The west tower and south porch date from the 15th century.

== Governance ==
Harrow Council has been governed by the Conservative Party since 2022. Pinner has two wards, Pinner and Pinner South, each represented by three Conservative councillors. Pinner is in the Brent and Harrow constituency for the London Assembly which has been represented since 2024 by Krupesh Hirani (Labour). Since the 2010 general election, Pinner has been part of the Ruislip, Northwood and Pinner parliamentary constituency, currently served by David Simmonds.

On 1 April 1934 the civil parish was abolished to form Harrow. At the 1931 census (the last before the abolition of the parish), Pinner had a population of 23,082.

== Geography ==
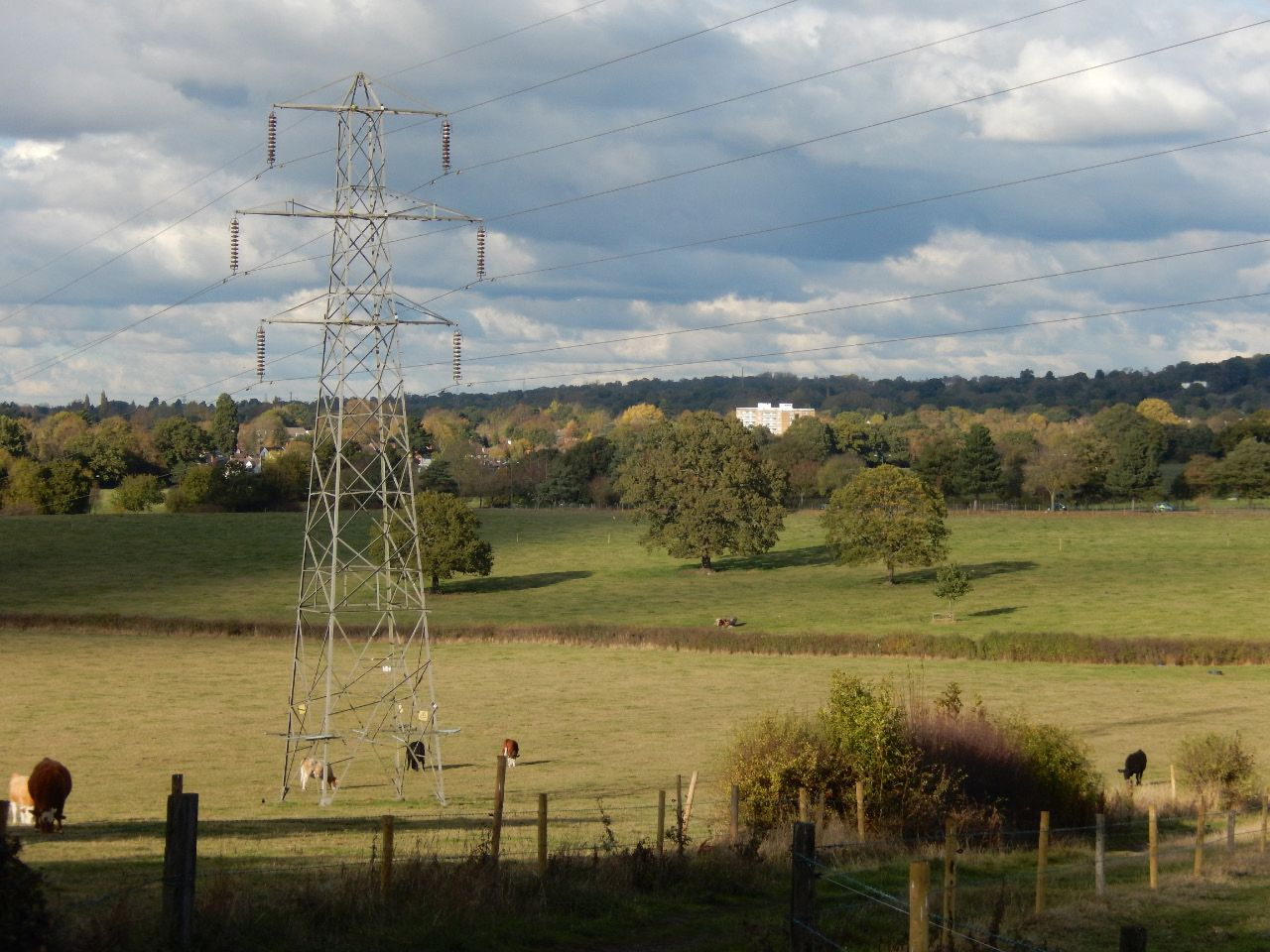
Farmland near Pinner

Pinner includes Pinner Village at its centre, along with the localities of Pinner Green and Pinnerwood Park Conservation Area to the north. To the north east is the larger area of Hatch End, served by Hatch End railway station (originally opened as Pinner).

The River Pinn flows through Pinner, flowing in a diagonal direction. Large parks and open spaces are Pinner Memorial Park, Pinner Village Gardens, Roxbourne Gardens, Pinner Wood (woodlands) and Pinner Park (farmland).

Pinner Memorial Park has a large house in it which includes a museum to Illustrator Heath Robinson as well as a cafe which hosts regular music events throughout the summer; while Roxbourne Gardens also hosts a pop-up cafe and music venue on Sundays year-round.

Much of Pinner has an elevation of about 148 feet (45 m) to 200 feet (60 m). Nower Hill rises to a peak of about 260 feet (80 m) above sea level while Pinner Park peaks at 203 feet (62 m). The semi-rural Pinnerwood area is steep, and rises to a peak of over 390 feet (120 m) around Pinner Hill Golf Course.

== Demography ==
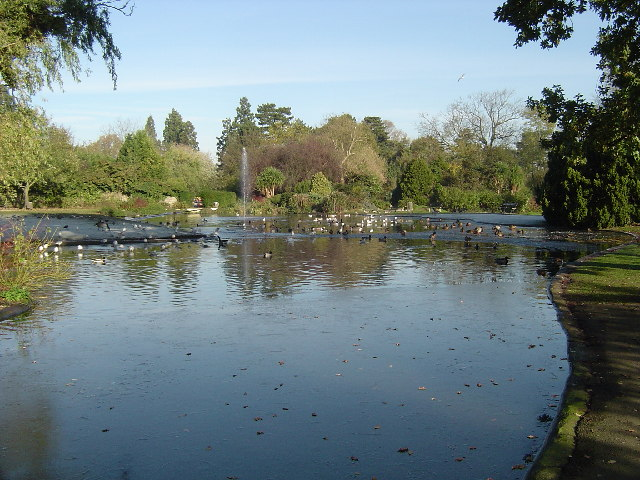
The lake at Pinner Memorial Park

Pinner is both a religiously and culturally mixed area, with the ethnic minority population having grown significantly since the 1970s. Pinner ward nonetheless had the highest concentration of people describing themselves as white in the London Borough of Harrow, at 72 per cent of the population in 2011. In 2013 the Pinner South ward had the next highest proportion of white people in the borough at 69.4 per cent. Various churches, a synagogue and others serve the religious needs of the community.

Pinner also has several independent schools and single-sex schools. In the 2014/15 period, the Pinner South ward had a crime rate of 24.5, which was the lowest out of all 628 wards of Greater London. The ward also has (data from 2009 to 2013) the second highest female life expectancy in the capital: 91.7 years, only bettered by Holland ward in Kensington and Chelsea.

== Fairs and fetes ==
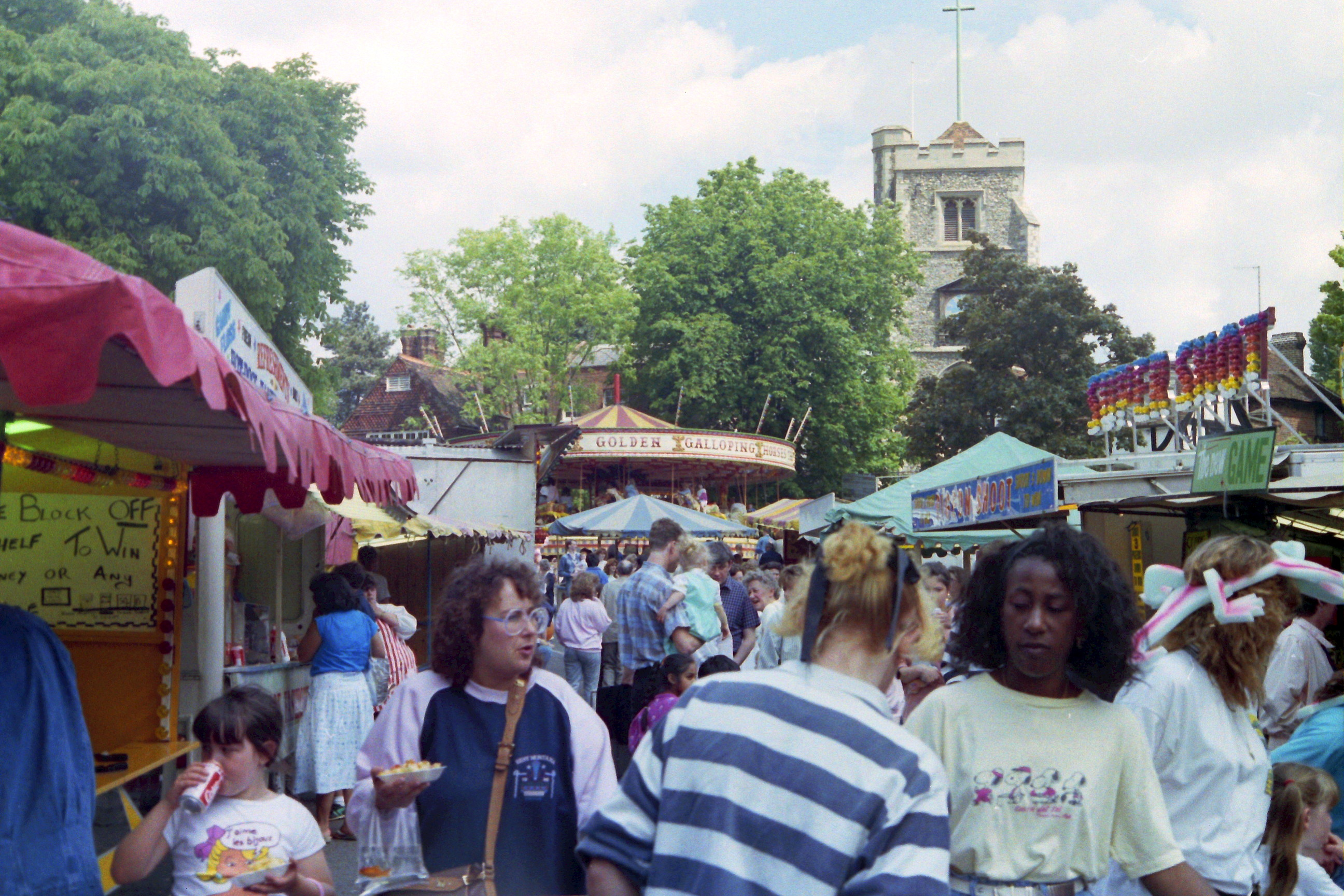
Crowds at Pinner Fair, 1988

Pinner holds a number of fairs and fetes that are renowned in north west London for bringing its diverse and cosmopolitan community together.

Pinner Fair has been held annually since 1336, when it was granted by Royal Charter by King Edward III. The fair still draws thousand of people and families from Pinner and the surrounding areas in North West London. The Pinner Fair was cancelled in 2020 and 2021 due to the COVID-19 pandemic, but the fair's charter was preserved. To keep the annual tradition going, a small selection of non-operational rides were put up in 2020, and the Vicar came out to bless the showmen.

Pinner Donkey Derby and Fete, held between 1925 and 1939 was a Charity event organised by Rev. John Caulfield, parish priest of St. Luke's, Pinner and Steve Donoghue, a leading flat-race jockey. Huge crowds would turn up to see the Derby, as it was also a chance to see celebrities and sporting personalities of the era.

St. George’s Day annual celebrations are organised by the Rotary Club of Pinner and features the "Ye Olde Wheelbarrow Race".

== Sport and leisure ==
Pinner has a rugby union team, Pinner and Grammarians RFC, a member club of the Rugby Football Union. It is the most junior team to have supplied a President to the RFU. Pinner also has a cricket team, Pinner Cricket Club, and a youth football club, Pinner United FC. The area also has a golf course, Pinner Golf course.

In addition to numerous restaurants and a number of public houses, Pinner has an amateur theatre group, Pinner Players, who have been performing in the area since 1936 and currently stage productions at Pinner Village Hall off Chapel Lane.

The Heath Robinson Museum in Pinner Memorial Park was opened in 2016 and is dedicated to the work of the cartoonist William Heath Robinson.

== In popular culture ==
=== Literature ===
Edward Lear makes reference to Pinner in More Nonsense Pictures, Rhymes, Botany, etc:

There was an old person of Pinner,
As thin as a lath, if not thinner;
They dressed him in white,
And roll'd him up tight,
That elastic old person of Pinner.

H. G. Wells mentions Pinner in The War of the Worlds:

He learned they were the wife and the younger sister of a surgeon living at Stanmore, who had come in the small hours from a dangerous case at Pinner, and heard at some railway station on his way of the Martian advance.

=== Broadcast media ===
- In the BBC radio soap opera Mrs Dale's Diary, the couple lived at Virginia Lodge in the fictional London Metro-land-style suburb of Parkwood Hill, which was said to be based on Pinner (although Sutton has also been suggested).
- The Pinner Fair held in Pinner High Street features in Sir John Betjeman's 1973 BBC film Metro-Land.
- The BBC sitcom May to December (1989–1994) was set in Pinner.
- Chucklevision, the children's TV series based on the Chuckle Brothers was also filmed in Pinner.
- Between 2000 and 2006 Pinner was used for location footage for BBC sitcom My Hero, starring Ardal O'Hanlon as Thermoman.
- Channel 4's coming-of-age television teen sitcom The Inbetweeners, Season 1 (2008), Episode 2 "Bunk Off" was filmed on the High Street in Pinner.
- The 2009 film Nowhere Boy had a number of scenes filmed in Pinner, including outside the Queens Head Pub, Pinner High Street,
- The 2012 film May I Kill U?, written and directed by Stuart Urban and starring Kevin Bishop, was also filmed in Pinner.
- The documentary series, Great British Railway Journeys, Series 6 (2015), Episode 6, "Amersham to Regent's Park" features Michael Portillo in Pinner, where he finds out about a Victorian domestic goddess (Isabella Beeton) and whips up a pint of her fanciest ice cream.
- BBC Radio 1's 24 Years at the Tap End (2011–) is Chris Stark's memoir of growing up in and around Pinner during the turn of the millennium.
- BBC Radio 5 Live's hit podcast That Peter Crouch Podcast (2018–) has many references to Pinner, Hatch End and the surrounding areas.
- Rocketman (2019), the biographical musical film based on the life and music of British musician Elton John, had a number of scenes filmed in and around Pinner. Oakmeade substituted for Pinner Hill Road as Elton John's childhood home and Albury Drive as his father's home.
- The British dark comedy-drama spy thriller television series Killing Eve's Season 3 (2020), Episode 5, is titled "Are You from Pinner?". This is in reference to the character Bor'ka's fondness of Elton John.

== Notable people ==
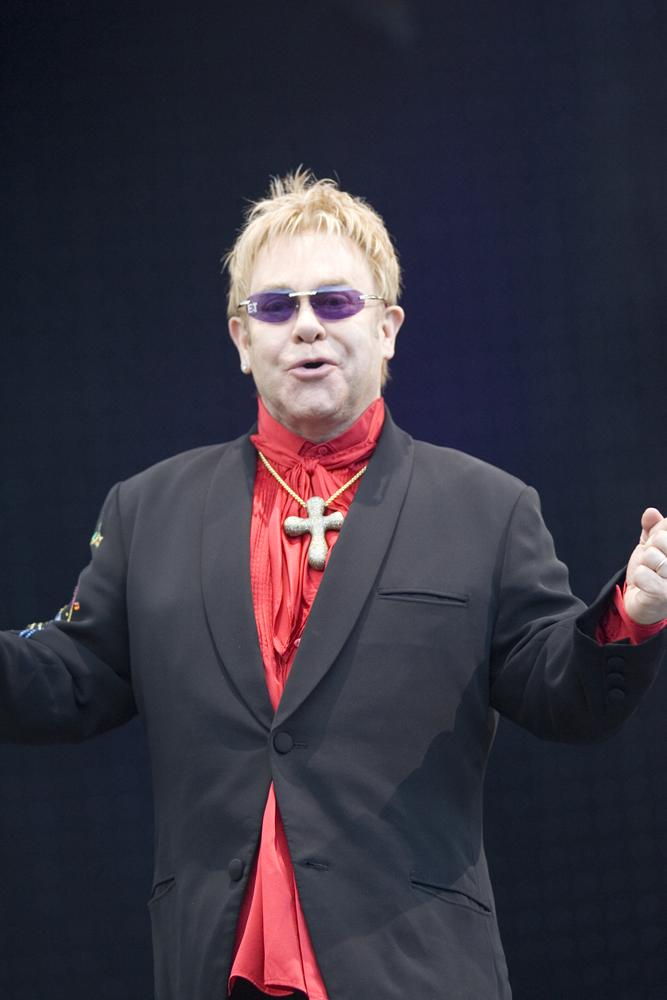
Sir Elton John was born and grew up in Pinner

- Ronnie Barker and David Suchet were both one-time owners of 17th-century Elmdene in Church Lane.
- Samuel and Isabella Beeton lived on the Woodridings estate between 1856 and 1862, during which time Mrs Beeton's Book of Household Management was published.
- Derek Bell, motor racing driver, was born in Pinner.
- Edward Bulwer-Lytton wrote Eugene Aram at Pinner Wood House in 1832.
- Ivy Compton-Burnett, novelist, was born in the village in 1884.
- Daniel Dancer, the famed miser, was born in here in 1716.
- Charlie Dore, singer, was born here.
- Jo Durden-Smith, British documentary film maker, writer and journalist, was born here in 1941.
- Daniel Finkelstein is a Pinner resident and was created Baron Finkelstein of Pinner in 2013.
- W. S. Gilbert was a magistrate in Pinner from 1893 onwards.
- Tony Hatch, composer of the Petula Clark hit "Downtown" and many other television themes, including the Neighbours theme, was born here.
- Bob Holness, the former host of quiz show Blockbusters, lived here.
- Peter Jacobs, Olympic fencer, was born here in 1938.
- Elton John, singer and songwriter grew up in Pinner Green and was educated at Pinner Wood Junior School, Reddiford School and Pinner County Grammar School.
- Norman Kember, Christian pacifist activist and Emeritus Professor of Biophysics, is a longtime resident of the town.
- Brian Lane, pilot, grew up in the village.
- Lee Latchford-Evans, singer, dancer, stage actor, and one of the five members of the British pop group Steps, lives and works in Pinner.
- Simon Le Bon, vocalist of post-punk rock band Duran Duran, grew up locally and attended the Pinner County Grammar School.
- Liza Lehmann, composer, lived at 'Nascot', Waxwell Lane, Pinner for several years after her marriage to Herbert Bedford in 1894.
- Caroline Alice Lejeune, film critic, lived here with her husband Edward Roffe Thompson, a journalist.
- Jane March, actress and model, grew up here before moving to the United States. Earlier in her career, March was referred to in the press as "The Sinner From Pinner".
- Agnes Marshall, a celebrity chef and culinary entrepreneur, who published the first certain mention of eating ice cream from a cone, had a country home there and died there in 1905.
- Patrick Moore, the television presenter and astronomer, was born in Pinner in 1923.
- Horatia Nelson, daughter of Lord Nelson and Lady Emma Hamilton, lived in Pinner from 1860 until her death in 1881.
- Lucy Porter, comedian, actress and writer, lives in Pinner.
- Henry James Pye (poet laureate) retired to East End House in 1811.
- Heath Robinson, cartoonist, illustrator and artist, lived in Moss Lane, Pinner between 1913 and 1918. The Heath Robinson Museum is in Pinner Memorial Park.
- Michael Rosen, poet and children's author, lived in Pinner from the time he was born, in 1946, until 1962.
- Chris Roycroft-Davis, journalist (The Sun) is a resident.
- Chris Stark, radio presenter, grew up in and around Pinner.
- David "Screaming Lord" Sutch, who lived in nearby South Harrow, is buried in Pinner New Cemetery.
- Gordon Waller of Peter and Gordon lived with his family in the house called Elton, Elm Park Road, and went to St John's prep school before boarding at Westminster School.
- Molly Weir, best known for her role as the long-running character Hazel the McWitch in the BBC TV series Rentaghost, lived in Pinner until her death in 2004.
- Bruce Welch, guitarist in The Shadows, lived in Pinner.
- Maude Valerie White, composer, lived in Love Lane, Pinner during the 1890s.

== Transport ==
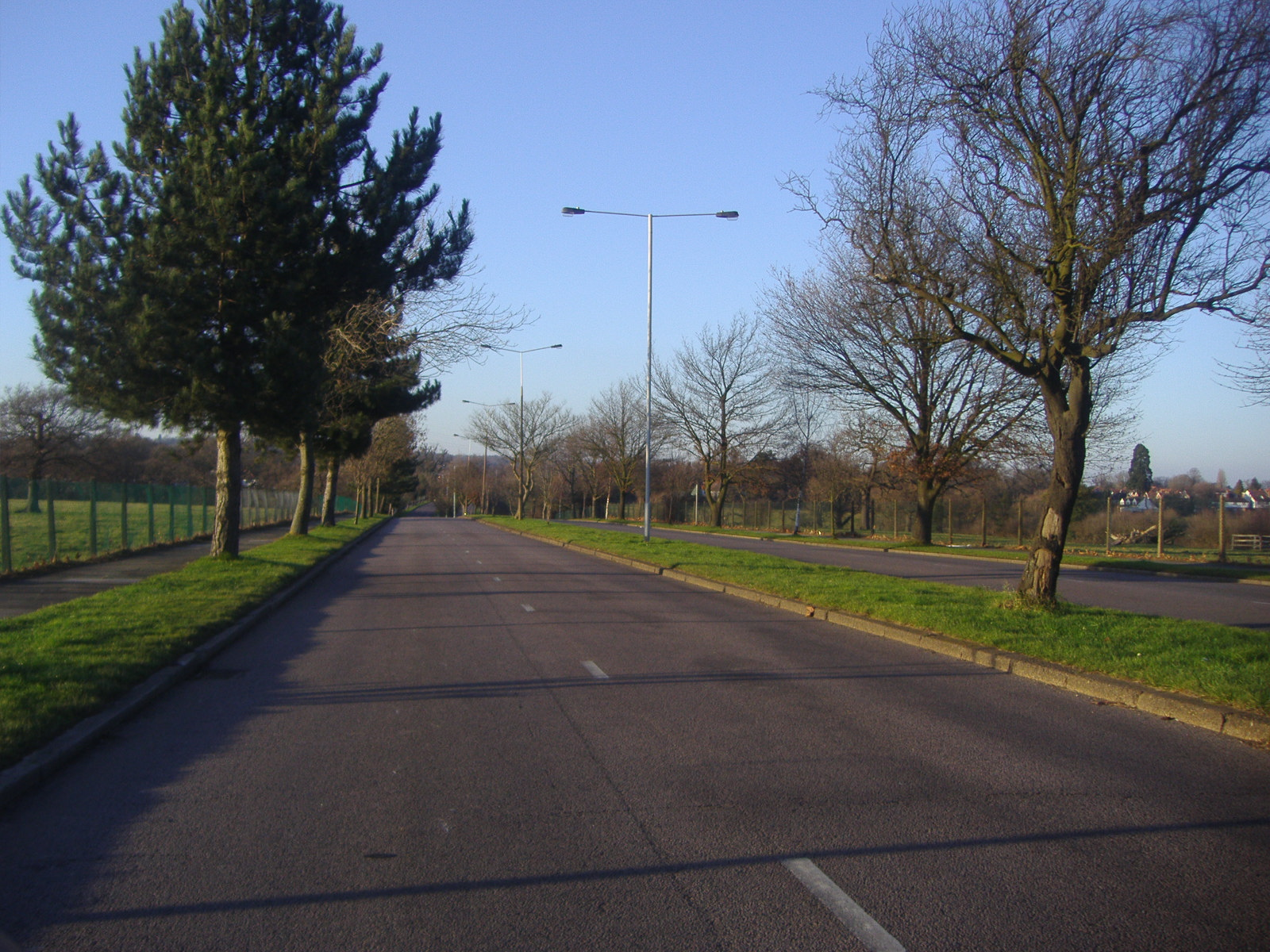
George V Avenue dual carriageway, which cuts through Pinner Park

=== Rail ===
Pinner Underground station was opened in 1885 and is on the Metropolitan line in London fare zone 5. In normal off-peak conditions the train takes approximately half an hour to Baker Street Underground station and approximately three-quarters of an hour to Aldgate Underground station.

Hatch End railway station was opened in 1842 and is on the London Overground Lioness line in London fare zone 6. In normal off-peak conditions it roughly takes three-quarters of an hour to Euston railway station.

=== Buses ===
Route	Start	End	Operator
183	Pinner, Bridge Street	Golders Green Bus Station	London Sovereign
H11	Harrow Bus Station	Northwood, Mount Vernon Hospital,	London Sovereign
H12	South Harrow Bus Station	Stanmore Station	London Sovereign
H13	Ruislip Lido	Northwood Hills, St Vincent's Park	Metroline
398	Ruislip Station	Greenford, Hemery Road	London United Busways

Public Transport in Pinner is governed by Transport for London.

=== Cycling ===
The Metropolitan Quietway Cycle Route runs through Pinner, as well as street-running cycle lanes on Pinner Road and Eastcote Road.

=== Walking Trails ===
The Celandine Route from West Drayton terminates at Pinner Memorial Park.

== Heritage ==
=== Harrow Heritage Plaques ===
The brown plaques are awarded by the Harrow Heritage Trust, who secure the protection, preservation, restoration and improvement of the character and amenities of the London Borough of Harrow.

- Queen's Head Public House on the High Street.
- Wax Well on Waxwell Lane.
- Elthorne Gate on the High Street.
- Grim's Dyke on Montesole Playing Fields.
- Pinner House on Church Lane.
- Pinner Hill Farm on Pinner Hill Road.

=== English Heritage Plaques ===
London's blue plaques scheme, run by English Heritage, celebrates the links between notable figures of the past and the buildings in which they lived and worked.

- Sir Ambrose Heal (1872–1959), "Furniture Designer and Retailer lived here 1901–1917", The Fives Court, Moss Lane
- W. Heath Robinson (1872–1944), "Illustrator and comic artist lived here 1913–1918", 75 Moss Lane

=== Architecture ===
The architecture in Pinner has evolved greatly over the centuries. The majority of the architecture is conserved by private residents or by Harrow council's Conservation Team.

Norman, Gothic and Tudor architecture (1066–1603)

- Church of St John the Baptist on Church Lane

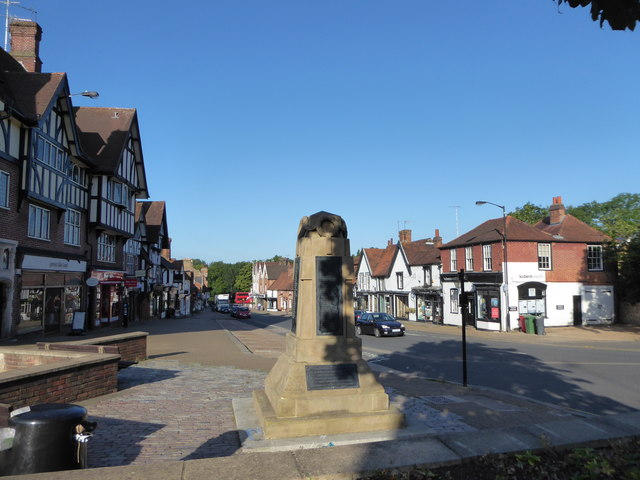
High Street

- Shops and Restaurants on the High Street
- Cottages and Farmhouse on Waxwell Lane
- Dwellings on Moss Lane

Georgian architecture (1714–1811)

- Pinner House on Church Lane

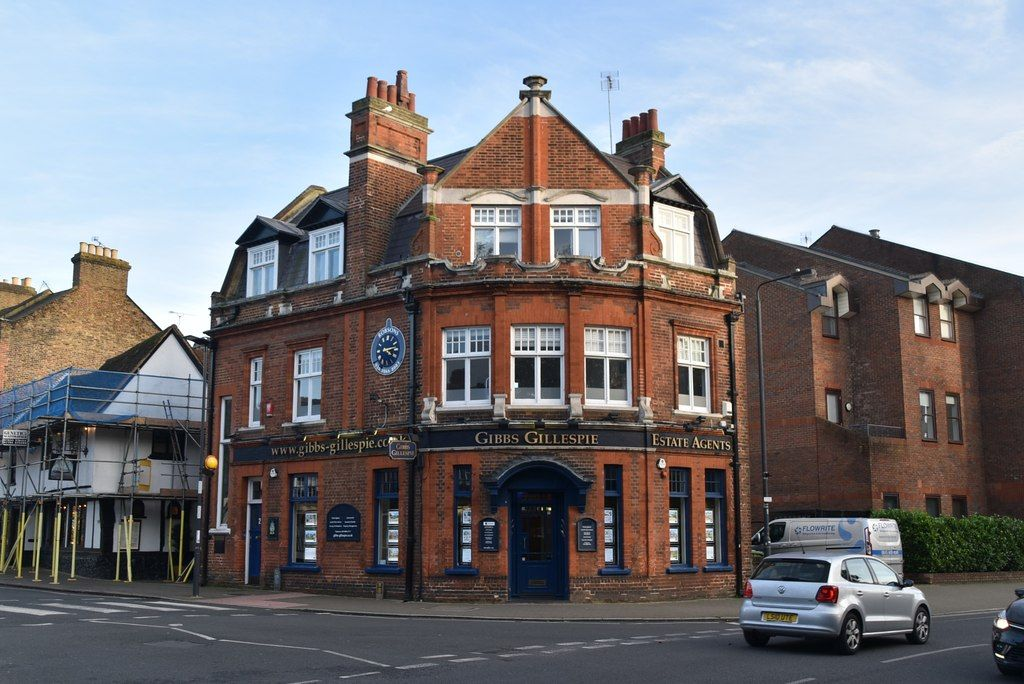
Estate agent at the corner of High Street

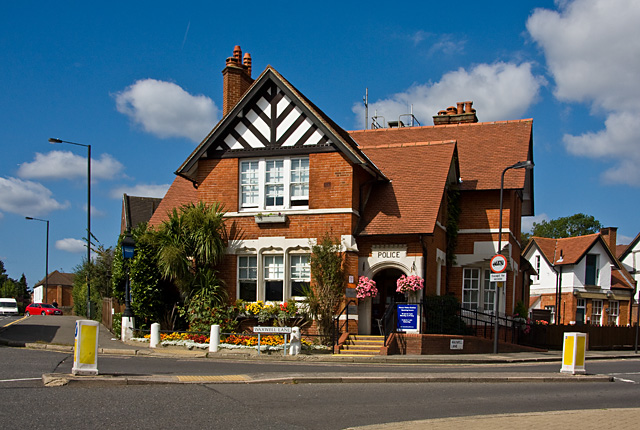
Pinner Police Station, Waxwell Lane

- Shops, Restaurants and Public Houses on the High Street
- Pinner Park Farm House on George V Avenue
- Former Granary at Harrow Museum, originally located at Pinner Park Farm

Victorian architecture (1837–1901)

- Pinner Station on Station Approach
- Pinner Police Station on Elm Park Road

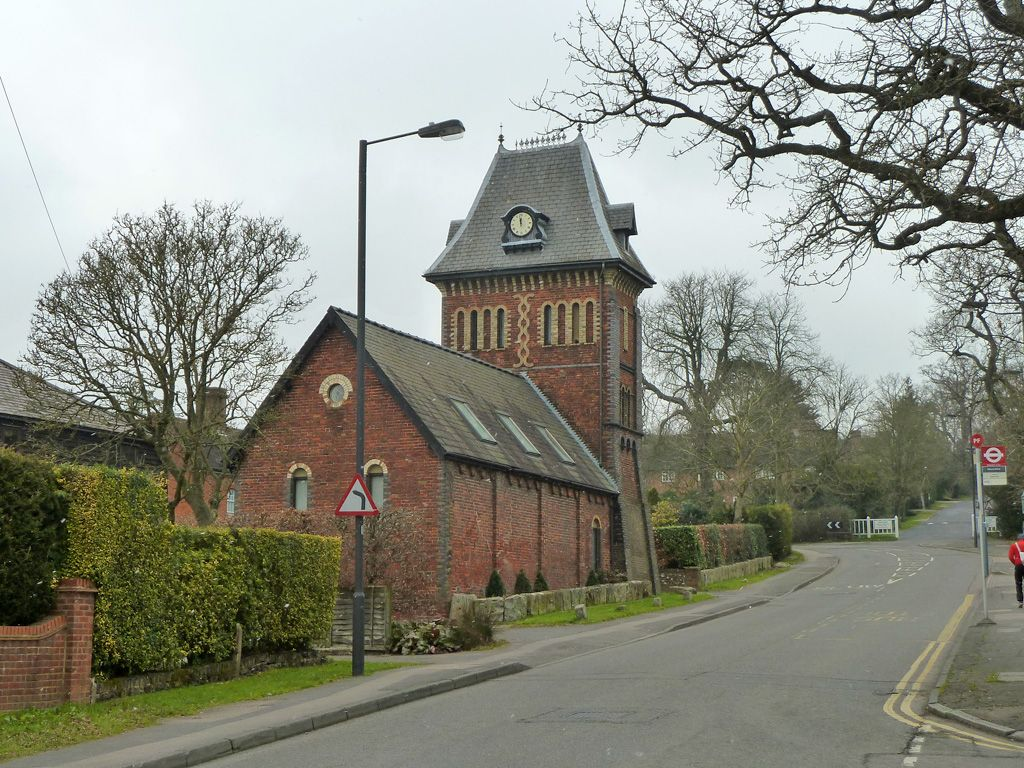
Tooke's Folly at Pinner Hill Farm, c. 1862

- Pinner Hill Farm on Pinner Hill Road
- Pinner Hill Golf Club House on South View Road

Metro-land architecture (1903–1939)

- Suburban prototypes on Cecil Park Estate
- Tudor revival dwellings on Grange Estate
- Arts and Crafts dwellings on Pinnerwood Park Estate
- Cottages on Elm Park Road

Art Deco architecture (1919–1939)

- Elm Park Court on Elm Park Road
- Pinner Court on Pinner Road
- Harrow Fire Station on Pinner Road
- Pinner Wood School on Latimer Gardens

Modern architecture (1945–1980)

- Roman Catholic Church of St Luke on Love Lane
- Shops on Bishops Walk
- Shops on Barters Walk
- Dwellings on Nursery Road

Postmodern architecture (1980–present)

- Heath Robinson Museum in Pinner Memorial Park
- Dwellings on Caulfield Gardens
- Nursery in Montesole Playing Fields
- Flats on Marsh Road

== See also ==
- Church of St John the Baptist
- Pinner House
- Pinner Underground Station
- Metro-land
- Heath Robinson Museum
