= 1894 Hendon Rural District Council election =

1894 UK local government election

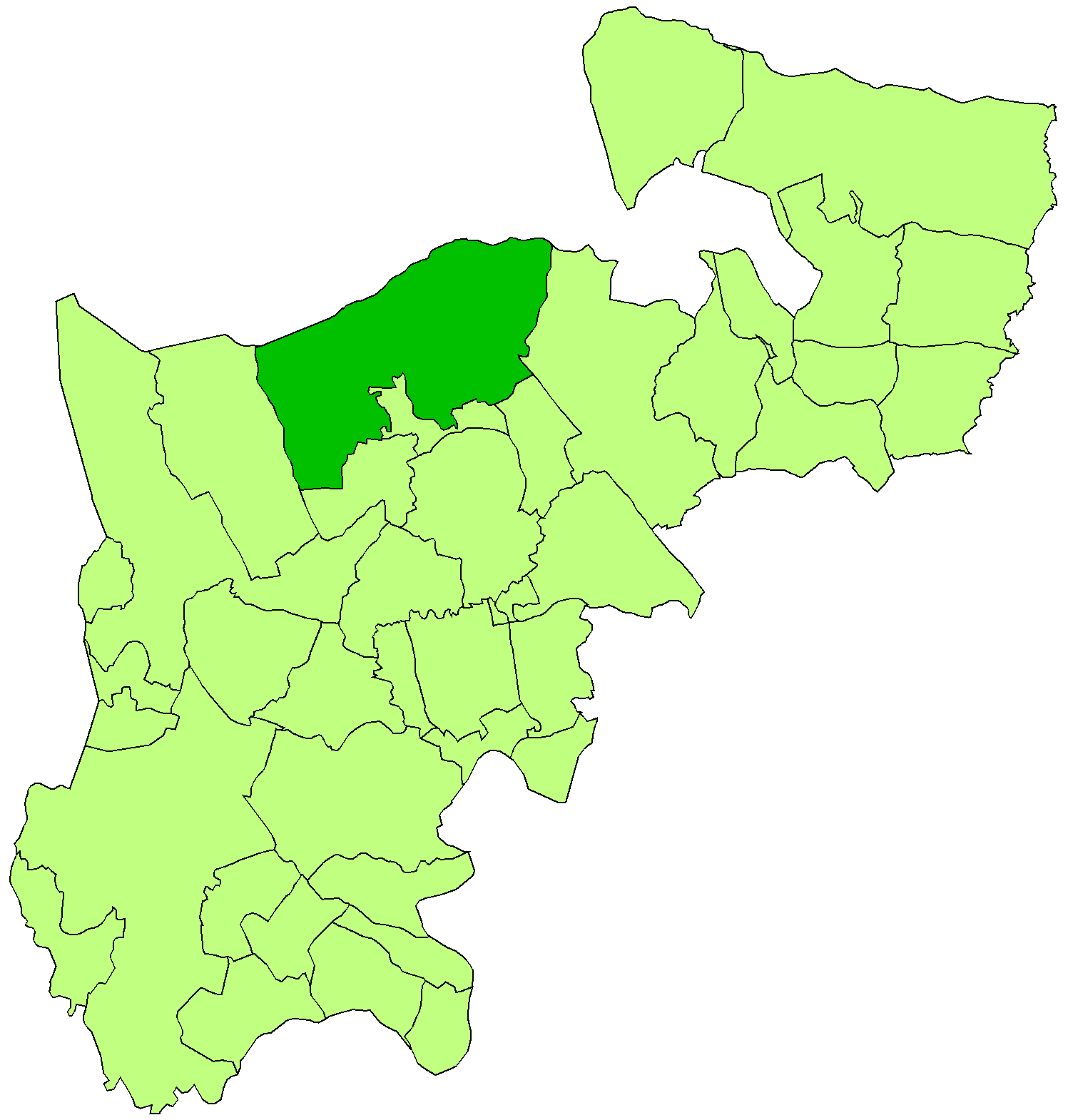
Hendon within Middlesex.

The 1894 Hendon Rural District Council election took place in December 1894 to elect members of Hendon Rural District Council in London, England. The council had been created under the Local Government Act 1894 (56 & 57 Vict. c. 73), and the whole council was up for election.

== Election and ward results ==
Hendon Rural District Council 3 seats Electorate: 533
Party	Candidate	Votes	%	±%
Independent	Augustus J.S. Eck	232		
Independent	Arthur Helsham-Jones	149		
Independent	Samuel H. Gladstone	142		
Independent	William Pendry	100		
Independent	George C. Ellement	72		
Independent	Frederick Dunbar Thomas	71		
Turnout		766		
Independent gain from		Swing		
Independent gain from		Swing		
