= Harrow Weald Common =

Nature reserve in Harrow Weald, Greater London, England

Coordinates: 51.624°N 0.346°W

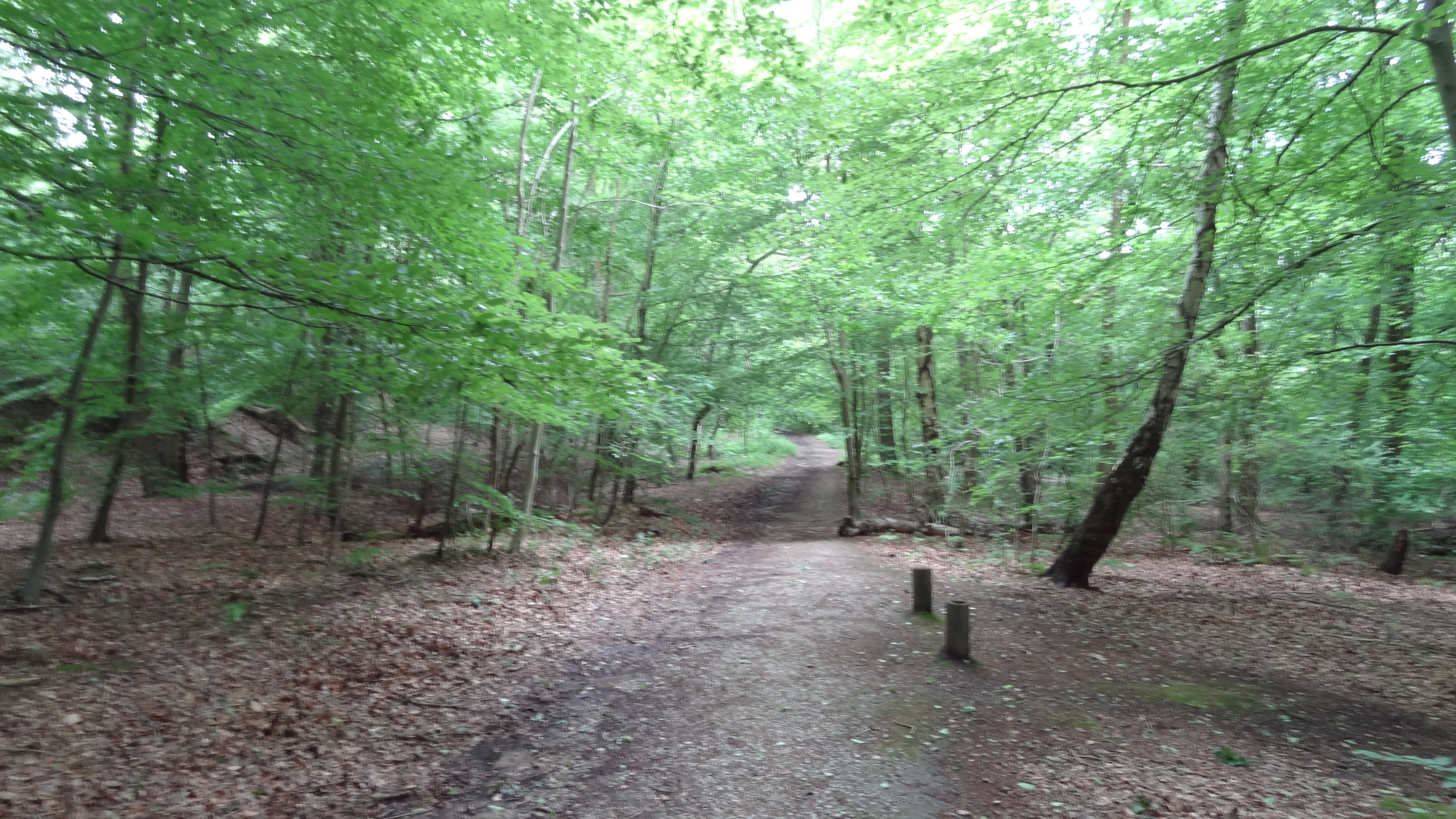
Path in Harrow Weald Common

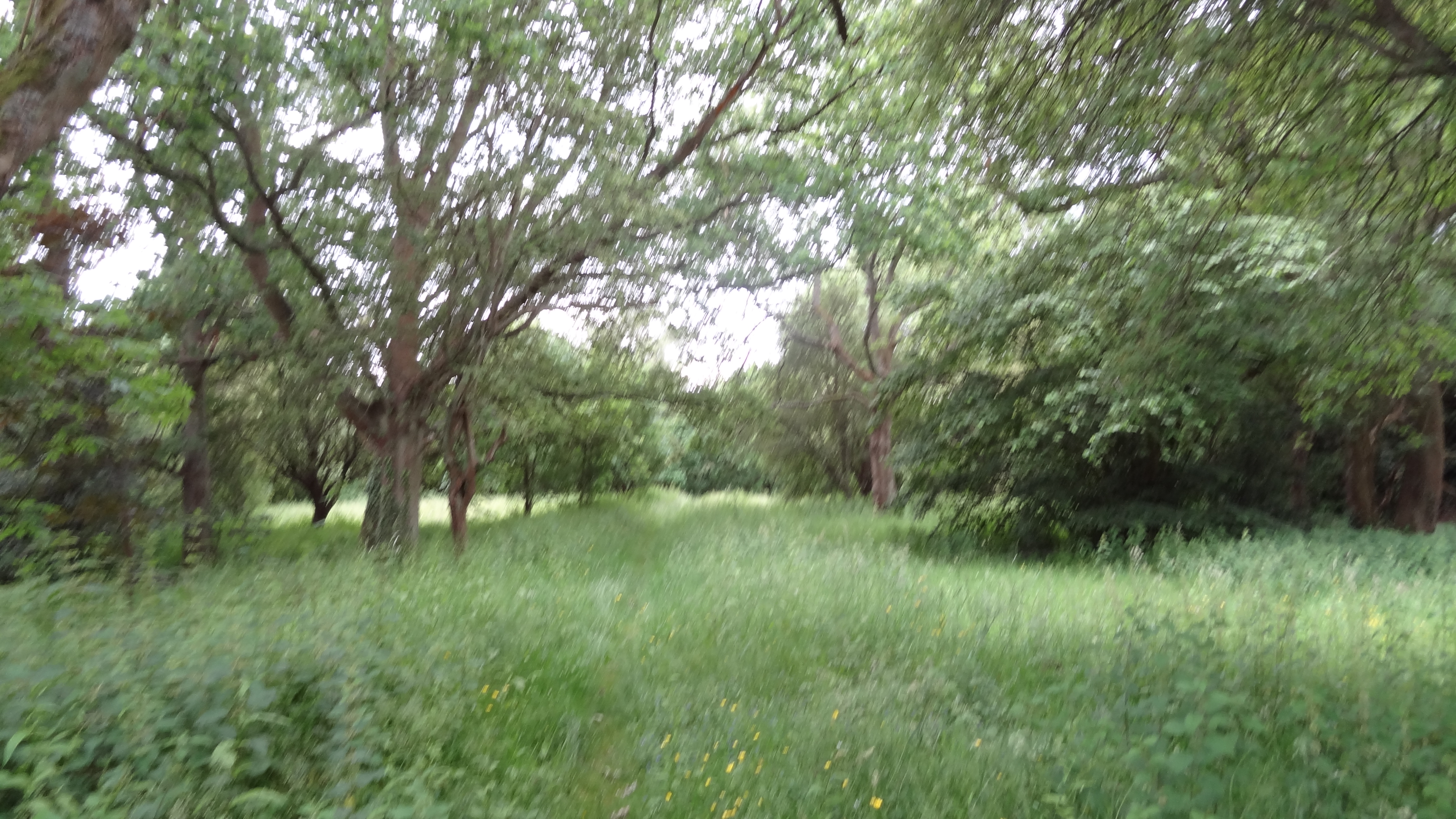
Pasture area south of the road called 'Old Redding'

Harrow Weald Common is an 18-hectare area of woodland, heath and pasture in Harrow Weald in the London Borough of Harrow. It is considered of considerable importance for wildlife, and it was formerly part of the Stanmore and Harrow Weald Commons and Bentley Priory Site of Special Scientific Interest, but in 1987 the boundaries of the SSSI were revised to exclude the Common. It has been designated by the Mayor of London as a Site of Metropolitan Importance for Nature Conservation.

== History ==
Metropolitan Commons (Harrow Weald) Supplemental Act 1899
- Act of Parliament
- Parliament of the United Kingdom
- Long title: An Act to confirm a Scheme relating to Harrow Weald Common in the Parish of Harrow Weald in the County of Middlesex.
- Citation: 62 & 63 Vict. c. xxxvii

Dates
- Royal assent: 20 June 1899

Text of statute as originally enacted

The word weald is derived from Old English wald, a wooded upland. Harrow Weald Common is one of the remnants of the once extensive Forest of Middlesex. In the 18th century it was a haunt of highwaymen. Following the inclosure acts, one of the rights granted to the commoners was gravel extraction, and this took place on a large scale in the 19th century. In the 1880s there was an attempt to get government agreement to the sale of the Common, but a successful campaign to oppose this was supported by W. S. Gilbert, who lived locally at a house called Grim's Dyke. The Metropolitan Commons (Harrow Weald) Supplemental Act 1899 (62 & 63 Vict. c. xxxvii) revoked most of the rights of the commoners and a board of Conservators was set up to manage the Common.

Harrow Weald Common is common land, and in 1965 it was placed under the protection of Harrow Council. In 1973, the Chief Commons Commissioner determined that there was no known owner of the land. The Harrow Weald Common Conservators are now a friends group which manage the site.

== The site ==
The site includes Grims' Dyke Open Space. Grim's Dyke or Grim's Ditch is an ancient earthwork which runs for three miles between Harrow Weald Common and Pinner Green. Its purpose is unknown, and it may date from the fifth or sixth centuries. Adjacent to the site are the City Open Space, Harrow Weald SSSI, a geological Site of Special Scientific Interest, and Bentley Priory Nature Reserve, a biological SSSI.

There is access from Common Road and Old Redding.

== See also ==
- Harrow parks and open spaces
