= Headstone Manor and Museum =

History museum in England

Headstone Museum
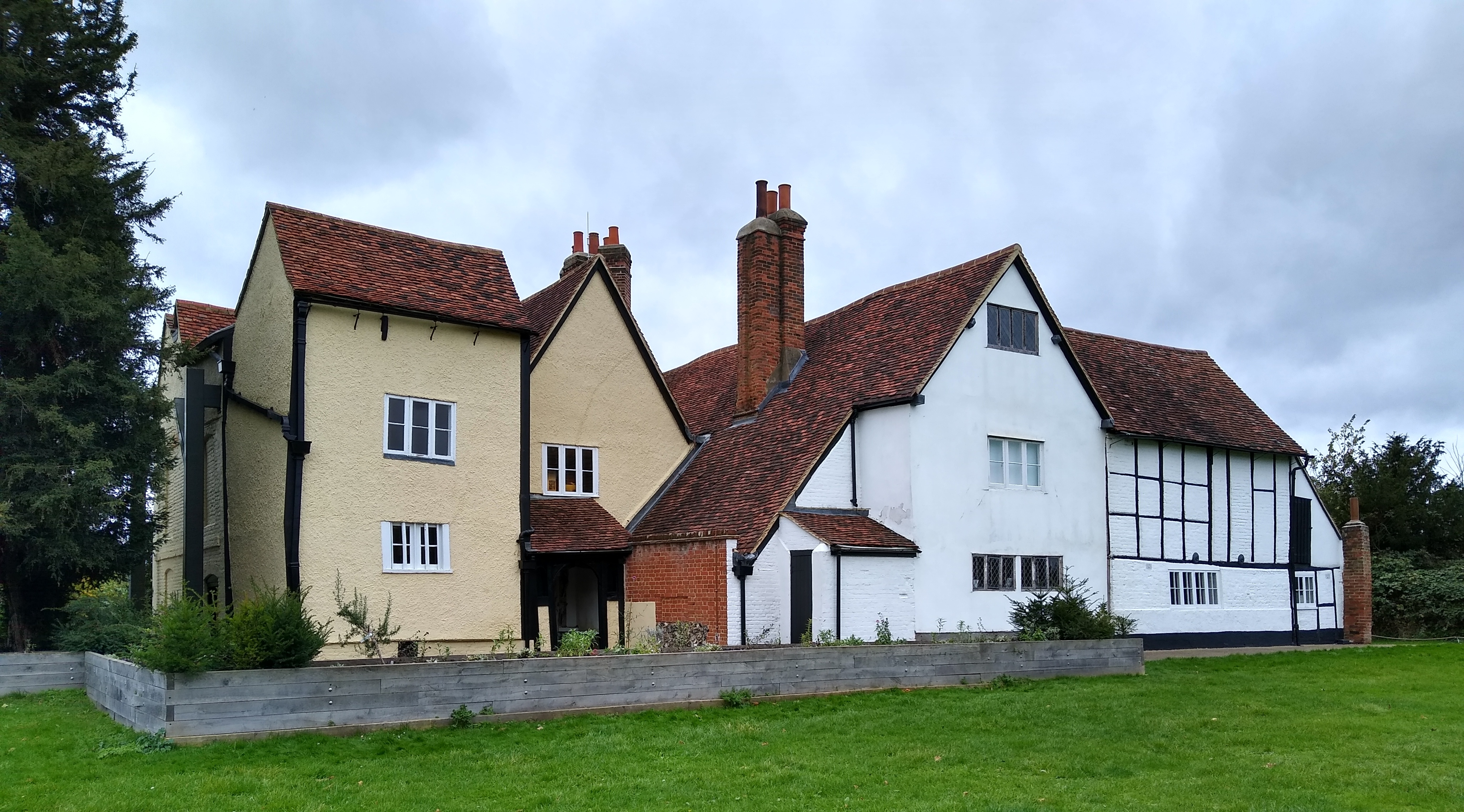
- The manor house
- Established: 1986
- Location: London Borough of Harrow
- Coordinates: 51°35′40″N 0°21′18″W
- Type: Local History
- Key holdings: Manor house; Two medieval barns; Granary
- Collection size: 15,000
- Public transit access: Headstone Lane station; Lioness line
- Parking: Pinner View

The Headstone Museum, also known as the Harrow Museum, is the local history museum for the London Borough of Harrow in England.

== Overview ==
The museum was established in 1986 and is located in the grounds of Headstone Manor, itself situated within Headstone Manor Park. All the buildings are individually listed, and the site as a whole is a scheduled monument. It tells the story of Harrow through its collections, exhibitions and four historic buildings, detailing the significance of the site in which it is set as well as the people and wider area.

== Historic buildings ==
=== Headstone Manor ===
Built in 1310, the moated manor house known as Headstone Manor is the earliest surviving timber-framed building in Middlesex. Described as "one of the most interesting domestic complexes in the whole country", the fabric of Headstone Manor contains examples of work dating from the 14th, 17th and 18th centuries. Headstone Manor is a Grade I listed building.

There is evidence that the land on which Headstone Manor stands was in use during the Roman period. It is reported to have belonged to Wulfred, Archbishop of Canterbury in 822AD having been bought as part of wider attempts to restore lands, taken by a Mercian King, to the Church.

The construction of Headstone Manor began in c.1310, as revealed by the dendrochronological dating of the building's oldest timbers. John de Stratford, Archbishop of Canterbury, purchased even more land around the site in 1344 and used the site as his main residence in Middlesex. Headstone Manor remained in the ownership of the Archbishops of Canterbury until 1546, when it was surrendered to Henry VIII. Soon after, Henry VIII sold it to one of his court favourites, Edward North, and it remained in private ownership for almost four centuries and was primarily occupied by tenant farmers.

The numerous owners of Headstone Manor made dramatic extensions and changes to the building, such as adding extra wings and changing the appearance of the interior and exterior of the house. Examples of this include the panelling of the great hall in 1631, and the addition of a fashionable brick façade in the 1770s, which gives Headstone Manor the appearance it has today.

The house is surrounded by a bridged moat, which is still filled with water and which is believed to be the only surviving filled moat in Middlesex. It was constructed as a status symbol to reflect the wealth of the Manor's owner.

Over time, Headstone Manor fell into a state of disrepair, and much of its surrounding land was sold off. In 1925 Hendon Rural District Council bought the site. It then passed into the control of the London Borough of Harrow after local government reorganisation. After years of increasing dilapidation, the decision was made to turn the site into the home of Harrow Museum, which officially opened in 1986. The first stage of restoration at Headstone Manor began in the autumn of 2004, focusing on the oldest parts of the building.

=== The Great Barn ===
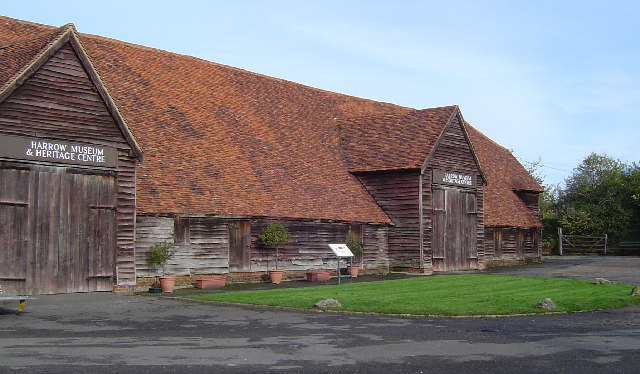
The Tithe Barn at the museum

Headstone Manor was a working farm, and consequently was surrounded by many ancient farm buildings. By the early 20th century, the majority of these buildings had fallen into a state of disrepair and were eventually destroyed. Only two remain, and by far the most impressive is the farm building now known as the Great Barn (formerly referred to as the Tithe Barn).

Built in 1506 on the orders of the then Archbishop of Canterbury, the Grade II* listed Great Barn has a framework made entirely from English Oak, measuring an impressive 43 metres long and nine metres high. Originally, the Barn would have been mainly used by the tenant farmer of Headstone to store grains and stable horses, with a few bays reserved for the use of the Archbishop. Despite its previous name, it was never used to store tithes.

By the 1920s, the Barn was in a very poor condition. It was not until a major restoration project carried out by the London Borough of Harrow in the 1970s that the Great Barn was bought back to its former state of glory. The Great Barn was converted to provide the facilities needed for an active museum. The resulting rich brown weather-boarded building with ancient tiled roof formed the first usable building of Harrow Museum when it opened in 1986.

In 2014 a programme of restoration began, initially transforming the Great Barn into a function space.

=== The Small Barn ===
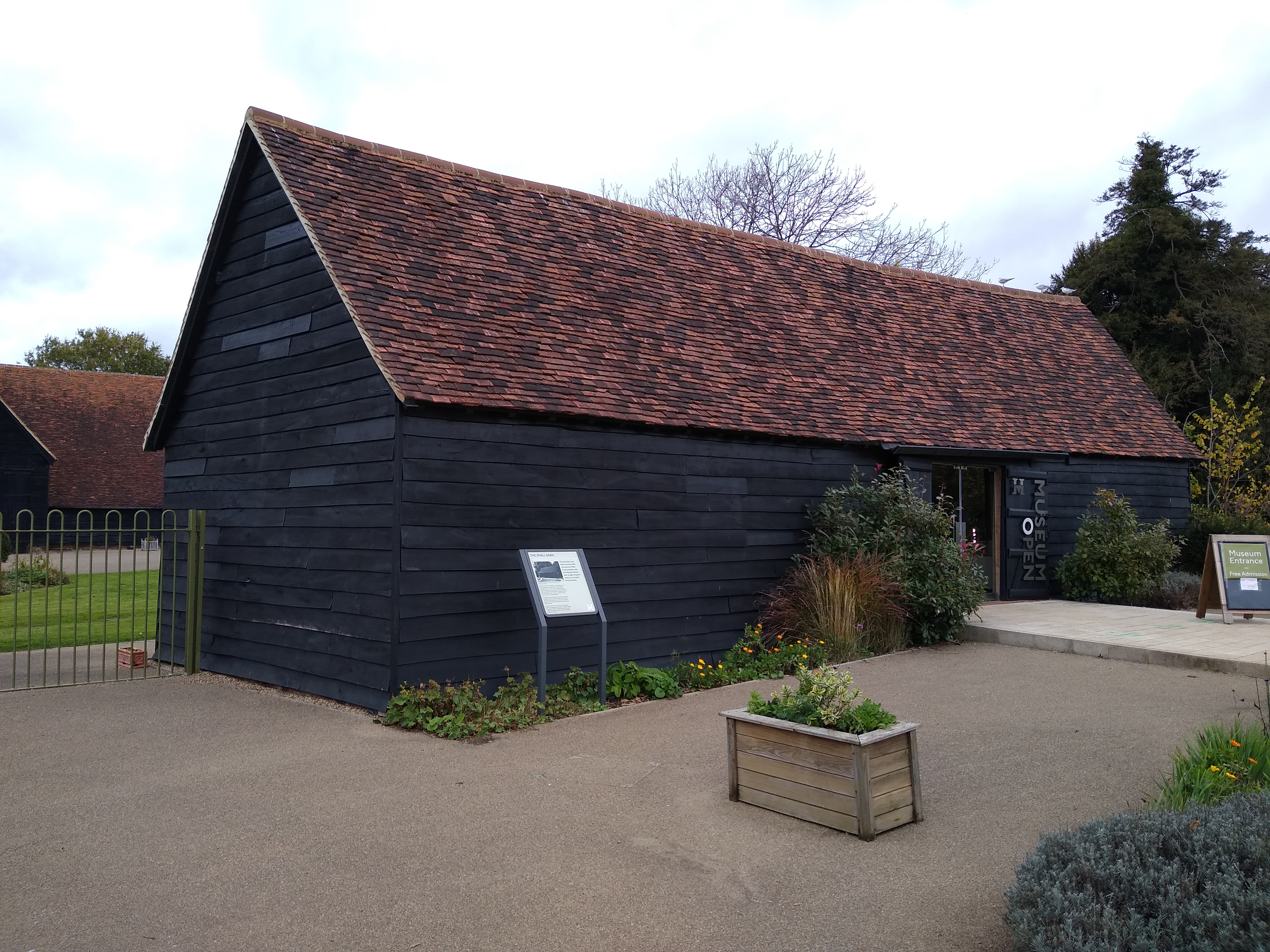
The Small Barn

Excavations at the site of the Small Barn have revealed fragments of prehistoric and Roman pottery, indicating that the site of that is now Harrow Museum was inhabited thousands of years ago. Archaeological excavation has also shown that the foundations of the Small Barn date back to the 14th century, making it contemporary with the first phases of the building of Headstone Manor house and the moat.

The Small Barn stands opposite the giant Great Barn, and originally would have been two buildings standing end to end. Re-roofed as one with a drainage channel through the middle, it is likely to have been used to house livestock. It is thought that a series of structures have stood on the site, though most of the wood today appear to be from the same period as the early 16th century Great Barn.

In the mid-1970s, the Small Barn was almost destroyed by a fire. After 20 years being covered by a protective plastic canopy, the burnt out skeleton of the building was finally restored. The Small Barn is a Grade II listed building and re-opened in autumn 2017, with archaeological exhibitions and a film.

=== The Granary ===
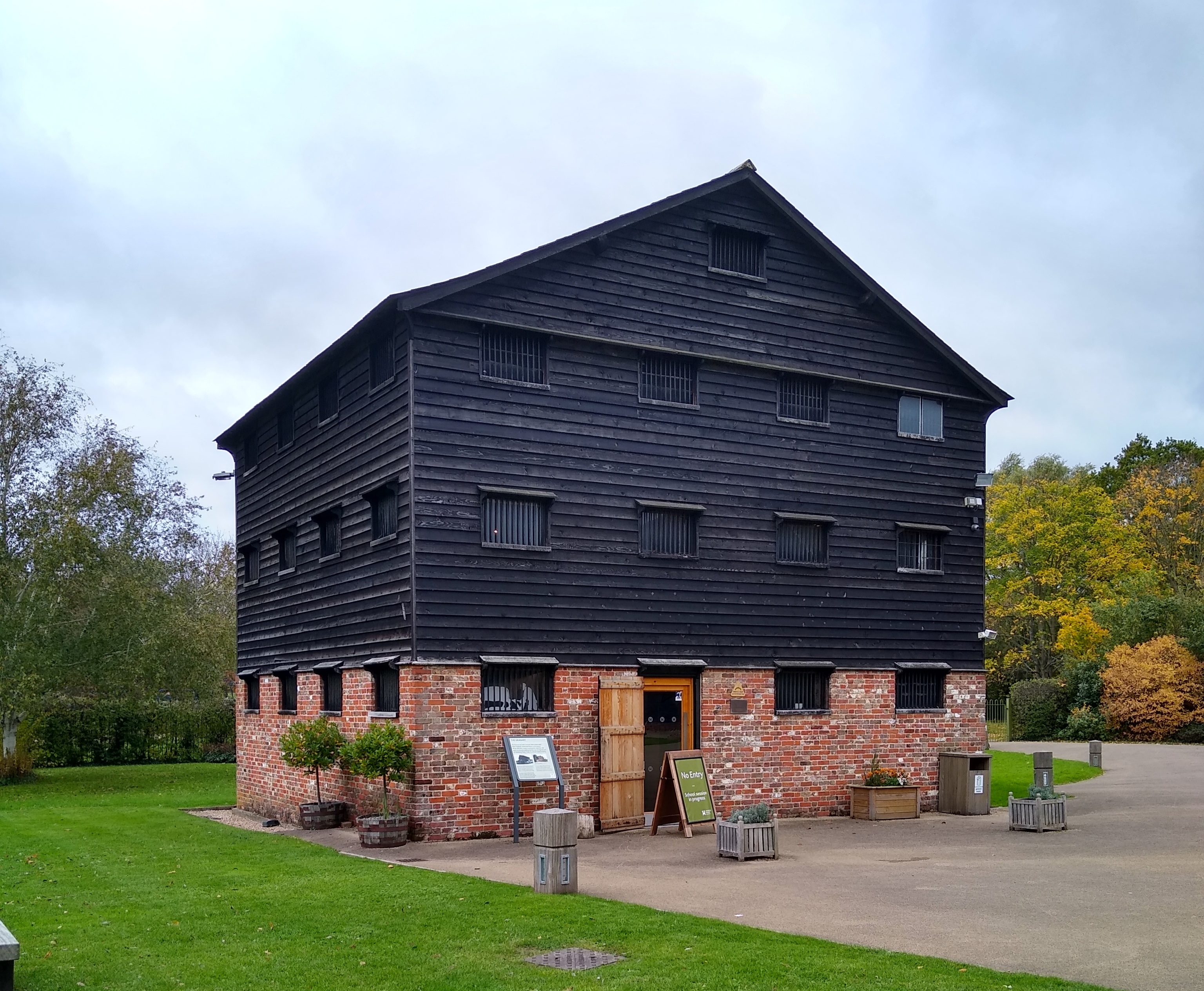
The Granary

The Grade II listed Granary is the only museum structure that was not originally built as one of the farm buildings of Headstone Manor, having been originally constructed about a mile away in Pinner Park Farm. After becoming redundant and falling into a dilapidated condition it was carefully restored, before being moved to the Harrow Museum site in 1991.

Dating from the late 18th century, the Granary was actually a cattle feed store. Although it only has a ground floor and a first floor, the building has an extraordinary number of windows to the upper stories, making it a rather puzzling building. Originally the building would have been longer, but one end stood in damp ground and rotted away, reducing the Granary to its present size.

The Granary building fits well into the context of the Harrow Museum site. It was opened to the public in 1992, and re-opened as a learning space after Heritage Lottery Fund restoration works in autumn 2017.

== Additional facilities ==
=== The Moat Café and Visitor Centre ===
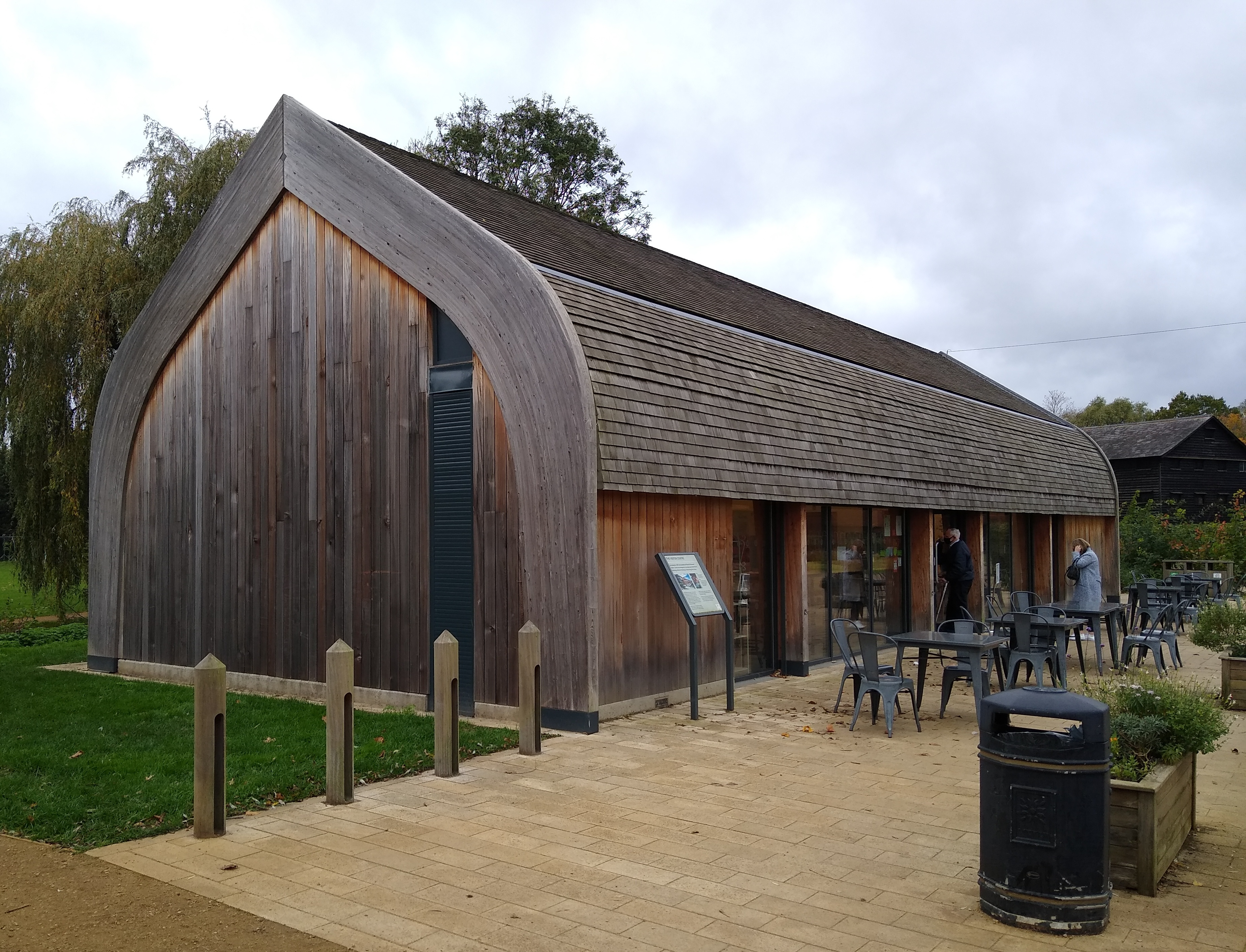
Visitor Centre

Located near The Small Barn, The Moat Café and Visitor Centre is where freshly ground coffee, cakes, paninis and other hot snacks are available. The Visitor Centre also houses a gift shop, with a range of handcrafted pieces including jewellery, books and children's gifts. The Visitor Centre also contains a disabled toilet and baby changing facilities. The Moat café and visitor centre is open every day except Mondays.

=== Car park ===
There is a free car park in Pinner View, 100 m (330 ft) from the entrance gate of the museum.

=== Cycling ===
There are several different bike racks by the car park and the Headstone Recreation entrances to the museum.

== Collections ==
As a local history museum, the Harrow Museum Collection is made up of over 15,000 objects and artefacts that are linked to the Harrow area. The Collection focuses on the social and industrial past of Harrow and its residents, including an extensive collection from the Eastman Kodak factory, the Whitefriars Glass factory, and the Hamilton paint factory. In addition, Harrow Museum has an extensive collection of archaeological objects, ranging from pre-history to the recent past.

== See also ==
- Grade I and II* listed buildings in Harrow
