= Pinner House =

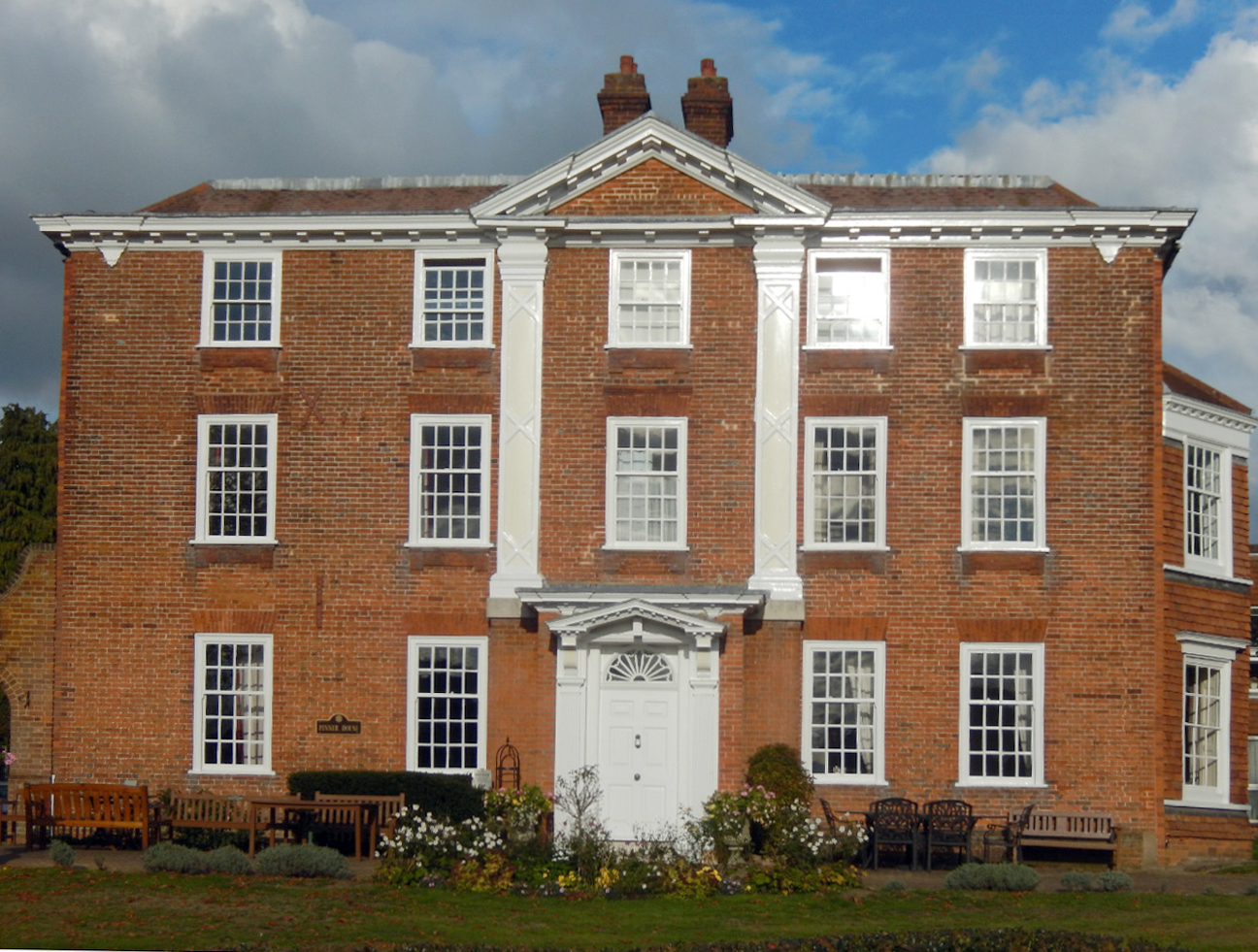
- Pinner House, 2018

- Location within London Borough of Harrow

General information
- Type: Mansion
- Location: Church Lane, Pinner, England
- Coordinates: 51.59390°N 0.37814°W

Design and construction
- Designations: Grade II* listed

Pinner House is a Grade II* listed mansion in Pinner, Middlesex. Its façade was built in 1721, but the rest of the building was constructed at some point earlier that century. It was extended during the 20th century, and has been used as an old people's home since the 1930s.

== History and description ==
Pinner House is a brick building decorated with pilasters. The façade was built in 1721, but the rest of the house dates from earlier that century. It was one of several mansions built in Pinner, and is one of only two such buildings to survive, the other being Pinner Hill. The rear of Pinner House was extended in 1977 using materials similar to the original construction. The building is located on Church Lane, near to St John the Baptist church.

The building was designated Grade II* listed on 21 September 1951. A plaque to commemorate the building was placed outside it by Harrow Heritage Trust in 2001.

== Occupancy ==
During the mid-19th century the building was used as a school for children, called Pinner House Academy. It was sold by auction in 1829 with the usage suggested as a family home. It was sold once again in 1911. During the First World War, Pinner House was owned by Mr and Mrs George Neal, whose eldest son was killed in action on the Western Front on 15 June 1915. It was sold again in 1920. It remained as a family home, and was owned by Mr and Mrs George Glanfield at least between 1924 and 1938. Glanfield was a wholesale clothier, and owned the company G. Glanfield and Son, which held the contract for clothing the British Army during World War I. He died in 1938, and the building has been used as an old people's home since that period, but has been sold at least once in that usage.
