= Harrow Weald =

Suburban district in London, England

Coordinates: 51.604°N 0.339°W

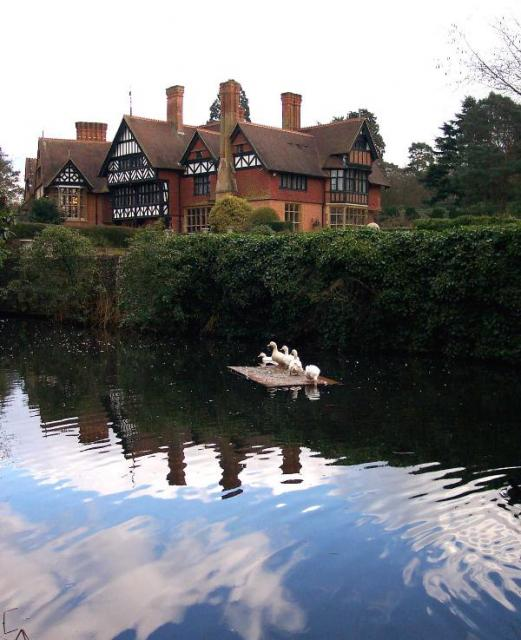
- Grim's Dyke and Grimstone Lake

- Location within Greater London
- Population: 11,376 (2011 Census. Ward)
- OS grid reference: TQ151907
- London borough: Harrow
- Ceremonial county: Greater London
- Region: London
- Country: England
- Sovereign state: United Kingdom
- Post town: HARROW
- Postcode district: HA3
- Dialling code: 020
- Police: Metropolitan
- Fire: London
- Ambulance: London
- UK Parliament: Harrow East
- London Assembly: Brent and Harrow

Harrow Weald is a suburban district in Greater London, England. Located about 2 miles (3.2 km) north of Harrow, Harrow Weald is formed from a leafy 1930s suburban development along with ancient woodland of Harrow Weald Common. It forms part of the London Borough of Harrow.

Harrow Weald is bordered by Bushey Heath (north), Stanmore (west), Wealdstone (south), and is near to Headstone and Hatch End. It is in the HA postcode area.

== Etymology ==
The word Weald is Old English in origin, meaning woodland. It was recorded as waldis in 1303 and welde in 1382, but the name Harrow Weald is not recorded until 1553. It was then part of the great Forest of Middlesex.

== Geography and locale ==
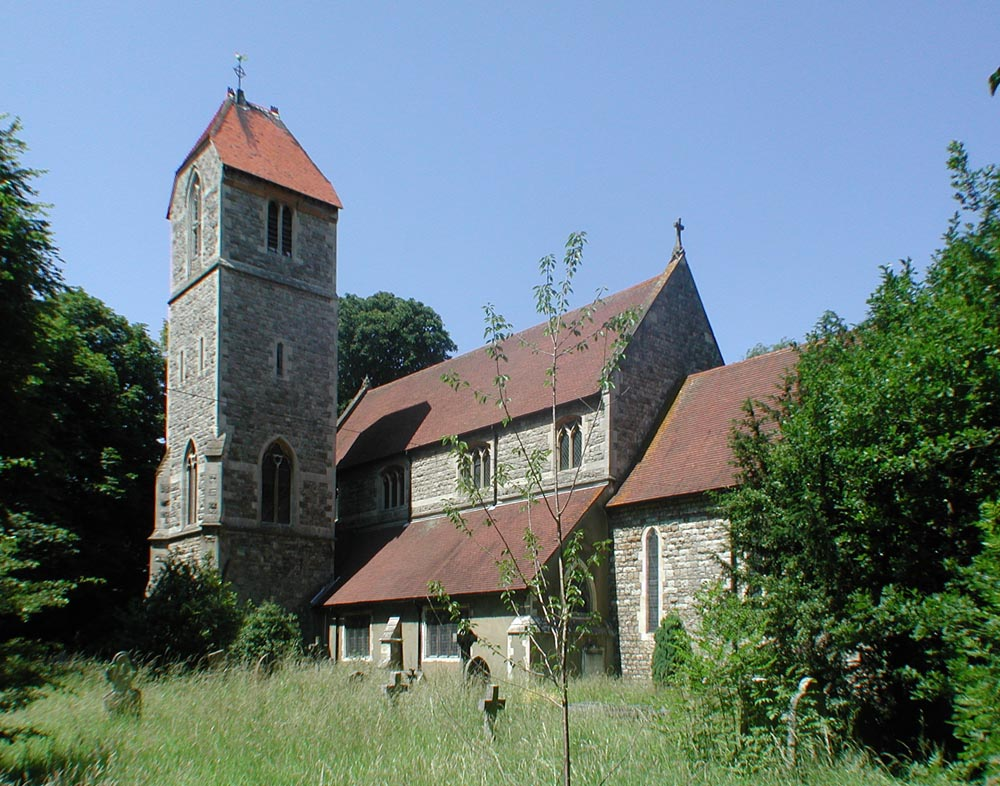
All Saints church

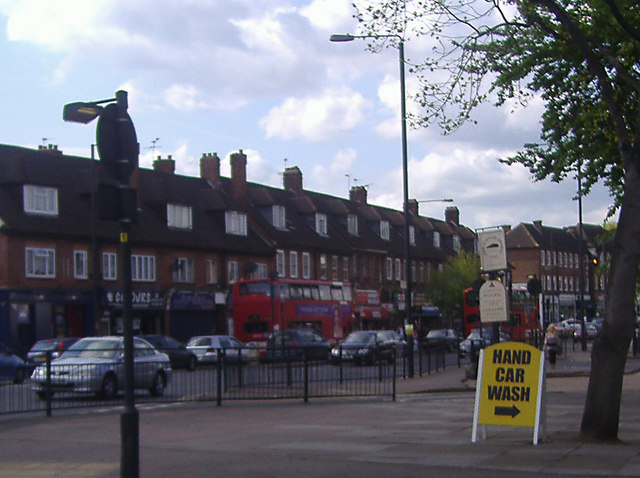
High Street

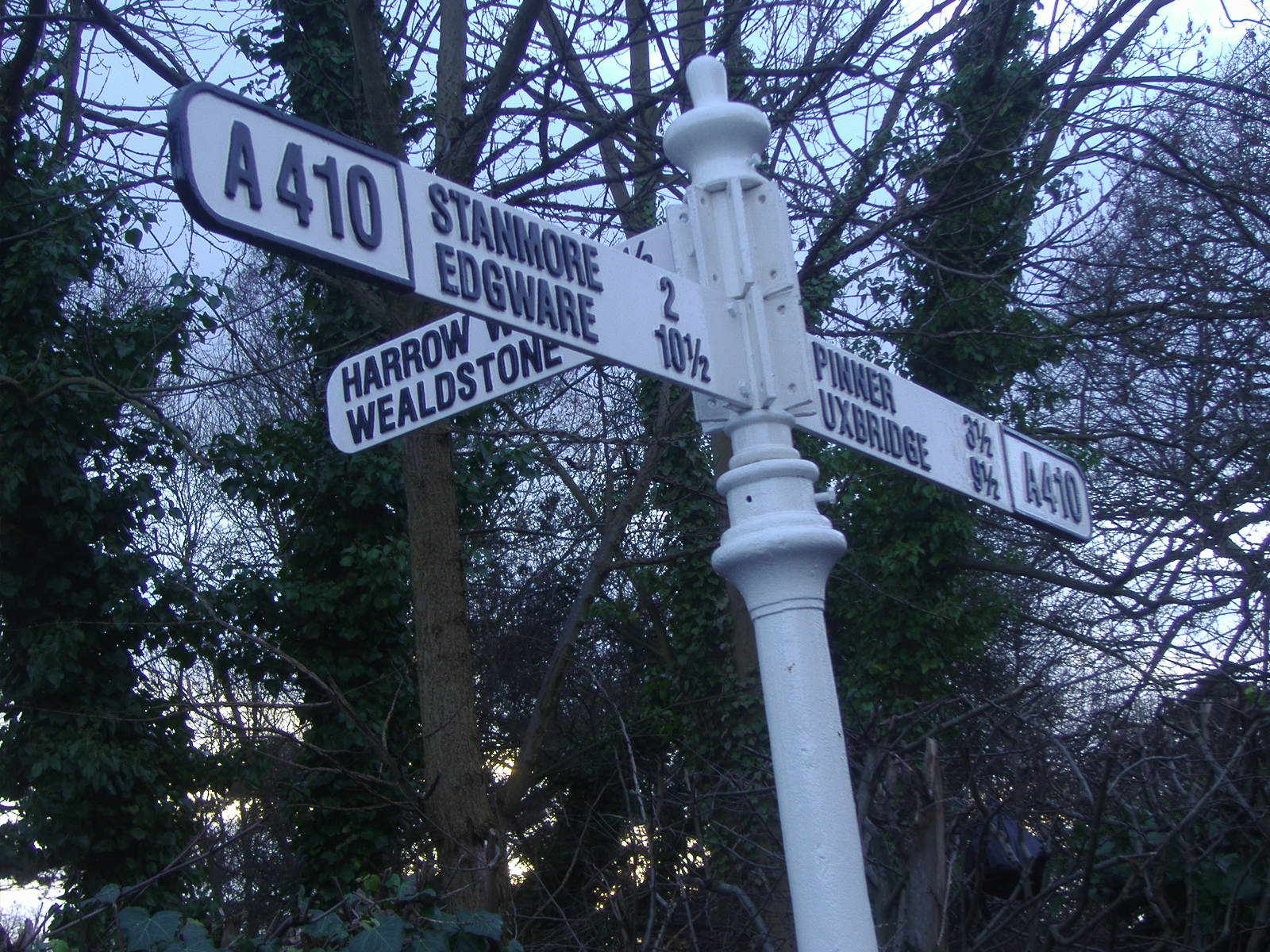
Old road signage at the A409/A410 roundabout

Ancient woodland on high ground fills most of the northern part of Harrow Weald on the border of Greater London (and the traditional county of Middlesex) with Hertfordshire. The area is one of the highest in Greater London; the highest point in Middlesex is near the woods at 502 feet (153 m). The eastern part of the woods merges into those of Stanmore and encompasses Bentley Priory. The priory's grounds are now Bentley Priory Nature Reserve, a biological Site of Special Scientific Interest. Along the southern edge of the high ground runs the road Old Redding and a car park here gives views over parts of London. The western part of the woodland forms Harrow Weald Common, which adjoins Harrow Weald SSSI, a geological Site of Special Scientific Interest. Other smaller woods surround the Grim's Dyke Hotel, the former country house of W. S. Gilbert. Gilbert and Sullivan's comic operas are frequently performed here. The house is named after the nearby earthwork Grim's Ditch, a 3-mile (4.8 km) long ancient monument that runs from Harrow Weald to Pinner Green. The monument remains largely mysterious but is known to have been named in the Saxon era. The ditch hints at a long history of habitation in the area and many artefacts have been found on the common to support this.

Boxtree Park Friends group is based at Harrow Weald Recreation Ground. It is run by a group of local volunteers who look after and maintain the park on behalf of the community and in collaboration with Harrow Council.

The south of the area is a suburban development with houses, schools, small shops, supermarkets and pubs (notably Bombay Central, formerly the Weald Stone Inn, and before that the Red Lion). The area expanded around the First World War and continued to grow quickly: the population grew from 1,517 in 1901 to 10,923 in 1931.

Harrow Weald was historically a chapelry in the ancient parish of Harrow-on-the-Hill, in 1894 Harrow Weald became a separate civil parish, being formed from part of Harrow on the Hill, on 1 April 1934 the parish was abolished to form Harrow.

The Harrow Weald campus of Harrow College (previously a grammar school, then a 16+ college) and Harrow Weald Cemetery are at the northern edge of the built up area. All Saints churchyard and its extension adjoin this cemetery and their most famous interment is of Leefe Robinson, a pilot who was awarded the Victoria Cross. Also buried at All Saints is the English-born Hollywood actor George Arliss (1868-1946), who won the Academy Award for Best Actor in 1930.

== Demography ==
The 2011 census showed that in the Harrow Weald ward, 53% of the population was white (41% British, 6% Other, 5% Irish). The largest non-white group was Indian at 19%. Of the 4,160 household tenures, 68.4% of them are owned, 15.9% are socially rented and 13.7% are privately rented. The unemployment rate of economically active people was 4.9%. The median age of the population is 39.

== Transport ==
There are no train stations in the centre of Harrow Weald, but Headstone Lane railway station is to the west, whereas Harrow & Wealdstone station is to the south.

=== Buses ===
London Bus routes 140, 182, 186, 258, 340, 640, H12, H18, H19 and N18 operate through the area. The N140 bus also goes through Harrow Weald, it was introduced on 17 June 1972.

== Governance ==
Harrow Weald is in the Harrow East constituency, represented by Conservative MP Bob Blackman. The Harrow Weald ward is represented by Conservative Cllrs Pritesh Patel, Cllr Stephen Greek and Cllr Ramji Chauhan who are members of Harrow London Borough Council.
