= Harrow Weald SSSI =

UK Site of Special Scientific Interest

Coordinates: 51.6233°N 0.3447°W

Harrow Weald
- Site of Special Scientific Interest
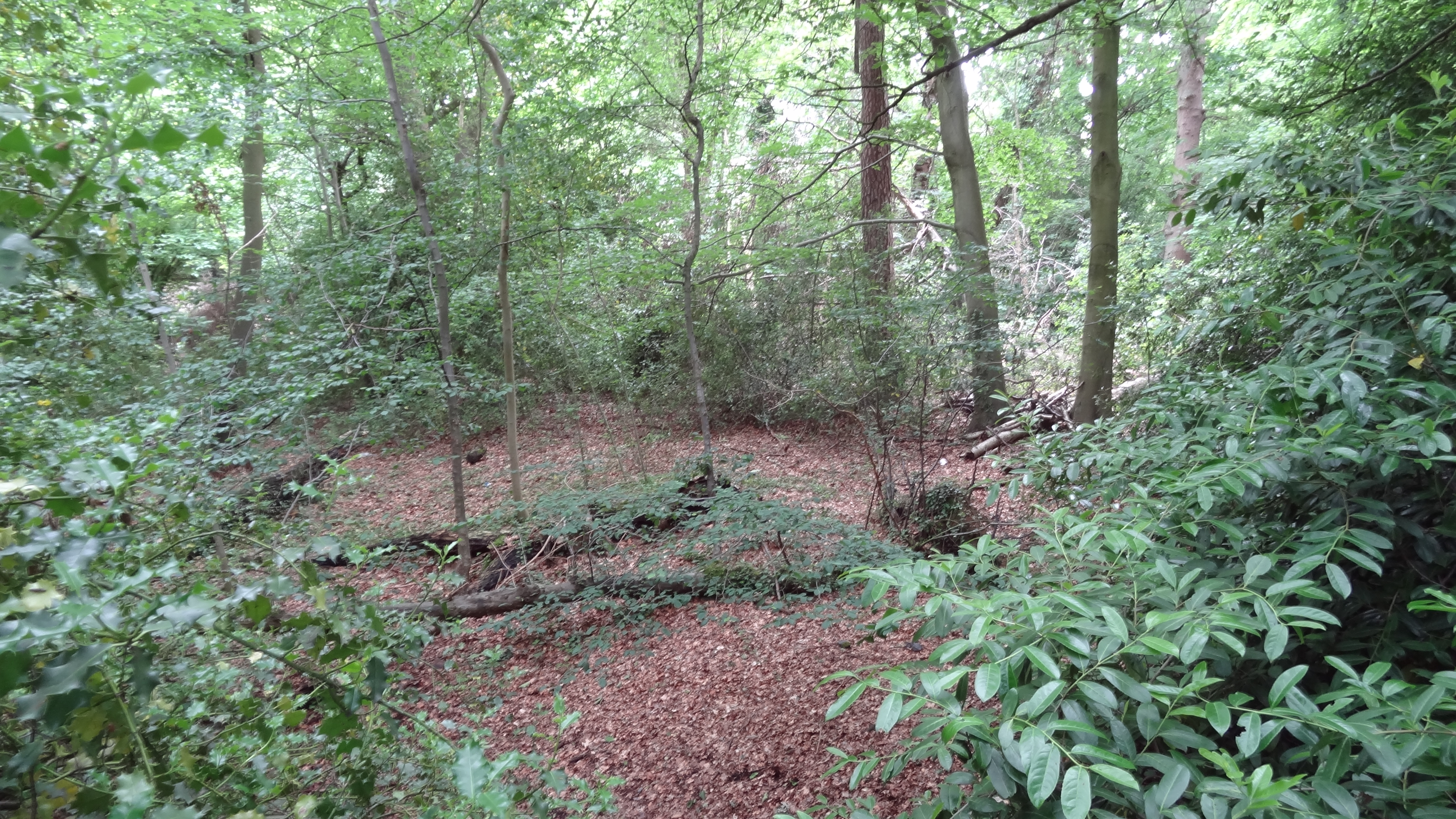
- Location of Harrow Weald.
- Area of search: Greater London
- Grid reference: TQ147929
- Interest: Geological
- Area: 3.7 ha (9.1 acres)
- Notification date: 1987
- Location map: Magic Map

Harrow Weald SSSI is a 3.7 hectare (9 acre) geological Site of Special Scientific Interest in Harrow Weald in the London Borough of Harrow. It was formerly part of the Stanmore and Harrow Weald Commons and Bentley Priory SSSI. It is a Geological Conservation Review site.

It provides the most complete exposure of Pleistocene gravel beds above the Claygate Beds, the youngest layer of London Clay. They were formerly thought to have been of marine origin but recent research has cast doubt on this view. It is considered a key site for further studies.

There is no public access but it can be viewed from Common Road and Harrow Weald Common.

== See also ==
- List of Sites of Special Scientific Interest in Greater London
