= Heath Robinson Museum =

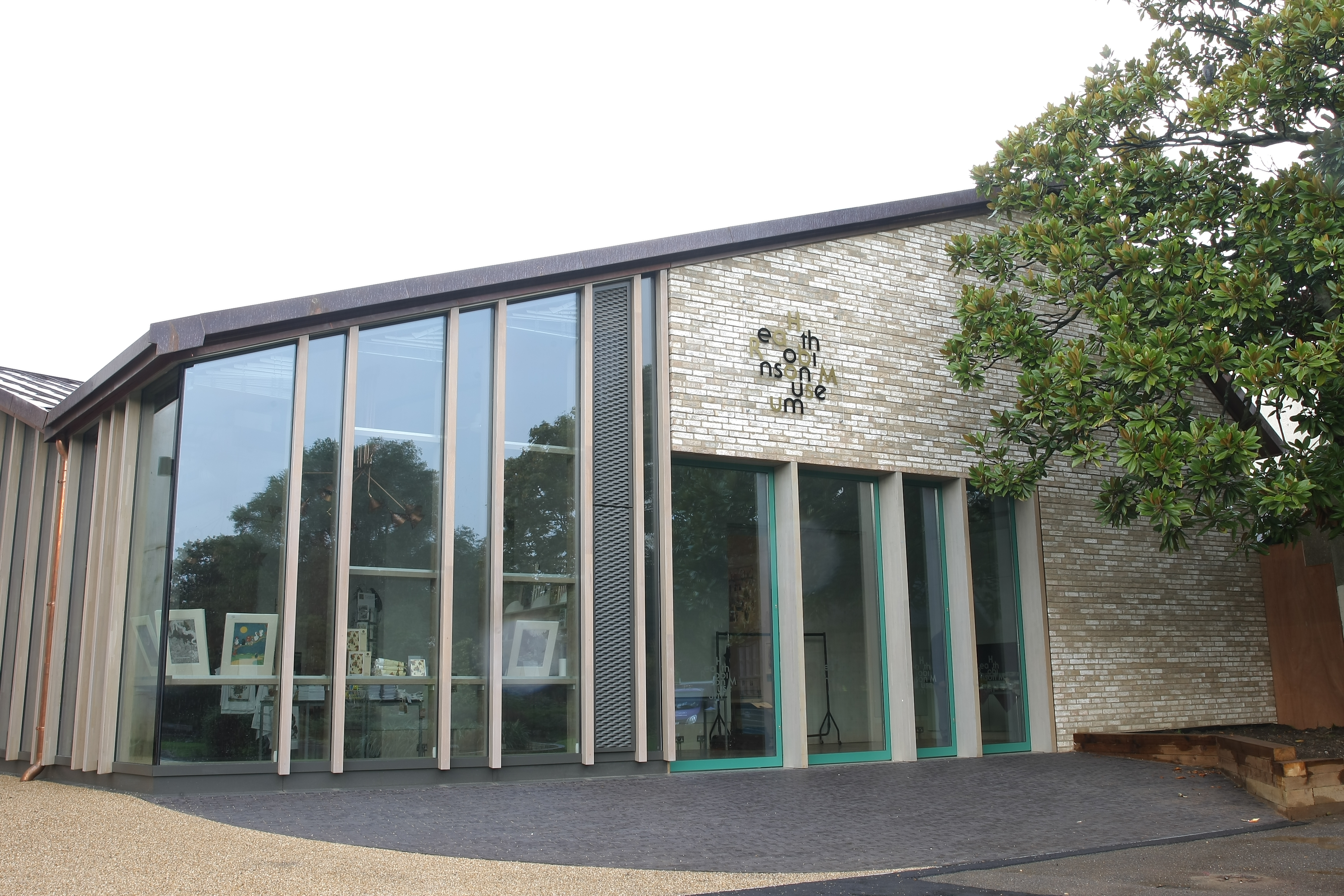

- Location within London Borough of Harrow
- Established: 15 October 2016; 9 years ago
- Location: 50 West End Lane, Pinner HA5 1AE, London
- Coordinates: 51°35′33″N 0°23′12″W
- Type: Art museum
- Website: www.heathrobinsonmuseum.org

The Heath Robinson Museum is a museum in Pinner, northwest London, dedicated to showcasing the work of the artist, illustrator, humorist and social commentator William Heath Robinson (1872–1944). The museum was officially opened by local author and children's writer Michael Rosen on 15 October 2016 at a ceremony attended by hundreds of people in Pinner Memorial Park. It was the first London museum in over 40 years to be purpose-built in Greater London.

== Foundation ==
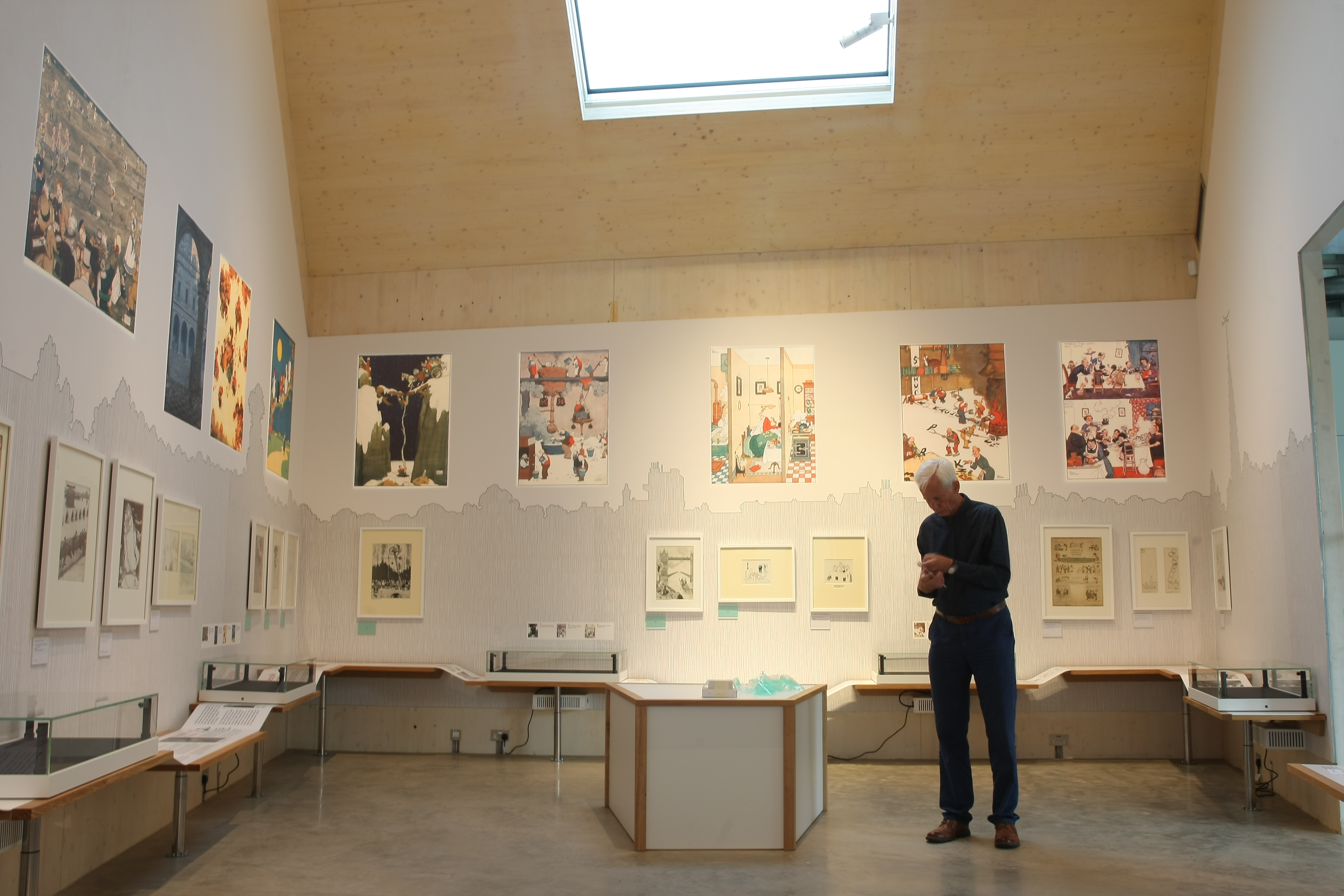
Heath Robinson Museum permanent exhibition gallery with curator Geoffrey Beare

The William Heath Robinson Trust ran a campaign to raise funds for the museum, which started in October 2013. The museum passed the first round of Heritage Lottery Funding in March 2012, which led to its receiving a £1.1 million grant in December 2013. Developed with funding from the Heritage Lottery Fund of £1.3m and substantial donations from local patrons, residents and businesses, the new museum features two galleries, a permanent display covering the career of W. Heath Robinson and his illustrations and artworks, as well as a special exhibition gallery that hosts a programme of themed exhibitions that change every three months. Pinner Memorial Park, Pinner in the London Borough of Harrow is close to Pinner tube station on the Metropolitan line.

The West House and Heath Robinson Museum Trust is a registered charity which restored West House in Pinner Memorial Park for community use. The Trust is a partnership between local Pinner people and the William Heath Robinson Trust, custodians of the artist’s work.

When Heath Robinson’s daughter Joan died, her husband wanted her collection of her father’s work to be kept in public ownership. As a result the William Heath Robinson Trust was formed in 1992. The original collection included about 500 pieces of original art work together with an archive of letters, association copies and special editions of the books that he illustrated, proof prints, advertising booklets and ephemera. The National Heritage Memorial Fund and the Art Fund grant-aided the William Heath Robinson Trust in 2015 to purchase some 400 additional important works for the Museum, bringing the collection to nearly 1,000. It is the only substantial collection of the artist’s work in public ownership.
