= Grim's Ditch (Harrow) =

Linear earthwork in the United Kingdom

Coordinates: 51.62252°N 0.35751°W

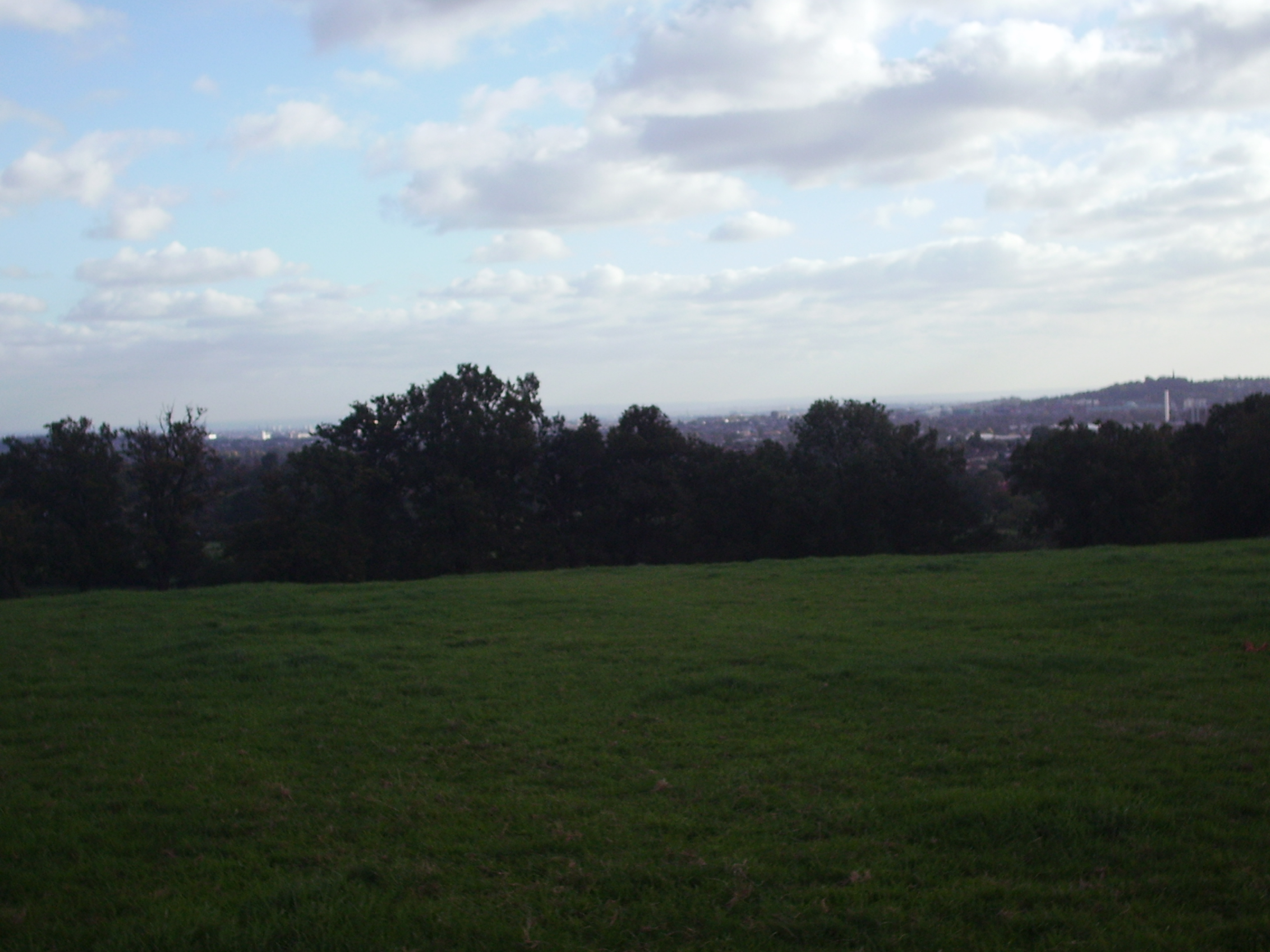
- View towards Harrow from near summit of Grim's Ditch

Highest point
- Elevation: 144 m (472 ft)

Geography
- Location within Greater London
- Location: Stanmore, England
- Parent range: The Grim's Ditches
- OS grid: TQ138928
- Topo map: OS Explorer 173

Climbing
- Access: Hatch End

Grim's Ditch or Grim's Dyke or Grimes Dike is a linear earthwork in the London Borough of Harrow, in the historic county of Middlesex. Thought to have been built by the Catuvellauni tribe as a defence against the Romans, it extended east–west about 6 miles (9.7 km) from the edge of Stanmore where an elevated neighbourhood of London, Stanmore Hill, adjoins Bushey Heath to the far north of Pinner Green – Cuckoo Hill. Today the remaining earthworks start mid-way at Harrow Weald Common.

== Attributes ==
=== Paths ===
A high path, Old Redding, an old highway, passes through the centre of the ridge and includes a map-marked viewpoint. Other extensive views through breaks in trees are a few hundred yards further up the "high road".

=== North Basin high point ===
The immediate London basin resembles London's present county: the three most southerly boroughs reach into the North Downs broad escarpment; those opposing take as their northern edge a broken ridge, low in the north-east, high in the north-west, along which is the Grim's Ditch earthwork. The two highest ridges in Greater London run along its southern edge (bordering Westerham, Kent and Woodmansterne, Surrey). The next highest point is Stanmore Hill, along the Grim's Ditch, where London adjoins Bushey, Hertfordshire.

=== Views ===
- Many parts of Central London can be seen, including the Shard London Bridge, which exceeds the height of all hills in London and the Home Counties.
- Beyond Harrow on the Hill to the south, Leith Hill can be seen (and its 20-metre-high tower through binoculars).

To the north and west are the Chilterns, and in particular Coombe Hill, Buckinghamshire can be seen.

The highest point of the earthwork is close to the county top of the historic county of Middlesex, above Grim's Dyke Golf Club on the 'Bushey Heath Walk' footpath. There, a stone marker placed by the Harrow Heritage Trust reads:

This ancient earthwork once stretched through Harrow for six miles from Cuckoo Hill, Pinner to Pear Wood, Stanmore, but now only parts remain. Named after Grim (another name for the English King (also the god of death), Woden).

=== Hotel and film location ===
Grim's Dyke

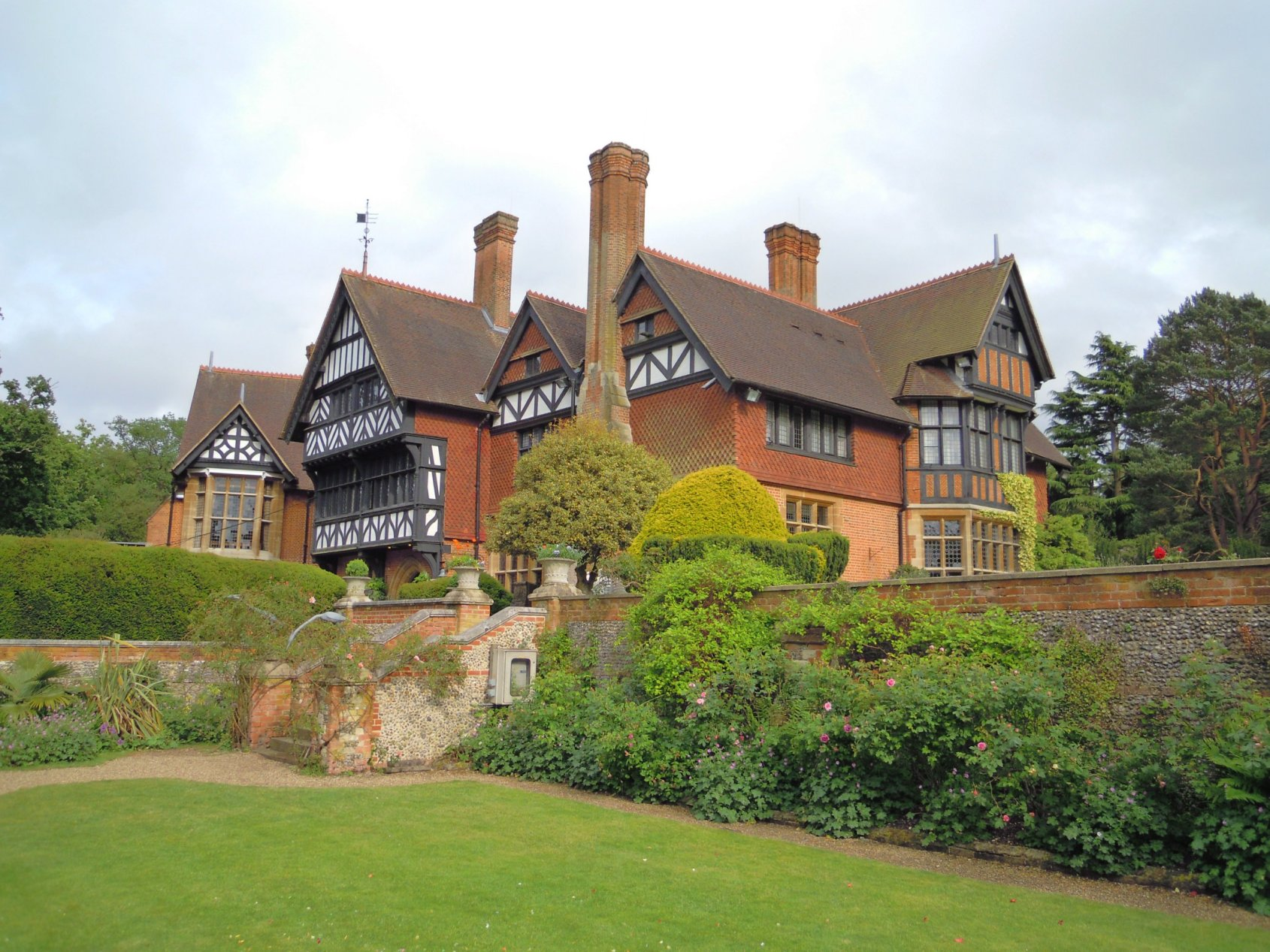
The former home of artist Frederick Goodall and opera librettist W. S. Gilbert

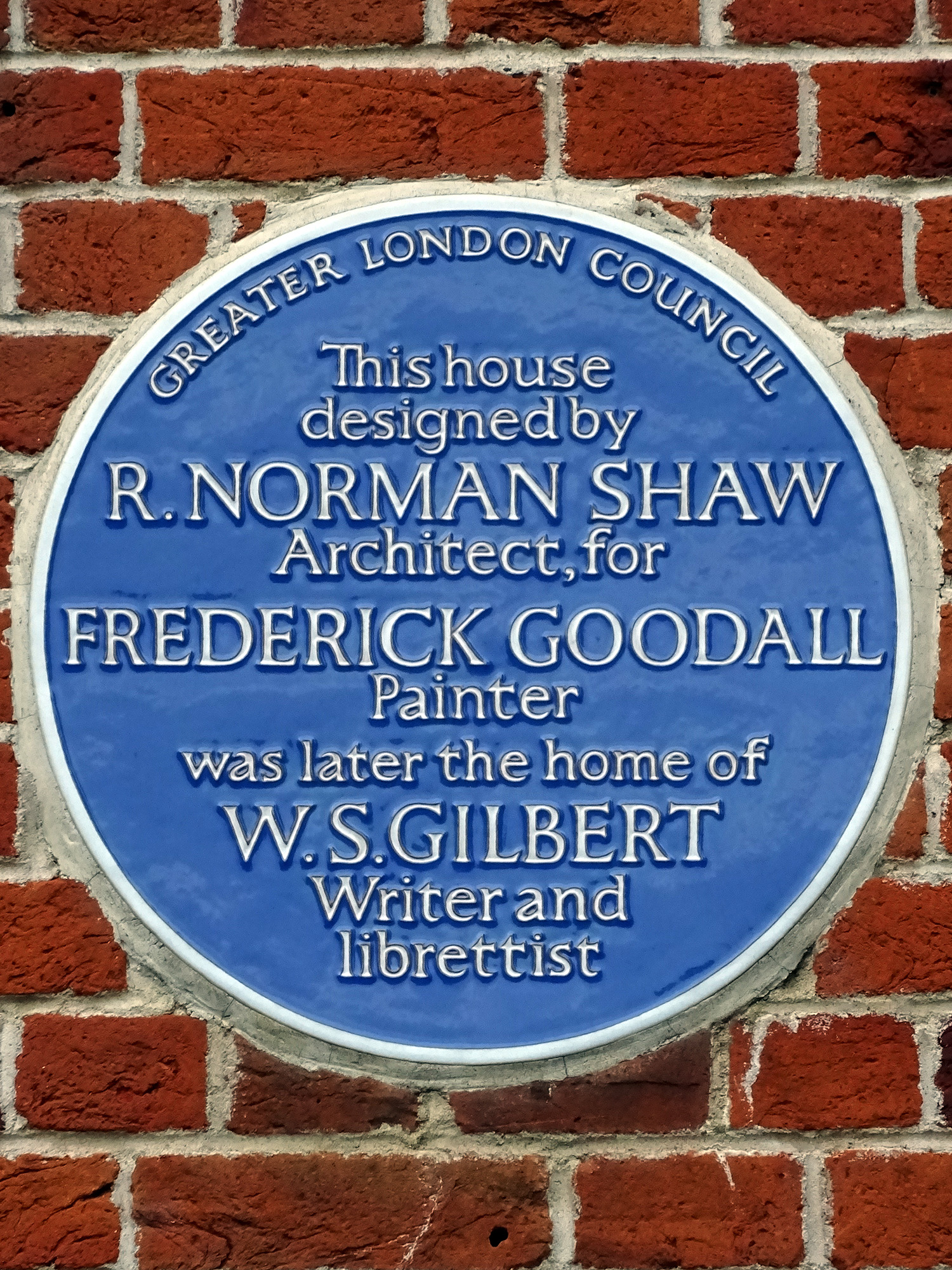
Blue plaque on Grim's Dyke

In the woods stands Grim's Dyke, a house designed in 1870 by Norman Shaw for the Victorian painter Frederick Goodall. Later, it was the country home of W. S. Gilbert (of Savoy opera fame) – he suffered a heart attack and drowned while trying to save a swimmer in the lake in the grounds. It is now a hotel and is often used as a film setting. The house and gatehouse are listed buildings.

== History ==
Grim's Dyke may have been built by the Catuvellauni tribe as a defence against the Romans. or as a boundary marker. An excavation in 1979 in the grounds of the Grim's Dyke Hotel gave a radiocarbon date of 50 AD ± 80 years, for a heath in the bank which suggests an Iron Age or Roman date. There is another earthwork close by in Pear Wood, Brockley Hill that has been suggested as an eastern continuation of the Grim's Dyke. This monument is of Roman or post-Roman date and runs at ninety degrees to Watling Street.

=== Trivia ===
The earthwork gave its name to the telephone exchange for Stanmore. The legacy is the first three numbers of many local landlines. (Note: GRImsdyke translates to 474 as a traditional number which is today preceded by (0)20 8)
