= Pinner Green =

Area of Pinner, London, England

Coordinates: 51.598033°N 0.394039°W

- Location within Greater London
- London borough: Harrow
- Ceremonial county: Greater London
- Region: London
- Country: England
- Sovereign state: United Kingdom
- Postcode district: HA5
- Post town: PINNER
- Dialling code: 020
- Police: Metropolitan
- Fire: London
- Ambulance: London
- UK Parliament: Ruislip, Northwood and Pinner
- London Assembly: Brent and Harrow

Pinner Green is a small locality of Pinner, in the north-west of the London Borough of Harrow, 13.2 miles north-west of Charing Cross. It is a suburban area mostly occupied by family houses and flats, with a small parade of independent shops, a Tesco supermarket and a modern Shell forecourt.

The main feature of Pinner Green is the Montesole playing fields, a large open green with a court with facilities to play tennis, football and basketball. Pinner Cricket Club plays its games at Montesole Playing Fields and has been established since 1835.

A high, but rarely steep, wooded escarpment known as Grim's Ditch (or Grim's Dyke) starts at the northern edge of Pinner Green and continues to Stanmore. Its remaining ancient earthworks today end short of Stanmore, at Harrow Weald.

== Heritage ==
=== Harrow Heritage Plaques ===
The brown plaques are awarded by the Harrow Heritage Trust, who secure the protection, preservation, restoration and improvement of the character and amenities of the London Borough of Harrow. There are currently two plaques in Pinner Green:

- Grim's Dyke, Montesole Playing Fields by the Dingles woods, Uxbridge Road awarded in 1993.
- Pinner Hill Farm, Pinner Hill Road awarded in 2011.

=== Pinner Chalk Mines ===
The mines began during the Late Medieval Period and were in use until the Victorian era. They have now been permanently closed.

=== A404 Pinner Green (Harrow Road) ===
The A404 Pinner Green continues on from the A404 Harrow Road. The Harrow Road was an ancient route between Harrow and Paddington.

A Victorian era cast iron signpost still standards undisturbed at the junction where the A404 meets Pinner Hill Road.

== Notable people ==
Elton John, an international chart topping singer and songwriter, lived on Pinner Hill Road as a child during the mid-20th century. He was educated at Pinner Wood Junior School.

== Transport ==
=== Rail ===
Pinner Underground station is 0.7 miles away and is on the Metropolitan line in London fare zone 5. In normal off-peak conditions the train takes approximately half an hour to Baker Street Underground station and approximately three-quarters of an hour to Aldgate Underground station.

Northwood Hills Underground station is 0.9 miles away and is also on the Metropolitan line but in London fare zone 6.

Hatch End railway station is 1.4 miles away and is on the London Overground Watford DC line in London fare zone 6. In normal off-peak conditions the train approximately takes three-quarters of an hour to Euston railway station.

=== Buses ===
Route	Start	End	Local Rail Connections
H11	Harrow Bus Station	Mount Vernon Hospital, Northwood	Pinner Station
H12	South Harrow Bus Station	Stanmore Station	Pinner Station, Hatch End Station
H13	Ruislip Lido	St Vincent's Park, Northwood Hills	Pinner Station, Northwood Hills Station

Public transport in Pinner is governed by London Transport.

== See also ==
- Pinner
- Hatch End
- Northwood
- Metro-land
