= Hendon Rural District =

Former local government area in the UK

Coordinates: 51.61°N 0.33°W

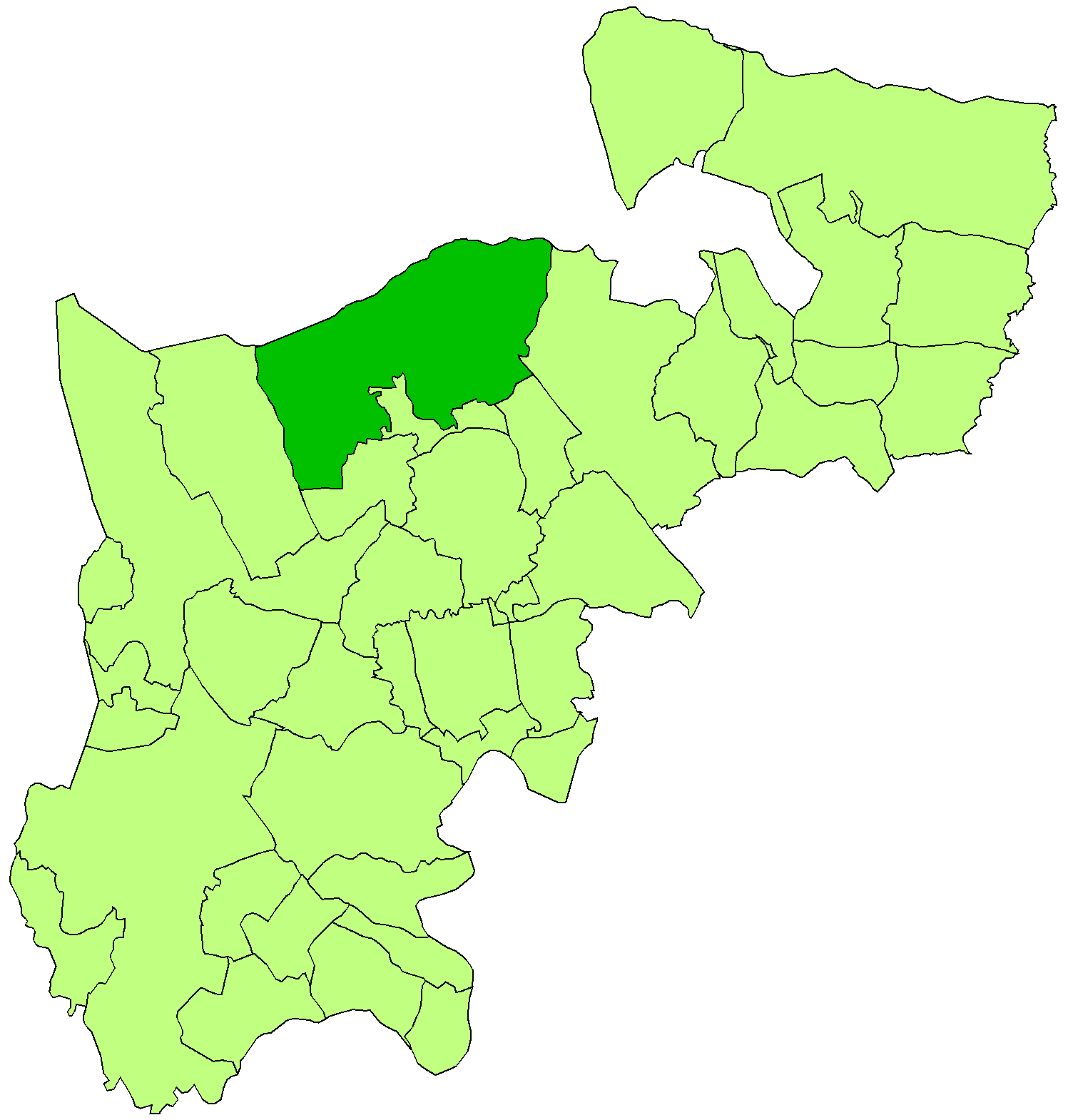
- Hendon Rural District within Middlesex in 1911
- History
  - Created: 1894
  - Abolished: 1934
- Status: Rural district
- Government: Hendon Rural District Council

Hendon was a rural district in Middlesex, England from 1894 to 1934.

The rural district was established in 1894 under the Local Government Act 1894, consisting of the following parishes:

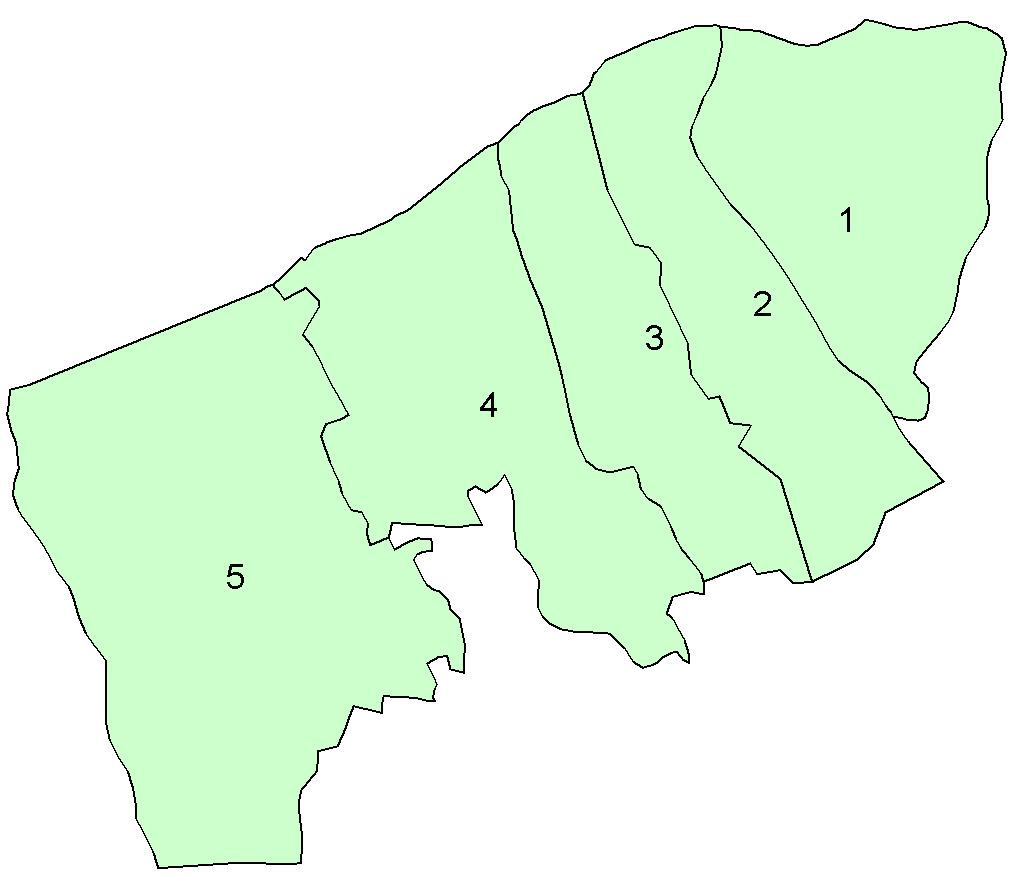
1. Edgware
2. Little Stanmore
3. Great Stanmore
4. Harrow Weald
5. Pinner

The parish of Hendon became an urban district in the same act, and existed alongside Hendon RD.

By the 1930s it had become increasingly urbanised, and under the review caused by the Local Government Act 1929, was abolished. It went to form the Harrow urban district, with the parish of Edgware having become part of the Municipal Borough of Hendon in 1932.
