= St John the Baptist, Pinner =

Coordinates: 51.594550°N 0.378879°W

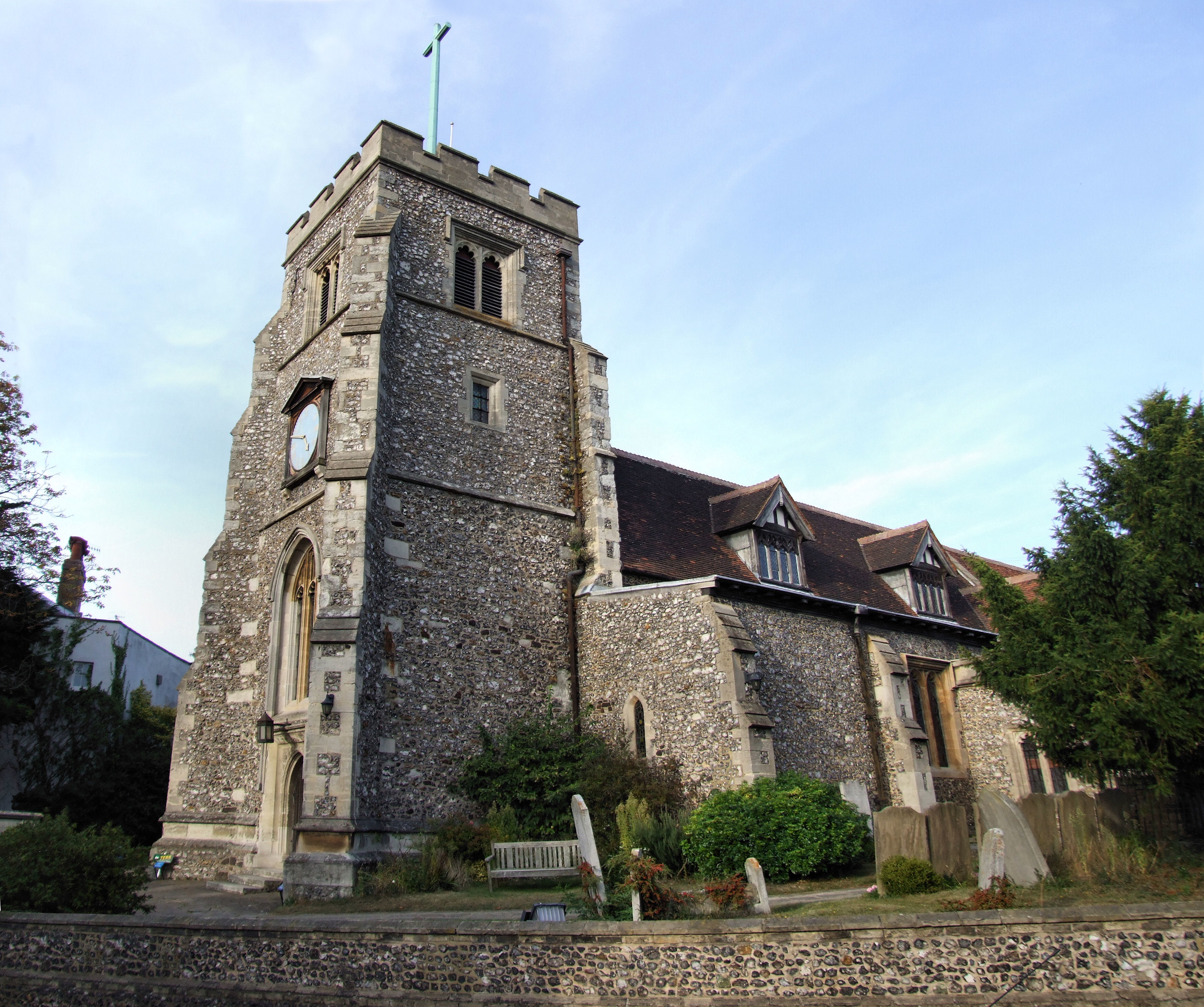
- St John the Baptist, Pinner
- St John the Baptist, Pinner
- Location: Church Hill, Pinner, London
- Country: England
- Denomination: Church of England
- Website: pinnerparishchurch.org.uk

Architecture
- Heritage designation: Grade II*

Administration
- Diocese: London
- Archdeaconry: Northolt
- Deanery: Harrow
- Parish: Pinner

Clergy
- Vicar: Revd Paul Hullyer

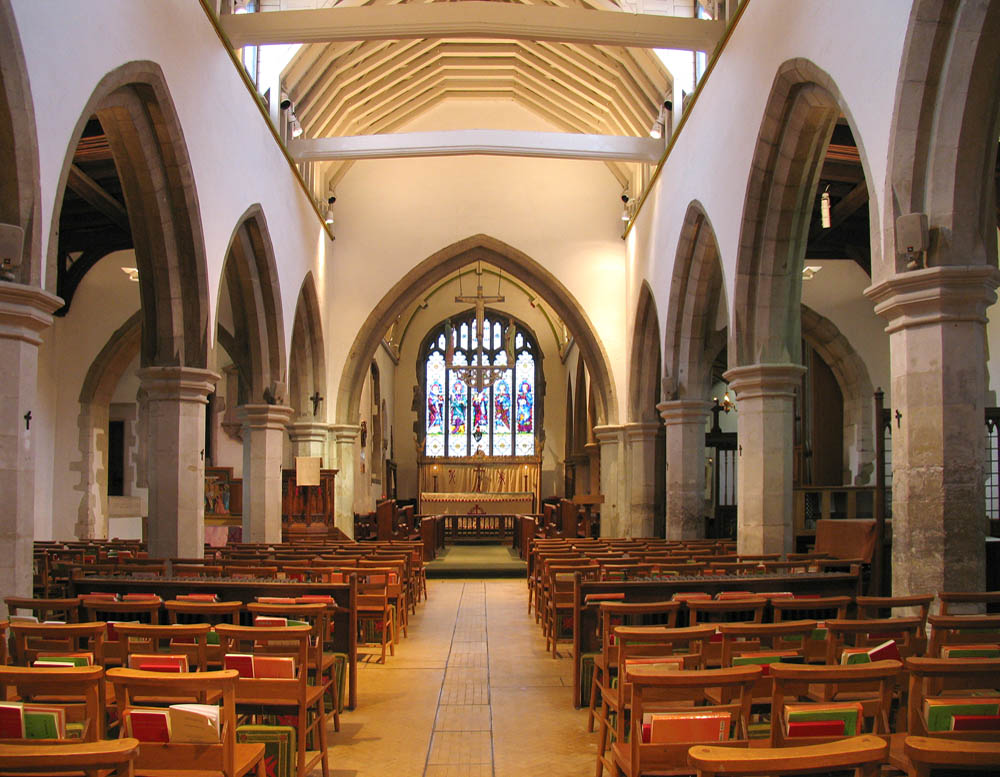
Interior

St John the Baptist, Pinner, is an Anglican church in Church Lane, Pinner, Middlesex.

== History ==
The church was consecrated in 1320, and largely dates from the 14th century. Originally it was a chapel subordinate to the ancient church of St Mary, Harrow on the Hill, forming part of the deanery of Croydon which came under the immediate jurisdiction of the Archbishop of Canterbury. This was because the Archbishop was the Lord of the Manor of Harrow. Over the years St John's grew independent of St Mary's in many ways, but it was not until 1766 that Pinner became a parish independent of Harrow.

Henry James Pye, Poet Laureate to King George III, was buried in the church and William Skenelsby, who died at the reputed age of 118 years, was in the churchyard.

The church has been Grade II* listed since 1951.

== Description ==
The West Tower and South Porch date from the 15th century. The vestry was designed by Temple Moore, and built in 1911. The stained glass windows are of many designs and ages, including two by Ninian Comper. The edges of the windows were restored by J. L. Pearson in 1879-80, and paid for by A. W. Tooke, a wealthy landowner in Pinner, and the son of William Tooke. Pearson also built the current church roof with gables, replacing an earlier one with attic windows.

The south chapel dates from 1859, and was enlarged in 1880. Among the church treasures is a 15th-century octagonal baptismal font, altar rails from the 17th century and an oak chest which must predate 1622, as it was recorded that it needed a new lock that year. The font cover dates from 1909. Numerous memorials include one in the church to Sir Christopher Clitherow, a former Lord Mayor of London who owned land on Pinner Hill in the seventeenth century; and an unusual one located in the churchyard, on the south side. It is in the form of a stone pyramid with a fake sarcophagus within, and was erected by the eighteenth-century botanist John Claudius Loudon in memory of his parents.
