= Chris Roycroft-Davis =

British journalist (born 1948)

Chris Roycroft-Davis (born 13 August 1948) is a journalist working in the United Kingdom. He was chief leader writer of The Sun.

== Career ==
In 1994 he became chief leader writer of The Sun, writing the paper's editorial column The Sun Says six days a week. Roycroft-Davis left The Sun in 2005 to become a professional speaker, media coach, writer and broadcaster.

He worked as a speech and article writer for David Cameron and currently writes political commentaries for the Daily Express and contributes to the comment pages of The Times. His book, How to be King of the Media Jungle, was published in October 2007.
