= Parks and open spaces in the London Borough of Harrow =

The London Borough of Harrow is one of the northern outer London boroughs: as such much of the Metropolitan Green Belt land is within the Borough boundaries. Parks and open spaces range from the large area around Harrow-on-the-Hill to the smaller gardens and recreation grounds; there are also a number of spaces taken up with golf courses. It has been suggested that Harrow is continuously losing its green space and trees.

Areas of open space include:

- Alexandra Park, South Harrow
- Bentley Priory, Stanmore: 165 acres (66ha) open space; Site of Special Scientific Interest and Local Nature Reserve
- Byron Park, Wealdstone
- Canons Park: 45 acres (18ha) 18th century parkland
- Centenary Park, Stanmore
- Chandos Recreational Ground, Edgware
- Grim's Dyke Open Space, Harrow Weald
- Harrow Park, Harrow on the Hill
- Harrow Weald Common, Harrow Weald
- Headstone Manor Recreation Park: 57 acres (230,000 m^{2}) including the Museum and Headstone Manor & Bessborough Cricket Club
- Newton Park, Rayners Lane
- Pinner Memorial Park, Pinner
- Pinner Park Farm tenant dairy farmers Hall & Sons: total 230 acres (0.93 km^{2})
- Pinner Village Gardens, Pinner
- Roxbourne Park, Rayners Lane
- Stanmore Common: 120 acres (48ha); Local Nature Reserve
- Stanmore Country Park: 77.5 acres (31ha); Local Nature Reserve
- Stanmore Marsh, Stanmore
- Streamside Reservation, alongside Yeading Brook, Pinner
- The Grove Open Space, Lowlands Road, Harrow
- West Harrow Recreational Ground, West Harrow
