= Stanmore Country Park =

Stanmore Country Park could refer to:

- Stanmore Country Park, Bridgnorth
- Stanmore Country Park, London
