= Bernays Institute =

Ernest Bernays Memorial Institute
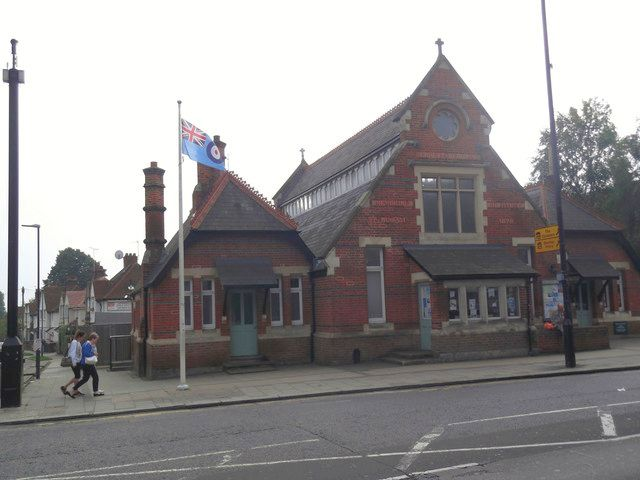
- Bernays Institute (here, with an erected Royal Air Force flag)
- Interactive map of the Ernest Bernays Memorial Institute area

General information
- Architectural style: Victorian
- Location: 25 The Broadway, Stanmore, England
- Coordinates: 51.6175°N 0.3103°W
- Completed: 1871

Design and construction
- Architect: J.T. Barker
- Designations: Locally listed

Bernays Institute is a Victorian building in Stanmore, London Borough of Harrow, England, that currently functions as a community event hall, Bernays Memorial Hall.

== History ==
It was built in the old village of Great Stanmore as a parish hall and opened on 8 December 1871 by Lord George Hamilton. Bernays Institute was built as a memorial to Ernest Bernays, eldest son of Reverend Leopold Bernays, who was the rector of Stanmore at the time and chairman of the Great Stanmore Gas Company off Marsh Lane. Ernest died at the age of 22 in a drowning accident on holiday in Ireland on 31 August 1870 – this date is written on the front of the building – he was buried at St John the Evangelist churchyard. The building was built on a plot of glebe land that was sold by Leopold on behalf of the church.

In its early years the hall was often used for Bible classes, concerts and was used by the local temperance society. In 1899 it housed a library. That same decade a working men's club opened beside the building which is still open today.

In 1959 as reported by the Harrow Observer, Harrow Urban District mayor H. W. Cutler called Bernays Institute "an awful dump [..] an eyesore in a pleasant district [..] a shack of the worst architectural design" during a dinner hosted in the institute's honour. Cutler pledged to build a new building in its place.

In the 1980s its future became uncertain as schemes for local town centre redevelopment and a shopping complex were made that involved demolishing the hall. Following opposition in 1991 the institute was saved from demolition. A committee was set up by fundraisers to restore the building which included a grant by the Harrow Heritage Trust. It was added to the Local List of buildings of Architectural and Historic interest in 1993. Restoration work took 18 years, completing in 2009.

== Architecture ==
Bernays Institute was built by Victorian architect J.T. Barker in church-like red brick with Bath stone features and a clerestory. During restoration, a mural was created by a local artist inside the hall that shows various landmarks and the faces of residents of Stanmore including the Bernays family.

== Bernays Gardens ==
Named after the Bernays, these public gardens were constructed in the 20th century located off Old Church Lane, at the site of the old Manor House that was demolished in 1930.
