= Frederick Gordon (hotelier) =

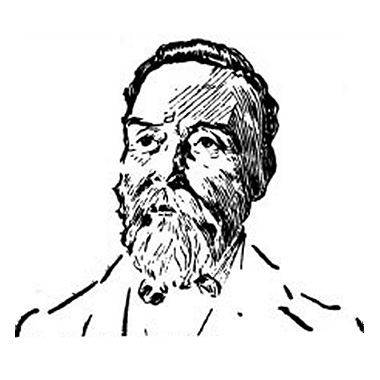
- Born: 22 July 1835; Ross-on-Wye, Herefordshire, England
- Died: 22 March 1904 (aged 68); Hotel Metropole, Cannes, France
- Burial place: Churchyard of St John the Evangelist, Great Stanmore
- Occupation: Hotelier
- Years active: c. 1880–1904
- Organization: Gordon Hotels

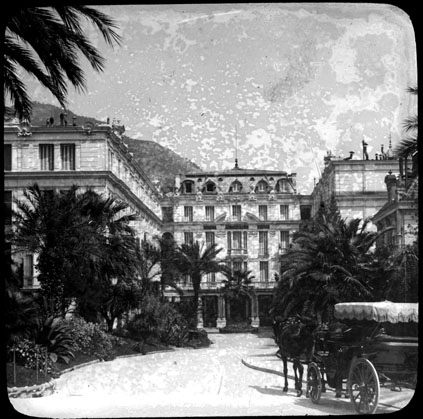
Hotel Metropole, Monte Carlo

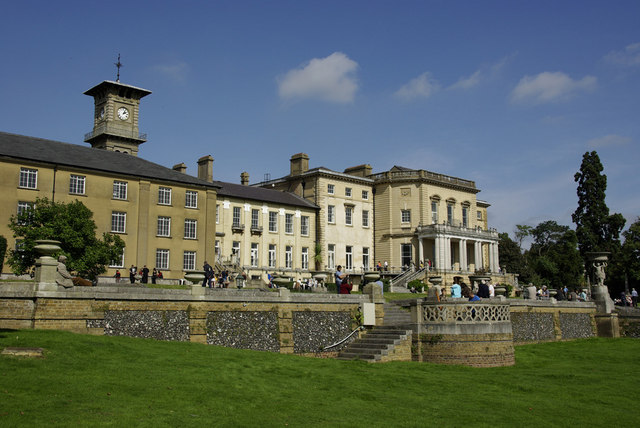
Bentley Priory, Stanmore

Frederick Gordon (22 July 1835 – 22 March 1904) was a British entrepreneur and businessman, known primarily as a hotelier.

== Biography ==
=== Early life ===
He was born on 22 July 1835 in Ross-on-Wye, the eldest son of Charles John Gordon, who established himself as a decorator and paperhanger in the City of London. Frederick began by assisting his father, but then trained in the law, and always called himself a solicitor. Gordon turned in his thirties to the promotion of elegant restaurants, hitherto not fully developed in Victorian London. With Horatio Davies, later owner of Pimm's and Lord Mayor of London, he formed Messrs. Gordon and Company. Their first success came with the conversion in 1868 of the fifteenth-century Crosby Hall, on Bishopsgate in the City of London, into a fashionable eating place, with an open layout in the vast Great Hall instead of the traditional boxes. Waitresses were employed, and there were facilities for women visitors. The King's Head in Fenchurch Street followed, also richly decorated. Gordon's wider fame began with his creation in 1874 of the Holborn Restaurant further west. The Holborn was expanded in 1879 and again in 1883–4. Illustrated brochures depicted a series of richly decorated saloons embellished with marble, fresco work and stained glass. A favourite venue for institutional dinners and parties, the Holborn survived until it was bombed in the Second World War.

=== Hotels ===
After 1890 Gordon moved into hotels, founding the Gordon Hotels chain and becoming known as "The Napoleon of the Hotel World". Among those in his ownership were the Grand Hotel in Trafalgar Square and the Metropole Hotel in London; the Burlington Hotel, Eastbourne; the Brighton Metropole; the Hotel Metropole, Cannes; and the Hotel Metropole, Monte Carlo. He was also chairman of The Frederick Hotels Company Limited, and held directorships at a wide variety of companies including Ashanti Goldfields, Pears soap, and Bovril.

He bought the Apollinaris mineral water business in 1897 from its founder Edward Steinkopff and his co-partners for nearly £2,000,000 (approximately £2–4 billion in 2016).

=== Stanmore ===
Gordon is credited with developing Stanmore from a rural village to a London suburb. In 1890 he opened his own railway line, the Harrow and Stanmore Railway, to serve his luxury country hotel there, Bentley Priory. He also built a residential avenue of suburban houses in Stanmore, which he named Gordon Avenue, to attract wealthy Londoners to come to live in the country and commute into the city on his new railway. He also laid out Stanmore Golf Course. Neither the Bentley Priory Hotel nor the railway were commercially successful, and in 1899 he wound up the Harrow and Stanmore Railway and sold it outright to the LNWR for £35,000. Gordon took up residence with his family at Bentley Priory.

== Death and legacy ==
Frederick Gordon died on 22 March 1904 while staying at his Hotel Metropole in Cannes. His body was brought back to Britain and buried in the family grave at the church of St John the Evangelist, Great Stanmore.

The Gordon Hotels chain continued after Frederick's death. In 1963 it became part of Grand Metropolitan Hotels. In 1997 the company merged with Guinness and is now part of Diageo.

== Family life ==
Frederick Gordon's sister Elizabeth (Lizzie) married his business partner Horatio Davies in 1867, who bought Pimms from its original owner/founder. She died on 14 November 1907.
