= Bentley Priory =

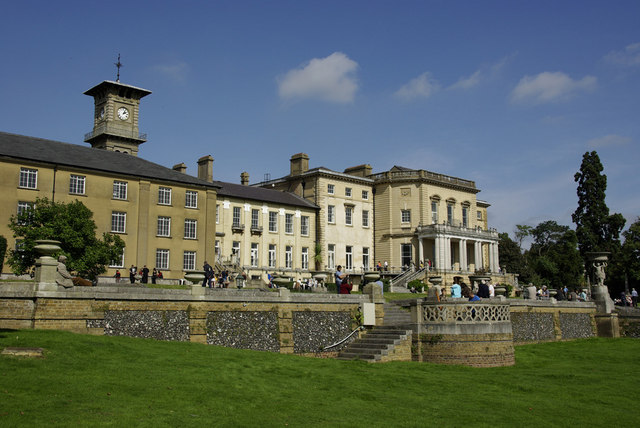
- The priory in 2008

- Location within London Borough of Harrow
- 51°37′36″N 0°20′03″W
- Type: Stately home
- Location: Harrow
- OS grid reference: TQ 15473 93279

History
- Built: 1789–1818

Site notes
- Area: London
- Architects: John Soane; Robert Smirke

Listed Building – Grade II*
- Official name: Central entrance block of Bentley Priory
- Designated: 25 May 1983
- Reference no.: 1358638

National Register of Historic Parks and Gardens
- Official name: Bentley Priory
- Designated: 9 December 1999
- Reference no.: 1001440

Bentley Priory is an eighteenth to nineteenth century stately home and deer park in Stanmore on the northern edge of the Greater London area in the London Borough of Harrow.

It was originally a medieval priory or cell of Augustinian Canons in Harrow Weald, then in Middlesex. There are no remains of the original priory, but it probably stood near Priory House, off Clamp Hill.

In 1775, Sir John Soane designed a large mansion house north of the original priory, called Bentley Priory, for the wealthy businessman James Duberley. This was added to throughout the eighteenth and nineteenth centuries by various owners. It was significantly extended in 1788, again by Sir John Soane, for John Hamilton, 1st Marquess of Abercorn. The priory was the final home of the Dowager Queen Adelaide, queen consort of William IV, before her death there in 1849. It subsequently served as a hotel and girls' school before being acquired by the Royal Air Force in 1926.

In the Second World War, Bentley Priory was the headquarters of RAF Fighter Command, and it remained in RAF hands in various roles until 2008.

As of 2013, the site has been sold to a developer and plans to convert some of the building to luxury apartments and build new houses have been approved and construction commenced. The Bentley Priory Battle of Britain Trust has secured part of the building to be used as a museum and memorial dedicated to those who served in the RAF.

== The priory ==
Roman remains have been found in the grounds of the priory.

=== Medieval beginnings ===
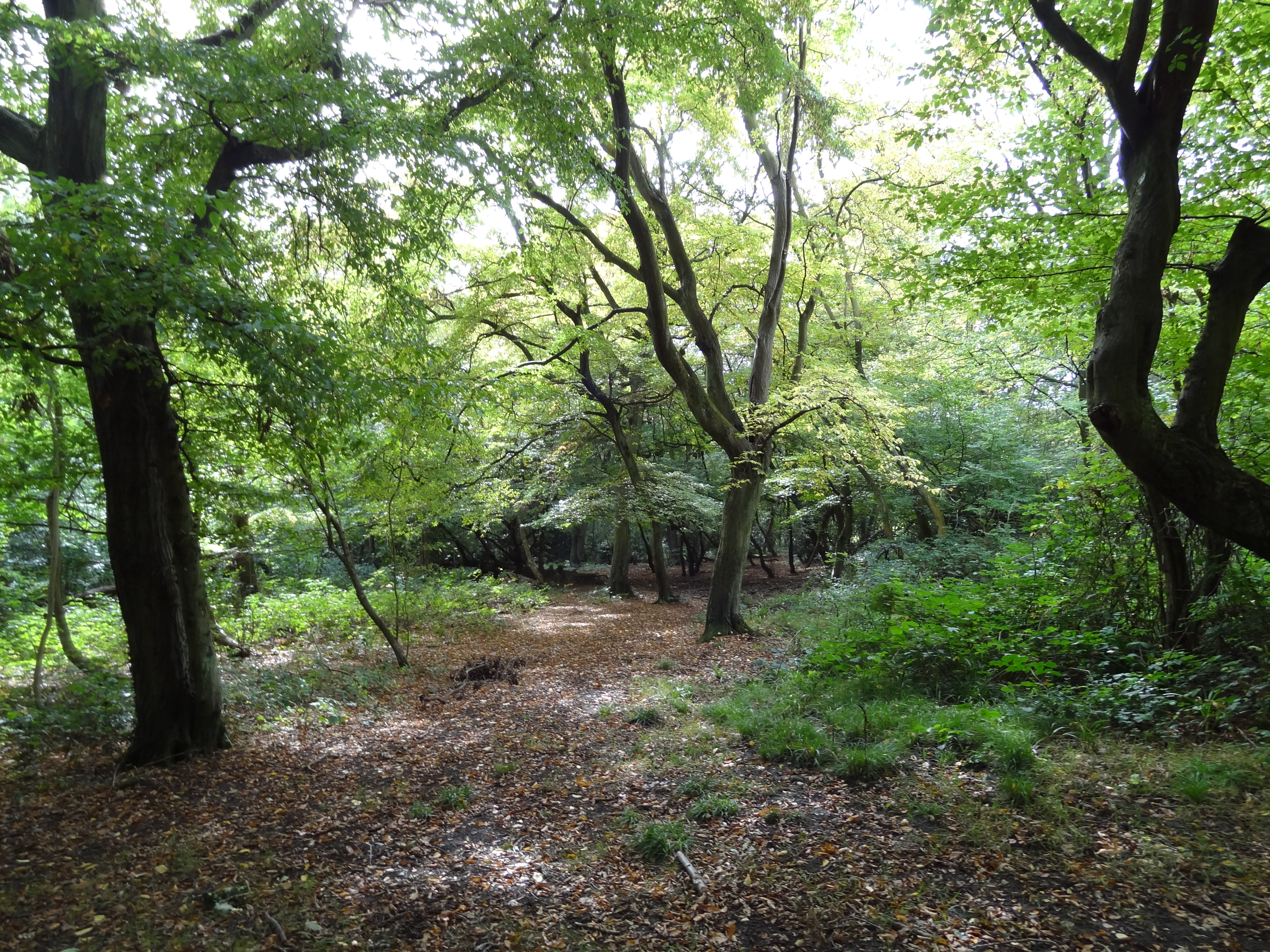
Heriot Wood, in the grounds of the Priory, probably dates back to the end of last Ice Age

Although little detail is known, the lands of Bentley Priory and the surrounding area were scantily populated but civilised long before the time of the Romans. At the time the first Priory was dedicated, the majority of the area was in the Manor of Harrow. The rest of the land in which the Priory now stands was in the area held by the Count of Mortain and known as Stanmore Magna.

Although the area was in part heavily wooded, many Anglo Saxon finds have been made indicating thriving communities around Brockley Hill and Harrow Weald Common. Professor J E B Gover in his book Place Names of Middlesex, derives the word Bentley from Anglo-Saxon: the prefix Bent from 'beonet', a kind of coarse grass or bent grass and the suffix ley from 'leah, a tract of cultivated or cultivable land, a piece of land cleared from forest for pasture, etc. Thus the name Bentley would seem to mean land artificially cleared of coarse grass for pasture or cultivation.

By the time the Domesday Book was compiled in 1086, William the Conqueror had invested his own bishop (Lansfranc) with the Archbishopric of Canterbury and restored the lands of Harrow, appropriated by King Edward the Confessor, to the Church. The original Priory, which was the only monastic establishment in the Manor of Harrow, housed a cell of Augustinian Friars. Bentley Priory is (doubtfully) said to have been founded in 1171 by Ranulf de Glanvill, who was King Henry II's Justiciar from 1180 to 1189. It was dedicated to St. Mary Magdalene, and was in the patronage of the Archbishop of Canterbury. It may have been founded as a cell of St Gregory's Priory, Canterbury, and was certainly under its rule by 1301, when the prior of Bentley was reported to have let a farm without the approval of his superior, the prior of St Gregory's.

In 1243, the king pardoned the prior the interest on 60 shillings which he had borrowed from the Jews, and in 1291 the prior's goods at Stanmore were valued at 10 shillings, and land and rents in Wotton at 13s 4d. It is referred to in the early 14th century, but according to the court rolls of manor of Harrow in 1535, St Gregory's had ceased to maintain a cell at Bentley many years earlier.

The first Priory was reported by Druett in his book, The Stanmores and Harrow Weald Through the Ages, to stand further downhill than the present building. He places it in the area of Priory House on Clamp Hill, with the chapel standing apart on Harrow Weald Common. However, the evidence to substantiate this is inconclusive. It would appear that a small agricultural hamlet existed in the shadow of the Priory Chapel. This chapel, of which all trace has been lost, is believed to have served the 'city' community that lived on the Weald.

Apart from a short list of Priors from this period in The Victoria County History of Middlesex, the only other reference to the Priory is in Chronicle by Matthew Paris who was a monk and chief copyist at St Albans. He mentions under the date 1248 the story 'Of the Miserable Death of the Priory of Bentley'. Apparently a hayrick fell upon him whilst he was inspecting it.

Another early reference to the Priory can be found in The Harrow Rolls of 1512, These state that:

'The Priory was built in honour of St Mary Magdalene, and the Archbishop of Canterbury beyond memory gave the Priory with all its lands to the Priory of St Gregory without the wall of Canterbury, and to the convent there in pure alms; that they from time of such grant used to find a priest to celebrate Mass and other divine services in the chapel within the Priory each week, and that the priest used to be called the Prior of Bentley'.

"Thus Bentley Priory and its lands, apart from being passed back and forth between church and lay owners in its early years, managed to avoid falling into the covetous hands of its neighbours."

St Gregory's was dissolved in 1536, and the buildings and land of the former Bentley Priory were granted to Archbishop Cranmer, but in 1542 he was forced to hand them back to the king, and in 1546 they were granted to Henry Needham and William Sacheverell.

=== Subsequent buildings ===
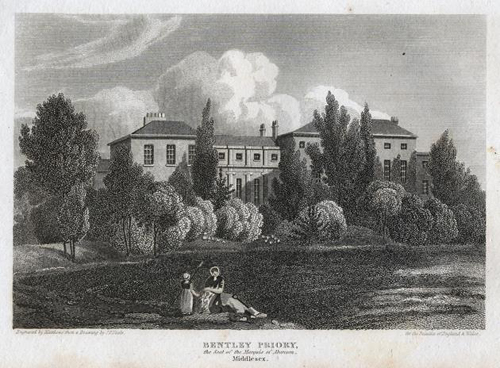
A print by an unknown artist of Bentley Priory House, Stanmore, England c1800.

In 1775, Sir John Soane, one of the most pre-eminent 18th century architects, designed a new house north of the original priory called Bentley Priory, for James Duberley, an Army contractor. Duberley is thought to have pulled down the original Priory building before having a more imposing house built on a higher point of the ridge some distance from the original site. Druett based his idea that the original site of the Priory can be found further down the slope at Priory House on the supposition that Duberley would have built higher on the ridge, 'to show off the evidence of his wealth and importance'. The house was sold in 1788 to John Hamilton, who succeeded his uncle as Earl of Abercorn in 1789. On his elevation in the peerage the following year to Marquess, he made extensive alterations to the house and park. He commissioned Sir John Stone to extend and refurbish the house in a more lavish and sumptuous manner, and the outside of the house as it appears today is largely due to his money and Soane's vision (although the clock tower was added at a later date).

The refurbishments included a gallery of fine paintings, several large apartments and a grand staircase of Portland stone; the intricate wooden banister is thought to have been added by Sir John Kelk. In the early 1860s, Sir Robert Smirke (architect of the British Museum) was commissioned by the Marquess to make further additions to the Priory.

The Marquess lived at the Priory in the style of a true nobleman of his day. He was the only man who held peerage titles in all three kingdoms: England, Scotland, and Ireland. As a result of his influence, the Priory soon became a rendezvous for many political and literary celebrities. Visitors included: Pitt, Wellington, Canning, the Lords Liverpool and Sidmouth, and the poets Wordsworth, Moore, and Campbell. Sir William and Lady Emma Hamilton (who was later the mother of Lord Nelson's illegitimate daughter Horatia) and thespians Mrs Sarah Siddons and John Kemble were attracted to the beautiful surroundings.

Sir Walter Scott was a frequent visitor in 1807, spending much of his time in the summerhouse which was built on an island in the lake, writing and revising Marmion. The lake is still in existence as part of the Bentley Priory Nature Reserve, but can no longer be seen from the Priory due to the growth of surrounding trees. It is also no longer part of the Bentley Priory land.

James Hamilton, a boy of seven when he became the second Marquess of Abercorn, took up residence in the Priory with his guardian, Lord Aberdeen. As well as being his uncle by marriage, Aberdeen became his stepfather in 1815 when he married the widow of Lord Hamilton. Until 1832, when James came of age, the Priory became the principal rendezvous of the Tory Party. Upon reaching his majority, the second Marquess married and lived only intermittently at the Priory. His third son, Lord Ernest Hamilton, says in his reminiscences that his father was 'compelled to leave Stanmore in self-preservation'. The house was so close to London that many of his friends visited. They were so enamoured of the place that Lady Blessington had called 'the most singular place on Earth' that they outstayed their welcome. The family became nomadic, searching for a place to settle in England and living in furnished houses while their possessions were packed away.

=== Queen Adelaide ===
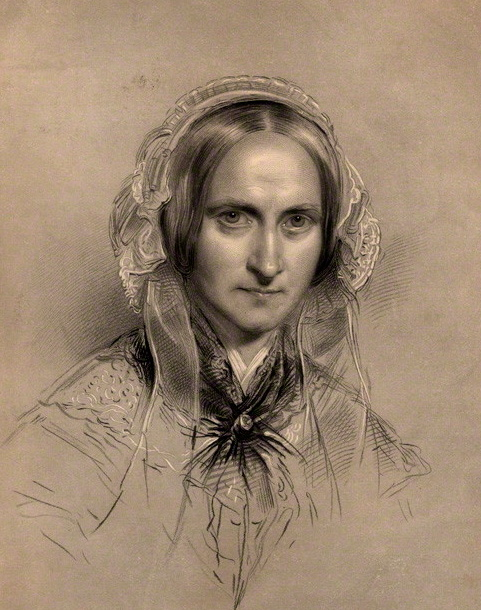
Princess Adelaide of Saxe-Meiningen (1792 - 1849), consort of William IV, spent her final years at Bentley Priory.

In 1846, Dowager Queen Adelaide, widow of William IV, leased the Priory, but it was not until 1848 that she finally moved in. By this time, she was quite ill from dropsy, and on her arrival apparently found the stairs too much to cope with. A suite of rooms were prepared for her on the ground floor, and it was in these rooms that she would receive Queen Victoria, her niece, and Prince Albert during their visits.

Speculation remains over the reason for the decoration of the ceiling in the room we call today the Adelaide Room. It was long believed that the ceiling was painted with frescos depicting the Arts and four Seasons to give Queen Adelaide something of interest to look at while lying sick in bed. However, on the basis of evidence obtained from the Royal Library at Windsor Castle, it now seems likely that she actually used the area of the present VIP suite for her bedroom and that this was where she died on 2 December 1849 at the age of 57.

After Queen Adelaide's death, the Priory was scarcely used until the estate was bought by Sir John Kelk in 1863. Sir John Kelk was an eminent Victorian engineer and the contractor for the Albert Memorial. He also donated the lychgate and lectern to Stanmore Church. The lych gate is still in existence and in regular use. Sir John began immediate improvements to the Priory spending £9,000 on the conservatories alone (demolished in 1939 in order to provide additional office space). He also added a picture gallery, a library, the clock tower, an orangery (which stood some way in front of the present main entrance) a cedar garden and a deer park.

=== Gordon Hotels ===
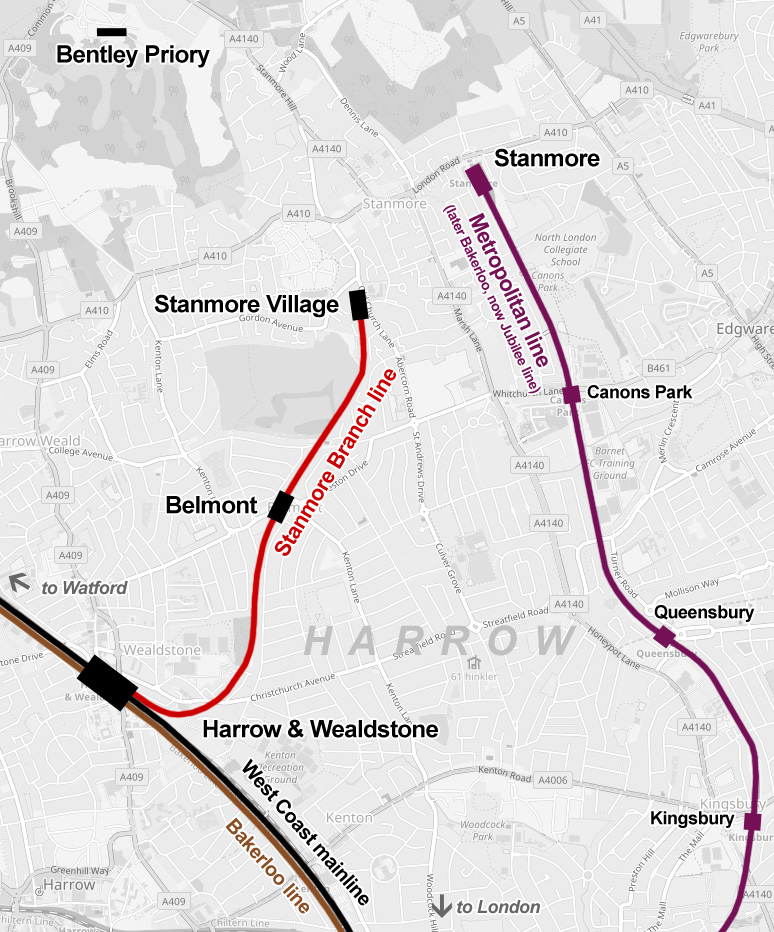
Frederick Gordon built the Stanmore branch line to bring guests to Bentley Priory

In its heyday, the Priory estate boasted no fewer than 20 gardeners. A Tuscan portico was added to the garden in front of the house (now the back) at about this time. The magnificent Oriental Plane tree was brought from abroad and planted around this time.

In 1882, the Priory was bought by Frederick Gordon, of Gordon Hotels, who converted it into a residential hotel. In 1884, he built a house, 'Glenthorn', in the Priory grounds for his family to live in. On the front of the house was the Gordon Badge (a flexed bow and arrow) and motto Fortuna Sequatur, which means 'Let Fortune Attend'. Despite surviving two World Wars, the house is no longer standing. Access to the hotel from London was not ideal, so Gordon had the railway line extended from Harrow to Stanmore via the Stanmore branch line for the convenience of his guests.

The railway cost £48,000 which Gordon raised by means of £36,000 in shares and £12,000 in debenture bonds. The remains of the old station can still be seen incorporated into a new building at the entrance to Gordon Avenue. It is almost certain that Gordon tried to sell the Priory in 1895.

Despite access to the Gordon Family records and research by Debenham, Tewson & Chinnocks who still practise in the city, no reason for the failure of the hotel has been identified nor why it was not auctioned unless, of course, it failed to meet its reserve price. Despite the railway, the hotel was never a financial success, so the Gordons and their eleven children moved from 'Glenthorn' into the Priory and lived there until the death of Frederick Gordon in 1908.

=== School days ===
The Priory changed hands yet again and was re-opened as a girls school. The school housed 70 boarders, and as part of its music focus, maintained a number of pianos in separate soundproof rooms. For several years the school prospered as a female preserve. Male staff were required to leave by 9:30pm when the gates were locked. Any man inadvertently entering the grounds was politely but rapidly removed. Local actor and journalist Pete Knobbler referred to his great-uncle's attempt to remain in the school after hours in an article published in the Harrow Observer in 1983.

After World War I, the school ran into financial trouble. At the end of the winter term, 28 December 1924, the school gates closed for good.

== RAF Bentley Priory ==
In 1926 the Priory and part of the grounds was sold to the Air Ministry and it served as the Inland Area (Training Command). In the Second World War, Bentley Priory was the headquarters of RAF Fighter Command for which it gained historic significance. After the war the site took on various RAF administrative roles until final closure took place on 30 May 2008. The commander of RAF Fighter Command at the time of the Battle of Britain, Sir Hugh Dowding, was honoured with a peerage, as Baron Dowding of Bentley Priory in 1943.

== Bentley Priory today ==
The estate and house was purchased in 2011 by developers City and County in conjunction with Barratt Homes who planned to develop it into luxury housing.

In 2013 an appeal was launched to turn the priory house into a museum commemorating its role in the Battle of Britain. The Bentley Priory Museum was formally opened to the public in September 2013 by Charles III, then Prince of Wales. It commenced full public access in January 2014, managed by The Bentley Priory Battle of Britain Trust. The grounds are now Bentley Priory Nature Reserve, a Site of Special Scientific Interest.

== See also ==
- List of monastic houses in London
- RAF Bentley Priory
- Bentley Priory Nature Reserve
