= Ellen Hollond =

English writer and philanthropist

Ellen J. Hollond
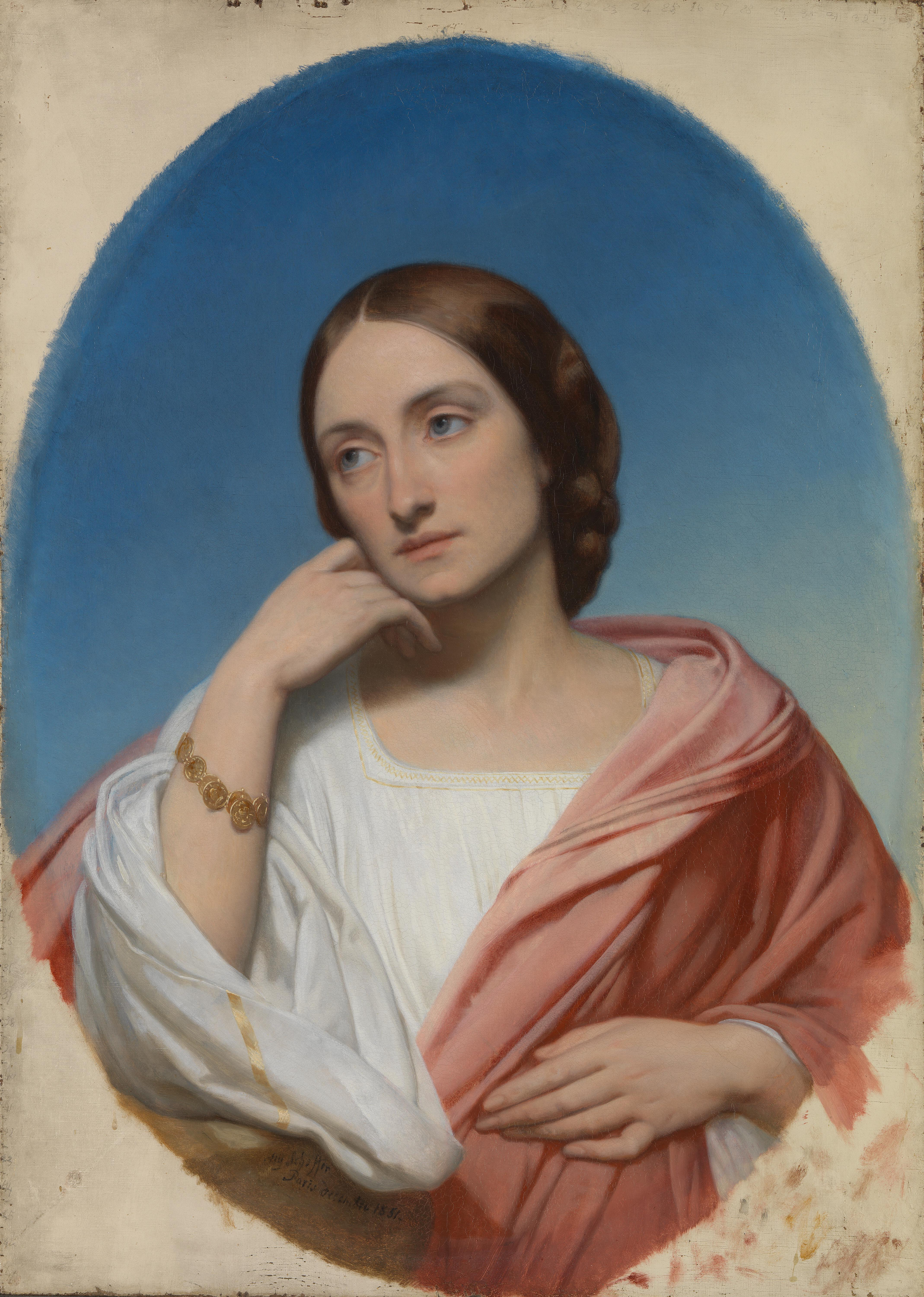
- Born: Ellen Julia Teed; 1822; Madras
- Died: 29 November 1884; Stanmore Hall, Middlesex, England
- Occupations: Writer; Salonnière
- Writing career
- Language: English

Ellen Julia Hollond, née Teed (1822–1884) was an English writer and philanthropist.

== Life ==
Ellen Julia Teed was born at Madras in 1822. Her father was Thomas Teed, and her mother's maiden name was Jordan. She was sent to England as a young child, and her parents subsequently settled to live at Stanmore, Middlesex.

In 1840 she married Robert Hollond, the balloonist and Whig M.P. for Hastings from 1837 to 1852. She spent part of the year, until his death in 1877, at her salon in Paris, which attracted the leading liberals. According to Edmond de Pressensé, her circle was the most distinguished circle in Paris. It included Odilon Barrot, Montalembert, Charles de Rémusat, François Mignet, Henri Martin, Laboulaye, Joseph d'Haussonville, Pierre Lanfrey, and Lucien-Anatole Prévost-Paradol. Mrs. Hollond herself was a listener rather than a talker. Antipathy to the Second French Empire and to ultramontanism united royalists and republicans, liberal Catholics and theists. Nassau Senior met Jules Armand Dufaure there in 1862.

In 1846, she sat for the head of Monica in Ary Scheffer's picture of St. Augustine and his mother, and in 1852 Scheffer painted her portrait, now in the National Gallery. About 1844 Mrs. Hollond started the first crèche in London. She also founded an English nurses' home in Paris, with a branch at Nice; the latter was still in existence at the end of the nineteenth century. She died at Stanmore Hall, 29 November 1884.

== Works ==
- (anon.) Channing, sa vie et ses œuvres, 1857. With an introduction by Charles de Rémusat.
- (anon.) La vie de village en Angleterre, 1862.
- Les Quakers, études sur les premiers Amis et leur société, 1870.
- Ellen Julia Hollond (1864). A Lady's Journal of Her Travels in Egypt and Nubia (1858-9). Emily Faithfull.
