= Stanmore and Canons Park Synagogue =

Synagogue in Stanmore, London

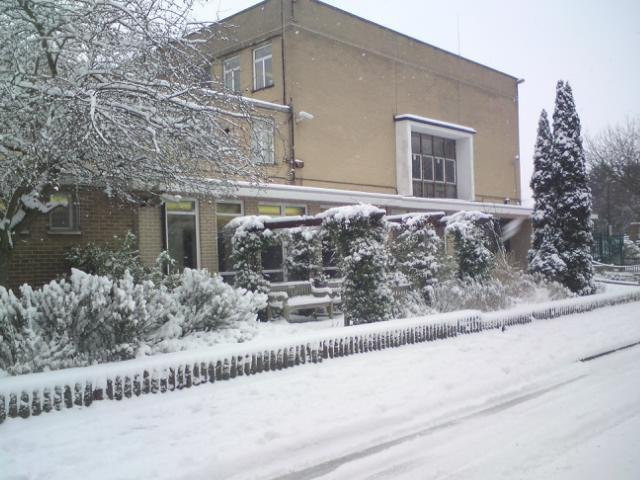
- The synagogue in winter 2009

- Location of the synagogue in Greater London

Religion
- Affiliation: Orthodox Judaism
- Rite: Nusach Ashkenaz
- Ecclesiastical or organisational status: Synagogue
- Status: Active

Location
- Location: London Road, Stanmore, Borough of Harrow, London, England
- Country: United Kingdom
- Coordinates: 51°37′15″N 0°17′56″W

Architecture
- Established: 1946 (as a congregation)
- Completed: 1951
- Direction of façade: North

Website
- stanmoresynagogue.org

Stanmore and Canons Park Synagogue is an Orthodox Jewish congregation and synagogue, located on London Road in Stanmore, in the Borough of Harrow, London, England, in the United Kingdom.

Membership peaked around 2012, when the congregation had the largest community of any single Orthodox congregation in Europe. Since then membership declined substantially - a 2024 synagogue council report stated membership was at its lowest level since 1969. The congregation is a constituent of the United Synagogue, and it worships in the Ashkenazi rite although now has a Sephardi offshoot with regular services.

== History ==
Seat Holders
1946	57 male seat holders
1950	296 male seat holders
1960	594 male seat holders
1970	1,016 male seat holders

The congregation became affiliated with the United Synagogue in 1946, becoming a district synagogue in 1952 and subsequently a constituent (member) synagogue. The congregation has previously been called the Stanmore and Canons Park District Synagogue and the Canons Park & District Hebrew Congregation.

The current building (Main Shul) was consecrated on 18 March 1951 by Dayan Dr I. Grunfeld and Isaac Wolfson Esq. The synagogue was built facing north rather than east (towards Jerusalem). The community centre was consecrated on 8 September 1963. The Freeman Susman Hall (above the community centre) is bigger than the main synagogue. The corridor between the main synagogue and the community centre was widened in an extension in 2002. As part of the extension a garden was established at the front of the building. A lift was added to the building in 2008 to enhance accessibility; and in 2014 the main shul was refurbished as well as half of the classrooms to create a Beit Midrash known as Beit Mordechai.

== Clergy ==
The following individuals have served as the main rabbi of the congregation:

Ordinal	Officeholder	Term start	Term end	Time in office	Notes
1	S. M. Warshaw	c. 1950	c. 1951	0–1 years	
2	Avrom Simon Chaitowitz	1954	1986	31–32 years	
3	Dr. Jeffrey Cohen	1986	January 2006	19–20 years	Also an author
4	Mendel Lew	2006	February 2025	18–19 years	

Stanmore and Canons Park Synagogue also employs a community rabbi and a youth rabbi, and has rabbinic members who fill in as needed - especially on the high holy days.

== Youth activities ==
Stanmore and Canons Park Synagogue is well known for its youth activities. Stanmore provides a huge variety of programmes for the youth of the community. This includes trips, plays, youth clubs, Jewish Learning and external groups. Stanmore is also well known for its "Learn To Lead" programme, which is now also used in Bushey, Radlett, Edgware and many other communities following its enormous success in Stanmore.

A range of clubs during the week that take place in the community centre or the "Youth Lounge". As for Jewish learning, the synagogue runs a Beit Midrash programme where sixth formers can pair up with older Chavrutahs to learn texts or discuss issues.

Learn to Lead is an extensive programme where young people are given the opportunity to run the activities for the younger children. This starts with weekly sessions then the Learn to Lead Israel Trip (February Half term year 9), the Prague Trip (February half-term, year 10), the Leadership Weekend and finally the Tribe Poland Trip. The programme is linked closely with Tribe and many of the leaders Stanmore produces go on to lead in other communities. Stanmore's various trips are usually connected with Tribe (Tribe Poland Trip). Year 9–13 participates in the Tribe Football Frenzy.

== See also ==
- History of the Jews in England
- List of Jewish communities in the United Kingdom
- List of synagogues in the United Kingdom
