= Hamilton Tovey-Tennent =

Scottish army officer in the East India Company

- Born: 20 August 1782; Garrigheugh, Comrie, Perthshire
- Died: 4 March 1866 (aged 83)
- Occupation: Army officer

Hamilton Tovey-Tennent (20 August 1782 – 4 March 1866) was a Scottish army officer in the East India Company.

== Biography ==
Tovey-Tennent was born at Garrigheugh, Comrie, Perthshire, on 20 August 1782. He was the second son of John Tovey of Stirling, by his wife Hamilton, daughter of Sir James Dunbar of Mochrum and Woodside, third baronet, and judge-advocate of Scotland. He was educated at Stirling, and on 28 December 1798 received the commission of lieutenant in the Bombay military service. In 1801 he was posted to the 24th regular native infantry at Goa, and was employed on active service against the Mahrattas. In 1805, while serving under Lord Lake at the siege of Bhurtpore, he was severely wounded in an assault on the town. On 17 January 1811 he received the commission of captain. In 1813 he was placed in command of Ahmednuggar, and appointed brigade major at Poona. After more service against the Mahrattas, he was appointed in 1819 private secretary to Mountstuart Elphinstone, governor of Bombay. He was promoted to the rank of major on 19 January 1820, and accompanied Elphinstone on his tour through the province till November 1821, when he was compelled by the effect of his wounds to return to England. He retired from the service on 24 April 1824, being promoted to the rank of lieutenant-colonel. In 1832 he succeeded to the estates of his cousin, James Tennent of Pynnacles, Stanmore, Middlesex, and of Overton, Shropshire, and assumed his surname and arms. He died without issue, at Pynnacles, on 4 March 1866. In 1836 he married Helen, only daughter of General Samuel Graham, lieutenant-governor of Stirling Castle. Tovey-Tennent was a large contributor to charitable objects. Among other gifts he presented a site for a new church at Stanmore in 1854, and contributed 1,000l. to erect a school at Stirling. He was succeeded in his estates by his nephew, James Tovey-Tennent.
