= St Gregory's Priory, Canterbury =

Monastery in Kent, England

St Gregory's Priory at Canterbury was an English house of the Augustinian Canons Regular. Its foundation is attributed to Lanfranc, archbishop of Canterbury in the 11th century.

Subsequent to the Reformation Parliament and the Act of Supremacy, the priory was dissolved in 1535 during the Dissolution of the Monasteries of the English Reformation. Its last prior was John Symkyns, elected 1535.
