= Stanmore Country Park, Bridgnorth =

Country park in Shropshire, England

Coordinates: 52.5326°N 2.3830°W

Stanmore Country Park
- Interactive map of Stanmore Country Park
- Type: Country park
- Location: Shropshire, England, UK
- OS grid: SO7402292857
- Area: 100 acres (40 ha)
- Created: 1994
- Operator: Shropshire Council
- Status: Open
- Nearest Village: Stanmore, Bridgnorth

Stanmore Country Park (officially Stanmore Camp Countryside Site) is a 100-acre (40 ha) country park in Stanmore, Shropshire, 1.2 miles (2 km) east of Bridgnorth. Created in 1994 on the former site of RAF Bridgnorth, the park is run by the Shropshire County Council and contains an RAF memorial to those killed who were stationed at the military camp.

== Recreational activities ==
Walking is one of the main recreational activities in this area; there are 80 acres of woodland and meadow with pathways open to the public, consisting of easy circular walks with suitable terrain for pushchairs and wheelchairs. Some of the pathways and the car park has recently been resurfaced.

There is a picnic area near the free main car park, and three radar-operated kissing gates have been installed next to the main pedestrian entrances to the park. Their installation was made possible by funding from The Big Lottery. These radar gates allow large wheelchairs, and mobility scooters to access the park with the possession of a radar key.

== History of the site ==
In the past (1939–63) Stanmore was an RAF camp for basic training of new recruits; the site also provided accommodation for 3,500 trainees, and 800 staff. Now the only remaining building is the boiler-house chimney stack, which serves as a RAF memorial to those stationed at the camp who were killed. This memorial was restored in April 2013 which includes a plaque honouring the men who worked in the RAF; this restoration coincided with the celebration of the 50th anniversary of the closure of the camp. Both old and modern buildings now form part of an industrial estate. The rest of the station has been transformed into a countryside site, with thousands of trees replacing huts and parade grounds.

== Wildlife ==
The derelict land was planted with thousands of trees, which have grown to provide important woodland habitat complete with grassy areas and developing scrub habitat. This habitat provides valuable areas for mammals such as bank and field voles, rabbits and foxes. Bird feeders and nestboxes have encouraged a range of birds including tawny owls, sparrowhawks and green woodpeckers.
