= St John the Evangelist, Great Stanmore =

Anglican church in Harrow, Greater London, England

Coordinates: 51°36′58″N 0°18′56″W

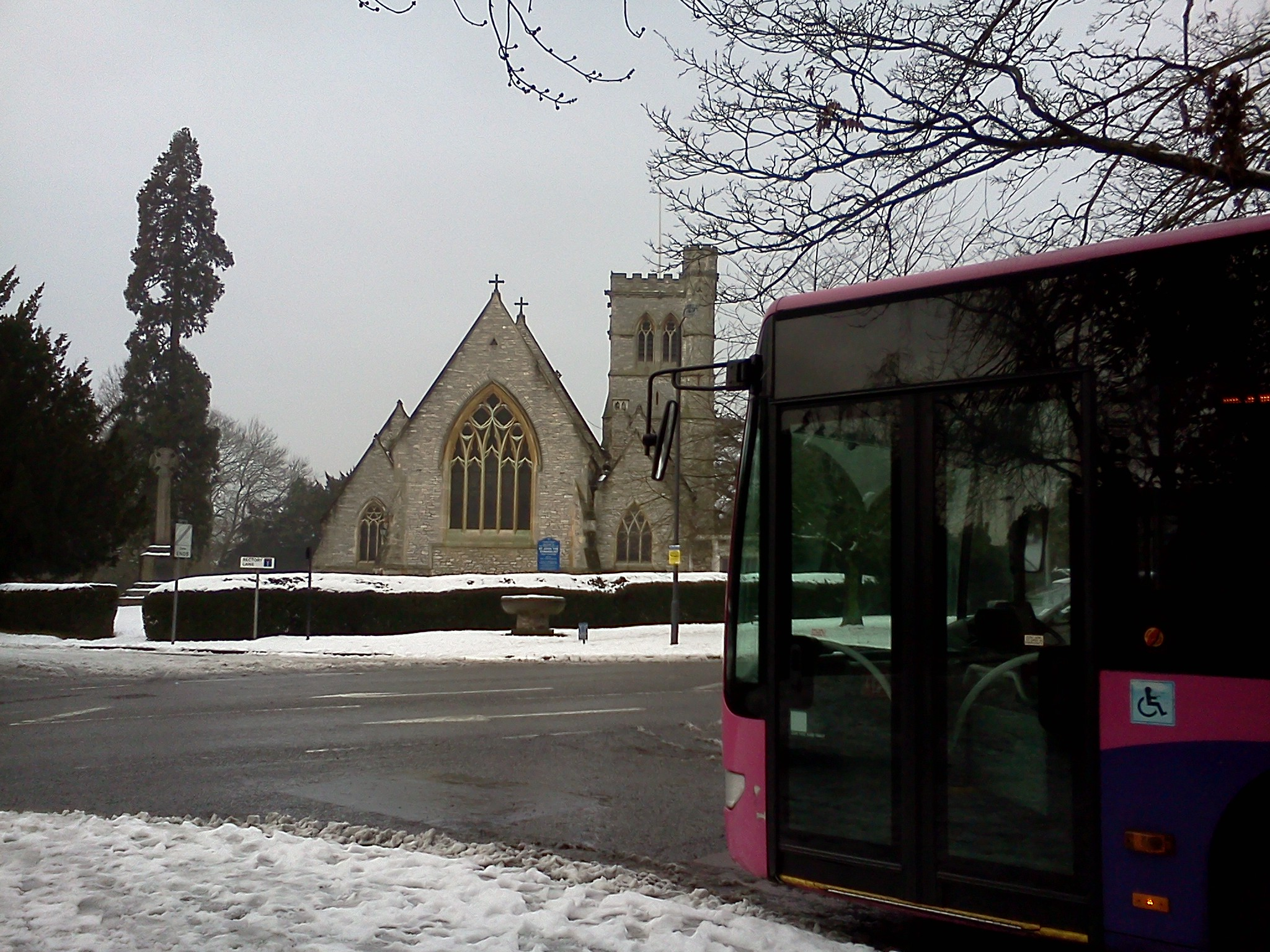
The current Stanmore church.

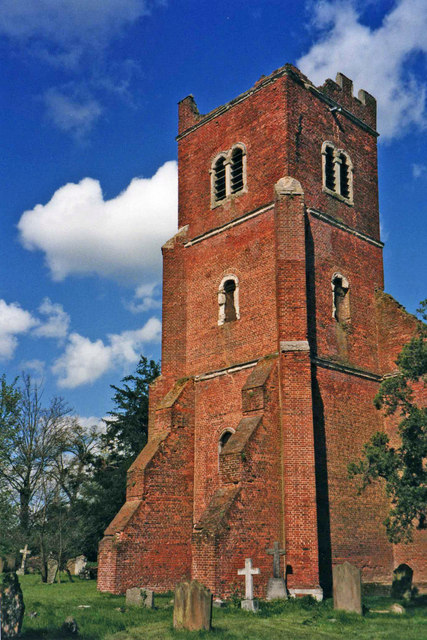
The ruined tower of the 1632 church.

St. John the Evangelist Church, Great Stanmore is an Anglican church located in Great Stanmore (now simply Stanmore), in Harrow, Greater London, England.

The name has been held by two churches: a red-brick church dating to 1632, now abandoned and in ruins, and its replacement, a stone church dating to 1850, which remains in use. Both buildings are separately Grade II* listed.

== History ==
The original Stanmore church, located on Old Church Lane, was consecrated in the name of St. Mary. It remained the village church until 1632, when it was replaced. It was later taken down, although some faint images that were assumed to show its tower are known from landscapes of the area. (Note: Bell shows some images with a church tower in the distance and suggests that they show St. Mary's tower, but the Scott article does not specifically show St. Mary's as having one.) As of the late twentieth century, a single tomb survived in the back garden of a local house.

The 1632 church, located nearer to what had become the village centre, was paid for by merchant Sir John Wolstenholme (Note: Sources consulted for writing this article do not clearly say whether this means Sir John Wolstenhome the elder or his son.) and consecrated by William Laud, then Bishop of London. It is in red brick.

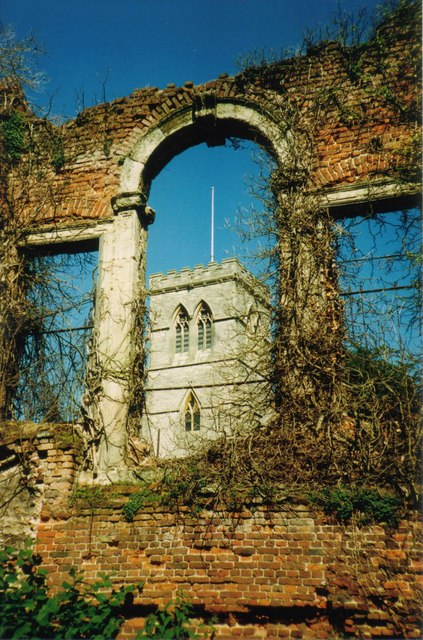
The 1850 building seen through the ruin of the 1632 building.

With growing population and changing artistic tastes, a third church building was constructed in 1850. The 1632 church was then partially demolished and became a ruin.

The present church is built of Kentish rag and Bath stone, and was designed in an Early Decorated Gothic style by the Surrey architect Henry Clutton. It was built by the Lambeth builder George Myers. The church of Saint Mary the Virgin in Ewell had just been completed by Clutton and formed a prototype for St John's. The new church cost £7,855; £1,000 of which had been donated by its rector, Douglas Gordon. Gordon was the son of George Hamilton-Gordon, the Earl of Aberdeen, who became Prime Minister two years later; his lordship had also donated £2,000 and would ultimately be buried at the church. It was consecrated on 16 July 1850 by the Bishop of Salisbury, Edward Denison.

The land on which the church stands was donated by Colonel Hamilton Tovey Tennent. The foundation stone for the new church was laid by the Earl of Aberdeen in the presence of Queen Adelaide, the widow of King William IV. The former queen was living at Bentley Priory at the time, and this was her last public appearance. Queen Adelaide donated the font to the church and the east window was later dedicated to her memory.

Burials at the church include the Earl of Aberdeen in a family vault, and writer W. S. Gilbert and his wife Lucy Agnes.

== Bibliography ==
- Scott, Peter G. (Ed.) (2000) The Parish Church of Saint John the Evangelist, Hartest Productions.
