= Stanmore Common =

Nature reserve in Greater London, England

Coordinates: 51.63°N 0.33°W

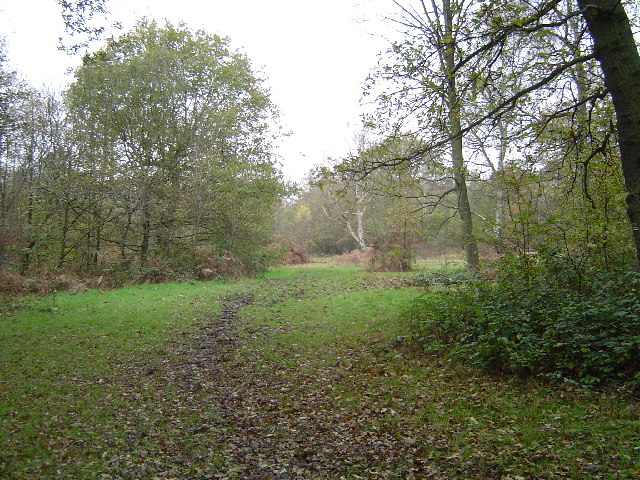
Stanmore Common

Stanmore Common is a 49.2-hectare public park, Local Nature Reserve and Site of Metropolitan Importance for Nature Conservation in Stanmore in the London Borough of Harrow in England. It is owned by Harrow Council and managed by the council with a local group. It was a biological Site of Special Scientific Interest, but was de-notified in the early 1990s.

== History ==
There are several important archaeological sites on the common, including Bronze Age tumuli. In 793 AD land at Stanmore was given by the King of Mercia to St Albans Abbey, which held it until the Norman Conquest. Following the Great Stanmore Inclosure Act 1813 (53 Geo. 3. c. 11 Pr.) much of the land was lost to private ownership, but about 120 acres of Stanmore Common remained common land, held by Harrow Urban District Council.

== Ecology ==
The common is woodland and heathland, with two artificially created ponds. Most of the woodland is secondary as the ancient woods were long ago cleared for grazing, apart from a seven hectare area of older woodland at The Grove. The Common has many rare plant species, including the only heath spotted-orchids in London. Birds include the declining spotted flycatcher and bullfinch. There are also rare insects, and mammals include muntjac deer, woodmice, bank and field voles and shrews.

== Access ==
There is a car park on Warren Lane, and access also from The Common.
