= Stanmore =

Area of London, England

Coordinates: 51.618°N 0.314°W

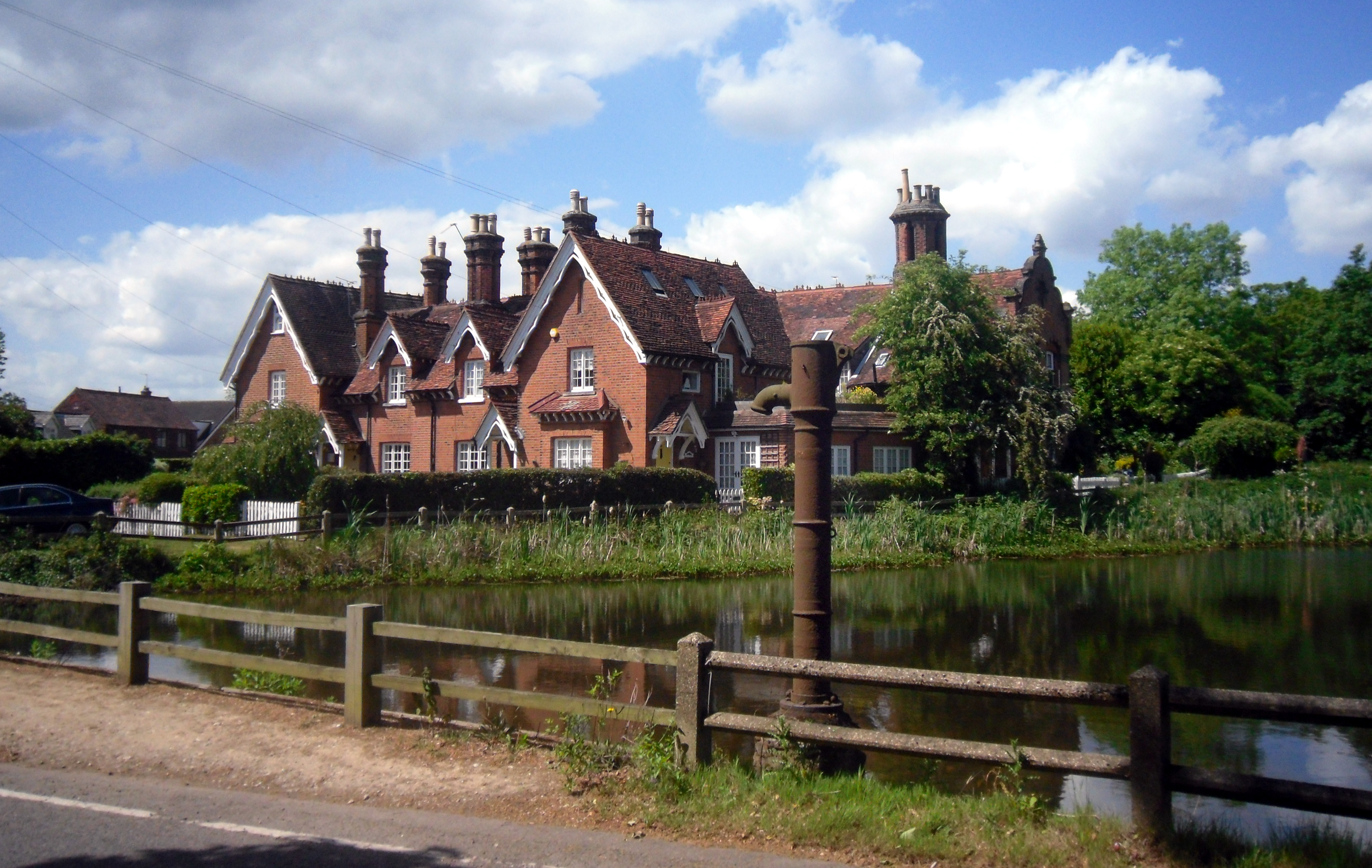
- Pump at one of the Roman-era ponds at Little Common, which gave Stanmore its name

- Location within Greater London
- Population: 23,700 (Stanmore Park and Canons wards 2011)
- OS grid reference: TQ1691
- London borough: Harrow
- Ceremonial county: Greater London
- Region: London
- Country: England
- Sovereign state: United Kingdom
- Post town: STANMORE
- Postcode district: HA7
- Dialling code: 020
- Police: Metropolitan
- Fire: London
- Ambulance: London
- UK Parliament: Harrow East
- London Assembly: Brent and Harrow

Stanmore is part of the London Borough of Harrow in Greater London. It is centred 11 miles (18 km) northwest of Charing Cross, lies on the outskirts of the London urban area and includes Stanmore Hill, one of the highest points of London, at 152 metres (499 ft) high. The district, which developed from the ancient Middlesex parishes of Great and Little Stanmore, lies immediately west of Roman Watling Street (the A5 road) and forms the eastern part of the modern London Borough of Harrow.

Stanmore is the location of the former RAF Bentley Priory station – base of the Fighter Command during both world wars – along with its accommodating Bentley Priory mansion, notably the last residence of Queen Adelaide. Some members of the Bernays family were also based here, including Adolphus Bernays and his son and grandson who were both rectors of St John's church; the Bernays Institute and Bernays Gardens are public amenities in the centre of the old village.

The district increasingly developed into a London suburb during the 20th century, and in the latter half housed the Automobile Association's regional headquarters. Today it is a commuter town with a tube station that is the northern terminus of the Jubilee line, and with large green spaces including Canons Park, Stanmore Country Park, Stanmore Common and Bentley Priory, which are all in the Stanmore area.

== Toponymy ==
The place earliest documented use of the name comes from a charter of 793, when land in Stanmore was granted to St Albans Abbey. The Domesday book of 1086 records the two manors of Stanmore as Stanmere, the name deriving from the Old English stan, 'stony' and mere, 'a pool'. There are outcrops of gravel on the clay soil here and the mere, which gave the manors their name, may have been one of the ponds which still exist. One possible candidate is a pond on Stanmore Common still sometimes known as Caesars Pond after a battle believed to have taken place in the vicinity in 54BC.

== History ==
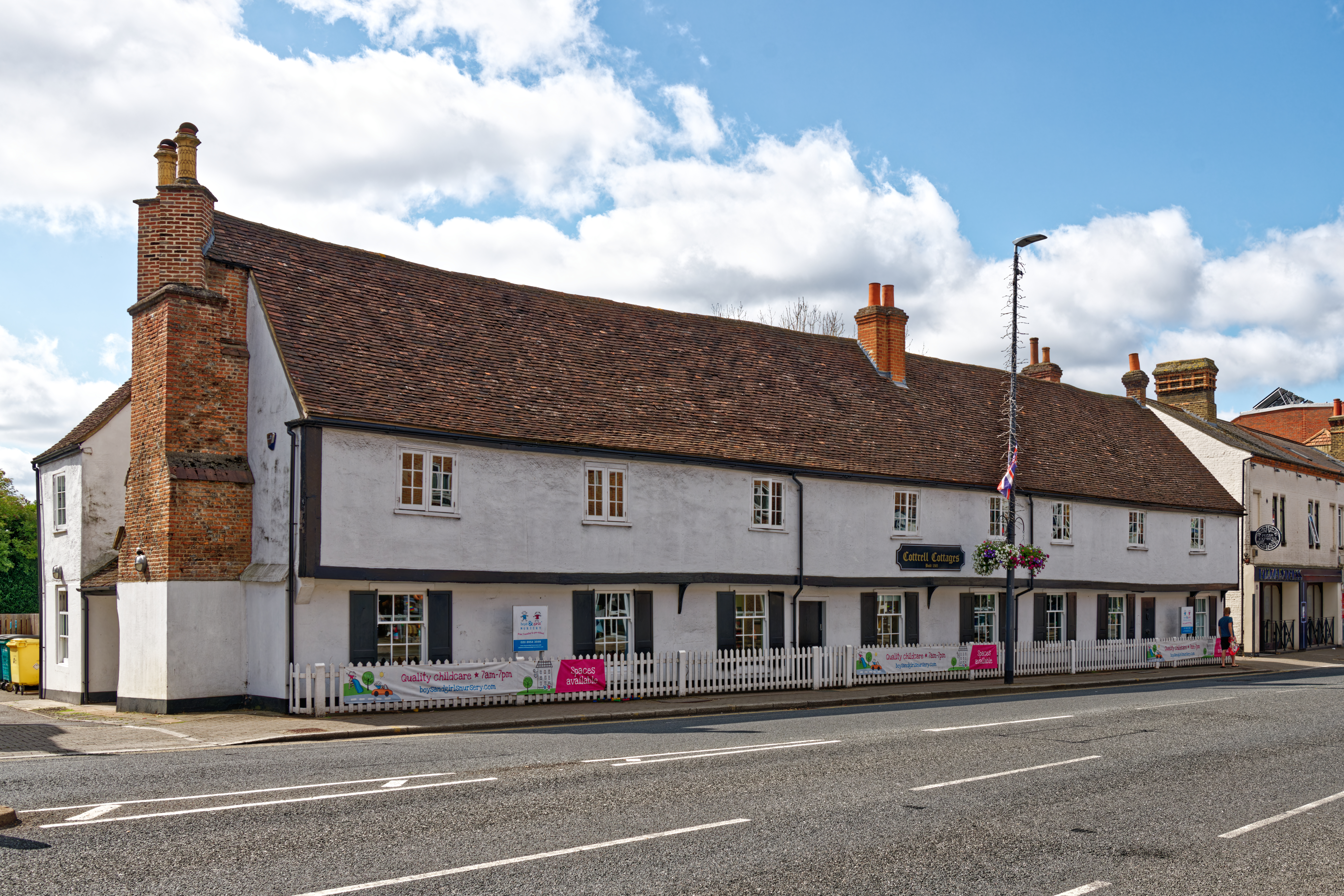
Cottrell Cottages, The Broadway (16th century)

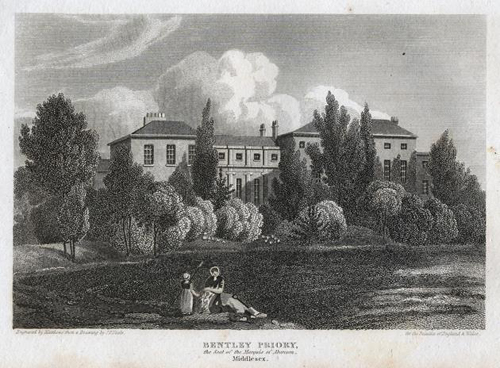
Bentley Priory (c.1800)

=== Rome ===
An obelisk on Brockley Hill, in the grounds of the Royal National Orthopaedic Hospital, marks the reputed site of a battle between Julius Caesar's Roman legions and the local Catuvellauni tribe, under Cassivellaunus. This battle is said to have taken place during Caesar's raid in force on Britain, in 54BC. Britain was conquered after Claudius invaded in 43AD; sometime after this the Romans established a local settlement called Sulloniacis.

=== Origins of the Manors and Parishes of Stanmore ===
A manor called Stanmore is first recorded in 793 AD, and the Domesday book of 1086 describes pre-existing manors (estates) of Great and Little Stanmore as having changed ownership in the aftermath of the Norman Conquest. These estates were subsequently served by the ancient parishes of Great and Little Stanmore.

=== Pre-urban ===
Until the late 19th century, Stanmore was a small rural community. In the Middle Ages, a monastic community of cell of Augustinian Canons was established at Bentley Priory. It was dissolved in 1536 during the dissolution of the monasteries. One of the really old surviving buildings are the Cottrell cottages built c. 1565. It suggests that the medieval population centre in Stanmore was around the present day Broadway, before the developments among Stanmore Hill in the late 18th.

=== Stately homes ===
Between 1713 and 1724, the 1st Duke of Chandos built Cannons house in Little Stanmore. Shortly after, in 1729 Andrew Drummond, the founder of the Drummonds Bank. Drummond was the fifth son of Sir John Drummond, a Jacobite. In 1745, Andrew was investigated and exonerated for any Jacobite dealings. Andrew Drummond purchased Stanmore House and the Stanmore Park estate as his country residence which was situated 11 miles from Drummond Bank in Charing Cross. A new mansion was built for Andrew Drummond at Stanmore Park in 1763: it was designed in neo Palladian style by John Vardy and Sir William Chambers. Zoffany painted the Drummond family in the grounds. The Drummonds leased Stanmore House to the Countess of Aylesford (in 1815) and later to Lord Castlereagh.

The Marquess of Abercorn acquired the estate, along with Bentley Priory, in 1839. In 1848, Stanmore House was sold again to George Glyn, 1st Baron Wolverton. The house was later used as a boys' preparatory school. It was demolished in 1938 and the site was taken over by the Royal Auxiliary Air Force as the headquarters of Balloon Command. The history of the area is reflected in street names, such as Lady Aylesford Avenue and Abercorn Road. RAF Stanmore Park closed in 1997 and is now a housing estate.

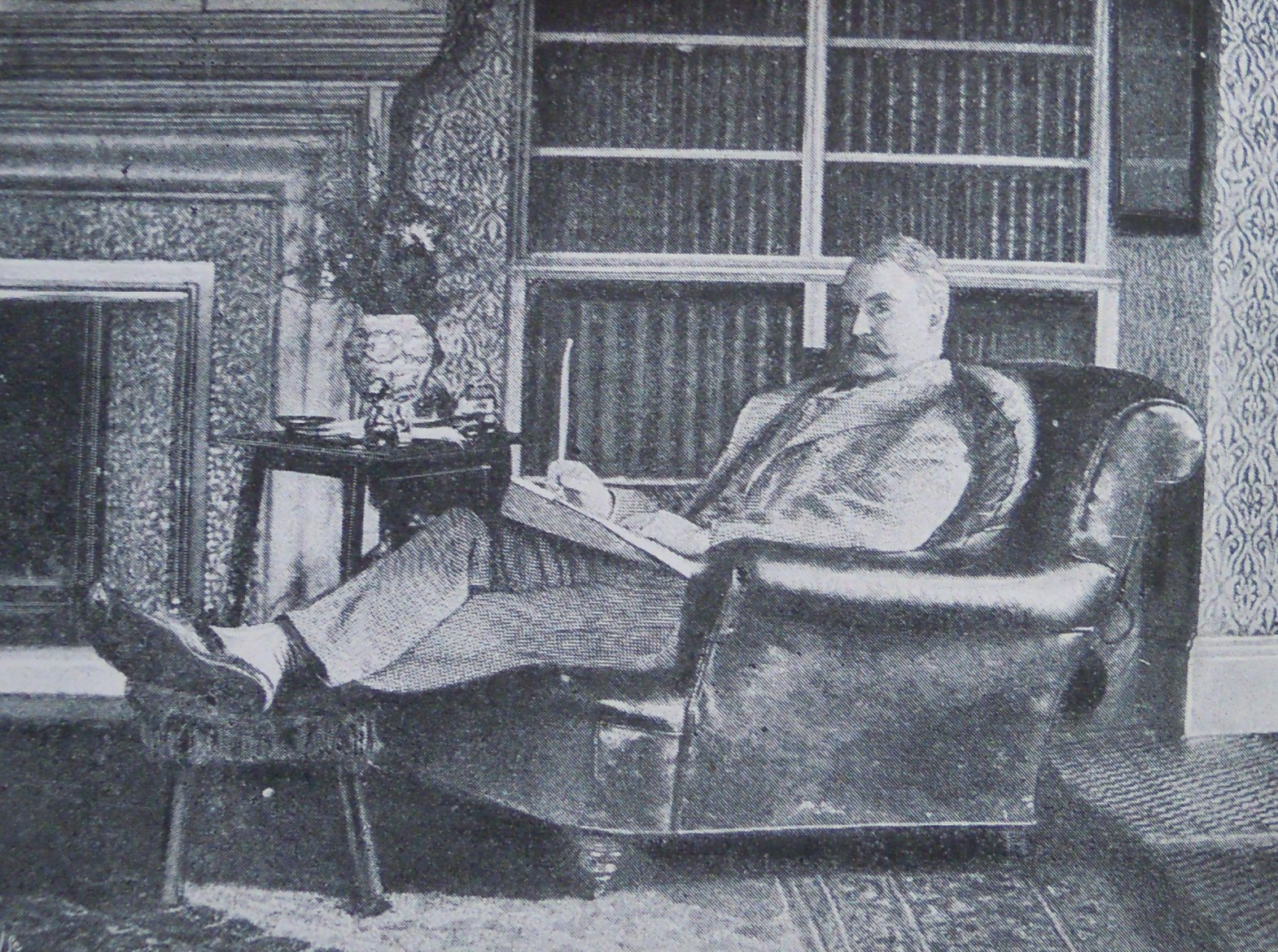
Opera librettist W. S. Gilbert in the library at Grim's Dyke (1891)

The wealthy businessman James Duberley commissioned Sir John Soane to design a large mansion house north of the original Bentley Priory in 1775. This house was added to throughout the eighteenth and nineteenth centuries by various owners. It was significantly extended in 1788, again by Sir John Soane, for John Hamilton, 1st Marquess of Abercorn. The Priory was the final home of the Dowager Queen Adelaide, queen consort of William IV, before her death there in 1849. In 1882 Bentley Priory was acquired by the hotel millionaire Frederick Gordon, who turned it into a country house hotel for wealthy guests.

The opera librettist W. S. Gilbert (of the Gilbert and Sullivan duo) lived at Grim's Dyke, a country house located between Stanmore and Harrow Weald. In 1911, Gilbert drowned in the pond at Grim's Dyke. He was cremated at Golders Green and his ashes buried at the churchyard of St. John's Church, Stanmore.

=== Urbanisation ===
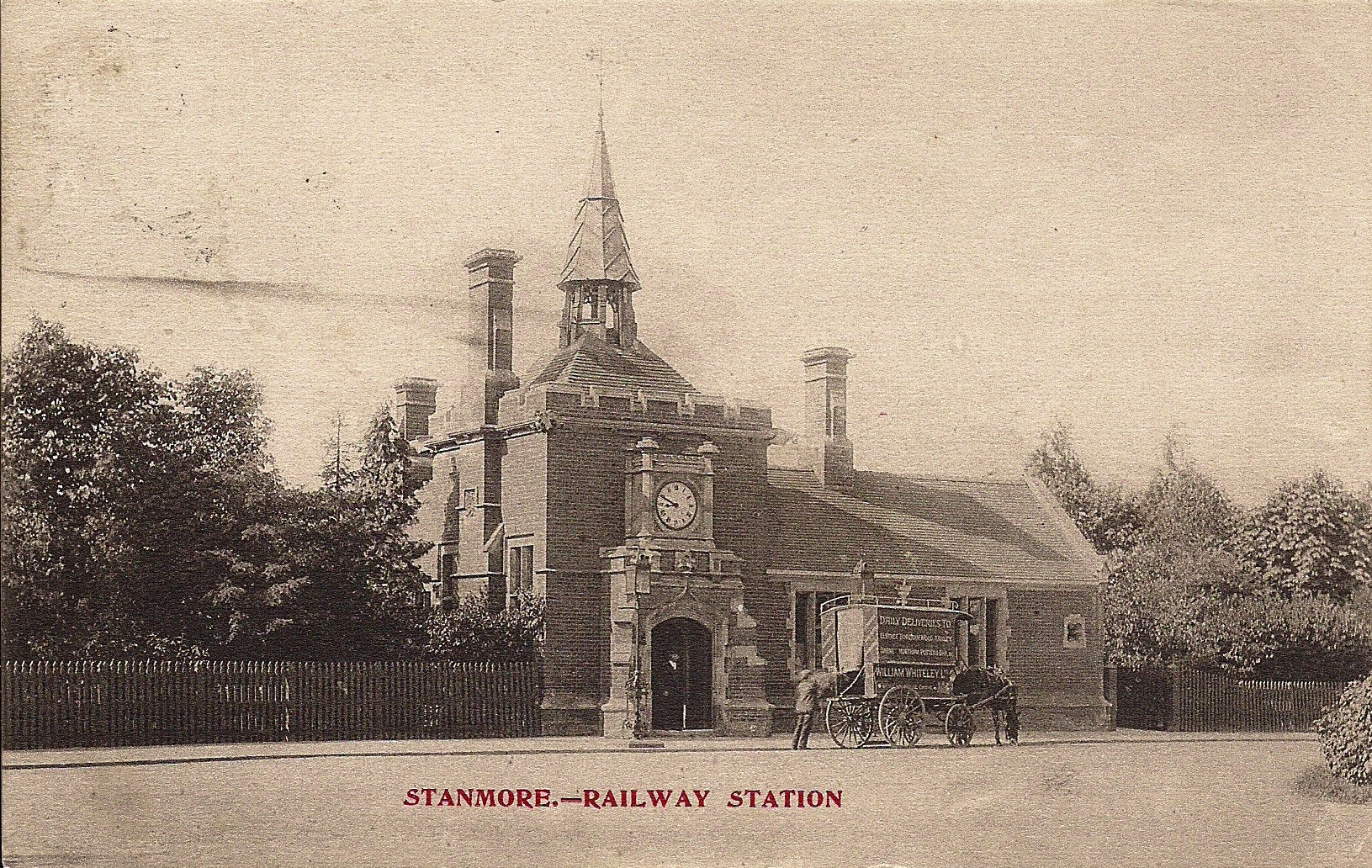
Stanmore Village railway station

The railways first reached Stanmore in 1890 when Frederick Gordon opened the Stanmore branch line to improve access to Bentley, in the hope of attracting more affluent customers. Great Stanmore Parish Council stipulated that Gordon's new station building should be of the highest quality, and so Stanmore station (later renamed Stanmore Village) was designed to resemble a small English church, complete with a spire and gargoyles. Trains were run by the London and North Western Railway (LNWR). Gordon also purchased land near the station and laid out a wide avenue—named Gordon Avenue—lined with new superior houses, in the hope of attracting wealthy Londoners to come to live in the country and commute into the city on his new railway. Despite his efforts, Gordon's business ventures at Stanmore were not successful, and in 1899 he sold the railway to the LNWR. Gordon died in 1904 at his Hotel Metropole in Cannes. His body was brought back to Stanmore and buried in the family grave at the church of St. John's Church.

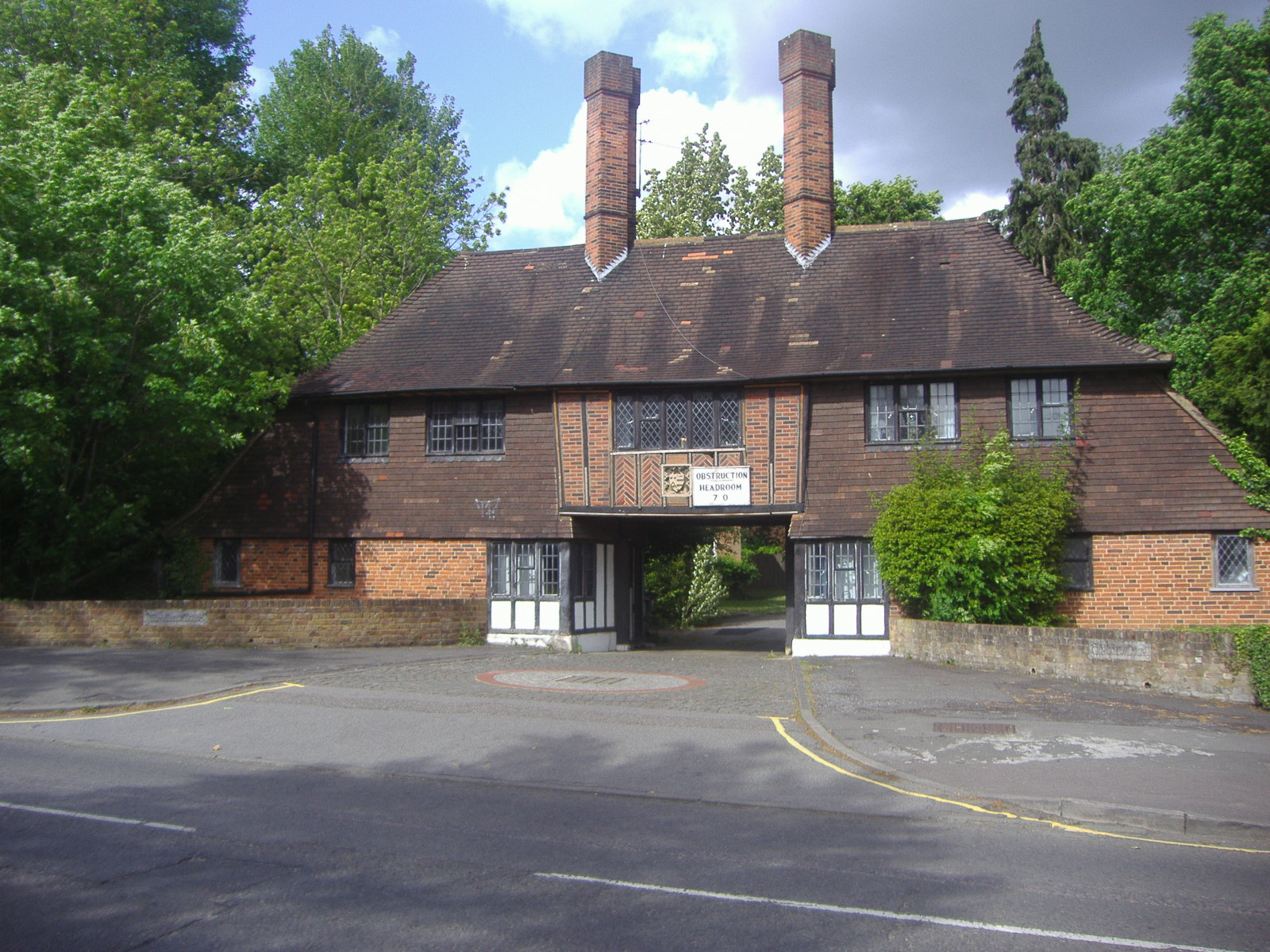
The manor house on Old Church Lane built in 1930, separate from an older manor house nearby

In the early years of the 20th century, as the population of London grew, Stanmore was affected by increasing urbanisation and the small rural village was rapidly becoming a suburb of London. In December 1932 the Metropolitan Railway (MR) opened a new electric railway with a station at Stanmore (now the London Underground station on the Jubilee line). This rapid, direct route into London presented strong competition for Gordon's old railway (by now run by the London, Midland and Scottish Railway (LMS)), especially as branch line passengers had to change trains at Harrow & Wealdstone for London services. After years of decline, Stanmore Village station was closed by British Railways in 1952.

=== The war and afterwards ===
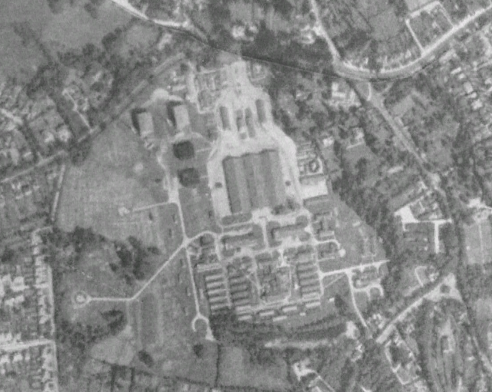
Aerial shot of RAF Stanmore Park (1945)

During World War II, Stanmore played an important role. Stanmore had an outstation from the Bletchley Park codebreaking establishment, where some of the Bombes used to decode German Enigma messages were housed. Bentley Priory was taken over by the RAF, and in 1940 the Battle of Britain was controlled from RAF Bentley Priory. RAF Bentley Priory closed in 2009.

In the 1950s the Automobile Association built and opened a four-storey office building on The Broadway which eventually became the AA regional headquarters for London and the South East. A major employer in Stanmore, the centre once handled up to 3,000 calls a day. In 1986 the AA moved a few hundred yards to a new building on The Broadway. The abandoned building eventually became derelict and a target for vandalism, graffiti and the dumping of rubbish. There were plans to build a shopping centre at the site, but they did not go ahead, leaving the building abandoned for several years with its windows broken before it was demolished in 1993. The site lay empty for several years before Sainsbury's secured its development of a supermarket here, opening at the end of 1999.

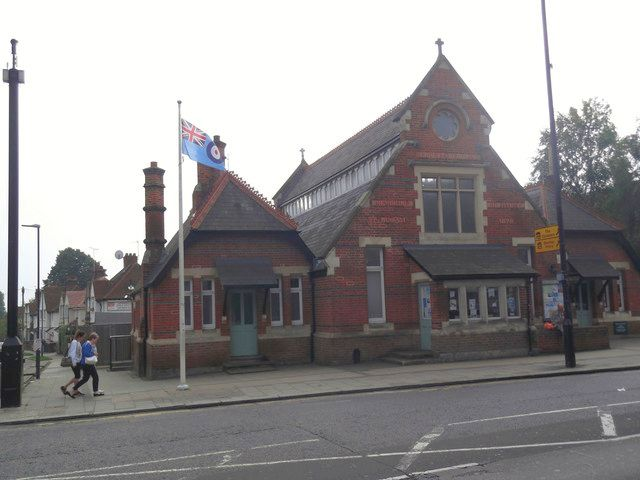
Bernays Institute, a parish hall erected by Rev. Leopold Bernays

Bernays Memorial Institute survived demolition and was restored during a period of 18 years until 2009. However, the AA call operating centre closed in 1997 when it moved its base to Basingstoke, and in January 1999 it was announced that the breakdown centre would close with the loss of 140 jobs, ending the firm's long association with Stanmore. After being sold by the AA the building was used by Carpetright and as offices.

=== Parish church ===
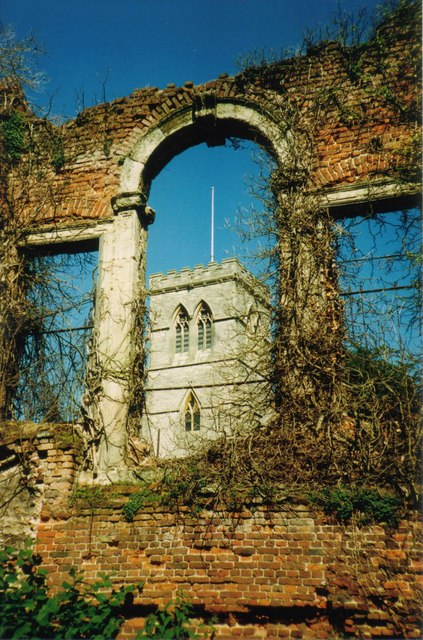
The Church of St John the Evangelist (1850), seen through the ruin of the 1632 building

The first parish church was the 14th-century St Mary's, built on the site of a wooden Saxon church, which itself may have been built on the site of a Roman compitum shrine. It has now completely disappeared; one tomb survives in a back garden.

This building was replaced by a new one built in the current churchyard, consecrated in 1632 and dedicated to St. John the Evangelist. Built of brick and consecrated by Archbishop Laud, it is one of the relatively small number of churches built in Britain between the medieval period and the eighteenth century. By the nineteenth century, this church had become considered outdated and unsafe. After its replacement, its roof was pulled off and it became a ruin.

A new church was constructed in the Gothic Revival style from 1849 to 1850. Queen Adelaide's last public appearance was to lay the foundation stone of the new church. She gave the font and when the church was completed after her death, the east window was dedicated to her memory.

=== Stanmore Hall ===
Built in the 1840s, Stanmore Hall is a Grade II* listed building built as a gothic castle. Located on Wood Lane near the top of Stanmore Hill, Stanmore Hall was developed by Matthew John Rhodes and was owned by balloonist Robert Hollond and his wife Ellen Hollond, who lived for the rest of their lives at the residence. The interiors were redesigned by William Morris later that century. William Knox D'Arcy resided at the Hall, where he died in 1917. One of the pioneers of the oil exploration business, D'Arcy's funeral was attended by dignitaries and celebrities, carrying his coffin from the hall through the village to St John the Evangelist for service.

After D'Arcy's death Stanmore Hall was sold and no longer used as a family home. During the Second World War it was used by Allied Expeditionary Air Force, and after the war until 1971 it was a nurse's home for the Royal National Orthopedic Hospital.

Stanmore Hall has been used as a filming location, such as the British films Frankenstein Must Be Destroyed, Nothing but the Night, 1960s series The Avengers and later ITV's The Professionals.

Following neglect, the structure of the building deteriorated, and it received damage by a fire in 1979. Eventually in 1998 the Hall was converted into separate luxury dwellings by a developer.

== Modern Stanmore ==
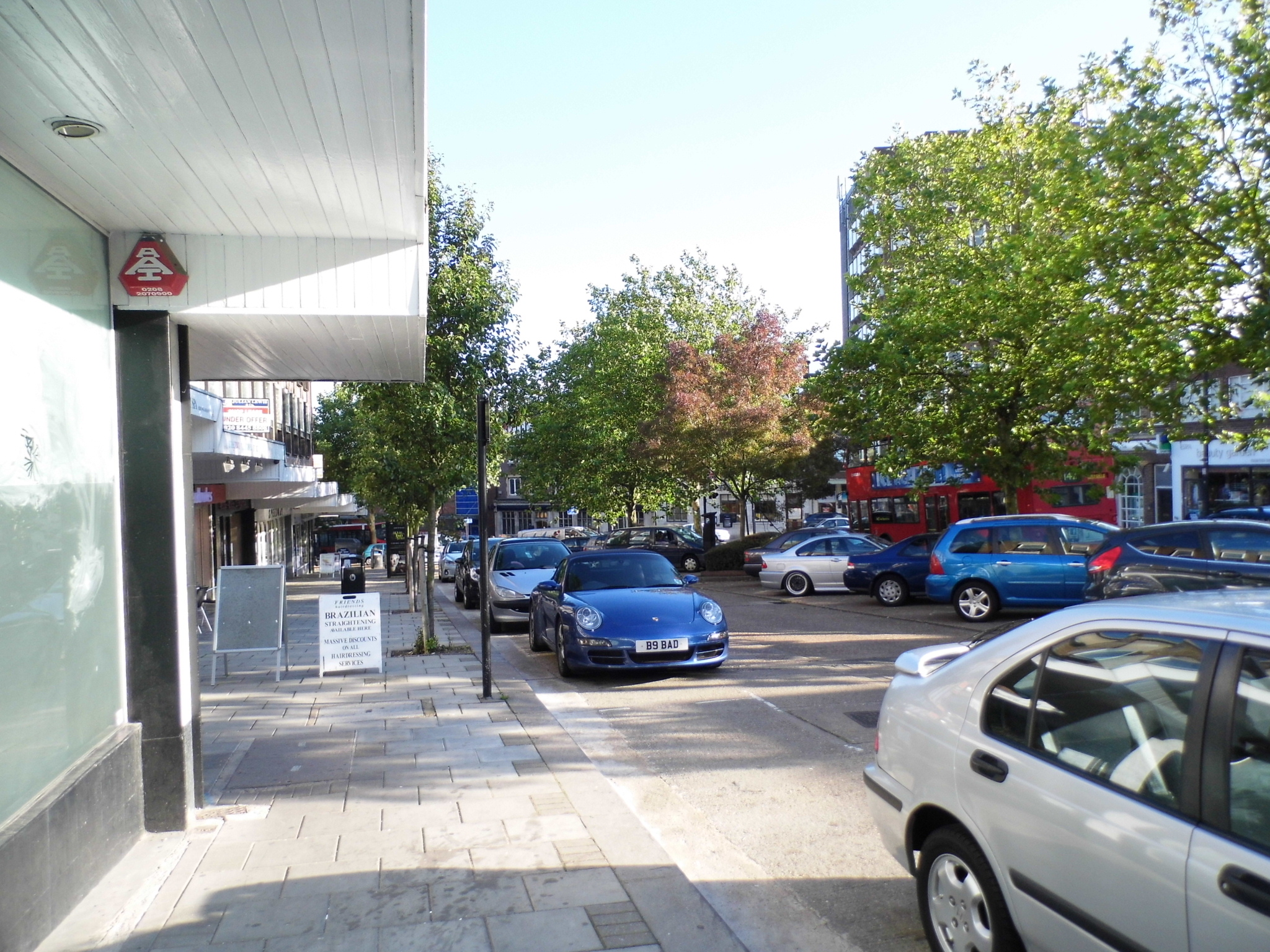
A view of Stanmore Broadway

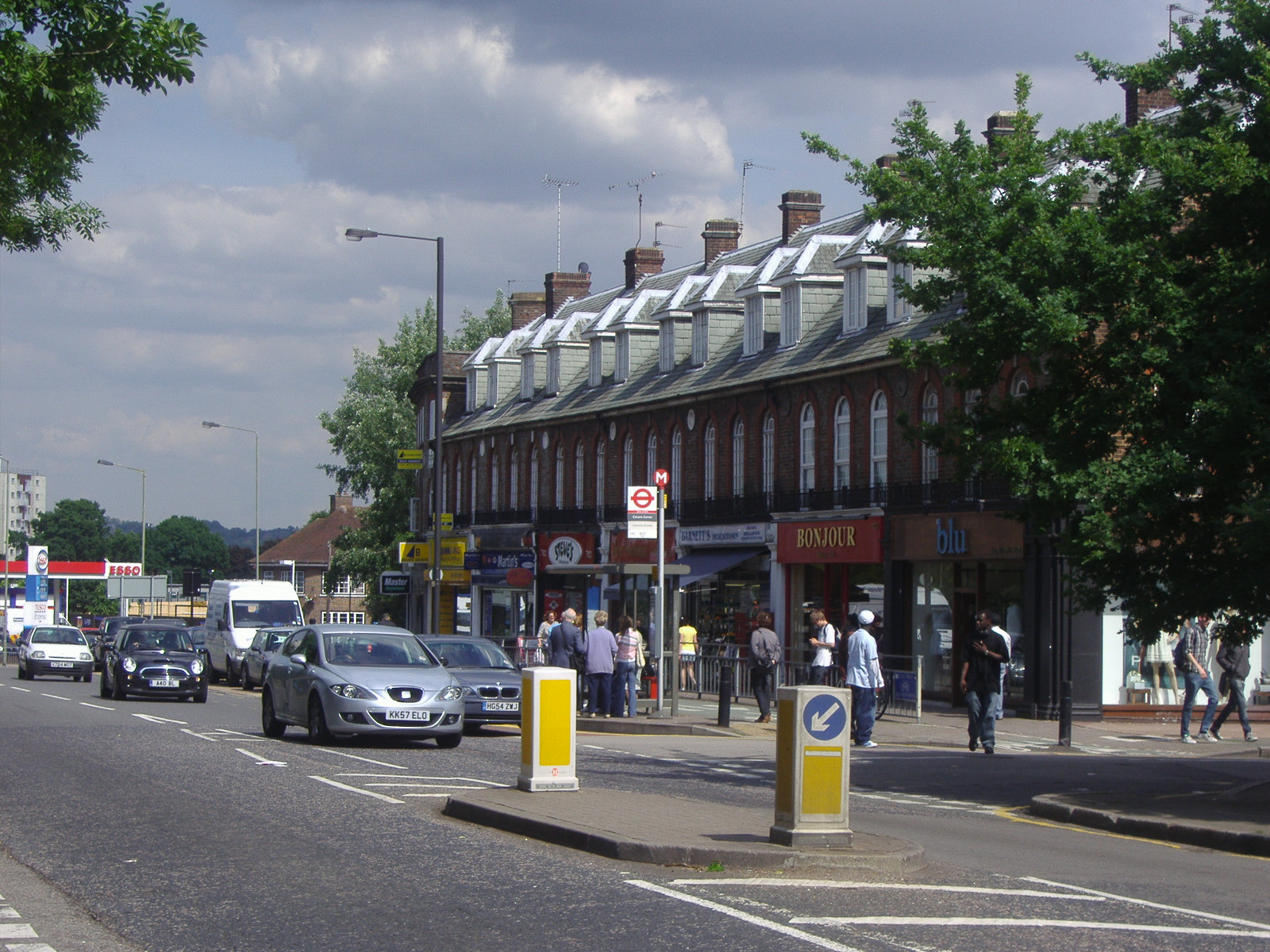
A view of London Road near Canons Corner

Many of Stanmore's residents commute to jobs in central London, contributing to the affluent character of the area.

=== Shopping and hospitality ===
Central Stanmore includes a range of shops, pubs and restaurants from small independent businesses to large chains.

=== Open spaces ===
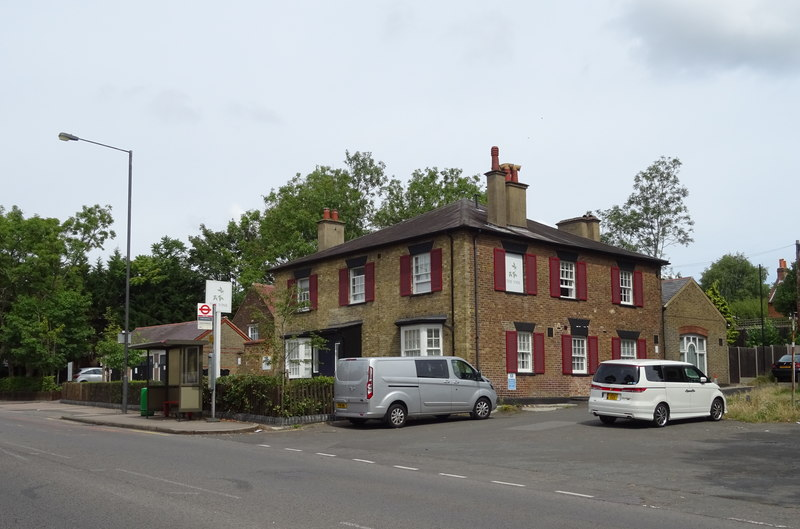
Former Vine public house, Stanmore Hill

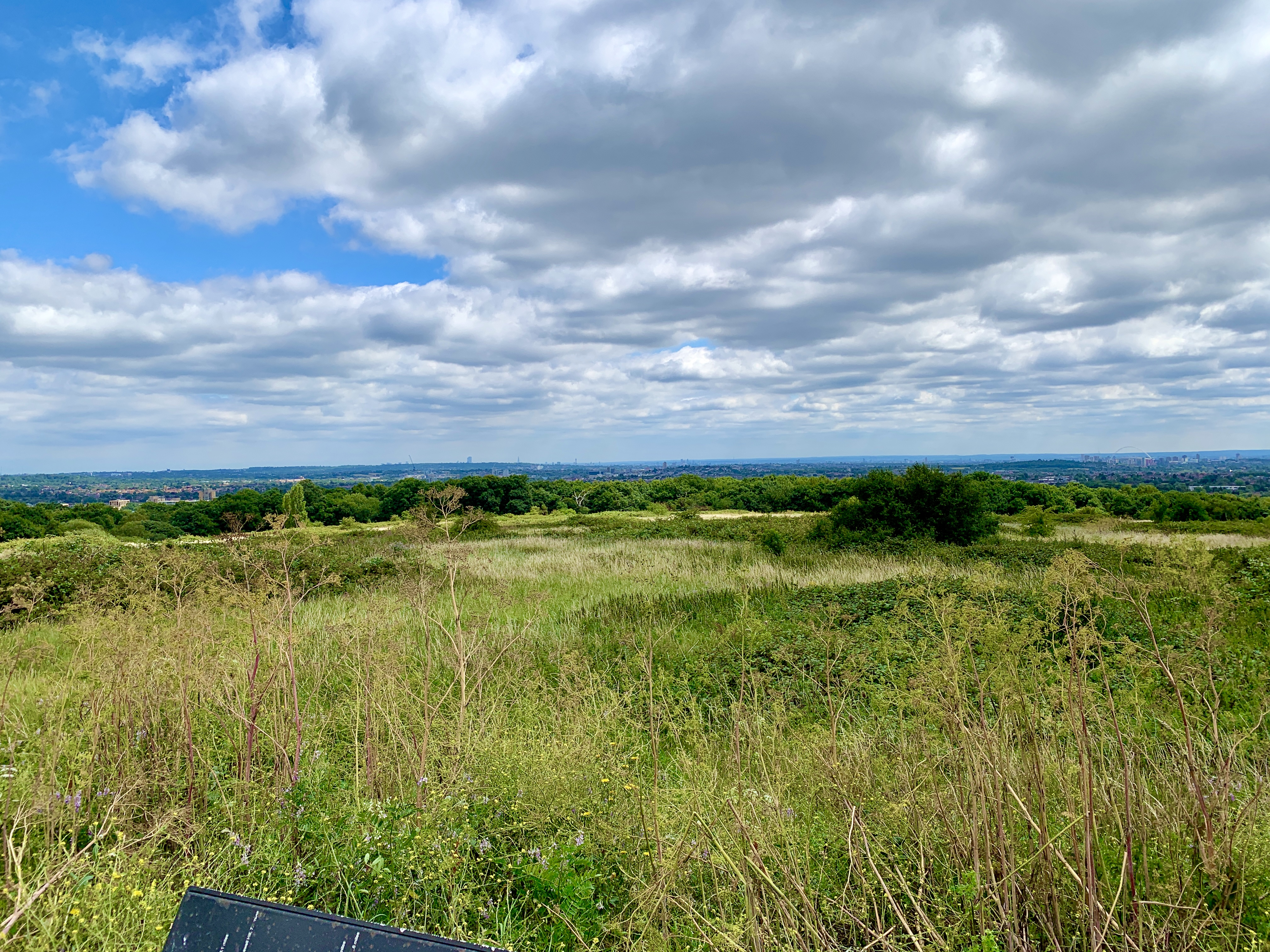
Stanmore Country Park

Stanmore Park is at the foot of Stanmore Hill and right next to the local library. Bentley Priory Nature Reserve, Stanmore Common and Stanmore Country Park are larger parks and nature reserves. Travel and excursion to these places and other attractions such as the Bernays Gardens are promoted by the Stanmore Tourist Board.

Further south is Stanmore Marsh. These 4 hectares (9.9 acres) of wetlands with grassland and woodland ran dry before a restoration project was completed in 2017. Here a tributary of the Stanburn Brook becomes the Edgware Brook when it leaves the marsh travelling east towards Edgware.

=== Sports clubs ===
On the border with Bushey is Stanmore Cricket Club, one of the oldest in the Middlesex county championship league, which celebrated 150 years in 2003. The club has nurtured two famous cricketers who have played tests for England in the last two decades: Angus Fraser and Mark Ramprakash.

=== Schools ===
Stanmore is home to Avanti House Primary and Secondary Schools, St John's Church of England School, Park High School, Bentley Wood High School, Stanmore College and the North London Collegiate School.

=== Health ===
The suburb also hosts the Royal National Orthopaedic Hospital – known as RNOH – which is famed for its spinal unit and paediatric/young adult hip unit.

=== Housing ===
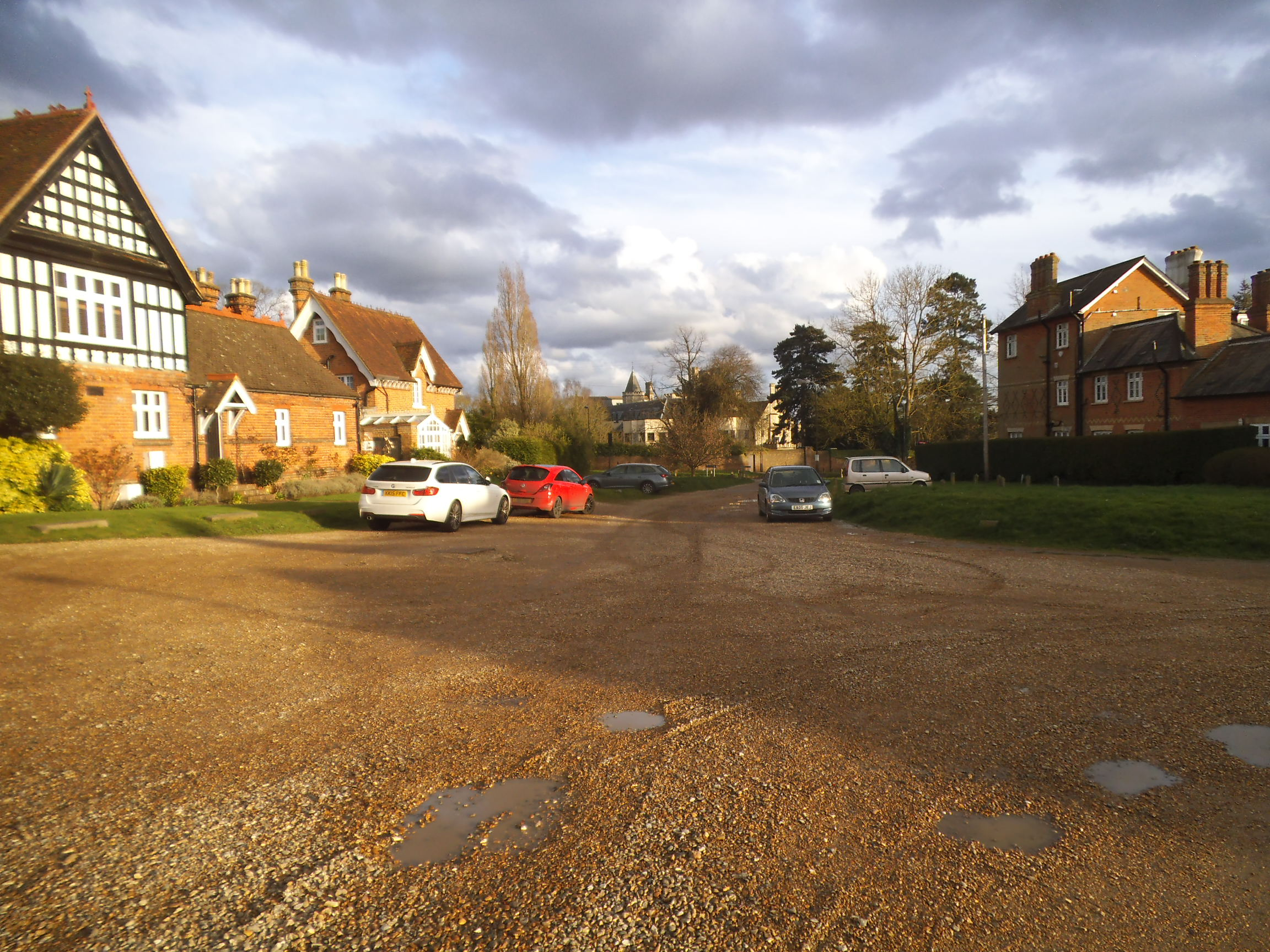
Housing in Little Common

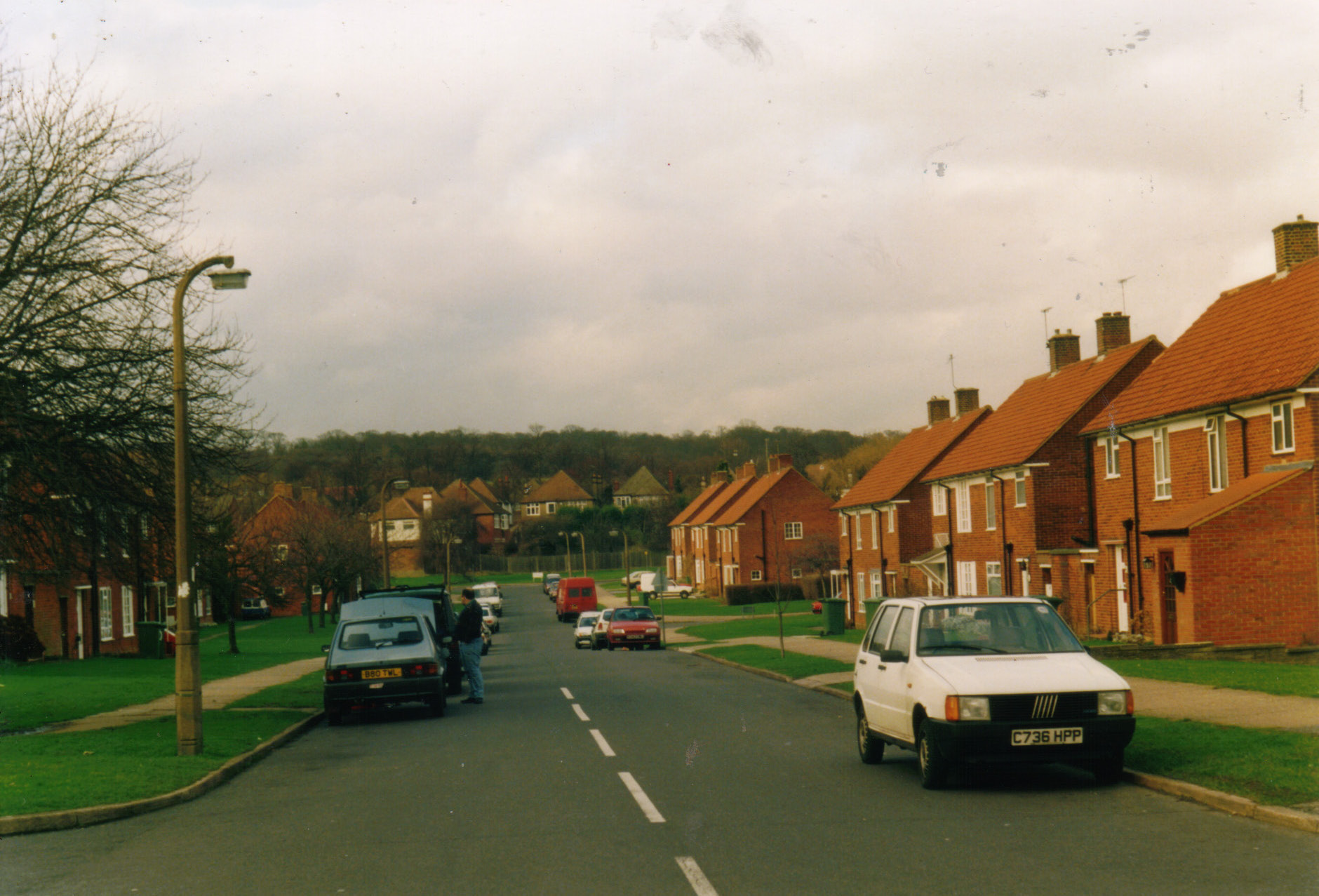
Housing in Morecambe Gardens

== Demography ==
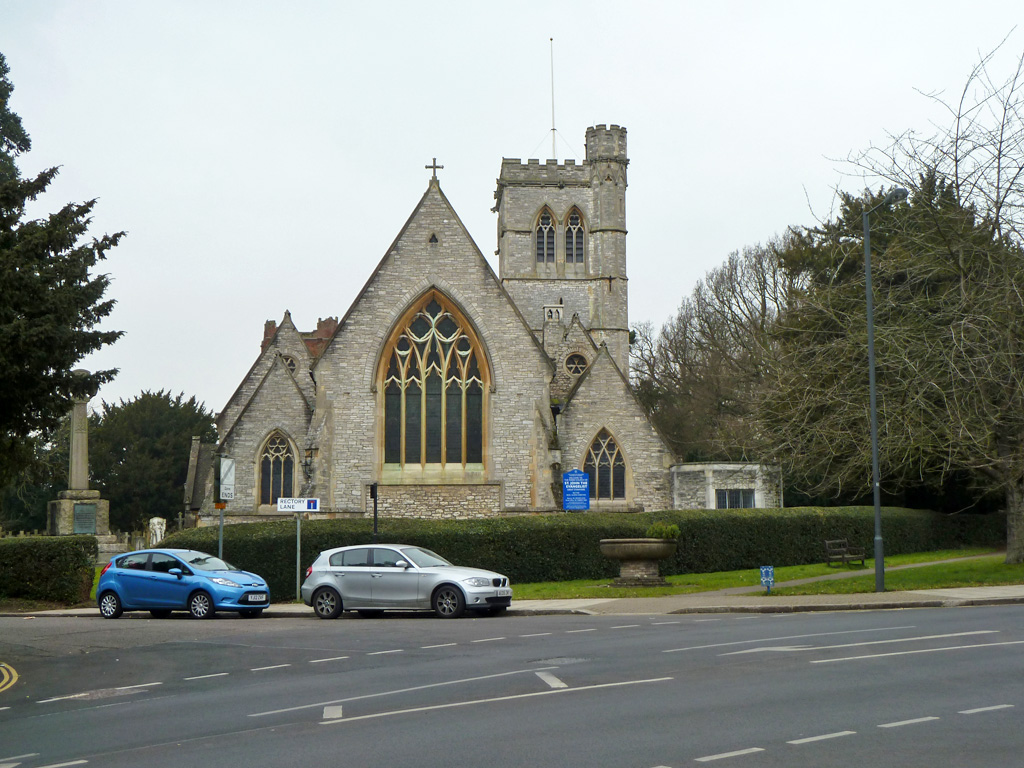
St John the Evangelist church

The population of the London Borough of Harrow ward (Stanmore Park) was 11,229 at the 2011 Census. The Canons ward which covers Stanmore railway station and eastern areas had a population of 12,471 at the same census.

Stanmore has Christian, Muslim, Hindu, Jain, and Jewish communities, including its local synagogue, Stanmore and Canons Park Synagogue on London Road (which has one of the largest memberships of any single synagogue in Europe and had the second largest in the UK behind Borehamwood, although more recently has been overtaken by a number of other London synagogues), an Islamic centre, KSIMC of London (Hujjat) and a new Hindu temple on Wood Lane.

The 2011 census showed that in Stanmore Park ward, 56% of the population was white (47% British, 7% Other, 2% Irish) and 20% Indian. 31% was Christian, 22% Jewish, 15% Hindu and 11% Muslim. Canons ward (covering eastern areas) was 52% white (40% British, 10% Other, 2% Irish) and 24% Indian. 26% was Christian, 25% Jewish, 18% Hindu and 11% Muslim.

== Politics ==
Stanmore is part of the Harrow East constituency for elections to the House of Commons of the United Kingdom.

Stanmore is part of the Stanmore ward for elections to Harrow London Borough Council.

On 1 April 1934 the civil parish of Great Stanmore was abolished to form Harrow. At the 1931 census (the last before the abolition of the parish), Great Stanmore had a population of 2688.

== Notable residents ==
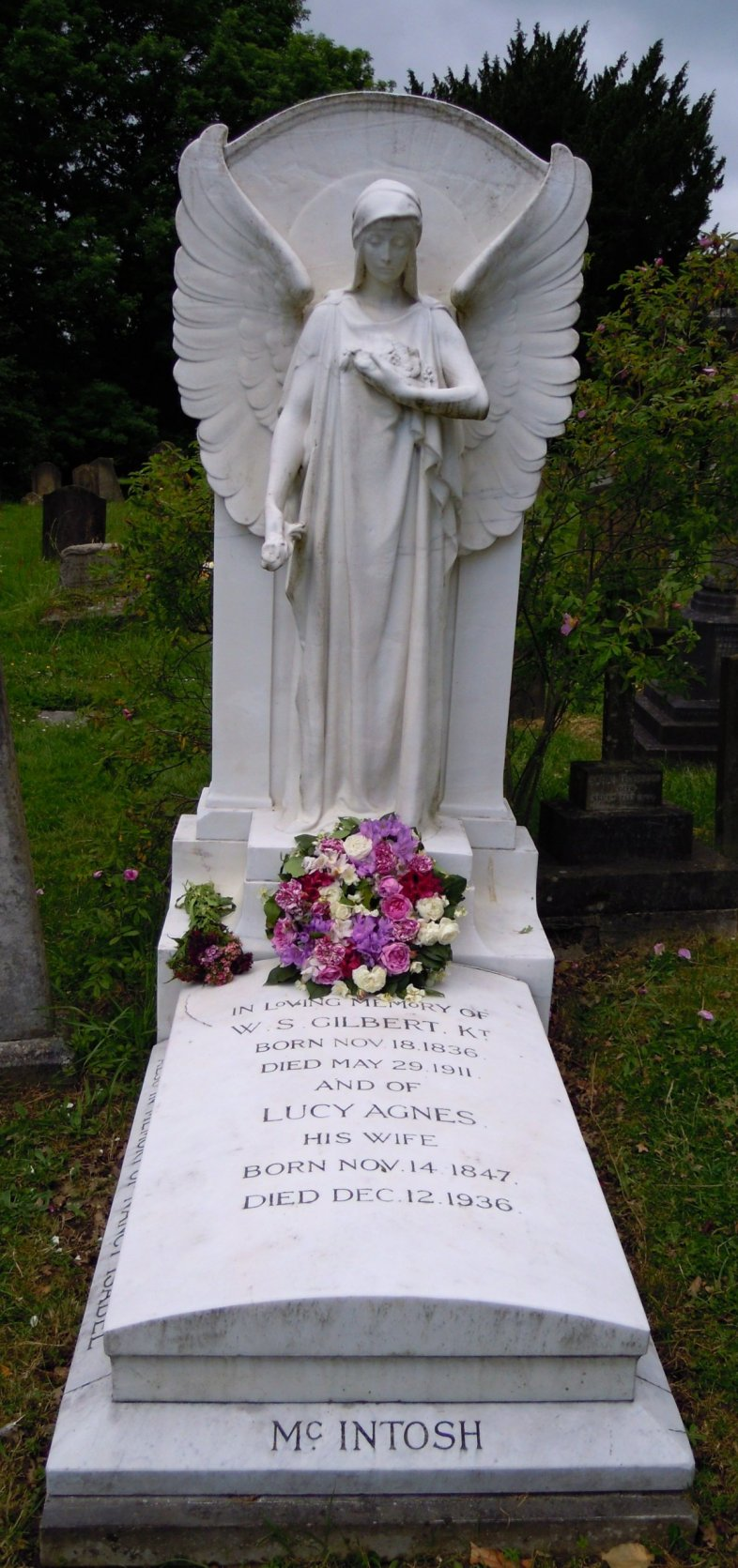
The grave of W. S. Gilbert at Stanmore

- Queen Adelaide (1792–1849), queen consort of William IV, lived at Bentley Priory, Stanmore from 1848 until her death.
- George Hamilton-Gordon, 4th Earl of Aberdeen, Peelite Prime Minister (in office December 1852 – February 1855) was raised and is buried in Stanmore
- Frederick Gordon, hotel millionaire and builder of the first Stanmore railway
- W. S. Gilbert, English dramatist, librettist and illustrator; lived at Grim's Dyke and died in the lake there. His ashes are buried in Stanmore.
- Robert and Ellen Hollond lived here. He was a balloonist and MP, and she founded London's first créche.
- Clement Attlee, Labour Prime Minister in the first post-war government, lived in a large villa "Heywood", later replaced by mid-rise apartments, along London Road, known as Heywood House.
- Chaz Jankel, singer and multi-instrumentalist, was born in Stanmore.
- Billy Idol, rock musician, was born in Stanmore.
- Mary Cholmondeley, Lady Delamere, heiress, born in Stanmore.
- Dave Bassett, football coach, was born in Stanmore.
- Clive Anderson, radio and television presenter, was born in Stanmore.
- Peter Van Hooke, drummer, grew up in Stanmore.
- Linda Hayden, actress, was born in Stanmore.
- Anthony Horowitz, screenwriter and author, was born in Stanmore.
- Cyril Shaps, actor, lived in Stanmore.
- Laurie Johnson, bandleader and composer, lived in Stanmore between 1962 and 2015.
- Roger Moore, actor, famous for his role as Simon Templar in The Saint and later as James Bond lived in Stanmore.
- Patricia Medina, actress, lived in Stanmore.
- Richard Greene, actor, most notable for his role as Robin Hood, lived in Stanmore when he was married to Patricia Medina.
- Theo Walcott, footballer, was born in Stanmore.
- William Knox D'Arcy lived at Stanmore Hall and died there.
- Keith Vaz, MP, (Lab) and his family lived in Stanmore (2005–2016).
- Olly Mann, co-host of cult podcast Answer Me This!, grew up in Stanmore.
- James Bord, professional poker player
- Bacary Sagna, footballer, lived in Stanmore until 2014 while at Arsenal FC.
- Jay Foreman, musical comedian, grew up in Stanmore.
- Beardyman (Darren Foreman), performer and musician, grew up in Stanmore.
- Matt Lucas, performer and comedian, was born in Central London but grew up in Stanmore.
- Alexis Sánchez, footballer, lived in Stanmore while playing for Arsenal F.C.
- Nikki Grahame, television personality and model, lived in Stanmore.
- Dolly Alderton, author, grew up in Stanmore.
- Edward Wilson (explorer) lived in Stanmore, with a house on Stanmore Hill
- Hugh Dowding, Air Chief Marshal and commander of RAF Fighter Command during the Battle of Britain
- Charles Drury Edward Fortnum of the Fortnum & Mason grocery dynasty lived in Stanmore for over forty years, and dedicated a window at St. John's Church in Stanmore in the memory of his wife, Fanny Matilda Keats
- George Frideric Handel, composer, became house composer at Cannons in Little Stanmore / St_Lawrence's Church, Whitchurch, Little Stanmore.

== Transport ==
=== Road ===
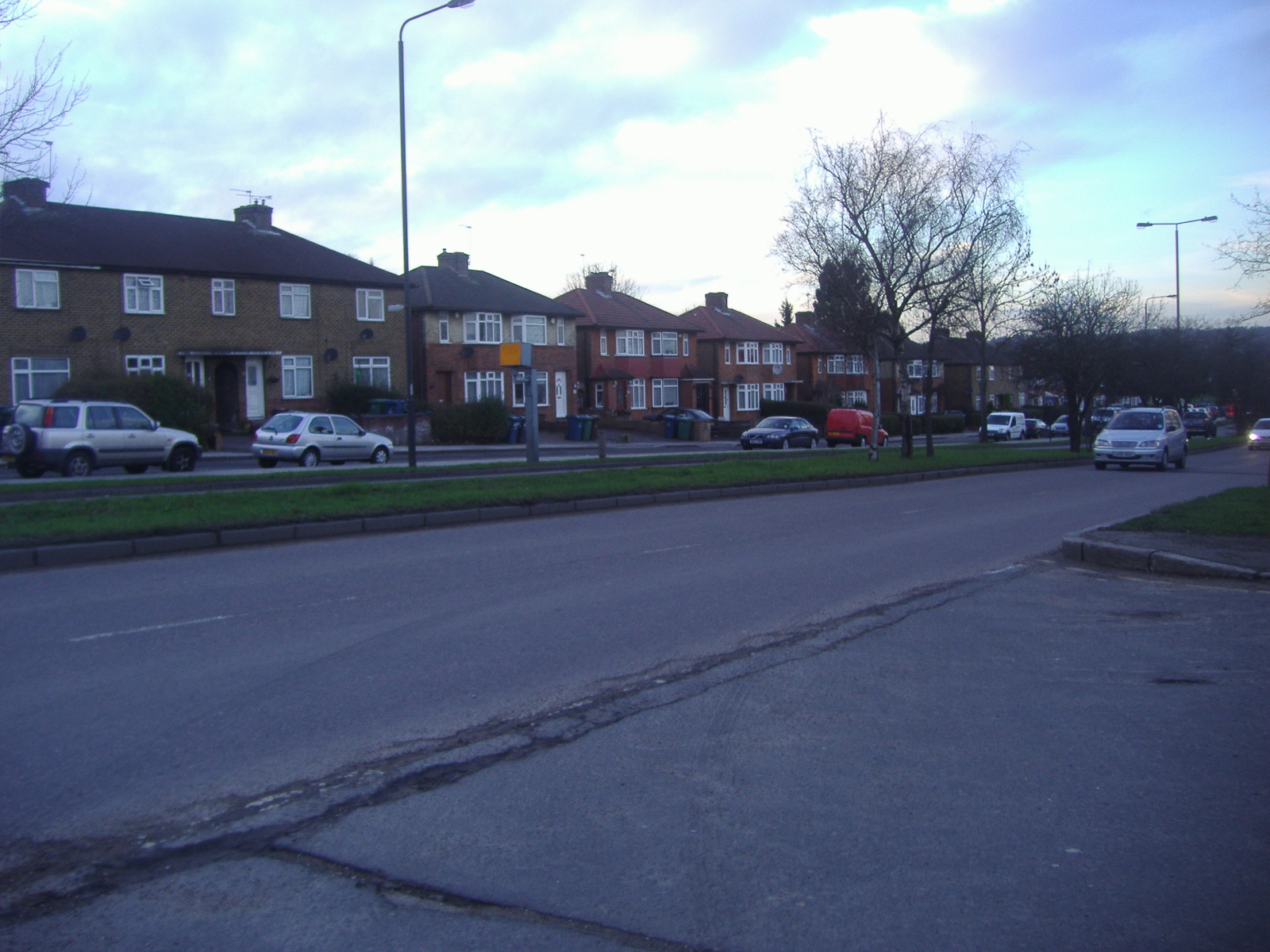
A view of Honeypot Lane (dual carriageway), an ancient Roman-era track

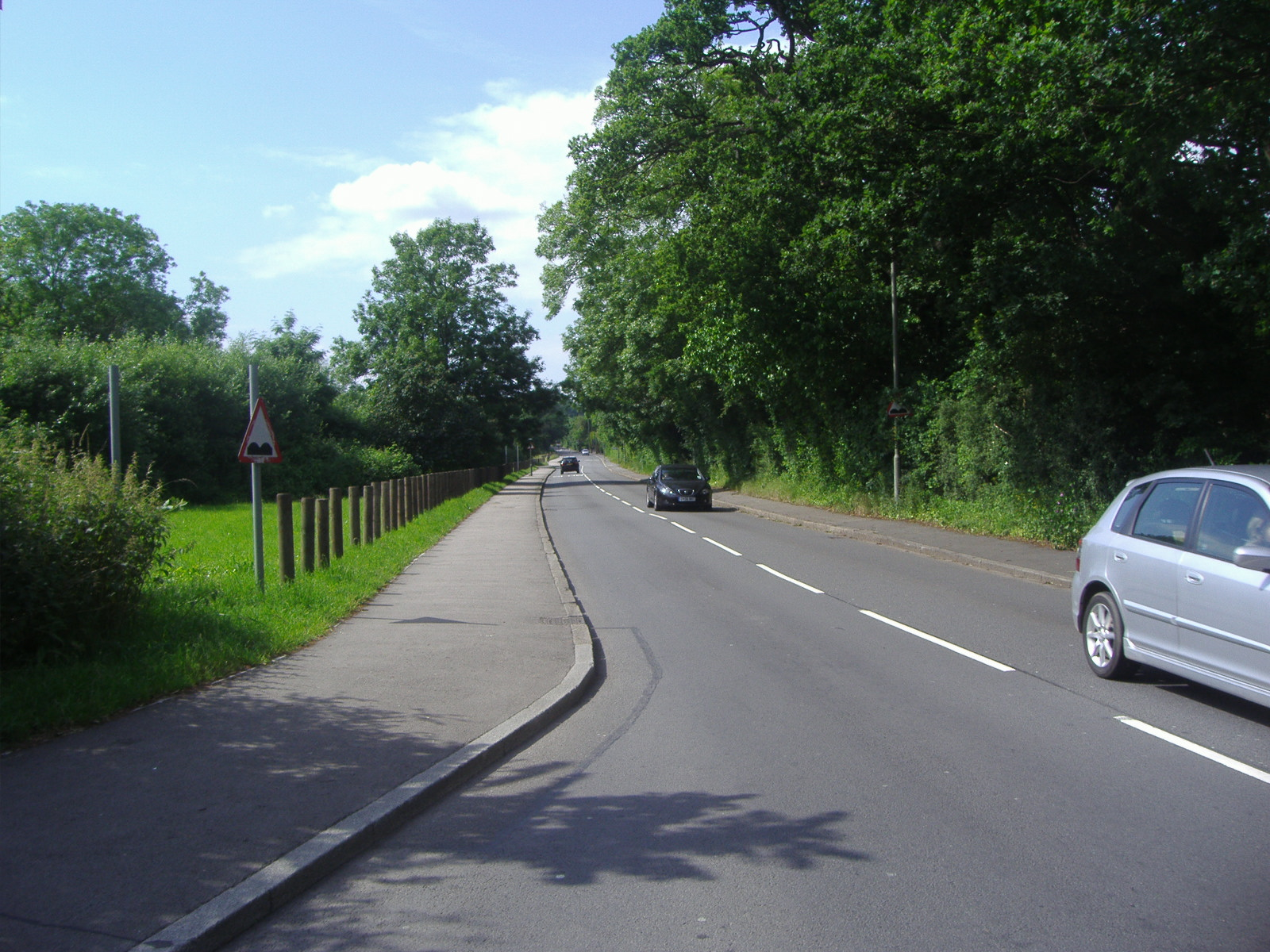
Brockley Hill, road towards RNOH and Elstree

The A410 (London Road/The Broadway/Church Road/Uxbridge Road) runs east–west across Stanmore. To the west it goes towards Harrow Weald and Hatch End. To the east it meets the A5 (Brockley Hill and Stonegrove) at Canons Corner roundabout providing a connection to the M1 motorway and Central London. A short distance east of that is a junction for the A41 trunk road. Marsh Lane and Honeypot Lane travel south towards Queensbury while Stanmore Hill/The Common travels towards Bushey Heath and on to Watford.

=== Nearby places ===
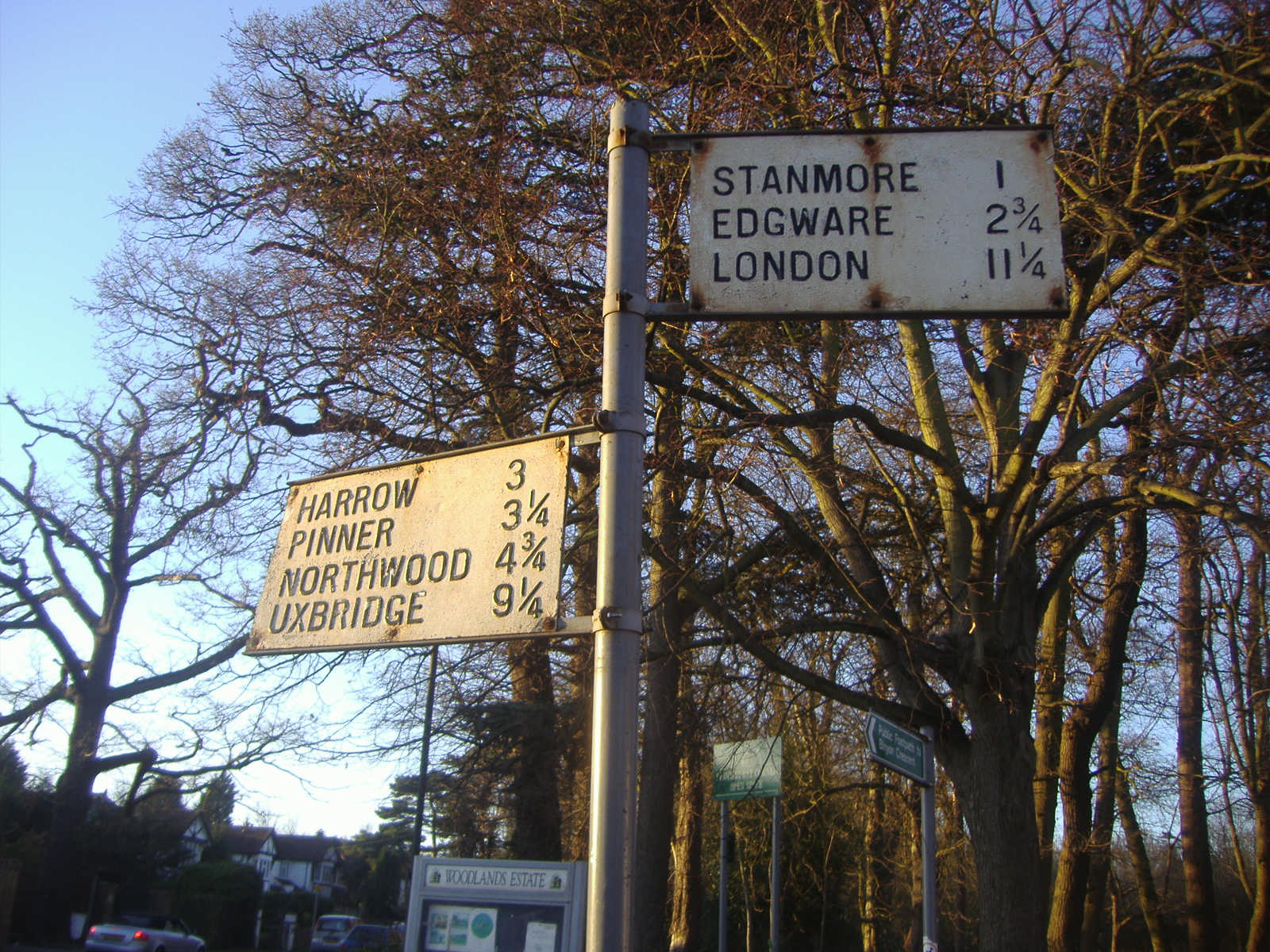
A historic directional sign in Clamp Hill in Stanmore – dismantled in 2010

- Elstree
- Borehamwood
- Edgware
- Bushey
- Watford
- Harrow Weald
- Belmont

=== Tube/Trains ===
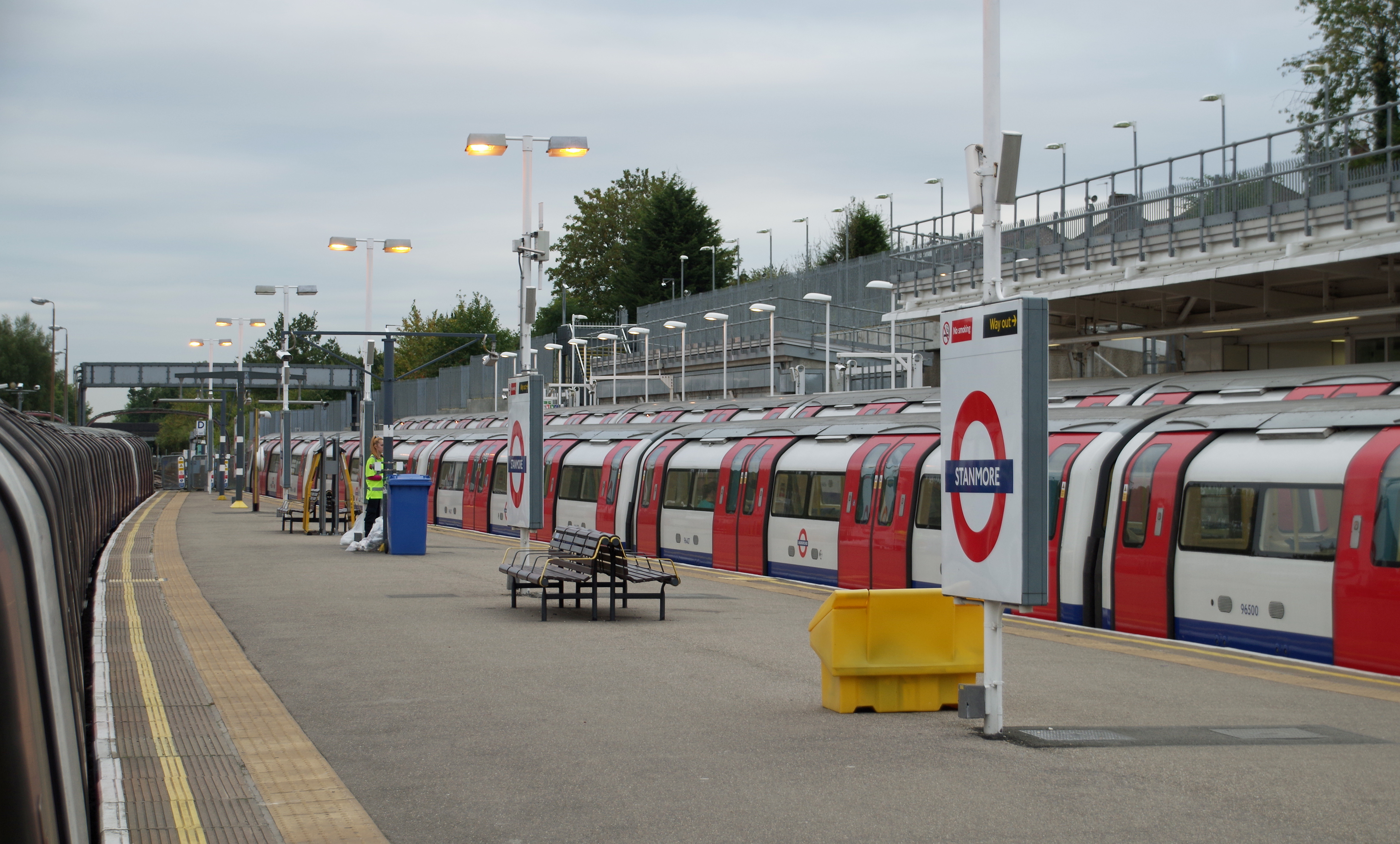
Stanmore tube station, terminus of the Jubilee line

Stanmore is the northern terminus of the Jubilee line, giving the area direct London Underground access to Central London. The Stanmore branch line to Harrow & Wealdstone station closed in 1964.

=== Bus routes ===
Route	Start	End	Operator
142	Brent Cross	Watford Junction	London Sovereign
324	Elstree	Brent Cross Tesco	Metroline
340	Edgware	Harrow	Arriva London
H12	Stanmore	South Harrow	London Sovereign
79	Edgware	Alperton Sainsbury's	London Sovereign
107	Edgware	New Barnet	Metroline
186	Brent Cross	Northwick Park Hospital	Metroline
H18/H19	Harrow	Harrow	London Sovereign
N98 (Night)	Stanmore	Holborn	Metroline
