= Bentley Priory Nature Reserve =

Nature reserve in the London Borough of Harrow, England

Coordinates: 51.622°N 0.330°W

Bentley Priory
- Site of Special Scientific Interest
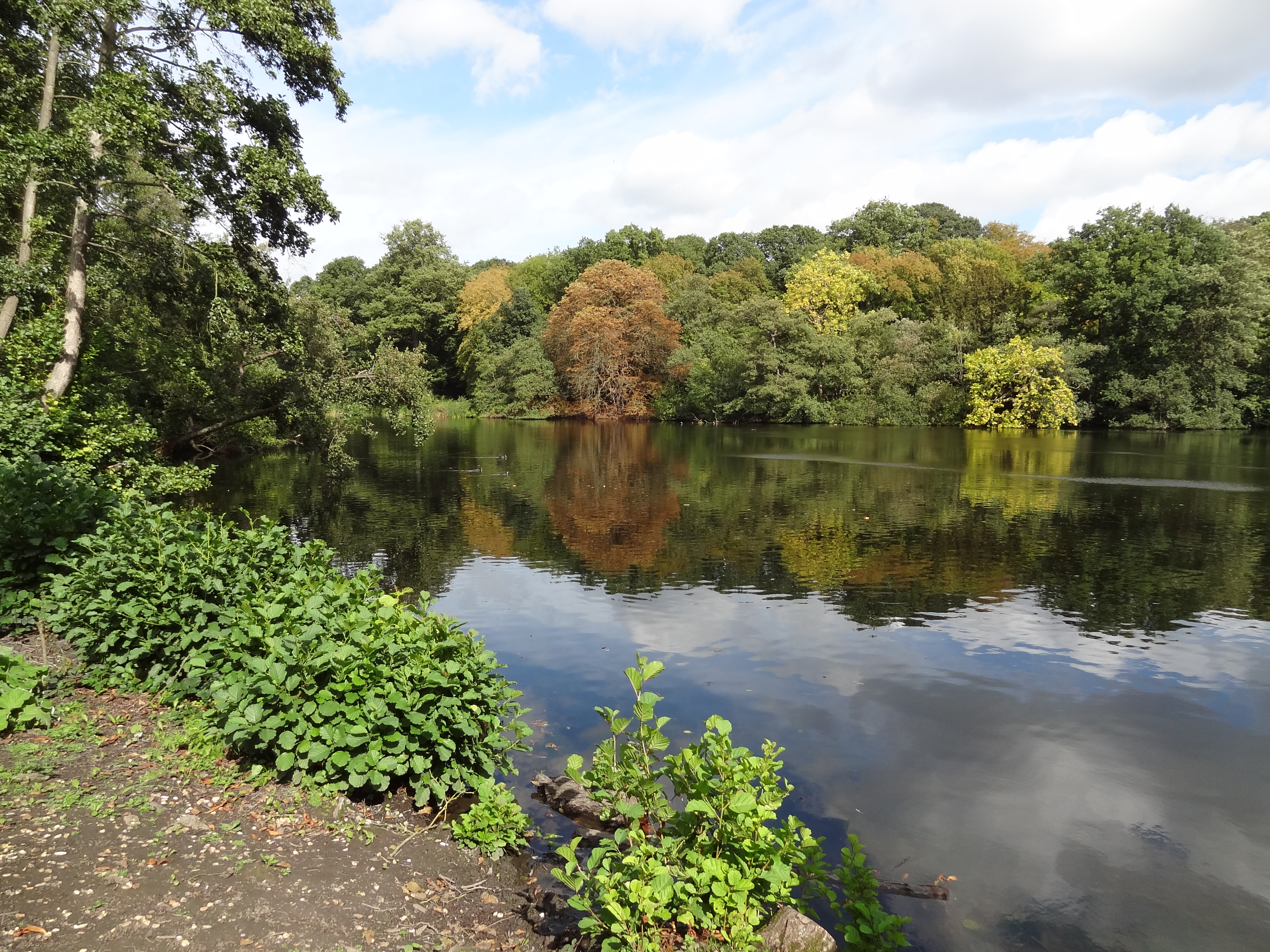
- Summerhouse Lake
- Location of Bentley Priory.
- Area of search: Greater London
- Grid reference: TQ156927
- Interest: Biological
- Area: 55.1 ha (136 acres)
- Notification date: 1990
- Location map: Magic Map

Bentley Priory Nature Reserve is a Site of Special Scientific Interest and Local Nature Reserve in Stanmore in the London Borough of Harrow, surrounding the stately home of Bentley Priory. It is a 55 hectare mosaic of ancient woodland, unimproved neutral grassland, scrub, wetland, streams and an artificial lake, an unusual combination of habitats in Greater London.

== History ==
Bentley Priory was an Augustinian priory of Canons in the Middle Ages, but it ceased to exist before the Dissolution of the Monasteries in the 1530s. In 1775 Sir John Soane designed a new house which stood north of the original priory, also called Bentley Priory. Edgware Brook, a small stream which ran through the grounds, was dammed to form Summerhouse Lake, which was named after the lakeside gazebo of Queen Adelaide, the widow of King William IV, who spent the last years of her life there in the 1840s.

The grounds and house were separated when the house became RAF Bentley Priory, the headquarters of Fighter Command during the Second World War. The grounds are now maintained as a nature reserve by the Harrow Nature Conservation Forum, a sub-committee of the Harrow Heritage Trust. All land within Bentley Priory SSSI is owned by the local authority.

== The Reserve ==
The name Bentley is believed to derive from the Anglo-Saxon word Beonet, a place covered in coarse grass, which remain a feature of much of the site today, which includes traditional grassland which has never been treated with fertilisers, and hence is rich in wild flowers. The dominant grasses are common bent, red fescue and Yorkshire Fog. Uncommon wild flowers include greater burnet, great burnet and spotted orchid. There are many birds including buzzard, spotted flycatcher, and bullfinch

Bentley Priory has a number of woods, including Heriot Wood. Its dominant tree is hornbeam, a species characteristic of ancient woodlands, and it probably dates back to the end of the last Ice Age, the Younger Dryas, 11,500 years ago. To the east is a private deer park.

The London Loop goes through Bentley Priory, There is access from Common Road, Priory Drive, Aylmer Drive, Embry Way, Old Lodge Way, Bentley Way and Masefield Avenue.

== See also ==
- List of Sites of Special Scientific Interest in Greater London
- List of Local Nature Reserves in Greater London
