= Stanmore Country Park, London =

Public park in Greater London, England

Coordinates: 51.6218°N 0.30698°W

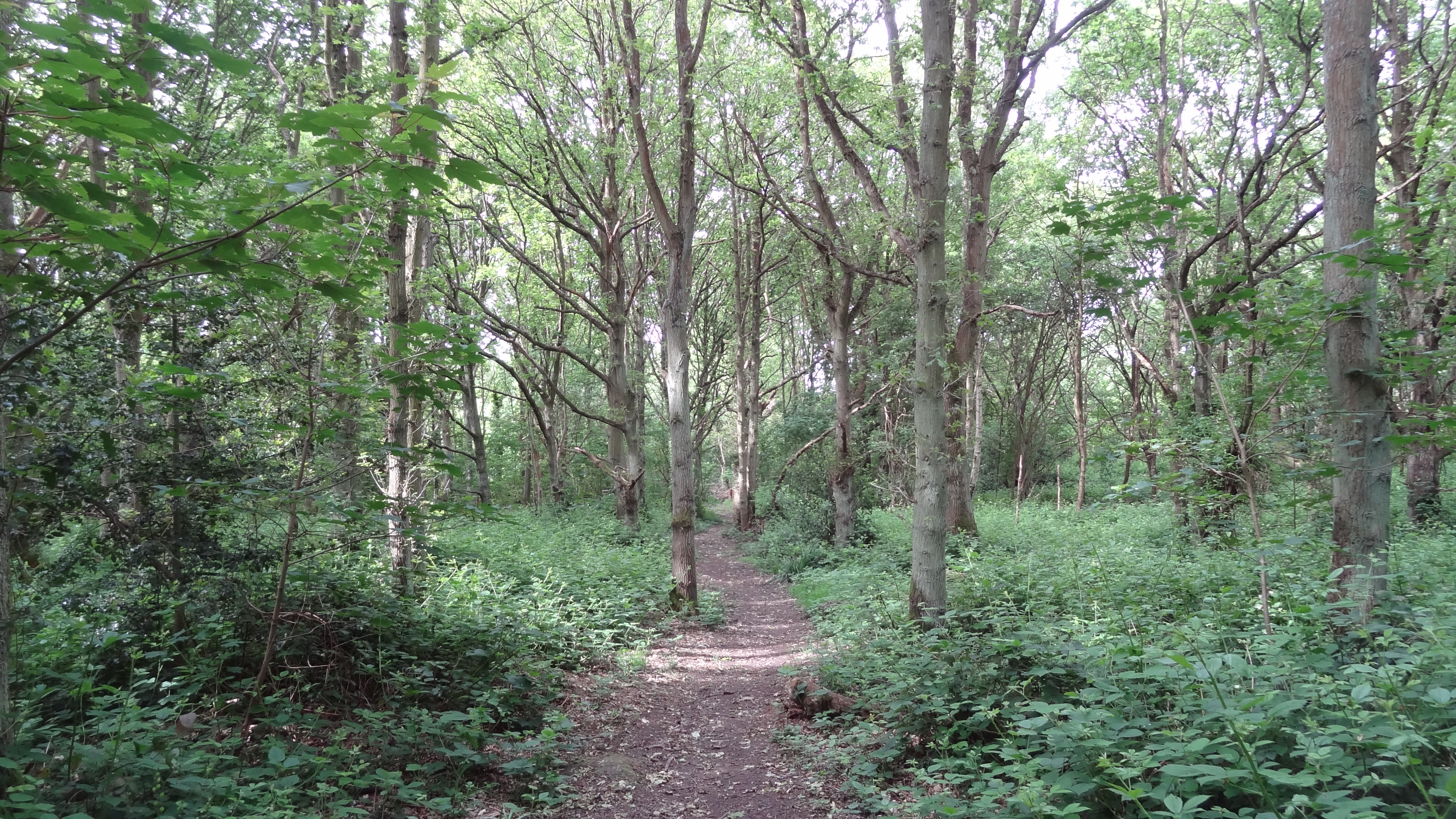

Stanmore Country Park is a 30.7-hectare (76-acre) public park, Local Nature Reserve and Site of Metropolitan Importance for Nature Conservation in Stanmore in the London Borough of Harrow. It is owned and managed by Harrow London Borough Council.

The park was part of the grounds of an eighteenth-century mansion called Warren House. In 1937 it was acquired by Middlesex County Council and Harrow Urban District Council as public open space. It was later owned by the Greater London Council and transferred to the London Borough of Harrow in 1976. The presence of wild service trees and mature hornbeam shows that part of it is ancient woodland. The main plants in grassland areas are common bent and Yorkshire fog, with tufted hair grass in damp areas.

The park has a diverse array of mammals including Reeves's muntjac and red fox; there have also been unconfirmed sightings of European badger, weasel and even wild boar. Bird life is also abundant within the park which contains several members of the tit family, blackbirds, magpies and crows. The park is also home to tawny owls, buzzards, sparrowhawks and kestrels. There is access from Kerry Avenue and Dennis Lane.
