= List of schools in the London Borough of Harrow =

This is a list of schools in the London Borough of Harrow, England.

== State-funded schools ==
=== Primary schools ===
- Avanti House Primary School
- Aylward Primary School
- Belmont School
- Camrose Primary School
- Cannon Lane Primary School
- Cedars Manor School
- Earlsmead Primary School
- Elmgrove Primary School
- Glebe Primary School
- Grange Primary School
- Grimsdyke School
- Heathland School
- Hujjat Primary School
- Kenmore Park Infant School
- Kenmore Park Junior School
- Krishna Avanti Primary School
- Longfield Primary School
- Marlborough Primary School
- Newton Farm Infant and Junior School
- Norbury School
- Pinner Park Primary School
- Pinner Wood School
- Priestmead Primary School and Nursery
- Roxbourne Primary School
- Roxeth Primary School
- St Anselm's RC Primary School
- St Bernadette's RC Primary School
- St George's Primary RC Academy
- St Jerome CE Bilingual School
- St John Fisher Primary School
- St John's CE School
- St Joseph's Primary School
- St Teresa's Primary School
- Stag Lane Primary School
- Stanburn Primary School
- Vaughan Primary School
- Weald Rise Primary School
- The Welldon Park Academy
- West Lodge Primary School
- Whitchurch Primary School
- Whitefriars School

=== Secondary schools ===
- Avanti House Secondary School
- Bentley Wood High School
- Canons High School
- Harrow High School
- Hatch End High School
- Nower Hill High School
- Park High School
- Pinner High School
- Rooks Heath School
- Sacred Heart Language College
- St Gregory's RC Science College*
- Salvatorian College
- Whitefriars School
- Whitmore High School

* This school is located in Harrow but also accepts pupils from Brent

=== Special and alternative schools ===
- Alexandra School
- The Helix Education Centre
- The Jubilee Academy
- Kingsley High School
- Shaftesbury High School
- Woodlands School

=== Further education ===
- Harrow College
- St Dominic's Sixth Form College
- Stanmore College

== Independent schools ==
=== Primary and preparatory schools ===
- Alpha Preparatory School
- Buckingham Preparatory School
- Harmony Primary School
- Orley Farm School
- Reddiford School

=== Senior and all-through schools ===
- Harrow Independent College
- Harrow School
- The John Lyon School
- North London Collegiate School

=== Special and alternative schools ===
- Pathways School
- The Red Balloon Learner Centre

=== Further education ===
- Regent Independent College
