= Rogers Family Stadium =

Football stadium in Harrow, England

Coordinates: 51°33′30″N 0°22′20″W

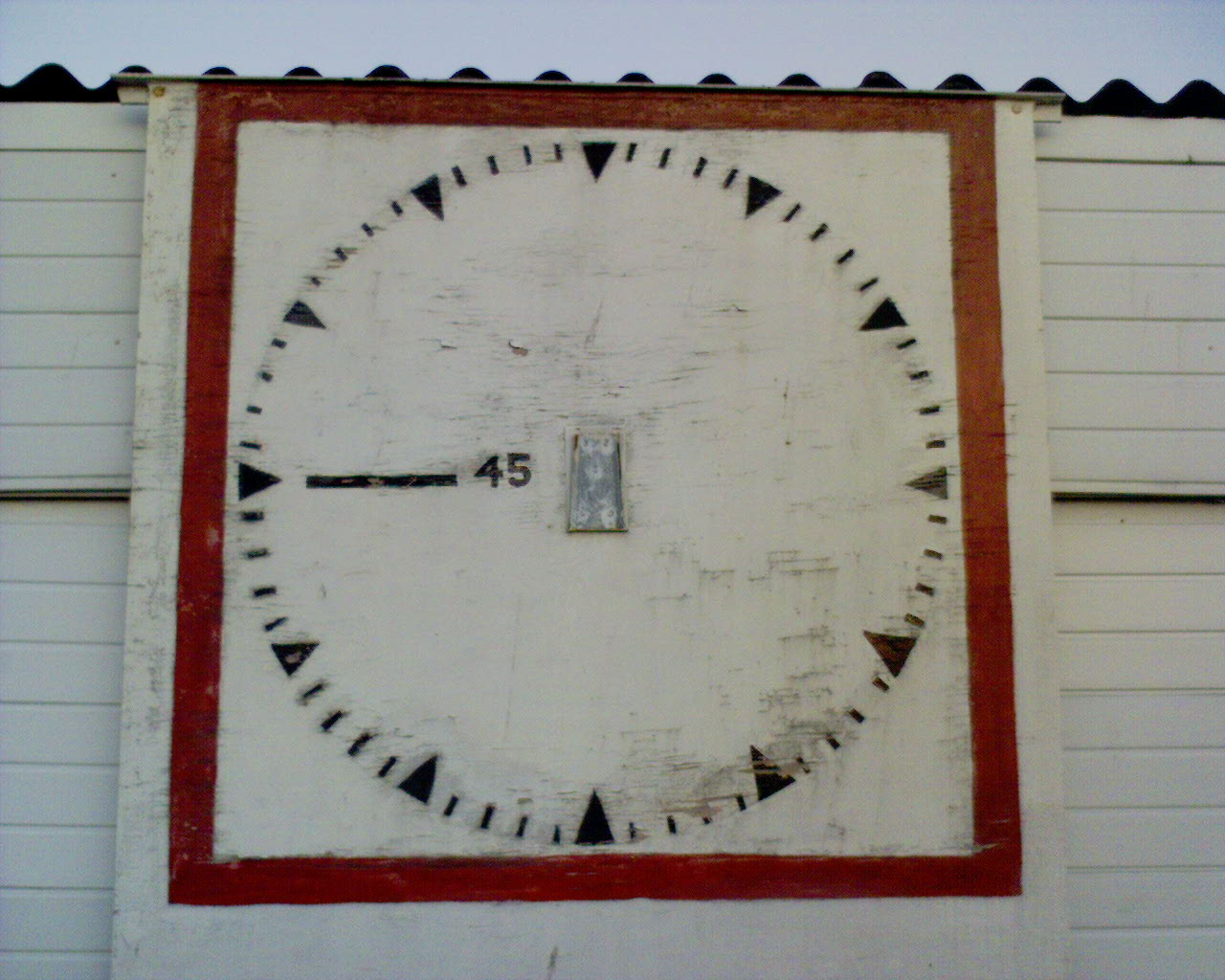
- Interactive map of Rogers Family Stadium
- Full name: Rogers Family Stadium
- Former names: Earlsmead Stadium
- Location: London Borough of Harrow
- Owner: Harrow Borough F.C.
- Capacity: 3,070
- Field size: 111 × 71 yards

Construction
- Built: 1934
- Opened: 1934

Tenant
- Harrow Borough F.C.

Rogers Family Stadium (previously Earlsmead Stadium) is a football stadium in Harrow, north-west London, England. It is the home ground of Harrow Borough F.C. until June 2027 after it was announced in September 2026 it has been sold to housing developers. The stadium has a capacity of 3,070 people, which includes 350 seats and standing under cover for 1,000 people. The record attendance is 3,000 for an FA Cup match against local rivals Wealdstone FC in 1946.

== History ==
Harrow Borough F.C. took residency in 1934, a year after forming. They played their first season at a ground on nearby Northolt Road.

A local pavilion was dismantled and rebuilt on the Earlmead site in 1938. Having been presented to the club by a local land owner Mr G Champniss, later club president, it was to call the Champniss Stand. This stand had room for 250 seated and a further 100 standing. During the Second World War the Pavilion was successfully blacked out and the club could continue playing. Hurricane lamps under biscuit tins with words such as 'way in' and 'turn left' punched out provided signage.

In 1947-48 extra covering was built out of Ex-Anderson shelter sheeting and ex-government 6" steel tubes. The remains of this covered terracing is still used on the South-east corner of the ground.

Earlsmead initially consisted of two pitches but the second pitch was sold to the local council in the early 1970s, who then built Earlsmead Primary School on it. With the money raised from the sale, Harrow Borough F.C. built a new clubhouse and installed new floodlights and new concrete terracing. Whilst this major redevelopment took place, the team played the entire 1973–74 season on opponents' or neutral grounds.

In 1995, The Champniss Stand was demolished after 57 years to be replaced with a modern stand to comply with new safety regulations. This new stand, with a seated capacity of 350, was funded through private donations, club fundraising and the Football Foundation.

In 2017, the stadium was renamed ‘Rogers Family Stadium’ to commemorate the 50 years chairman Peter Rogers spent at the club.

== Location ==
The Rogers Family Stadium is on the site of common land on the furthest west side of Roxeth in what was once known as Dabbs Field. In this area, around 850 AD, it is believed there was a now forgotten battle as commemorated in place names such as the Bonefield and the Hundred of Gore.

The surrounding area was built as part of the Metro-land developments in the early 1930s. A local housing development, the Earlsmead Housing Estate, appears to have given the ground its former name.

The streets around the ground are largely named after castles in the British Isles; Windsor, Warwick, Kenilworth, Walton, Arundel, Corfe, Balmoral, Ludlow, Tregenna. The only exceptions being Holyrood Avenue, which appears to be named after the Palace, Ivy, Carlyon Avenue, Somervell Road, Eastcote Lane and Earlsmead itself.

== Access ==
The Rogers Family Stadium is within 30 minutes walking distance of three London Underground stations on three separate lines. South Harrow(Pic), Northolt (Central) and Rayners Lane (Met/Pic). Northolt Park (Chiltern Line) British Rail is the closest rail stop at only a 15 minutes walk away. Bus routes 140, 114, 282, 395, 399 and the circular H9 / H10 through South Harrow / Rayners Lane all pass nearby, stopping around ten minutes walk of the ground.

== See also ==
- Harrow Borough F.C.
