= Rajesh Maru =

Kenyan-born English cricket coach and former cricketer

Personal information
- Full name: Rajesh Jamandass Maru
- Born: 28 October 1962 (age 64); Nairobi, Kenya Colony
- Batting: Right-handed
- Bowling: Slow left-arm orthodox

Domestic team information
- Years: Team
- 1980–1983: Middlesex
- 1984–1998: Hampshire
- 1999–2001: Hampshire Cricket Board

Career statistics
Competition	First-class	List A
Matches	229	109
Runs scored	2,965	287
Batting average	17.04	13.04
100s/50s	–/7	–/–
Top score	74	33*
Balls bowled	40,038	4,552
Wickets	527	88
Bowling average	33.61	39.87
5 wickets in innings	15	–
10 wickets in match	1	–
Best bowling	8/41	4/29
Catches/stumpings	254/–	48/–
- Source: ESPNcricinfo, 8 December 2009

Rajesh Jamandass Maru (born 28 October 1962) is a Kenyan-born English cricket coach and former cricketer. Maru moved to England with his parents as a child, where he began playing cricket at school level. He represented Middlesex in age-level cricket from the age of nine, and signed his first professional contract with the county in 1979. A slow left-arm orthodox spin bowler, he played first-class and one-day cricket for Middlesex until 1983, but struggled to establish himself in the Middlesex side due to the presence of spinners Phil Edmonds and John Emburey.

Maru was subsequently released by Middlesex in 1984, and signed for Hampshire shortly after, playing for them until his retirement in 1998. He made 213 first-class and 102 one-day appearances for the county, taking 504 and 82 wickets respectively. He continued to play for the Hampshire Cricket Board in the minor counties one-day competition and domestic one-day competition. After retiring, he was a development coach at Hampshire, and later director of coaching at Lancing College.

== Early life and education ==
Rajesh Jamandass Maru was born in Nairobi in October 1962. He moved with his family to England in 1972, after his father had been headhunted by Mercedes-Benz. They settled in London, when Maru was 8 years age. He first attended Oakington Manor Primary School. He was encouraged by his teacher to take up cricket, where he was spotted at school trials by former Test cricketer Jack Robertson. Aged 9, he began playing for Middlesex at under-10 level. From Oakington, he undertook his secondary education at Rooks Heath School in South Harrow, where he captained the cricket team.

== Cricket ==
=== Middlesex ===
Maru signed a contract for Middlesex in 1979, and began playing for their Second XI in the same year, topping their bowling averages. He played for England Under-19 in 1980 and 1981, at Youth Test and One Day International level. Maru made his debut in first-class cricket for Middlesex against Essex in the 1980 County Championship at Southend-on-Sea, making eight appearances in the competition, and taking 12 wickets at an average of 34.33. He also made his debut in List A one-day cricket, playing once in the John Player League against Kent at Lord's. During the winter he toured Zimbabwe with Middlesex, making three first-class appearances and a single one-day appearance against the Zimbabwean national team. He did not play for the Middlesex first team in 1981, instead playing club cricket for Wembley. He made four first-class appearances in the 1982 season, playing twice in the County Championship, in addition to appearing against Cambridge University and the touring Pakistanis; he took 7 wickets at an average of 12.57 in these matches. Facing competition in the Middlesex team from the left and right-arm spin combination of Phil Edmonds and John Emburey, Maru struggled to secure a regular place. He did not play for the first team in the 1983 season, and was released at the end of the season.

=== Hampshire ===
==== First-class regular ====
After being linked with a move to Nottinghamshire, Maru was signed by Hampshire in September 1983, replacing spinner John Southern, who had retired. He established himself in Hampshire's first team in the 1984 season, making 17 first-class appearances – 15 in the County Championship. He had success bowling, taking 47 wickets at an average of 35.40; he took his first career five wicket haul (6 for 65) against Leicestershire in June, and his second (7 for 79) in August against Middlesex. In one-day cricket, he made two appearances in the John Player Special League. He made 23 first-class appearances in 1985, with Hampshire finishing second in the County Championship. He took 73 wickets at an average of 26.34 and claiming five wickets in an innings on three occasions; he was their third-highest wicket-taker in the Championship with 64, behind Tim Tremlett (75) and Malcolm Marshall (95). He scored his first half-century against Sussex, when batting as a nightwatchman he made 62 and shared in a partnership of 120 runs for the second wicket with Chris Smith. In one-day cricket, he featured once in the 1985 John Player Special League against Kent. Following the season, he signed a two-year contract extension.

Maru took 48 wickets at an average of 27.83 from 17 first-class appearances in the 1986 season. He missed three weeks in June–July, after breaking his middle finger on his left hand. He was awarded his county cap in August. He made 26 first-class appaearances in 1987, taking 71 wickets at an average of 29.02 and five wickets in an innings on three occasions; with 66 wickets, he was their joint-second highest wicket-taker in the County Championship with Tremlett, six behind Marshall's 72. Maru featured six times in Hampshire's one-day team in 1987. In 1988, he made 23 first-class appearances, taking 50 wickets at an average of 35.84. He scored a second half-century (74 runs), and passed 300 runs for the season; his half-century was again made as a nightwatchman, with him sharing in a partnership of 153 runs for the fourth wicket with Robin Smith. Whilst fielding against Northamptonshire, he equalled Tom Dean's record of seven catches by a Hampshire fielder (excluding wicket-keepers) in a match; it has since been equalled by Liam Dawson. He played once in one-day cricket in 1988, against Leicestershire in the Refuge Assurance League.

Maru took career-best bowling figures in the 1989 County Championship against Kent in May, taking 8 for 41 to help Hampshire to victory by 144 runs. Across the match, he took 12 for 105, the only time in his career he would take ten wickets in a match; his 8 for 41 were the best innings figures by a bowler in 1989. Throughout the season, he made 23 first-class appearances, taking 44 wickets at an average of 33.89. He made seven appearances in one-day cricket, but took only 3 wickets. In 1990, Maru made 25 first-class appearances. He took 66 wickets at an average of 36.66, taking 6 for 97 against Gloucestershire in September. He had his best season batting in 1990, scoring 520 runs at an average of 28.88, making three half-centuries. In May against Yorkshire, he shared in a partnership of 99 runs for the sixth wicket with Marshall, made over the course of 26 overs. He featured regularly in Hampshire's one-day side in 1990, making 25 appearances. He took 23 wickets in these, at an average of 35.82 and with best figures of 3 for 38. In 1991, Maru took 40 wickets at an average of 41.02, from 22 first-class matches, taking five wickets in an innings once. He scored 392 runs at an average of 17.04, making one half-century. Maru played for Hampshire in the final of the NatWest Trophy against Surrey, which they won by 4 wickets. He made 11 one-day appearances across the season, but took just 6 wickets at a high average of 48.66.

==== Later seasons ====
Following the 1991 season, Maru played less regularly in the County Championship, being used more as a one-day bowler. At the beginning of the 1992 season, he formed a spin-bowling partnership with Shaun Udal, but fell out of favour as the season progressed, with Maru making eight first-class appearances. He still took 17 wickets at an average of 26.11, taking 4 for 8 against Sussex in a rain-affected Hampshire victory at Arundel. In 14 one-day appearances, he took 10 wickets at an average of 51.50, but did not play for Hampshire in their victory against Kent in the final of the Benson & Hedges Cup, with Jon Ayling being preferred. He played just once for Hampshire in 1993, a first-class match against the touring Australians at Southampton. In 1994, he made nine appearances in the County Championship, deputising for Udal later in the season when he was on international duty. He took 15 wickets in the Championship, at an average of 41.40. In one-day cricket, he made four appearances in the Axa Equity & Law League.

In the 1995 season, Maru made two appearances in the County Championship, alongside ten one-day appearances; in one-day cricket, he took 9 wickets at an average of 43.88. He featured more regularly for Hampshire in the 1996 County Championship, making 11 appearances. He took 18 wickets at an average of 40.77, and scored 303 runs at an average of 25.25, scoring the final half-century of his career with an unbeaten 55 runs against Glamorgan. In eight one-day appearances, he took 4 wickets at an average of 66.50. He played in 12 one-day matches in 1997, taking 10 wickets at an average of exactly 40, and made four appearances in the County Championship. By conclusion of the 1997 season, Maru had moved into an assistant-coaching role at Hampshire. He was afforded a benefit for the 1998 season, playing two final matches during the season, both first-class matches against Lancashire in the County Championship and the touring Sri Lankans. He retired from professional cricket at the end of the season.

=== Hampshire Cricket Board ===
Maru was appointed captain of the Hampshire Cricket Board (HCB) (Note: The Hampshire Cricket Board (HCB), formed in 1996, is the governing body for recreational cricket in the county of Hampshire. It entered a largely amateur team in the minor counties one-day Knockout Trophy between 1998 and 2002, and took part alongside the first-class and minor counties, and other cricket boards, in the List A domestic one-day competition between 1999 and 2003. The HCB is a separate entity to Hampshire County Cricket Club, which was formed in 1863, and is the professional representative team for the county of Hampshire.) in 1999. He played for the HCB four times in the 1999 MCCA Knockout Trophy, and captained the side in its maiden List A appearance in the NatWest Trophy against minor county Suffolk. Having defeated Suffolk in the first round, the HCB defeated another minor county, Shropshire, in the second round, before losing to Glamorgan in the third round. In 2000, he made two appearances in the MCCA Knockout Trophy, and played in the HCB's first round defeat against Huntingdonshire in the NatWest Trophy. In 2001, he made four further MCCA Knockout Trophy appearances, before playing in the HCB's defeat to the Kent Cricket Board in the Cheltenham & Gloucester Trophy. During this period, he played club cricket in the Southern Cricket League for Portsmouth, being appointed club captain in 2000. He was their leading wicket-taker in 2001, with 34, and guided them to promotion to the first division. He played for Portsmouth until 2002.

== Playing style and statistics ==
Maru was a slow left-arm orthodox bowler, who gave the ball time in the air, despite having a low bowling trajectory. Mark Nicholas, his captain at Hampshire, described his deliveries as "gentle". A right-handed lower order batsman, Maru was often employed as a nightwatchman, sent in to bat when a top-order batsman was dismissed at the end of the day, in order protect the wicket of the proceeding batsman. He was capable of playing a defensive innings by blocking, doing so when supporting a batting partner who was set and accumulating runs. He was a good close-to-the wicket fielder. Maru made 229 first-class appearances during his career, 213 of which came for Hampshire. He took 504 wickets for the county, at an average of 33.62; he took five or more wickets in an innings on 15 occasions. Batting, he scored 2,818 runs at an average of 17.50, making seven fifties. In one-day cricket, he made 109 appearances, with 102 coming for Hampshire. He took 82 wickets for Hampshire, averaging 40.46. His 240 catches for Hampshire in first-class cricket makes him one of the few players to have averaged better than a catch a game for the county.

== Coaching career ==
Following his retirement from playing, Maru became a development coach at Hampshire; he played an important role in the development of future England internationals Danny Briggs, Liam Dawson, and James Vince. In 2007, he coached Hampshire's under-17 side to the Under-17 County Championship. He established a spin bowling academy in Portsmouth in the mid-2000s and coached part-time at The Portsmouth Grammar School. In 2008, he became director of cricket at Lancing College, where he coached Mason Crane and Alice Capsey. As of 2026, he remains at Lancing College. In the summer of 2013, he coached the cricket club at Wisborough Green in West Sussex. Maru has coached for the England and Wales Cricket Board's "Spin It Up" initiative, that sought to teach coaches bowling from a spinner's perspective.

== Works cited ==
- Nicholas, Mark (2017). A Beautiful Game: My Love Affair with Cricket. London: Allen & Unwin. ISBN 978-1-7602-9271-3 – via Internet Archive.
