= Park High School =

Park High School may refer to:

- Park High School, Colne, in Lancashire, England
- Park High School (Racine, Wisconsin)
- Park High School (Cottage Grove, Minnesota)
- Park High School, Stanmore, in the London Borough of Harrow, London, England
- Park High School (Livingston, Montana), in Livingston, Montana, United States
- Park High School (Birkenhead), one predecessor of Birkenhead Park School, England
- Park Tudor School, Indianapolis, Indiana, formerly Park School

== See also ==
- Allen Park High School
