= Devaanshi Mehta =

British humanitarian (1996–2012)

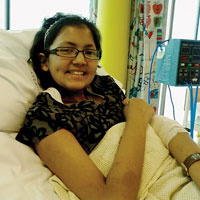
- Devaanshi in hospital in 2009
- Born: Devaanshi Mehta; 18 December 1996; Harrow, London, England
- Died: 28 June 2012 (aged 15); Great Ormond Street Hospital, Bloomsbury, London, England
- Cause of death: chronic oblierative lung disease/pulmonary fibrosis
- Education: Cannon Lane Primary School; Nower Hill High School
- Known for: Humanatarian work, Asian Donor Campaign (ADC)/Raising awareness for the need for more ethnic donors and fundraising for GOSH’s Bone marrow transplant unit.

Devaanshi Mehta (18 December 1996 – 28 June 2012) was a British - Indian student and humanitarian. She started the Asian Donor Campaign (ADC), a UK-based non-profit organisation whose goal is to raise awareness for the need to get more Asians to donate their blood, bone marrow and organs. ADC also raises funds for Great Ormond Street hospital doing ground breaking research into critical and life limiting Diseases such as Dyskeratosis Congenita.

== Biography ==
Devaanshi was born to Harkant and Kalyani Mehta in the Harrow suburb of London. She was one of four children born into a Hindu, Gujarati family. She had two older sisters, Jyotika and Tejal, and a younger brother, Dushyant. She attended Cannon Lane Primary School, before attending Nower Hill High School.

At the age of nine, Devaanshi was diagnosed with a rare bone marrow condition aplastic anaemia (bone marrow failure). She underwent a bone marrow transplant in April 2007 and a top up of bone marrow in February 2008 at Great Ormond Street Hospital in London. Her doctors were Paul Veys, Persis Amrolia and Paul Arora among others. Both donations were made by her younger brother Dushyant who was her sibling match. However, she was left chronically platelet and red cell dependent after the transplant. In addition, she inherited her brothers' rarer blood type AB−. Therefore it became increasingly difficult to source negative platelets for her, and she organised appeals via the media. This motivated Devaanshi to investigate problems other children faced sourcing blood, bone marrow and organs. She learnt that it was extremely difficult for people to find these products at the right time, because there were a lack of donors within the Asian community as a whole. These events inspired her to start fundraising and raising awareness regarding the importance of blood, bone marrow and organ donation, especially for the Asian communities. Asians have traditionally avoided donating blood and organs due to social or religious misconceptions.

In 2010, Devaanshi's lungs collapsed and she had comprehensive lung surgery at Great Ormond Street Hospital for children in Bloomsbury, London. Consequently she was put on palliative care. While her health was deteriorating, she organised charity fundraising events from her hospital bed. She also gave a number of interviews on television, radio and in print to raise awareness. Devaanshi also wrote a blog titled "My Story in My own Words", where she spoke candidly about her treatment and prognosis.

== Death and influence ==
Devaanshi died on 28 June 2012 at the Great Ormond Street Hospital after a lengthy battle with her lung condition and chronic platelet transfusion dependency. She wrote: "Nothing more can be done for me now, but I want to make a difference to other children."

On 29 September 2013, nine staff members from Nower Hill High School, which Devaanshi had attended, cycled 36 miles from the school to Windsor Castle in Berkshire to raise money for the Great Ormond Street Hospital bone marrow transplant unit where she died. The staff at Nowerhill continue to do the annual bike ride in memory of Devaanshi every year since her death. There is also a plaque placed in her school in her memory.https://www.nowerhill.org.uk/

== Awards ==
Devaanshi won the Jack Petchey Award for her fundraising and awareness campaigns in 2010, and was nominated for the Justgiving Young Fundraiser of the Year in 2011. Devaanshi was also recognised by the Well Child Foundation for the most inspirational child in the 12-15-year category in 2012.
