= Bentley Wood High School =

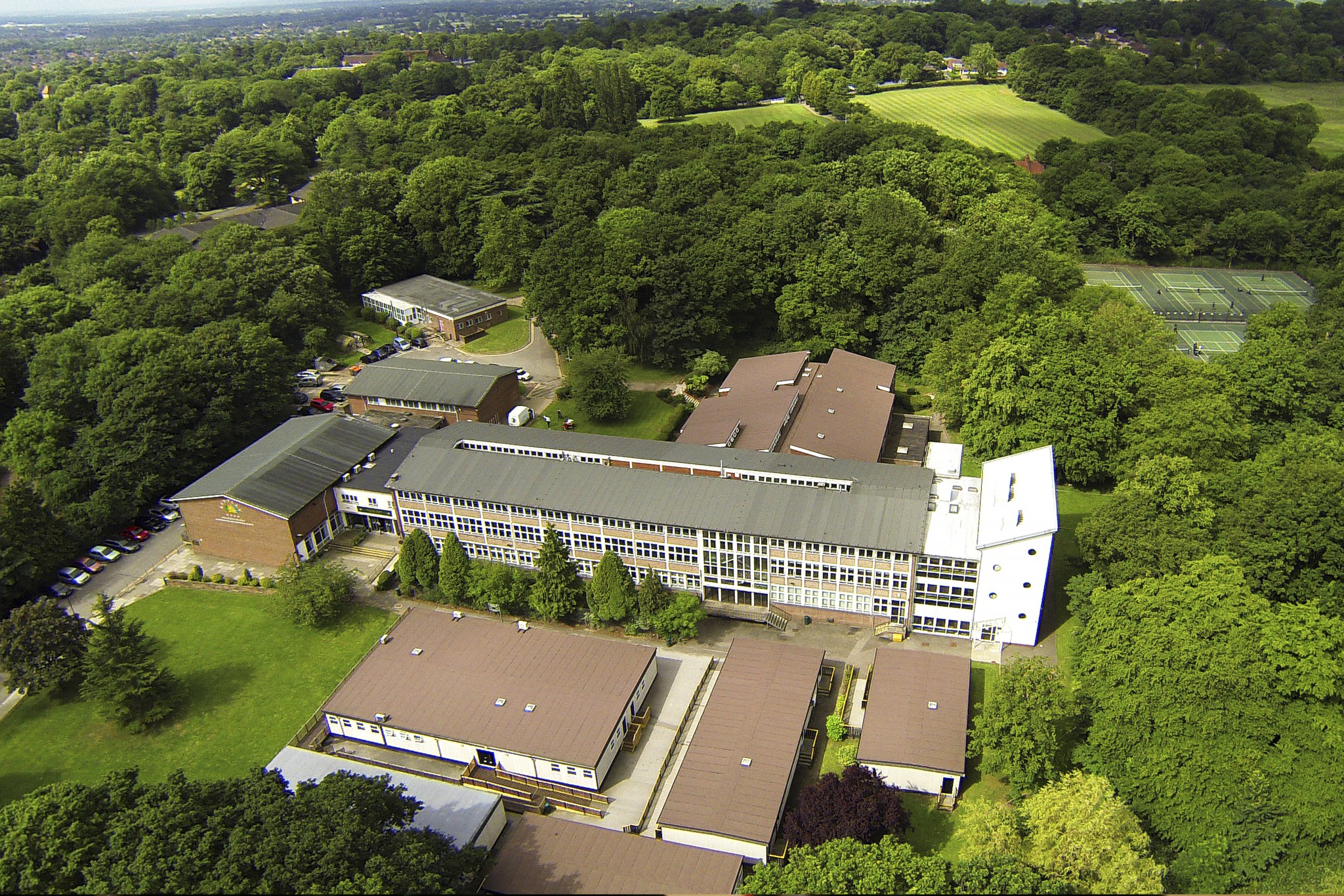
- Aerial view of Bentley Wood

Location
- Clamp Hill; Stanmore, Harrow, HA7 3JW; England; 51°37′05″N 0°19′56″W

Information
- Type: Academy
- Department for Education URN: 137178 Tables
- Ofsted: Reports
- Head teacher: Naseema Akbar
- Gender: Girls
- Age: 11 to 18
- Enrolment: 1021
- Houses: 4
- Website: www.bentleywood.harrow.sch.uk

Bentley Wood High School is an all-girls secondary academy school in Stanmore, Harrow, England.

== History ==
BWHS was originally called Heriots Wood Grammar School.

== About the school ==
Bentley Wood High School is a multi-cultural girls' comprehensive school which receives students from a wide range of primary schools. The majority of students transfer from Harrow primary schools but students are also admitted from out of borough.

Bentley Wood High School specialises in maths, science and computing. It has been recognised for its 2015 performance by the Schools, Students and Teachers network (SSAT). The school was declared outstanding by Ofsted, and has been in the top 1% of schools nationally for three years. It was recognised as the seventh highest-performing school in the country in 2015 for student progress.

The sixth form centre is part of the Harrow Sixth Form Collegiate.

== Admissions ==
The academy complies with the requirements of the Funding Agreement and the School Admissions Code, and recognises that its 'relevant area' is the London Borough of Harrow.

== Notable former pupils ==
- Camilla Beeput, actress
- Shami Chakrabarti, politician, barrister, and human rights activist
- Ruby McGregor-Smith, business executive and politician
- Abi Oyepitan, 100m sprinter
- Carla Marie Williams, songwriter

== Location ==
It is just north of the A410, in the parish of All Saints, Harrow Weald, just south of Bentley Wood Nature Reserve. It can be reached via Masefield Avenue.

== See also ==
- List of schools in Harrow
