= Whitefriars =

White friars are members of the Order of Carmelites.

Whitefriars may also refer to:

== Related to Carmelites ==
- Whitefriars, Bristol, a former Carmelite friary in Bristol, England
- Whitefriars, Coventry, a former Carmelite friary in Coventry, England
- Whitefriars, London, an area in London named after the former Carmelite friary there
- Whitefriars, Gloucester, a former Carmelite friary in Gloucester, England
- Whitefriars, where the National Shrine of Saint Jude is based, in Faversham, Kent
- Whitefriars College, a Roman Catholic college in Victoria, Australia
- Ipswich Whitefriars, a former Carmelite friary in Ipswich, England
- Whitefriar Street Carmelite Church, a Roman Catholic church in Dublin, Ireland

== Other ==
- Whitefriars Glass, a trade name of glass manufacturers James Powell and Sons of London, who had premises on the site of a Carmelite friary
- Whitefriars Theatre, a Jacobean London theatre
- Whitefriars Housing Group, a housing association in Coventry
- Whitefriars School, a school in London, England
- Whitefriars Shopping Centre, a shopping centre in Canterbury, England
- Whitefriars, 333 High Street, Lincoln, a listed building in Lincoln, England
- Whitefriars, or, The Days of Charles the Second: an Historical Romance, an 1844 novel published anonymously by Emma Robinson (author)
