= Tom Dean (Hampshire cricketer) =

English cricketer

Personal information
- Full name: Thomas Arthur Dean
- Born: 21 November 1920; Gosport, Hampshire, England
- Died: 4 June 2004 (aged 83); Alexandria, Eastern Cape, South Africa
- Nickname: Dixie; Split Pin
- Batting: Right-handed
- Bowling: Leg break googly

Domestic team information
- Years: Team
- 1939–1949: Hampshire
- 1954: Devon
- 1956: Eastern Province

Career statistics
Competition	First-class
Matches	29
Runs scored	285
Batting average	8.63
100s/50s	–/–
Top score	26
Balls bowled	3,107
Wickets	54
Bowling average	31.59
5 wickets in innings	4
10 wickets in match	1
Best bowling	7/51
Catches/stumpings	31/–
- Source: Cricinfo, 30 January 2010

Thomas Arthur Dean (21 November 1920 – 4 June 2004) was an English first-class cricketer.

Dean was born at Gosport in November 1920 and grew up in South Africa, where he played for the Wanderers Cricket Club in Johannesburg. He returned to England in 1938, at the age of 18, aboard the RMS Balmoral Castle and shortly after his arrival he secured a trial with Hampshire County Cricket Club. Dean made his debut in first-class cricket for Hampshire against Somerset at Bournemouth in the 1939 County Championship, one of three matches he played in that seasons Bournemouth Cricket Week. He met with success in these matches, taking a hat-trick against Worcestershire in his second match, and against reigning County Champions Yorkshire, with his leg break googly bowling he took his maiden five wicket haul with figures of 5 for 58 in Yorkshire's second innings; despite Dean's performances, Hampshire lost all three matches he featured in at Bournemouth. His first three matches bought him 10 wickets at an average of 22.20.

With the Second World War bringing first-class cricket in England to an end, Dean would have to wait six years before he next played at first-class level. It was noted that following the war, Dean was less able to turn to the ball and as a result, his effectiveness suffered. He made thirteen appearances in 1946, taking 21 wickets at an average of 28.28. Against Derbyshire, he took ten wickets in a match for the first time, when he took figures of 7 for 51 and 3 for 78, for match figures of 10 for 129. The following season against Essex, he took what was then a record seven catches by a Hampshire fielder (excluding wicket-keepers) in the match; this record has since been equalled by Rajesh Maru and Liam Dawson. According to Hampshire captain Desmond Eagar, four of his seven catches were "brilliant". He continued to play first-class cricket for Hampshire until 1949, but saw his returns with the ball decrease, though he did take one final five wicket haul against the Combined Services during his final season. In total, Dean made 28 first-class appearances for Hampshire, taking 51 wickets at an average of 31.11, with best figures of 7 for 51.

Dean left Hampshire at the end of the 1949 season and moved to Torquay, where he ran the White Hart Inn public house. In Devon, he played club cricket for South Devon Cricket Club. He also played minor counties cricket for Devon in 1954, making four appearances in the Minor Counties Championship. Dean left Devon at the end of the 1954 season and returned to South Africa in 1955, where he represented Eastern Province in a single first-class match against Border at Port Elizabeth in 1956. In South Africa, he spent 23 years as a cricket coach at Grey High School in Port Elizabeth, where amongst those he coached as a pupil was Graeme Pollock. He was also the director of coaching for Eastern Province for six years. Dean died in June 2004 at Alexandria, Eastern Cape.
