= Harrow Civic Centre =

Municipal building in London, England

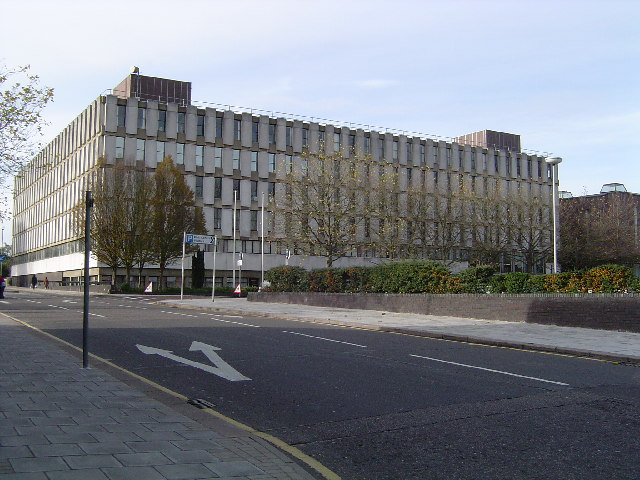
- Harrow Civic Centre

- Shown in Harrow
- 51.5892°N 0.3343°W
- Location: Station Road, Harrow HA1 2XY

History
- Built: 1973; 53 years ago

Site notes
- Architect: Eric G. Broughton

Harrow Civic Centre was a municipal building in Station Road, Harrow, London. It was completed in 1973 as the headquarters of Harrow London Borough Council, and closed in 2023 pending demolition.

== History ==
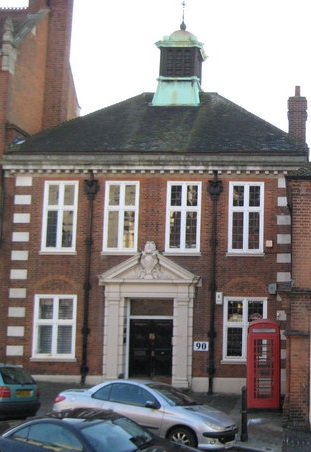
The old council house at 90 High Street

The local board of health for Harrow on the Hill was initially based at 49 High Street and then, from 1888, at 90 High Street. Following a significant increase in population, largely associated with the growing importance of the area as a residential suburb of London, the area became an urban district in 1894. After the district was enlarged by the inclusion of the former Wealdstone urban district in 1934, the new council established itself at the old 19th century Wealdstone council offices in Peel Road in Wealdstone (in a now demolished building on the site of 41 Peel Road).

Following an increase in its responsibilities, having become a municipal borough in 1954 and a London borough in 1965, the council sought larger premises and moved to a private residence known as Harrow Weald Lodge. After this arrangement became inadequate for their needs, civic leaders decided to procure a purpose-built civic centre: the site selected in Station Road had previously been occupied by a primary school and a builder's yard.

Construction on the new building, which was undertaken by F.G. Minter, began on 2 July 1970. The new building was designed by Eric G. Broughton and was officially opened by the mayor, Alderman Henry Gange, on 6 May 1973. The design involved a six-storey square concrete-framed structure with 30 bays on each side; the bays contained a window on each floor flanked by concrete slabs; there was a landscaped courtyard in the centre of the building. The council chamber was contained in an entirely separate structure built to the north east of the main building; it was connected to the main building by a bridge structure containing a large glass decorative screen made by Whitefriars Glass.

The "Kodak Mural", a composite creation of nearly 1,000 tiles bearing Harrow-related photographs, which was designed by Pentagram and made by Kenneth Clark Ceramics, was installed on the first floor landing in 1974.

In April 2004, Queen Elizabeth II, accompanied by the Duke of Edinburgh, visited the civic centre as part of the celebrations in respect of the 50th anniversary of the borough's royal charter.

In October 2014, as part of its regeneration strategy, the council announced proposals to move its headquarters to a more modern facility in Wealdstone and to release the civic centre site for residential use. However, in March 2019, it indicated that there would be delays and, in July 2019, the council decided to find a regeneration partner to help to expedite the development. In September 2020, the council indicated that it had identified that partner although the name of the partner was not revealed.

In the end, the council decided not to build a single replacement building, but instead split its offices between a new building called the Council Hub at an existing council depot site at Forward Drive / Kenmore Avenue in Wealdstone, and an office building on Gayton Road in Harrow. Committee meetings are held at the Council Hub, but full council meetings and the mayor's parlour and civic suite relocated to the Harrow Arts Centre in Pinner. The civic centre closed in February 2023, pending demolition.
