= South Harrow =

South part of the town Harrow, London

Coordinates: 51.564°N 0.35241°W

- Location within Greater London
- OS grid reference: TQ143863
- Ceremonial county: Greater London
- Region: London
- Country: England
- Sovereign state: United Kingdom
- Post town: HARROW
- Postcode district: HA2
- Dialling code: 020
- Police: Metropolitan
- Fire: London
- Ambulance: London
- UK Parliament: Harrow West

South Harrow is the southern part of the town of Harrow, south-west of Harrow on the Hill in the London Borough of Harrow. Its development originally spread south and west from the hamlet of Roxeth in the urbanisation process and easier access from Central London by rail. Six roads now converge at Roxeth hamlet centre at the bottom of Roxeth Hill. Its areas include, in the west, the area of Shaftesbury Circus/Avenue and in the south a shopping area, South Harrow tube station and the high street, Northolt Road.

== History ==
South Harrow succeeded Roxeth and outlying southern fields of Harrow in which that hamlet stood. This was a rural area until the late 19th century with remaining agricultural fields converted to housing by the mid-20th century. South Harrow was in the parish of Harrow which has its well-conserved historic clustered village centre at Harrow on the Hill.

A three-storey Sainsbury's supermarket building was built in the 1960s; it subsequently closed, and after a refit and redesign of its layout (now including an entrance direct to its car park) is now an Aldi.

== Parks and gardens ==
South Harrow has two recreational grounds:

Alexandra Park was named after Queen Alexandra, who frequently visited the area. There is a children's play area, natural rough area, and fitness zone. Nearby is Northolt Park (Chiltern Main Line).

Roxeth Recreation Ground is a large recreational ground containing Cricket and Football pitches, Ball courts, natural roughland and a children's play area. A bowling green, operated by Roxeth Bowls Club, risked to close in 2007, following rent increases from Harrow Council. This recreation ground was donated to the people of South Harrow in the early 20th century and is known as Roxeth Park. During the Second World War it was made into a market garden; it was then returned to recreational use. It also hosted the Roxeth Show each summer up until 2013, and has been given several Green Flag awards.

Adherents of many religious denominations have places of worship in South Harrow, including: Anglican, Catholic, Free Church, Methodist, Salvation Army and Welsh Congregational. Tamils and Koreans meet in churches on Sunday afternoons.

Shops on Northolt Road (the main shopping street in South Harrow) sell Sri Lankan and Polish groceries. There are five Halal butchers, nine public houses and four chicken shops.

== Education ==
Built in 1938, Roxbourne Junior School and Roxbourne Infant School share a site in Torbay Road. The schools were known as Roxbourne Middle School and Roxbourne First School between 1974 and 2010, when the London Borough of Harrow adopted a comprehensive system of education that transferred children to secondary schools at age 12 (after year 7). In 2010 the borough changed the age ranges catered for, and took the opportunity to replace the additional wing that had been added in 1974 to accommodate year 7. The new classrooms are used by Reception and by year 6, at the same time a Nursery class was added to the Infant school. The Infant school now covers ages 4 to 7 as Nursery, Reception, Year 1 and year 2. The Junior school covers ages 8 to 11, as years 3, 4, 5 and 6. The Roxbourne schools have three classes in each year, each class numbering up to thirty pupils.

Welldon Park Junior School and Welldon Park Infant School are built on separate sites in Wyvenhoe Road. The original school opened in 1910 and was known as Welldon Park Primary School. At the outbreak of war the deputy headmaster was Mr Goodhead. A pupil at that time was Peter Walker, later Lord Walker, and he lived in Eastcote Lane. The school was overcrowded by 1942 as more people moved from central London and as other schools were destroyed by the enemy. Classes had up to 40 children. In the main hall two classes sat back to back simultaneously. The same hall was used for school meals as well as the central ground floor corridor. The school served pupils from age 4 to 11 years and had a reputation for academic rigour under the headship of Mrs. Cooper in the 1950s and '60s. After being separated into Welldon Park First School and Weldon Park Middle School, and then Infant and Primary, both schools amalgamated in circa 2015. In 2019, at the start of the school year, the school became a part of the Pegasus Academy Trust, and is now named Welldon Park Academy.

Whitmore High School was formed in 1974 from Lascelles Secondary Boys' and Girls' Schools, and is now a sixth form specialist science school.

Whitmore was demolished and was completely rebuilt by September 2010, following a £30 million grant.

== Demography ==
South Harrow is mostly covered by the Roxbourne and Roxeth wards. According to 2011 Census data, White British was the largest ethnic group in both wards, 24.8% and 23.1% respectively. Other Asian was second biggest, 22% for both, followed by Indian, 19% and 20% respectively. The most spoken foreign language in both wards was Tamil.

== Transport ==
=== Tube/Trains ===
- South Harrow Station (Piccadilly line)
- Northolt Park Station (Chiltern Main Line)

=== Buses ===
Route	Start	End	Operator
114	Ruislip	Mill Hill Broadway	Metroline
140	Hayes and Harlington Station	Harrow Weald	Metroline
SL9 (previously X140)	Heathrow Airport	Harrow	London Sovereign
N140	Heathrow Airport	Harrow	Metroline
258	South Harrow	Watford Junction	London United
395	Harrow	Greenford	London Sovereign
398	Ruislip	Wood End	London Sovereign
487	South Harrow	Willesden Junction	Metroline
H9/H10 Circular	Northwick Park Hospital H9: clockwise	Northwick Park Hospital H10: anticlockwise	London Sovereign
H12	South Harrow	Stanmore	London Sovereign
640	South Harrow	Harrow Weald	Sullivan Buses

== Football clubs ==
- Harrow Borough F.C. of the Isthmian League Premier Division
- Rayners Lane F.C. of the Hellenic Football League Division 1 East

== Notable people ==
- Dame Janet Baker, opera singer, lives in South Harrow
- Bill Bartlett, guitarist of 1960s psychedelic pop group The Lemon Pipers, was born in South Harrow.
- Kenneth Connor (1918–1993), actor, best known for his appearances in the Carry On films, lived in South Harrow.
- Tom Fletcher, singer and guitarist of pop group McFly, born in South Harrow.
- Carrie Hope Fletcher, musical theatre actress and author, sister to Tom Fletcher, was born in South Harrow.
- Johnny Kidd (1935–1966), British rock and roll performer lived in South Harrow.
- Ludwig Koch, nature sound recordist, at Bird Cottage, 39 Walton Avenue.
- Robin Leach, Brit presenter of US TV hit Lifestyles of the Rich and Famous, was born in South Harrow.
- Screaming Lord Sutch (1940–1999), musician and founder of the Monster Raving Loony Party, lived in South Harrow at the time of his death.
- Ernie Wise (1925–1999), of comedy duo Morecambe and Wise, lived in South Harrow.

== Gas explosion ==
On 7 May 2008 at 9.18pm, two houses were destroyed completely and the third badly damaged by a gas explosion in South Harrow. Three people were treated by paramedics after being rescued by firefighters in the rubble. Two survived, but a man was pronounced dead at the scene. Residents of Stanley Road were evacuated.
