= Namira Salim =

Pakistani space enthusiast and peace advocate

- نمیرا سلیم
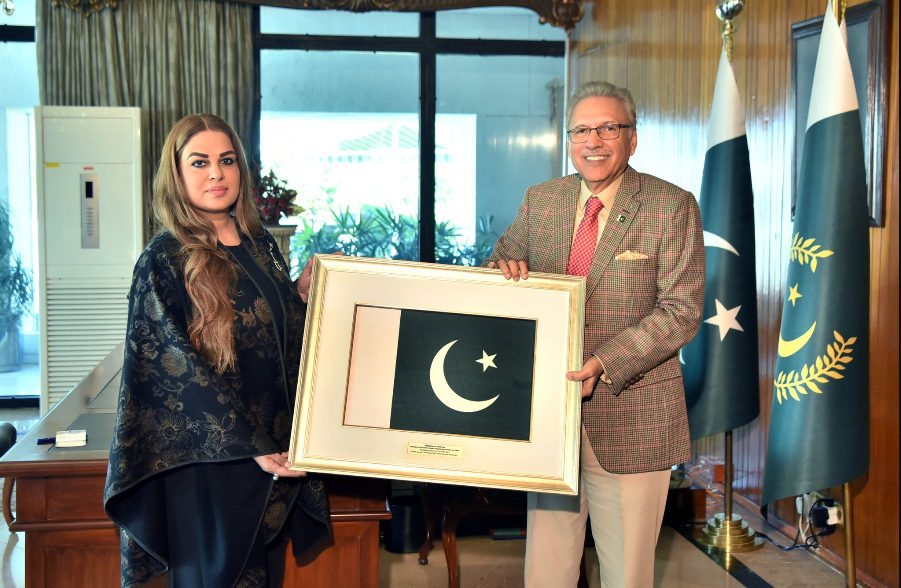
- Namira Salim presents President Arif Alvi, President of Pakistan the National Flag she flew to space
- Born: Namira Salim; Karachi, Pakistan
- Education: Columbia University; Hofstra University
- Occupations: Founder and Executive Chairperson of Space Trust, artist
- Known for: First Pakistani Astronaut, Virgin Galactic Founder Astronaut, First Pakistani at the North and South Poles, first Asian to skydive (tandem) Mount Everest, during First Everest Skydive 2008.
- Awards: Tamgha-e-Imtiaz (Medal of Excellence), 2011; Power 100 Trailblazer Award, 2013; Femina Middle East Women Award, 2016
- Space career

Virgin Galactic commercial astronaut
- Status: Active
- Time in space: ~15 min
- Mission: Galactic 04
- Website: namirasalim.com

Namira Salim (Urdu: نمیرا سلیم) is a Pakistani polar adventurer, astronaut and artist based in Monaco and Dubai. On the recommendation of the Pakistani government, she was in 2011 appointed as an honorary consul of Pakistan to Monaco, following her efforts to establish diplomatic relations between the two countries. She is the first Pakistani to have reached both the North Pole and the South Pole. Salim is the only Pakistani among the first 100 aspiring space tourists to purchase a ticket for Virgin Galactic's future commercial space liner. She became the first Pakistani astronaut, the first astronaut from Monaco, and the first female astronaut from the UAE to travel to space, traveling aboard Virgin Galactic on 6 October 2023.

On 23 March 2011, Asif Ali Zardari, President of Pakistan conferred on Salim the Tamgha-e-Imtiaz (Medal of Excellence) for achievement in sport, including her trips to the poles and the Everest skydiving event. She was awarded the Power 100 Trailblazer Award by Pakistan Power 100 in London in September 2013 for her efforts to promote international peace and harmony, and was placed on their "Women Power 100" list.

== Poles ==
Namira Salim is the first Pakistani to have reached both the North Pole in April 2007 and the South Pole in January 2008, respectively. She is also the first woman from Monaco and Dubai (UAE), her adopted countries, to have reached the two poles. At both poles, she hoisted the national flags of Pakistan, the UAE, Monaco and peace flags.

In 2008, Salim participated in the "First Everest Skydive 2008." She is the first Asian to skydive (tandem) Mount Everest from an altitude of 29,500 feet which surpasses the altitude of Mount Everest at 29,480 feet, and she landed at Syangboche Airport, the highest dropzone of the world, located at 12,350 feet, about 12 miles from Mount Everest which Salim refers to as the "third pole."

== Space tourism ==
In 2006 Salim joined Virgin Galactic's Founder Astronaut Club as one of the first 100 future space tourists for a sub-orbital space flight on Virgin Galactic's commercial space liner. In October 2007, Salim completed Virgin's two-day Sub-Orbital Spaceflight Training at the NASTAR (National Aerospace Training and Research) Center, in the world's most high-performance centrifuge, the STS-400, approved by the FAA. In February 2008, she presented her training certificate to former president of Pakistan Pervez Musharraf, who congratulated her.

It was planned that flights would begin as early as 2008, which would make Salim the first Pakistani to travel to space. Virgin Galactic confirmed on 12 Jan. 2022, that it is on track to resume commercial flights in Q2 of 2023, and successfully completed its fifth suborbital test flight on 25 May 2023 to keep the company on track to start commercial operations in June 2023. Accordingly, Virgin Galactic launched its first commercial flight to the edge of space with a crew of six astronauts on 29 June. As part of preparations for the launch, Founder Astronauts, including Salim have been fitted into their custom-built spacesuits designed by Under Armour. Over 600 people have purchased tickets for future sub-orbital spaceflights, which have been reserved at a price between $200,000 to $250,000 each, and include a ride of about five minutes in weightlessness. The company promotes its first 100 ticket-holders, including Salim, as "Founder Astronauts." The media often refers to Salim as the "First Pakistani Astronaut," which Salim was announced as, by the Government of Pakistan during an official press launch in August 2006, for her potential spaceflight with Virgin Galactic.

She finally flew to space on Virgin Galactic's Galactic 04 mission on 6 October 2023.

== Space Trust ==
Namira Salim is the Founder of Space Trust, a non-profit initiative that promotes Space as the New Frontier for Peace. Its inaugural event, an interactive exhibition and conference was held in the presence of Prince Albert II on 29 November 2015, for which Namira secured official partnerships with State Space Corporation - ROSCOSMOS, the Russian Space agency, SUPARCO, the National Space Agency of Pakistan and other leading establishments affiliated to the Princely Government. Three cosmonauts at the International Space Station delivered a video message during the conference. The main feature of the interactive exhibition, which contained seven customized APPs, was a 3.5 metres (11 ft) "Black Marble Earth" depicting the latest night view of Earth from Space, acquired by the Suomi NPP Satellite in nine days in April 2012 and thirteen days in October 2012, over 312 orbits.

On 10 February 2023, United Nations Office for Outer Space Affairs (UNOOSA) and Avio S.p.A. (Avio) announced a consortium led by the University of Nairobi in Kenya, alongside the University of Arizona from the United States of America and Space Trust, as the first awardee of the 'Accessing Space for All’ with Vega C program. The team plans to launch a CubeSat using the Vega C rocket.

== Honorary diplomat ==
Namira Salim has been a resident of the Principality of Monaco since 1997. She holds a Master of International Affairs from Columbia University and her personal efforts led to the diplomatic accreditation between Pakistan and Monaco in February 2009. The Sovereign Ordinance of Albert II, the Prince of Monaco, dated 1 August 2011 authorized Salim to practice her function as the First Honorary Consul of Pakistan to the Principality of Monaco. To mark the inauguration of the first Honorary Consulate of Pakistan, Salim organized a cocktail party in March 2012, at the Oceanographic Museum of Monaco, which was attended by the prince, government officials, and a representative of Shafkat Saeed, the Pakistani ambassador to Monaco.

Before she was appointed as honorary consul, she mobilised funds for Pakistan's earthquake of 2005 and devastating floods of 2010. Her efforts led to about US$0.5 Million raised for humanitarian disasters facing the nation via the government of Monaco and for subsequent reconstruction efforts. In 2007, she served as Honorary Ambassador of Tourism for Pakistan, appointed by the Ministry of Tourism.

== Creative works ==
In May 2002 Salim held a solo exhibit of jeweled objects called "Peace Making with Nation Souls" as an official supporting event to the UN General Assembly Special Session for Children. In October 2000, she exhibited solo at UNESCO's executive board under the theme Peace & Soul. In September 2000, Namira held a solo exhibition "Purely A Soul Affair". In May 2011, she launched her documentary "Beyond the Poles" in Dubai, aimed at inspiring youth. The event was held under the patronage of Sheikh Ahmed bin Saeed Al Maktoum, chairman of the Emirates airline and the Emirates Group. The film documented her journey to the poles, skydiving trip, and events with Branson and Virgin Galactic since 2006. It premiered in Pakistan at the Airforce Academy in Risalpur in May 2011, and in France during the OIC Day at UNESCO in September 2011.

Salim has designed a collection of astronomically accurate jewels, under the brand Namira Monaco, Jewels from Space. A special edition of her collection was included in the Everyone Wins Nominee Gift Bags given to Oscar Nominees in major acting and directing categories during the 89th Academy Awards in 2017. A special edition of her collection was also included in the Official Grammy Gift Bags during the 59th Annual Grammy Awards.

== Music ==
On 31 May 2020 Salim's debut solo single, ‘’Follow Me To The Moon’’ was released by Spinnup, a global digital music distribution service owned by Universal Music Group.

== Awards ==
On 23 March 2011, Asif Ali Zardari, President of Pakistan conferred on Salim the Tamgha-e-Imtiaz (Pride of Pakistan) for achievement in the area of sport, including her expeditions to the north and south poles and her Everest skydive. She was awarded the Power 100 Trailblazer Award by Pakistan Power 100 in London in September 2013 for her efforts to promote international peace and harmony, and was placed on their "Women Power 100" list. Salim was a recipient of the Femina Middle East Women Award in 2016 for being "unstoppable in Space Exploration".
