= Galactic 04 =

2023 private crewed suborbital spaceflight

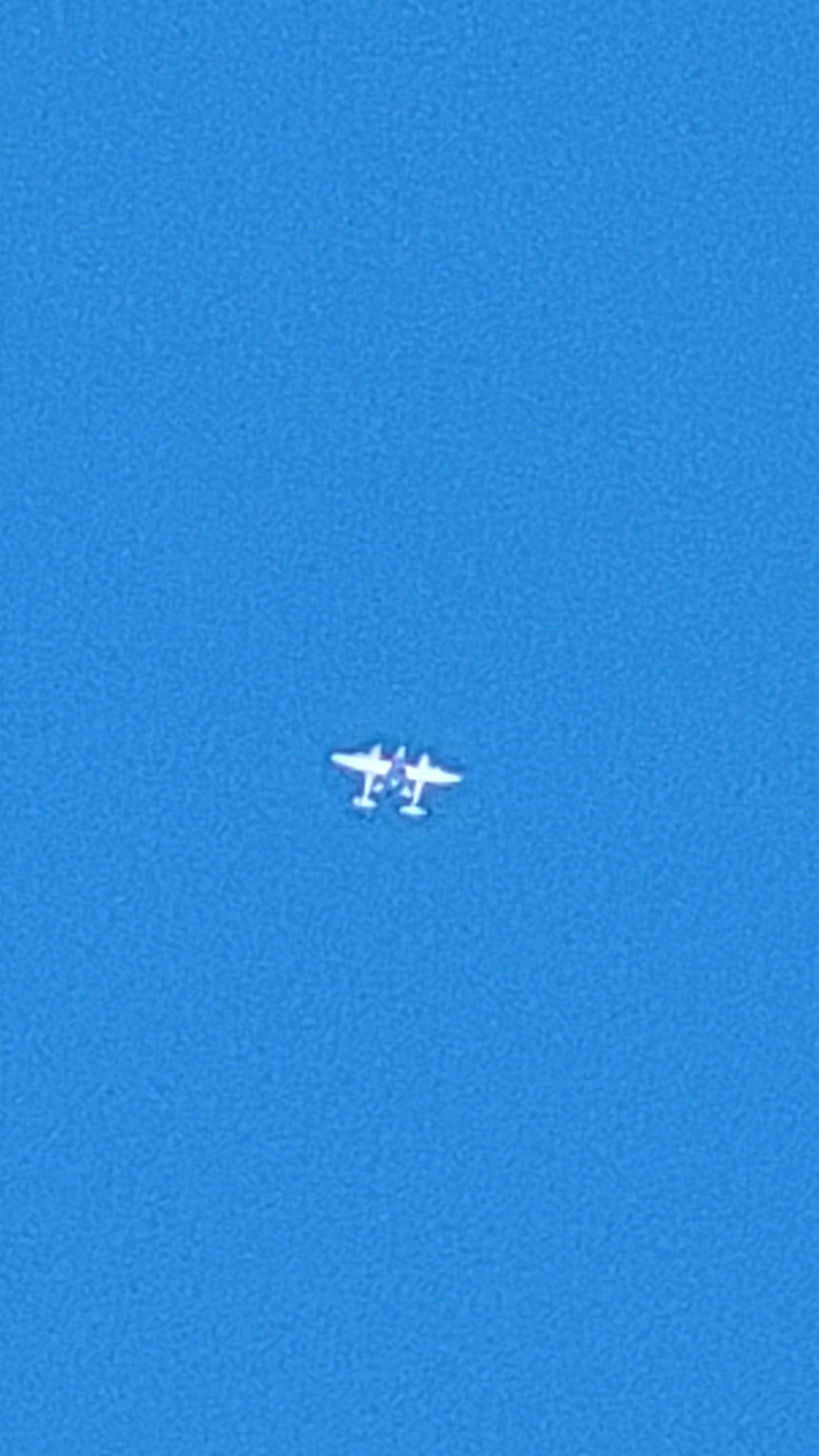
- VSS Unity attached to VMS Eve prior to release during the Galactic-04 mission
- Mission type: Crewed sub-orbital spaceflight
- Operator: Virgin Galactic
- Mission duration: 14 min and 23 seconds
- Apogee: 87.4 km (54.3 mi)

Spacecraft properties
- Spacecraft: VSS Unity
- Spacecraft type: SpaceShipTwo
- Manufacturer: The Spaceship Company

Crew
- Crew size: 6
- Members: Kelly Latimer; CJ Sturckow; Beth Moses; Ron Rosano; Trevor Beattie; Namira Salim

Start of mission
- Launch date: 6 October 2023, 15:28 UTC
- Launch site: Spaceport America Runway 34
- Deployed from: VMS Eve

End of mission
- Landing date: 6 October 2023, 16:23 UTC
- Landing site: Spaceport America Runway 34
- Galactic 04 mission patch VSS Unity spaceflights

Galactic 04 was a crewed sub-orbital spaceflight of the SpaceShipTwo-class VSS Unity, which launched on 6 October 2023. It was the fourth commercial spaceflight and ninth overall spaceflight for aerospace company Virgin Galactic.

== Crew ==
Galactic 04's crew included three private passengers and three Virgin Galactic employees. Namira Salim was the first person from Pakistan to go into space.

Position	Crew
Commander	(United States) Kelly Latimer; Second spaceflight
Pilot	(United States) CJ Sturckow; Ninth spaceflight
Astronaut instructor	(United States) Beth Moses; Sixth spaceflight
Spaceflight Participant	(United States) Ron Rosano; First spaceflight
Spaceflight Participant	(United Kingdom) Trevor Beattie; First spaceflight
Spaceflight Participant	(Pakistan) Namira Salim; First spaceflight

== See also ==
- List of spaceflight launches in July–December 2023
