= Whitmore High School =

Location
- Porlock Avenue, Harrow, HA2 0AD; England
- 51°34′23″N 0°21′11″W

Information
- Type: Community school, Comprehensive
- Local authority: Harrow
- Specialist: Science
- Department for Education URN: 102239 Tables
- Ofsted: Reports
- Chair of Governors: Emma Watson Stabler
- Headteacher: James Rebbitt
- Gender: Mixed
- Age: 11 to 19
- Enrolment: 1653
- Website: www.whitmore.harrow.sch.uk

Whitmore High School is a state secondary school in the London Borough of Harrow. The school's students are mostly drawn from the wider Harrow area. In 2025, the school was judged "Outstanding" by Ofsted for the third time.

The current headteacher of the school is James Rebbitt. Prior to him, Susan Hammond was the headteacher, leaving in December 2023.

== History ==
Whitmore High School was created in September 1974 when the London Borough of Harrow adopted a comprehensive system of education. It was formerly two schools on one site, Lascelles Boys' Secondary School and Lascelles Girls' Secondary School.

Whitmore is now an established community comprehensive school with a sixth form and is a specialist Science College. In September 2010 the school moved to a new building, designed to support modern education and specialist facilities.

Whitmore High School's last three Ofsted inspections, one in 2007, one in 2015, and the latest one in 2025, have all judged the school as "Outstanding".

== Former pupils ==
- Dev Patel, actor, appeared in movies including Slumdog Millionaire
- Owen Hurcum, former mayor of Bangor, Gwynedd
- Stephen Marks, CEO and founder of French Connection UK (FCUK)
