= Roxeth =

Coordinates: 51.570°N 0.347°W

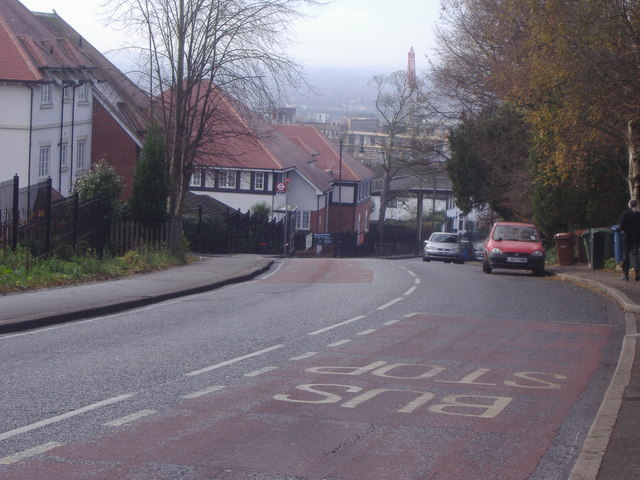
- Roxeth Hill in 2008

- Location within Greater London
- Population: 11,621 (2011 Census. Ward)
- London borough: Harrow
- Ceremonial county: Greater London
- Region: London
- Country: England
- Sovereign state: United Kingdom
- Post town: Harrow
- Postcode district: HA1, HA2
- Post town: MIDDLESEX
- Dialling code: 020
- Police: Metropolitan
- Fire: London
- Ambulance: London
- UK Parliament: Harrow West
- London Assembly: Brent and Harrow

Roxeth was a hamlet in the ancient Harrow on the Hill parish, which now forms part of the London Borough of Harrow in Greater London, England.

The ancient parish of Harrow on the Hill, or simply Harrow, was one of the largest parishes in Middlesex. Apart from Harrow Town, it encompassed a number of smaller settlements, including Roxeth itself, Greenhill, Harrow Weald, Kenton, Preston, Uxendon, Tokyngton, Sudbury, Wembley and Alperton.

Roxeth village was adjacent to Harrow on the Hill, along the main road to the south. The name Roxeth is thought to derive from a contraction of 'Rooks Heath' and much of the land between Roxeth and Sudbury was indeed heathland as far as the early 19th century. A mediaeval moated manor existed until the mid-20th century. On its site stands a council housing estate.

Development around the crossroads at the bottom of Harrow on the Hill, an area known as Roxeth Corner, was under way in the early 19th century, using brick from the nearby brickworks in Lower Road. A Wesleyan Chapel was built soon after 1817 on London Hill (now called Roxeth Hill). In 1864, the Wesleyans moved to a new larger chapel in Lower Road, which has since become the Welsh Congregational Chapel. By 1880, the former Wesleyan chapel had been converted to an elementary school which it remained until at least the 1930s. Christ Church on Roxeth Hill, which was built in 1862 by the celebrated architect George Gilbert Scott as a chapel of ease to St Mary's Harrow on the Hill, has cemetery records that begin in 1863 and go on till at least 1942. In 1906, the stone was laid for a Salvation Army Hall (presently vacant) on Roxeth Hill, adjacent to the Half Moon Pub which was there since at least 1880.

South Harrow and Roxeth railway station, on the Marylebone to High Wycombe mainline, was opened in 1926 at the far end of the village and renamed Northolt Park Station in 1929. Roxeth is now also served by South Harrow tube station.

The name of the parish lives on as a current Ward of the London Borough of Harrow and in local schools, Roxeth First and Middle Schools as well as Rooks Heath School (formerly known as Rooks Heath High School and, before that, Roxeth Manor Secondary School for Boys and Roxeth Manor Secondary School for Girls), as well as in the name of the parish church, Christ Church Roxeth. Also the oldest children's voluntary group in the Borough, the Roxeth & Harrow Company of the Church Lads' and Church Girls' Brigade, was formed on 1 October 1894. It received the Freedom of Entry to the Borough, the first civilian group to be such honoured, in 1994. This was "In recognition of its centenary and the outstanding continuous service provided by the Brigade to the Harrow Area". Their near neighbours, the Royal British Legion and 1454 Sqn Air Training Corps received same in 1996 and 2014 respectively.

Roxonian Football Club was formed in 1933. It is now called Harrow Borough F.C. and plays at Earlsmead Stadium on the west side of Roxeth, on former common land known as Dobbs Field.

== Politics ==
Roxeth is part of the Harrow West constituency for elections to the House of Commons of the United Kingdom.

Roxeth is part of the Roxeth ward for elections to Harrow London Borough Council.
