= Northolt Park railway station =

National Rail station in London, England

Northolt Park
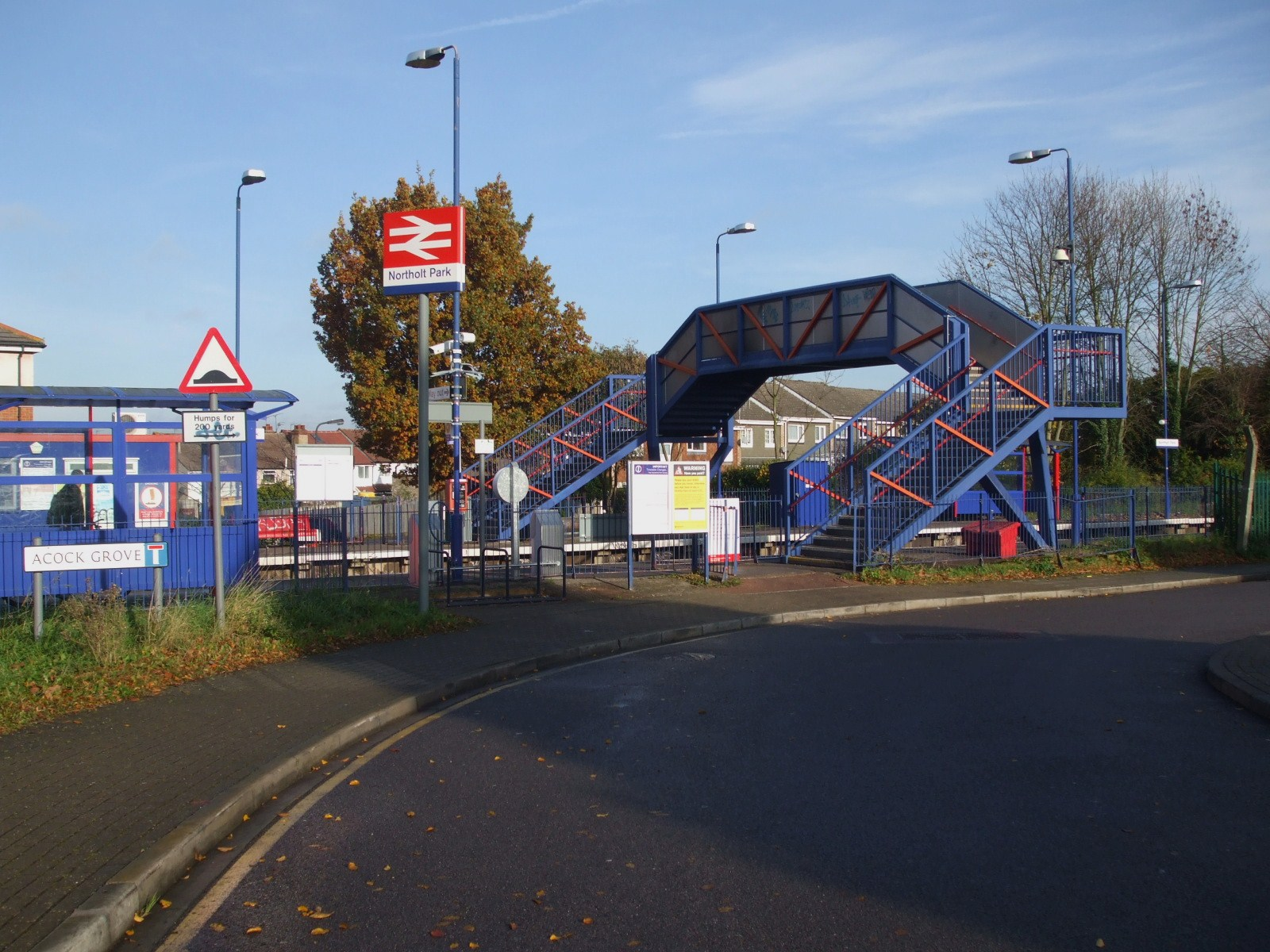
- Interactive map of Northolt Park

General information
- Location: Northolt
- Local authority: London Borough of Ealing
- Managed by: Chiltern Railways
- Station code: NLT
- DfT category: E
- Number of platforms: 2
- Fare zone: 5

National Rail annual entry and exit
- 2020–21: ▼57,584
- 2021–22: ▲0.123 million
- 2022–23: ▲0.151 million
- 2023–24: ▼0.143 million
- 2024–25: ▲0.176 million

Key dates
- 1926: Opened

Other information
- External links: Departures; Facilities
- Coordinates: 51.5574°N 0.3595°W

Northolt Park railway station is a National Rail station in Northolt, Greater London. It is in Cadogan Close and spans the boundary between the London Borough of Harrow and the London Borough of Ealing, with a footbridge connecting the north side (leading to Roxeth and South Harrow) to the south side (leading to Northolt and Greenford). South Harrow Tube Station on the Piccadilly line is 0.7 miles (1.1 km) by foot from Northolt Park Station. Northolt Underground station on the Central line is less than 1 mile (1.6 km) away and is accessible by the 140 and SL9 buses from Northolt Road.

== History ==
The Great Central Railway line to High Wycombe from Marylebone opened in 1906 but this station (originally known as South Harrow and Roxeth) was not opened until 1926, being given its current name in 1929.

== Services ==
All services at Northolt Park are operated by Chiltern Railways.

The typical weekday off-peak service is one train per hour in each direction between London Marylebone and High Wycombe, with additional services calling at the station during the peak hours.

On weekends, northbound services are extended beyond High Wycombe to and from Aylesbury via Princes Risborough.

| Preceding station | National Rail | Following station |
|---|---|---|
| South Ruislip | Chiltern Railways Chiltern Main Line | Sudbury Hill Harrow |

== Connections ==
London Buses routes 140, 395, 398, 487, SL9 and N140 serve the station.
