= Nicole Farhi =

French sculptor (born 1946)

- Born: 1946 (age 79–80); Nice, France
- Occupations: Fashion designer, artist, sculptor
- Spouse: David Hare (m. 1992)
- Relatives: Moris Farhi (cousin)

Nicole Farhi, Lady Hare, CBE (born 1946) is a French former fashion designer. In mid-career in London, she took up sculpture and, on retirement from the fashion industry, became a sculptor.

== Early life and education ==
Born in 1946 in Nice on the French Riviera, Nicole Farhi is the daughter of Sephardic Jews who immigrated to France from Turkey after World War I. Her father sold rugs and lighting. She attended synagogue with her grandparents. Members of her family endured concentration camps during the Second World War.

Farhi studied both art and fashion in early 1960s Paris and, needing to be self-sufficient, started her career as a freelancer there in 1967 before moving to London, England, in 1969 or 1973.

== Career in fashion ==
In 1978, Farhi was employed by Stephen Marks to head up his company's design studio in Bow, East London, on the French Connection label. She was given a free hand to design. She was also commissioned to design theatre and cinema costumes. In 1982, Marks assisted Farhi in launching the eponymous Nicole Farhi high-end fashion label within the French Connection group. The label opened shops worldwide, including London and New York in 1999. The success of her first label was followed by Nicole Farhi for Men in 1989. The Nicole Farhi Home Collection was launched in 1998 and a concept store named 202 opened in 2002, featuring homeware, clothing lines and all day brasserie.

On 15 March 2010, French Connection announced the sale of the brand and retail chains to OpenGate Capital for up to £5 million. Entering administration in 2013, the labels had six stores, supplied major stores such as John Lewis and had concessions in other department stores. Administrators Zolfo Cooper were appointed on 3 July 2013 to advise on sale or restructuring of the UK shops and associated retail outlets located within Harvey Nichols, House of Fraser and Selfridges.

== Midlife pivot into sculpture ==
In the mid-1980s, Farhi took up sculpture as a hobby, under the tutelage of artist Jean Gibson in her private studio. During her fashion career, Farhi would work one day a week and at weekends in her own studio. After many years of juggling the two, she became a full-time sculptor. She turned her back on fashion and focused on sculpture, with a first solo exhibition in 2019.

Her Edinburgh Art Festival exhibition contained 25 clay busts of her favourite literary figures, including Oscar Wilde, Françoise Sagan, Muriel Spark and Joan Didion, all under 20 centimetres high.

Farhi is a member of the Royal Society of Sculptors.

== Personal life ==
Farhi and Marks' professional relationship resulted in a personal relationship, and the couple had a daughter, Candice Marks, before separating. Farhi married British playwright David Hare in 1992. They met when she designed the costumes for his play Murmuring Judges. Eduardo Paolozzi, her friend and mentor, was a witness at their wedding.

She is a cousin of the writer and human rights campaigner Moris Farhi.

In February 2007, Farhi was a signatory to the declaration of Independent Jewish Voices, calling for an open and critical debate on Israel and criticising certain Jewish organisations' unconditional support of Israel in relation to Palestine.

== Honours ==
- 2007: CBE, for services the British fashion industry
- 2010: Legion of Honour, France
