= Trevor Beattie =

British advertising executive

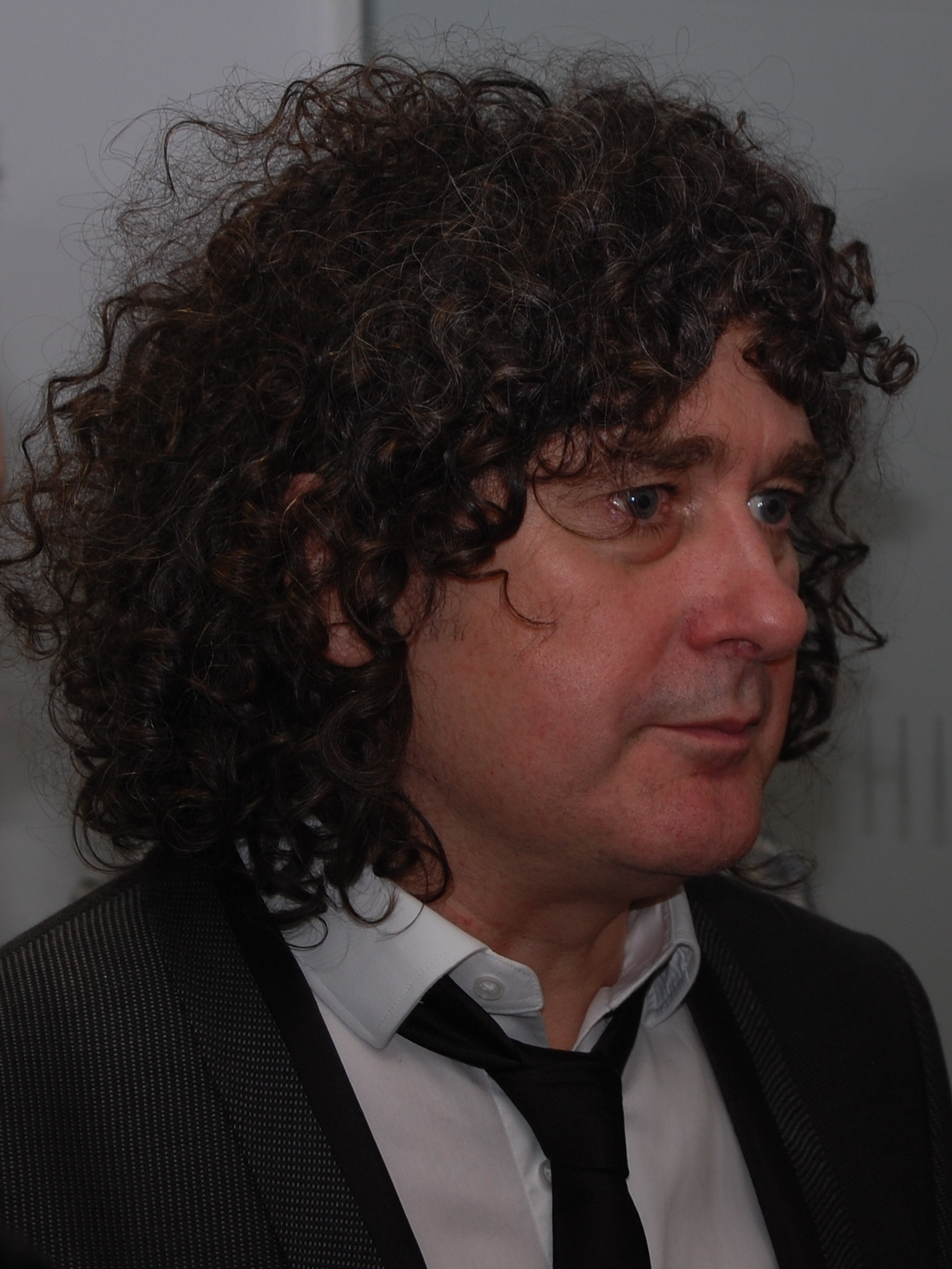
- Beattie at Birmingham City University in November 2013
- Born: 24 December 1959 (age 66); Birmingham, Warwickshire, England
- Education: Wolverhampton Polytechnic
- Occupation: Advertising executive
- Organization(s): Founding partner and creative director of BMB
- Space career

Virgin Galactic commercial astronaut
- Time in space: 14 min and 23 seconds
- Missions: Galactic 04

Trevor Beattie (born 24 December 1959) is a British advertising executive. He is a founding partner, chairman and creative director of Beattie McGuinness Bungay (BMB), and was formerly the chairman and creative director of TBWA London. Considered one of the leading figures in advertising in Britain, Beattie has been responsible for a number of high-profile and sometimes controversial advertising campaigns, most notably the "fcuk" campaign for French Connection and the 1994 Playtex Wonderbra campaign featuring Eva Herzigová. He has managed campaigns for the Labour Party, being a friend of Peter Mandelson and a supporter of New Labour. Beattie masterminded the ad campaigns for the Labour party in the 2001 and 2005 general elections.

== Early life ==
Beattie was one of eight children born to Jack and Ada Beattie in Birmingham, West Midlands (then Warwickshire). His father, who was originally from Lisburn, County Down, worked as a car mechanic. The family lived in the Balsall Heath suburb of the city. Beattie was the first member of his family to enter into higher education, studying at Moseley School of Art, alongside UB40's Ali Campbell and Terence Wilson, and subsequently completing a degree in graphic design and photography at Wolverhampton Polytechnic.

== Career ==
In 2002 he was listed by Marketing magazine as the 9th Most Influential Person in Media and in 2003 was voted IPA Best of the Best Awards Creative Director of the Year.

In 2010 Beattie tried to win back the account from the Labour Party by spending over £12,000 of his own money fighting the Conservative Party in Wolverhampton but failed to unseat any of the eight politicians he was attacking.

8 February 2011, Trevor was granted an Honorary Doctorate at the Birmingham City University. Within his acceptance speech Trevor announced he would offer a scholarship to forthcoming students in honor of his lecturer / teacher John Lowe.

Trevor Beattie's voice
recorded November 2013

== New projects ==
Beattie has also moved into the movie industry, producing the Bafta winning movie Moon, directed by Duncan Jones in 2008.

Since 2006, Beattie has devised the marketing campaign for Richard Branson's Virgin Galactic Space Tourism Programme. On 6 October 2023, he flew to space on board Galactic 04.

In November 2011 The Jack and Ada Beattie Foundation was launched. The Jack and Ada Beattie Foundation supports victims of social injustice by providing grants to both organisations and individuals under the themes of 'Dignity', 'Freedom' and 'Sanctuary'. The Foundation was set up in honour of Trevor Beattie's parents.

He has expressed interest in making a film on the life and career of Coronation Street actress Jean Alexander who played Hilda Ogden for nearly 25 years.
