= Stephen Marks =

British fashion retailer

- Born: Stephen Anthony Solomon Marks; 23 May 1946 (age 80); Harrow, Middlesex, England
- Occupations: Fashion retailer and wholesaler
- Years active: 1972–present
- Known for: Founder, chairman and chief executive of French Connection

Stephen Anthony Solomon Marks (born 23 May 1946) is a British fashion retailer and founder, chairman and chief executive of the French Connection brand.

== Early life and career ==
Stephen Anthony Solomon Marks was born in Harrow, north London, the son of Jewish hairdressers and went to the local secondary modern school. He was a promising tennis player as a teenager, playing at Fred Perry's old club Herga and winning a junior prize at Wimbledon.

Marks began working as a salesman for the coat-maker Andre Peters and French fashion designer Louis Féraud, before setting up Stephen Marks London in the late 1960s to produce his own suit and coat designs. Marks had already ventured into wholesaling, earning the nickname 'the hotpants king' after spotting the trend for short shorts in Paris and importing stock to sell in Miss Selfridge.

== French Connection ==
Marks established the French Connection women's label in 1972 – a year after the film of the same name was released. The name reportedly came about because, via a business contact in France, he managed to acquire 3,000 Indian cheesecloth shirts that could be resold in the UK at a large profit.

By 1975, Nicole Farhi was working for Marks, designing a mid-price label known as Stephen Marks and a French Connection by Stephen Marks label at the budget end of the market. Marks' brands were singled out that year by The Guardian's Angela Neustatter – along with Christopher McDonnell, Jeff Banks and Stirling Cooper – as labels likely to survive the growing plethora of mass-market anonymous brands in the UK fashion industry. Heading up the company's design studio in Bow, East London, Farhi helped launch a men's label in 1976. She subsequently became Marks' partner and the couple had a child together. Marks assisted Farhi in launching an eponymous higher-end label within the French Connection group in 1983, remaining involved with the Nicole Farhi label until it was sold in 2010.

After Marks floated the French Connection brand on the London Stock Exchange in 1984, he was listed as the 15th richest man in Britain, but by the late 1980s the company was in trouble. Marks regained directorial control of French Connection in 1991, changing its image with the 'fcuk' advertising campaign. Today the brand operates in 30 countries and Marks' other business interests via French Connection include the clothing and clothing/homewear brands Great Plains and Toast. Toast now has eleven UK stores.

== Other interests ==
Marks is a member of the All-England Club and has helped to establish tennis academies in the UK and Israel to develop young players. At one time he had a substantial share in Hard Rock Café. He has also been involved with films, helping to finance Lock, Stock and Two Smoking Barrels, Snatch, Layer Cake and Kick-Ass.
