= Harrow Arts Centre =

Professional arts venue in the London Borough of Harrow

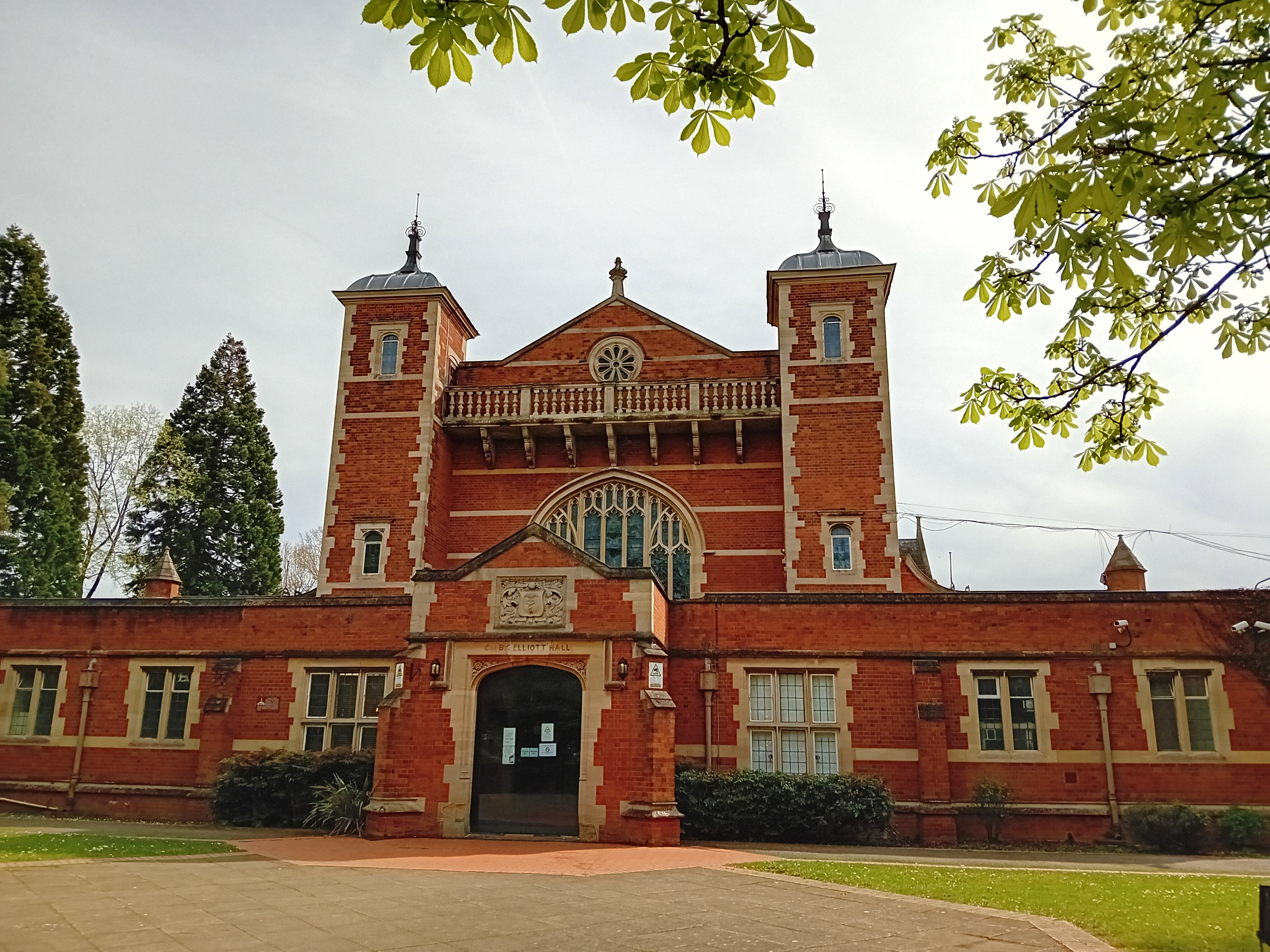
- The main entrance to the Elliott Hall building, Harrow Arts Centre.
- Interactive map of Harrow Arts Centre
- Address: 171 Uxbridge Road, Pinner, HA5 4EA; London Borough of Harrow; England
- Coordinates: 51.6085°N 0.3638°W
- Capacity: 404 and 120

Website
- www.harrowarts.com

Harrow Arts Centre (HAC) is a professional arts venue in the London Borough of Harrow. HAC is located in Hatch End, Pinner, North London, in the Elliott Hall and other buildings that were previously part of the Royal Commercial Travellers School. It is the only dedicated performing arts venue in the borough. Since 2022 the building has also hosted meetings of Harrow Council and housed the mayor's parlour.

== History ==
The Elliott Hall was built in 1904 and was the assembly hall to a much larger, but since demolished, building of the Royal Commercial Travellers School designed by Herbert Osborn Cresswell. It is named after Bignell George Elliott, one time pupil and scholar at the RCT, who was President of the Committee tasked with the funding and building of the hall.

After the closure of the school in 1967 the site was purchased by Harrow Council to house Harrow College of Further Education and St. Teresa's School. In 1987 Harrow College of Further Education closed down. A year later, the arts venue began operating at the site. Harrow Council has been managing Harrow Arts Centre since 2007.

Prior to its move to the current Hatch End site, Harrow Arts Centre was based at a much smaller venue in Harrow Weald.

== Current activities ==
HAC comprises two performance spaces with dressing rooms, a dedicated dance studio, 5 art rooms, an ICT suite, and 8 multi-purpose rehearsal spaces and meeting rooms. The Elliott Hall is the largest performance space, with 438 seats. The Studio is a black box performance space with 120 seats.

The Gallery at HAC is a contemporary art gallery, and exhibitions are also displayed year round in the Corridor Galleries.

HAC presents a programme of performances, events, exhibitions, and workshops throughout the year, both programmed by the in house team and presented by companies and individuals who hire performance or classroom space. The programme includes regular work with community groups and schools; for example, in 2012 HAC worked with artist Alistair Lambert to create a mural with Years 3 and 5 at St Joseph's Catholic Primary School for the subway next to their school.

As well as the HAC team, the venue houses Harrow Music Services, and Harrow Council's Adult and Community and Family Learning Team. The venue's two resident companies are Srishti and Bearfoot School of Performing Arts. Hatch End library is within the arts centre building, and Hatch End swimming pool is beside the dance studio. The cafe, Simply Daisy's, and bistro are run by the same company who run the popular Daisy's in the Park cafe in Pinner.

In 2019, a competition was launched to select an architect to create plans for additional classrooms and workshops for the Gallery, which was won by Chris Dyson Architects.

In 2022 Harrow Council moved its full council meetings and mayor's parlour to the building following the decision to close its former headquarters at Harrow Civic Centre.

== Listed building ==
The Grade II listed B G Elliott Hall was the assembly hall to the much larger, but now demolished, building of the Royal Commercial Travellers' School. The site of the demolished school building is now occupied by a supermarket. The listing of the building by National Heritage describes it has a "Neo-Tudor, 9-bays with cross wing at east end. Red brick with stone dressings. Mullion and transom windows. Entrance at west end in single-storey wing of 7-bays under traceried west window. Square corner towers dominate the west end with a connecting balustered walkway spanning the gabled elevation."
