= Rooks Heath School =

Location
- Eastcote Lane; South Harrow, Greater London, HA2 9AH; England; 51°33′48″N 0°22′13″W

Information
- Type: Academy
- Department for Education URN: 137198 Tables
- Ofsted: Reports
- Chairman of the Governors: Pauline Hughes
- Headteacher: M Manderson
- Gender: Mixed
- Age: 11 to 18
- Enrolment: 1'149
- Colours: Sky Blue, Navy blue, White, Black
- Website: https://www.rooksheath.harrow.sch.uk/

Rooks Heath School is a state secondary school and sixth form, in South Harrow in the London Borough of Harrow. It is a mixed comprehensive school serving a culturally and socially diverse community. Built on the grounds of a former hospital, the school has approximately 1000 pupils. The school has been an academy since 1 August 2011.

== History ==
Roxeth Manor Secondary School was opened on Eastcote Lane by Middlesex County Council in 1932. It became a secondary modern school following the Education Act 1944.

The secondary school was renamed Rooks Heath High School in September 1974 when the London Borough of Harrow adopted the comprehensive system of education. In 1991, it was the subject of a BBC documentary on class identity among English schoolchildren.

The school gained specialist status as a Business and Enterprise College, using the name Rooks Heath College for Business and Enterprise.

The school converted to academy status and was renamed Rooks Heath School on 1 August 2011.

== Notable alumni ==
- Susan Hall – Member of the London Assembly
- Rajesh Maru – Cricketer
