= Whitefriars School =

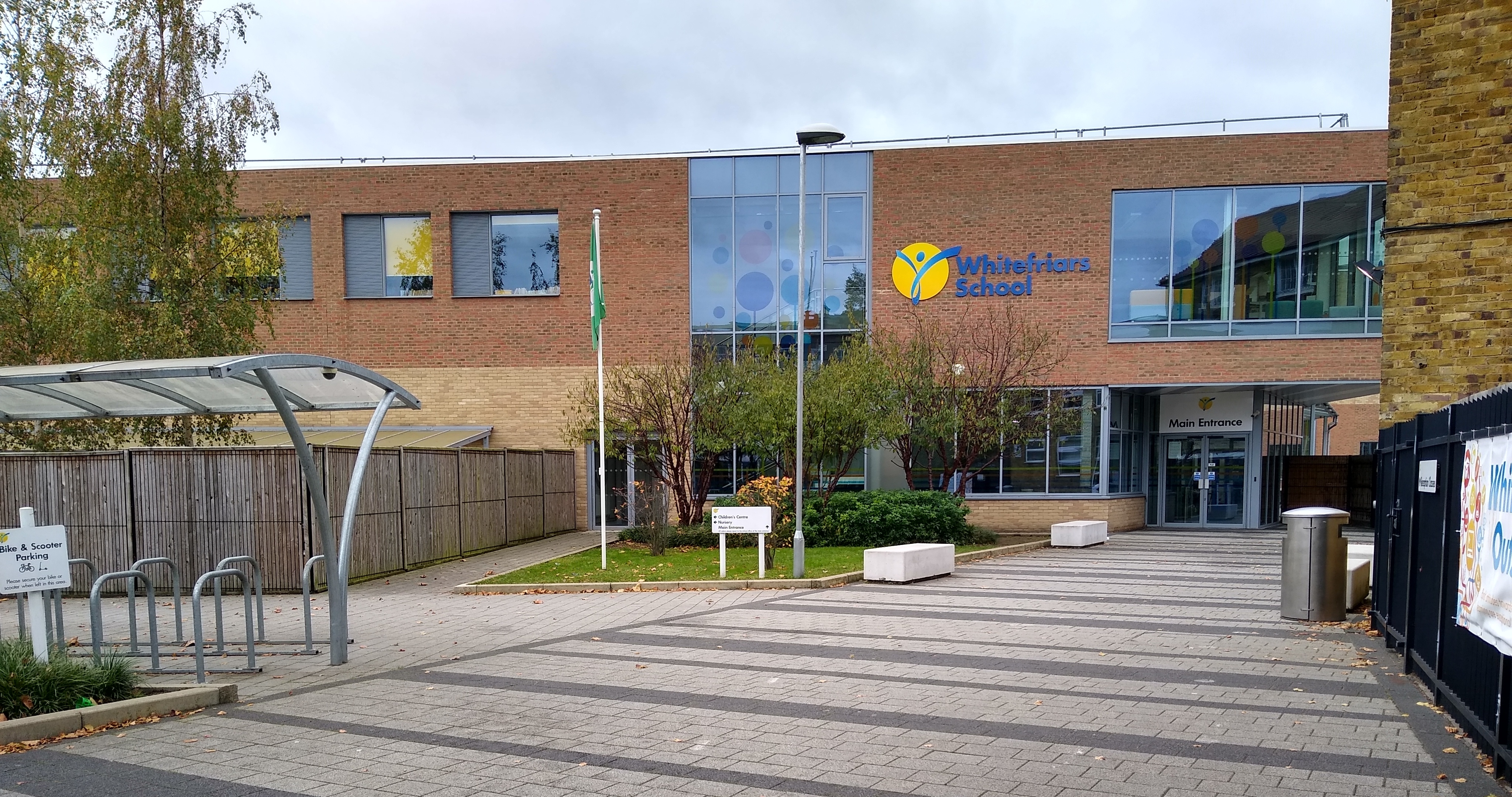

Location
- Whitefriars Avenue; Wealdstone; London, HA3 5RQ; England; 51.5975°N 0.3412°W

Information
- Type: Academy
- Local authority: Harrow
- Department for Education URN: 141071 Tables
- Ofsted: Reports
- Headteacher: Pritam Vekaria
- Gender: Co-educational
- Age: 3 to 18
- Website: www.whitefriarsschool.net

Whitefriars School is a co-educational all-through school and sixth form located in the Wealdstone area of the London Borough of Harrow, England.

Previously a community primary school administered by Harrow London Borough Council, in July 2014 Whitefriars School converted to academy status. New buildings were then constructed at the site, allowing the school to open a secondary department in September 2015.

Whitefriars School offers GCSEs as programmes of study for pupils, while students in the sixth form have the option to study from a range of A Levels. The sixth form is part of the Harrow Sixth Form Collegiate.
