= French Connection (clothing) =

British apparel company

French Connection Group PLC
- Company logo
- Type: Private company
- Industry: Clothing
- Founded: 1972
- Headquarters: London, England
- Area served: United Kingdom; United States; Canada; European Union
- Key people: Stephen Marks, Chairman/CEO; Lee Williams, CFO; Neil Williams, COO
- Products: Clothing, accessories, watches, perfumes, toiletries, glasses, etc.
- Revenue: £71.5 million (2021)
- Number of employees: 626 (2021)
- Website: frenchconnection.com

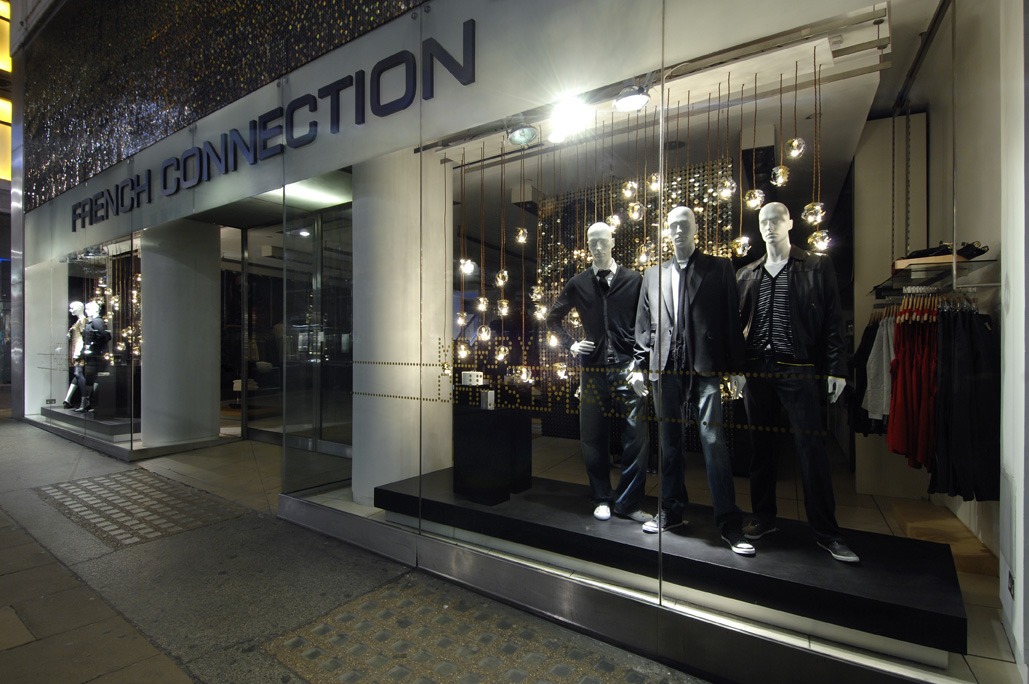
French Connection

French Connection (also branded as FCUK or fcuk) is a UK-based global retailer and wholesaler of fashion clothing, accessories and homeware. Founded in the early 1970s by Stephen Marks, who also serves as chairman and chief executive, it is based in London and its parent French Connection Group PLC was formerly listed on the London Stock Exchange. It was acquired by MIP Holdings Ltd in 2021.

French Connection distributes its clothing and accessories through its own stores in the UK, US, and Canada and through franchise and wholesale arrangements globally. The company became notorious for the use of the "fcuk" initialism in its advertising campaigns in the early 2000s.

Other brands currently within the group include Great Plains, Toast and YMC. Former brands include Nicole Farhi.

== Brand history ==
Stephen Marks, who started out in business in 1969 as the Stephen Marks brand, established French Connection in 1972 — a year after the film of the same name was released. Initially designed as a mid-market women's brand, he has said the name came about because he managed to acquire a large shipment of Indian cheesecloth shirts — via a French contact — that could be resold in the UK at a large profit. The business expanded into menswear in 1976.

In 1978, Nicole Farhi joined French Connection as a designer. In 1983, her eponymous higher-end label was launched by the French Connection parent group and this was not sold until 2010.

After Marks floated the French Connection brand on the London Stock Exchange in 1984, he was listed as the 15th richest man in Britain, but, by the late 1980s, the company was in trouble. He took control of the direction of French Connection again in 1991.

In 2017, French Connection appointed two new independent directors, after facing pressure from investors. In February of that same year, Sports Direct bought Schroders' 11% stake in French Connection.

On 5 February 2021, the company made a regulatory announcement that The Board of French Connection Group Plc notes the recent share price movement and confirms that it has received separate approaches from each of Spotlight Brands in conjunction with Gordon Brothers International LLC ("Spotlight") and Go Global Retail in conjunction with HMJ International Services Ltd ("Go Global") as potential offerors for French Connection Group Plc, each of which may or may not result in an offer for the company.

=== FCUK branding controversy ===
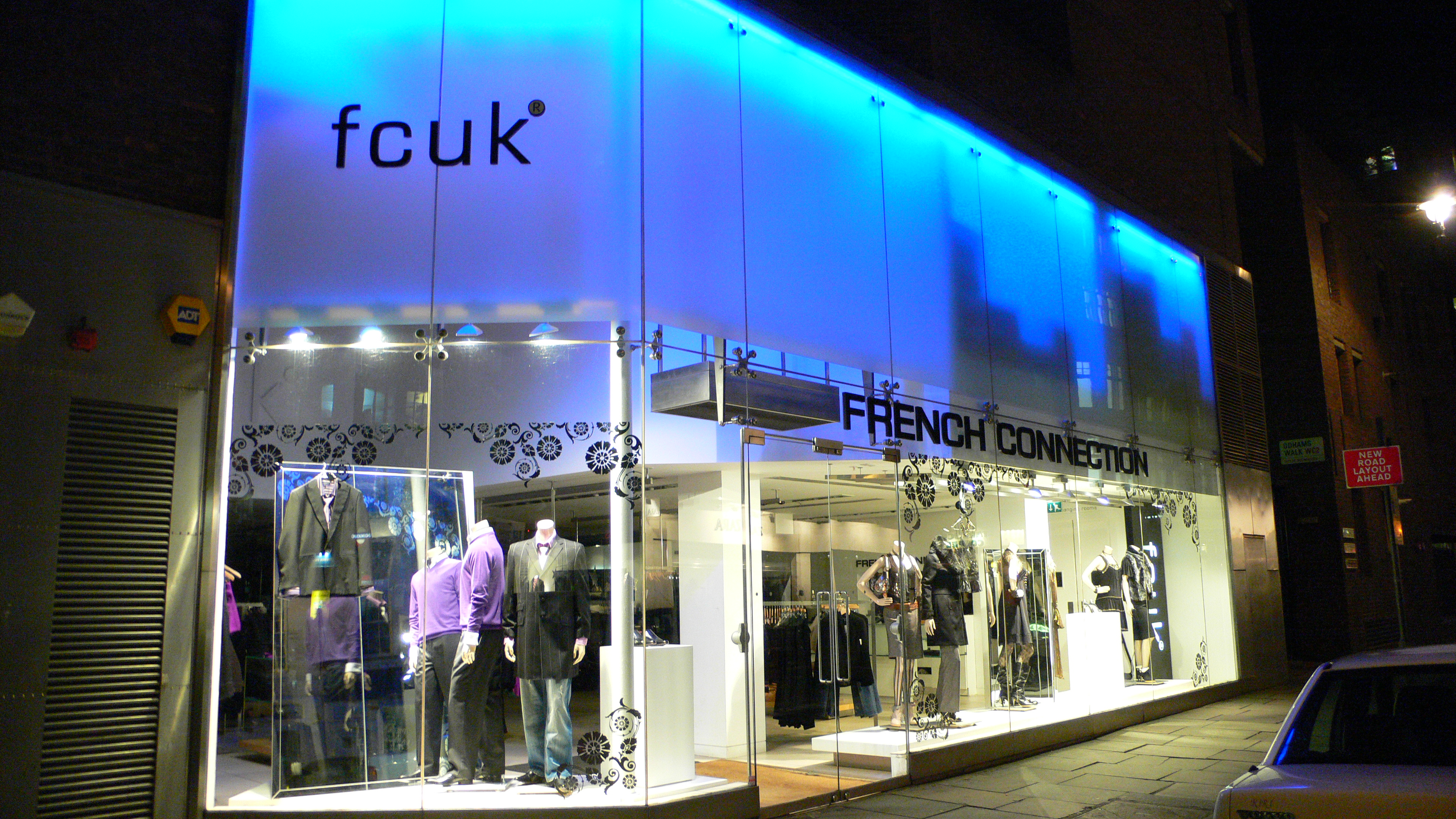
French Connection store in Covent Garden, London

French Connection began using the branding "fcuk" (usually written in lowercase) in advertising after 1991 when Marks regained control. Reportedly, the first use of the initialism was on faxes sent between Hong Kong and London offices, headed "FCHK to FCUK". Marks said in a subsequent interview that the faxes were not intended to be rude. The advertising campaign came about after he was so impressed by a bra advert featuring Eva Herzigová that he contacted the advertising executive behind it, Trevor Beattie, even though the company did not have a budget for an advertising campaign at the time. It was Beattie who spotted the marketing potential of the initialism and a campaign was launched around it.

Being deliberately identical to a common typo of the taboo word "fuck", French Connection's use of "fcuk" caused widespread controversy. In addition, there was heavy criticism that French Connection and other advertisers are "free to put up offensive posters, gain huge impact from them, and then — when they are ordered down (often after the campaign has run its course) — to notch up even more publicity". Following a number of complaints about advertising campaigns using the initialism, the UK's Advertising Standards Authority requested that the company submit all poster campaigns for approval before running them. In the United States, the American Family Association urged a boycott of fcuk products.

The success of the branding in raising French Connection's profile led to similar tactics from other organisations. French Connection launched a trademark infringement case in the London High Court challenging the owner of "First Consultants UK Ltd", a computer company, over its use of the "fcuk" initialism. The case found that the internet domain fcuk.com was registered prior to French Connection applying for the UK Trademark and its claim for passing off was dismissed. Mr Justice Rattee refused to grant an injunction, describing French Connection's use of the initialism as "a tasteless and obnoxious campaign." The company threatened legal action against the political youth organisation Conservative Future, which had briefly adopted the spoof abbreviation "cfuk" (short for "Conservative Future UK").

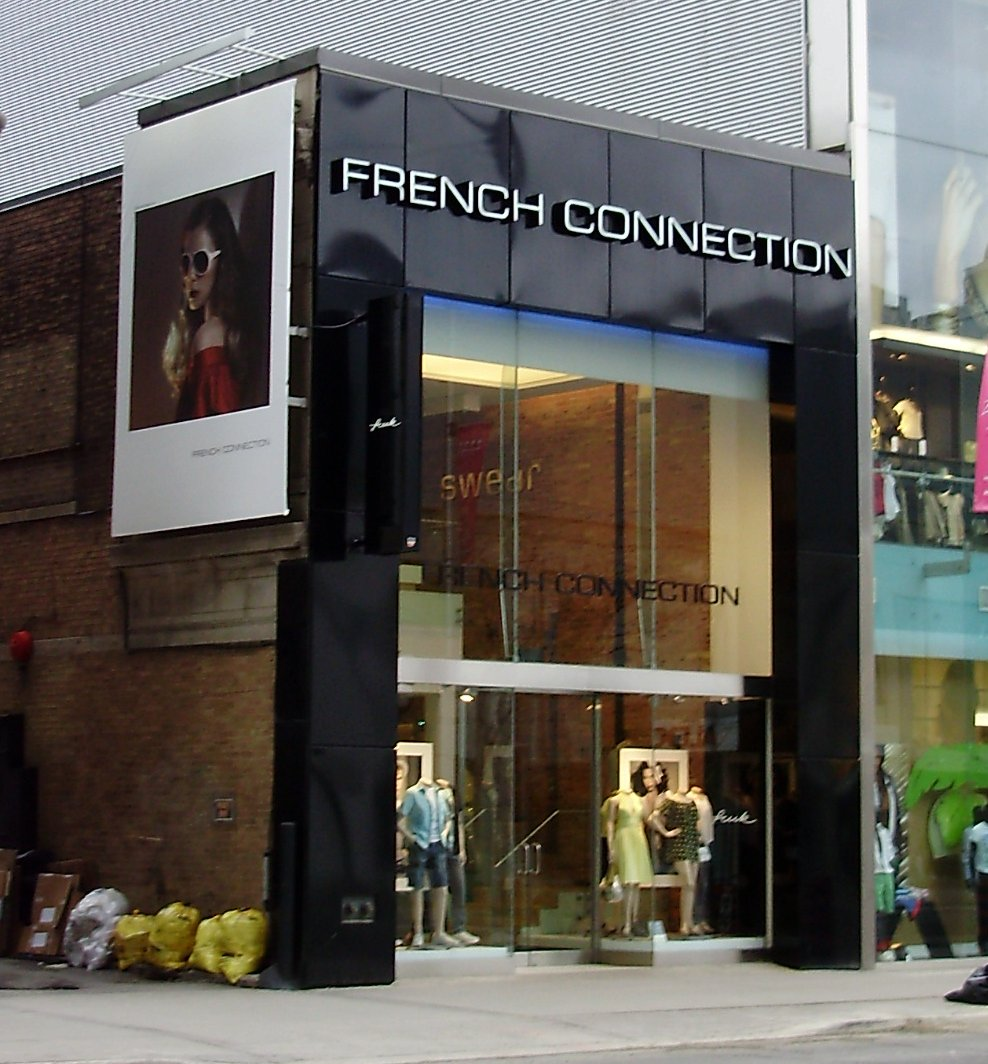
A French Connection store in Toronto, Ontario, Canada

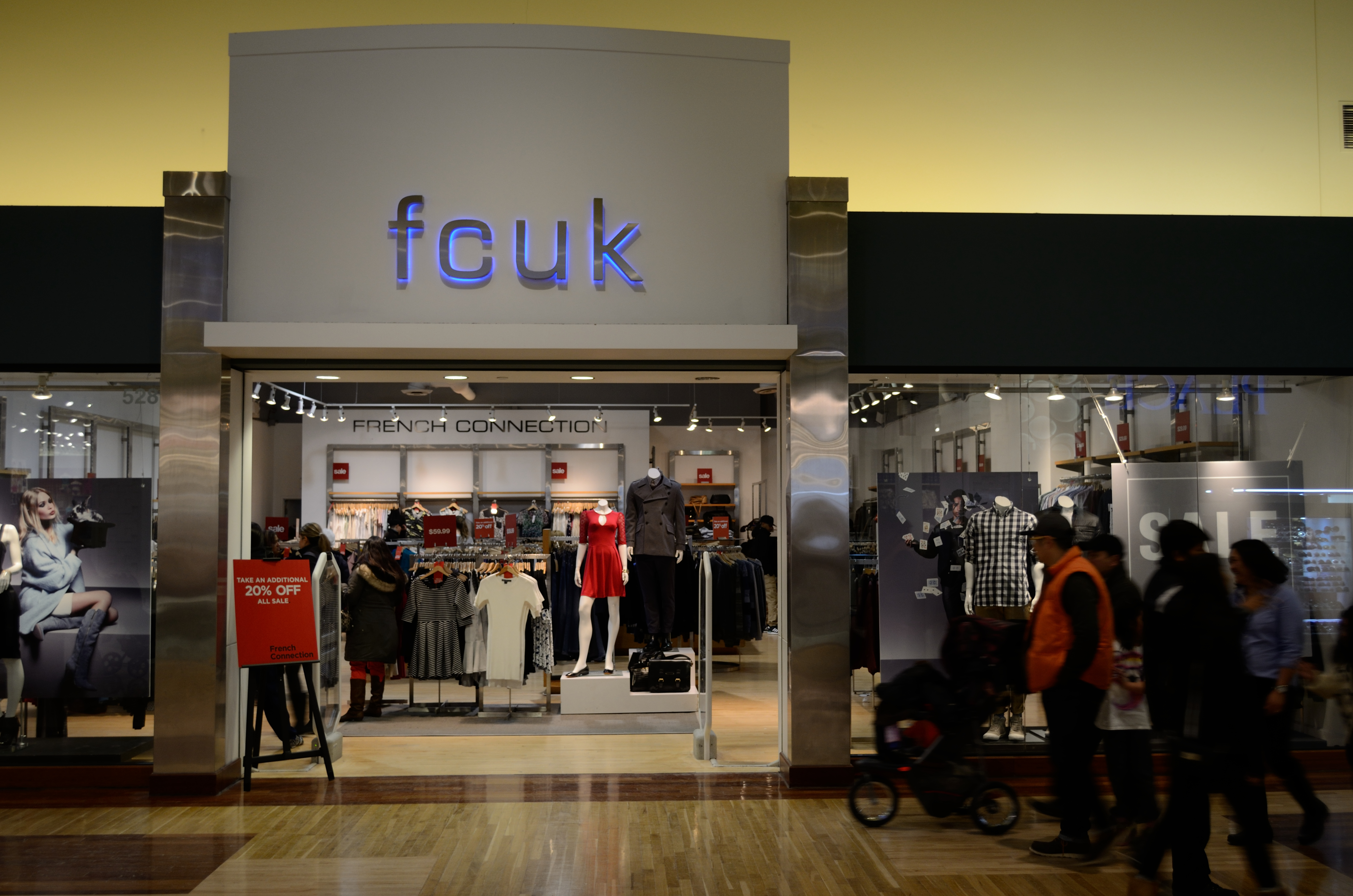
fcuk in Vaughan Mills Mall, Canada

French Connection stopped using the initialism in advertising in 2005, and reduced its profile in its shops. However it is still used on certain menswear products and in-store branding. Despite this lowering of the profile, French Connection remains known as "fcuk", particularly by the UK press. Example of use in UK press in 2013: "FCUK marketing says first black and white shoot for brand by photographer Rankin is in line with its 'edgy' image". In 2016, it was reported that French Connection was to bring back its FCUK slogan campaign.

=== Brand position ===
While the revival of the UK brand's fortunes in the 1990s has been attributed to the success of the FCUK logo, it has had mixed financial fortunes during the 2000s, reflected in its poor share prices in the UK. After reportedly losing market share to rivals such as Zara, Topshop, and ASOS — with some analysts suggesting its pricing was out of step with other competitor brands — its position improved in 2014, and, as of 2021, the French Connection brand had 67 stores in the UK and Europe.

== Worldwide operation ==
fcuk in Saigon Centre, Vietnam, its retailer here was BFF of Vingroup then ACFC of Imex Pan Pacific Group (IPPG)

French Connection distributes its branded womenswear and menswear through a network of owned stores, through franchised stores in major markets around the world, through concessions in department stores in the UK and also through other multi-brand retailers. French Connection also has a variety of licensed products, including eyeglasses, sunglasses, toiletries, shoes, jewellery and watches, which are sold through its own stores and specialist retailers, such as Boots and Specsavers.

=== Other brands in group ===
French Connection represents the majority of French Connection Group's revenue, accounting for 93% of it in 2025. Other homewear clothing brands include You Must Create (YMC) and Great Plains. Formerly, it also owned the Toast brand, which had nineteen stores in the UK in 2021 and was sold in 2018 to the Danish clothing company Bestseller for £23 million.

=== Perfumes ===
French Connection has produced perfumes as an extension to the main clothing brand, some of which are listed below.

- Eau de Fcuk Nos. 1, 2, and 3 — Men's range introduced 2000 and women's perfumes in 2001.
- Fcuk Her and Fcuk Him (2003) — Original women's perfume by Zirh/Shiseido and men's perfume by James Krivda.
- Fcuk Connect Her and Fcuk Connect Him (2007) — Men's and women's ranges with base notes, including musk.
- Fcuk Friction Her and Fcuk Friction Him (2012) — Women's perfume includes notes of coconut and vanilla; men's includes citrus.
- Fcuk You (2013) — Men's range with top notes of neroli and base notes of lemon.
