= Nower Hill High School =

Coordinates: 51°35′29″N 0°21′55″W

Location
- George V Avenue; Pinner, Middlesex, HA5 5RP; England

Information
- Type: Academy
- Motto: Service not self
- Established: 8 April 1929; 97 years ago
- Department for Education URN: 137028 Tables
- Ofsted: Reports
- Chair of Governors: M. Weerasekera
- Headteacher: J. Skelhorne
- Gender: Mixed
- Age: 11 to 18
- Colour: Navy Blue
- Publication: Nower Hill News (every term)
- Badges: 3 small scimitars and a sword
- Website: www.nowerhill.org.uk

Nower Hill High School is a secondary academy school with a sixth form, in Pinner in the London Borough of Harrow. The school currently has 324 students in each year group including over 400 in the Sixth form, making over 2000 students in the school. Students range from 11–18 years of age; the sixth form is part of the borough's Harrow Sixth Form Collegiate.

== History ==
The school, then known as Headstone Council School, started life in 1929 when the red brick building on Pinner Road was built. Its "houses", commemorating famous former residents of Harrow and one historical building, were Byron, Becket, Shaftesbury and Manor. Colours, in the order of the houses given, were Green, Blue, Red and Orange.

The name of the school changed to Nower Hill High School on 1 September 1974.

The music block and sports hall is named the Gristwood Centre after Mr F.R.H Gristwood for his service to the school. The block containing Maths classrooms and facilities for the 6th Form (completed in 2009) is named after former headteacher Howard Freed.

In 2006, sixth form students were admitted for the first time. In 2011 the school changed to academy status. In 2015, new school houses were introduced, named after significant people chosen by the students themselves. The houses are now Bannister (orange), Nightingale (blue), Franklin (green), King (red), Shabazz (purple), and Gandhi (yellow).
