= Park High School, Stanmore =

Park High School

Location
- Thistlecroft Gardens; Stanmore, London, HA7 1PL; England; 51.59947°N 0.30279°W

Information
- Type: Academy
- Department for Education URN: 137075 Tables
- Ofsted: Reports
- Headteacher: Mr Neil Darby
- Gender: Coeducational
- Age: 11 to 18
- Website: www.parkhighstanmore.org.uk

Park High School is a coeducational 11–18 Academy in Stanmore, London, England. It is located next to Centenary Park.

The school converted to academy status in 2011, having previously been a community school under the direct control of Harrow London Borough Council. The school continues to coordinate with Harrow London Borough Council for admissions. The sixth form is part of the Harrow Sixth Form Collegiate.

Park High School offers GCSEs, OCR Nationals and A Levels as programmes of study for pupils.

== History ==
Park High School opened 29 August 1939, originally as two schools: Chandos Girls School and Chandos Boys School. Both Schools closed shortly afterwards, following Neville Chamberlain's declaration of 3 September 1939 that all schools should be closed until further notice, but by 23 October 1939 the school was operational once more, but student numbers were initially limited until adequate protection could be provided.

Chandos Girls School and Chandos Boys School continued to coincide and provide education until 1976 when they were amalgamated and became Park High School.

In 2008 Park High School received its first sixth formers, and in 2010 it had its first cohort of year 7 students, as Harrow joined other boroughs nationally in removing middle schools from the system.

In June 2011 Park High converted to an Academy status.
