= London Borough of Harrow =

- London borough
- Coat of arms Council Logo
- Motto(s): Salus populi suprema lex (The well-being of the people is the highest law)
- Harrow shown within Greater London
- Coordinates: 51°34′N 0°20′W
- Sovereign state: United Kingdom
- Constituent country: England
- Region: London
- Ceremonial county: Greater London
- Created: 1 April 1965
- Admin HQ: Civic Centre; Station Road; Harrow

Government
  - Type: London borough council
  - Body: Harrow London Borough Council
  - London Assembly: Krupesh Hirani AM for Brent and Harrow
  - MPs: Gareth Thomas; Bob Blackman; David Simmonds
  - Council leader: Cllr Paul Osborn (Conservative)

Area
  - Total: 19.49 sq mi (50.47 km^{2})
  - Rank: 243rd (of 296)

Population (2025)
  - Total: 272,612
  - Rank: 68th (of 296)
  - Density: 13,990/sq mi (5,401/km^{2})
- Time zone: UTC (GMT)
  - Summer (DST): UTC+1 (BST)
- Postcodes: HA, NW, UB
- Area code: 020
- ISO 3166 code: GB-HRW
- ONS code: 00AQ
- GSS code: E09000015
- Police: Metropolitan Police
- Website: http://www.harrow.gov.uk/

The London Borough of Harrow (/ˈhæroʊ/) is a borough in west and north-west London, England; it forms part of Outer London. It borders four other London boroughs – Barnet to the east of ancient Watling Street (now the A5 road), Brent to the southeast, Ealing to the south and Hillingdon to the west and the Hertfordshire districts of Three Rivers and Hertsmere to the north. The local authority is Harrow London Borough Council. The London borough was formed in 1965, based on boundaries that had been established in 1934. The borough is made up of three towns: Harrow, Pinner and Stanmore, but also includes western parts of Edgware and Sudbury.

== History ==
The area of the modern borough broadly corresponds to the three ancient parishes of Harrow on the Hill, Great Stanmore and Little Stanmore (also known as Whitchurch), all of which were historically in the county of Middlesex. Harrow on the Hill was the largest of the three parishes. Pinner was a chapelry of Harrow on the Hill until 1766 when it was made a separate parish.

The central part of the parish of Harrow on the Hill was made a local board district in 1850, with an elected board overseeing public health and responsible for the provision of infrastructure. The local board district covered the original hilltop village and the adjoining hamlets of Roxeth, Sudbury and Greenhill. Greenhill subsequently developed into the modern town centre of Harrow following the opening of Harrow-on-the-Hill station there in 1880.

Such districts were reconstituted as urban districts under the Local Government Act 1894, which also said that parishes could no longer straddle district boundaries. The parts of the old parish of Harrow on the Hill outside the urban district were therefore split into three new parishes called Harrow Weald, Wealdstone and Wembley (the latter now part of the London Borough of Brent). Wealdstone and Wembley were both made into urban districts at the same time.

Harrow within Middlesex in 1961

The urban district was significantly enlarged by the Middlesex Review Order 1934 to take in the neighbouring urban district of Wealdstone and the parishes of Harrow Weald, Pinner, Great Stanmore and Little Stanmore. The urban district was renamed from 'Harrow on the Hill' to just 'Harrow' as part of the 1934 expansion. Harrow Urban District was incorporated as a municipal borough on 4 May 1954. At the 1961 census, the borough had a population of 209,080, making it the most populous local government district in the administrative county of Middlesex.

In 1965 the borough was transferred from Middlesex to Greater London under the London Government Act 1963. It kept the same boundaries, but was renamed the London Borough of Harrow, becoming one of the 32 London Boroughs. It was the only London borough which comprised a single pre-1965 district with no changes to its boundaries. There has since been an adjustment to the borough's northern boundary, where the village of Elstree straddled Harrow and Hertfordshire; on 1 April 1993 Elstree was placed entirely in Hertfordshire (and its district of Hertsmere).

== Governance ==
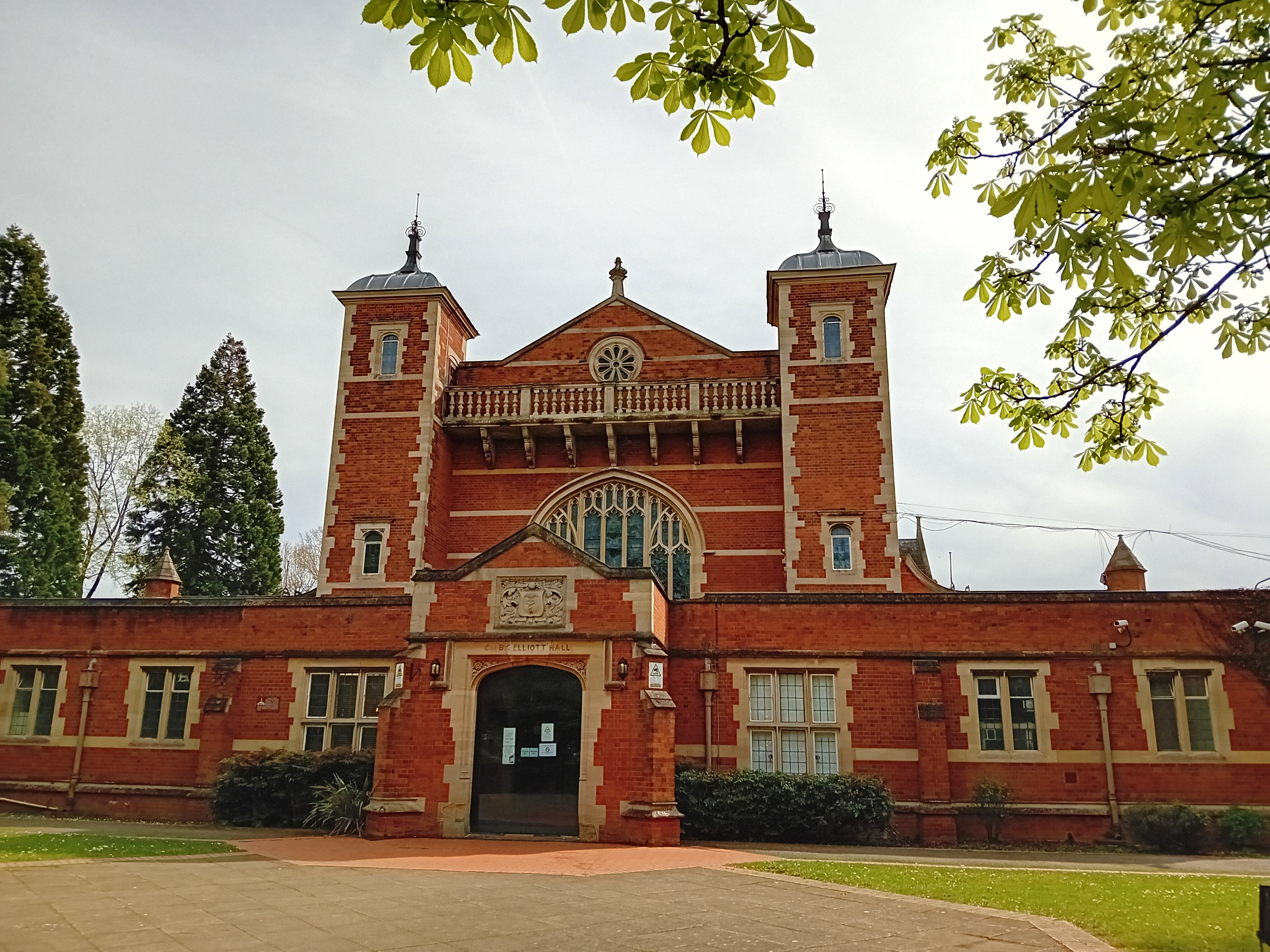
Elliott Hall, Harrow Arts Centre, Pinner

The local authority is Harrow Council, which meets at the Harrow Arts Centre in Pinner and has its main offices at the Council Hub on Kenmore Avenue in Wealdstone.

=== Greater London representation ===
Since 2000, for elections to the London Assembly, the borough forms part of the Brent and Harrow constituency.

== Demographics ==
Population pyramid Harrow in 2021

=== Economy, local amenity, housing and development ===
Fast access points to central London (Note: Fastest services of 20 minutes to Marylebone and 12 minutes to Euston and several Tube stations) provide a competitive Central London-workplace housing draw by being close to the main rail/tube stations to working-age adults. The vast bulk of Harrow's neighbourhoods, some verging on the Metropolitan Green Belt combine with their generally fast links to the employers and amenity of Central London with other complimentary and overlapping selling points to first-time residents and those moving on from their childhood home. Parks, avenues, substantive gardens, (Note: A Land Use Survey by the Office for National Statistics in 2005 found, within England, that this borough/district then had the second-highest proportion of land as domestic gardens: 34.7% of all 326 districts; this compared with the Sutton's's 35.1% (highest proportion nationally) and Bournemouth's 34.6%.) the northern fringe and Harrow-on-the-Hill's elevated views of London and the quality and condition of most homes are evident in modern maps of the borough and home-price 'heat maps'. The few post-war social housing estates are mostly in good condition with no run-down tower blocks but the retail/services centre of most districts has shophouses in variable external condition, residentially. The tallest apartment block is to a high specification, in a green setting, at 134 metres tall (318 flats, a library, public square and a few new retail units).

Public-transport, automotive-sector, education-sector and restaurantation/leisure jobs are as across most of England significant employers/self-employed sectors locally. Kodak, the Royal National Orthopaedic Hospital and Ladbrokes headquartered here are notable single employers. Rising London property prices have prompted from about 1980 ongoing gradual addition of mid-rise (re-)developments of the local mainly Edwardian to 1940s housing stock. Harrow-on-the-Hill, Harrow Weald and Stanmore have the bulk of the surviving pre-1880s minority of homes (cottages and tall-storeyed townhouses) almost all clustered into 17 of Harrow's conservation areas, fewer than in Richmond-upon-Thames and the London Borough of Bromley but an overall number of 24 which indicates alongside images and studies of these three oldest parts of 'Harrow' exceptional architectural merit can be found for a minority of homes, including some recent housing. As at November 2026, 1,023 homes were Homes/Houses in Multiple Occupation which is modest for London; as at the 2021 census this borough accounted for approximately 89,600 households.

=== Ethnicity ===
Ethnic makeup of Harrow by single year ages in 2021

Harrow is a diverse borough, having 63.8% of its population from the BME (Black and Minority Ethnic) communities, with the largest group being of Indian ethnicity (specifically those from Gujarat and South India). The borough can also claim to have the largest concentration of Sri Lankan Tamils in the UK and Ireland as well as having the highest density of Gujarati Hindus in the UK. A beneficiary of immigration, Harrow in the 2020s, has (narrowly) for the first time more residents than Southampton.

Ethnic Group	Year											
Ethnic Group	1971 estimations		1981 estimations		1991 census		2001 census		2011 census		2021 census	
Ethnic Group	Number	%	Number	%	Number	%	Number	%	Number	%	Number	%
White: Total	–	95.8%	164,781	85%	149,689	73.4%	121,543	58.77%	100,991	42.07%	95,233	36.46%
White: British	–	–	–	–	–	–	103,207	49.90%	73,826	30.8%	53,567	20.51%
White: Irish	–	–	–	–	–	–	9,057	4.38%	7,336	3.0%	5,608	2.15%
White: Gypsy or Irish Traveller	–	–	–	–	–	–	–	–	181	0.07%	179	0.07%
White: Other	–	–	–	–	–	–	9,279	4.49%	19,648	8.2%	34,458	13.19%
Asian or Asian British: Total	–	–	22,223	11.4%	42,732	21%	61,314	29.65%	101,808	42.2%	118,152	45.23%
Asian or Asian British: Indian	–	–	17,515	9%	33,246	16.3%	45,310	21.91%	63,051	26.3%	74,744	28.62%
Asian or Asian British: Pakistani	–	–	1,395		2,406		4,317	2.09%	7,797	3.2%	10,264	3.93%
Asian or Asian British: Bangladeshi	–	–	290		552		953	0.46%	1,378	0.5%	1,820	0.70%
Asian or Asian British: Chinese	–	–	1,003		1,854		2,567	1.24%	2,629	1.0%	2,784	1.07%
Asian or Asian British: Other Asian	–	–	2,020		4,674		10,734	5.19%	26,953	11.2%	28,540	10.93%
Black or Black British: Total	–	–	4,724	2.4%	7,664	3.8%	12,703	6.14%	19,708	8.1%	19,151	7.33%
Black or Black British: African	–	–	941		1,731		5,656	2.73%	8,526	3.5%	10,584	4.05%
Black or Black British: Caribbean	–	–	2,857	1.5%	4,537	2.2%	6,116	2.96%	6,812	2.8%	6,514	2.49%
Black or Black British: Other Black	–	–	926		1,396		931	0.45%	4,370	1.8%	2053	0.79%
Mixed or British Mixed: Total	–	–	–	–	–	–	5,840	2.82%	9,499	3.8%	9,833	3.76%
Mixed: White and Black Caribbean	–	–	–	–	–	–	1,371	0.66%	2,344	0.9%	2,187	0.84%
Mixed: White and Black African	–	–	–	–	–	–	633	0.31%	1,053	0.4%	1,104	0.42%
Mixed: White and Asian	–	–	–	–	–	–	2,018	0.98%	3,417	1.4%	3,140	1.20%
Mixed: Other Mixed	–	–	–	–	–	–	1,818	0.88%	2,685	1.1%	3,402	1.30%
Other: Total	–	–	2,208	1.1%	3,714	1.8%	2,847	1.38%	7,050	2.8%	18,836	7.21%
Other: Arab	–	–	–	–	–	–	–	–	3,708	1.5%	6,239	2.39%
Other: Any other ethnic group	–	–	–	–	–	–	2,847	1.38%	3,342	1.3%	12,597	4.82%
Ethnic minority: Total	–	4.8%	29,155	15%	54,110	26.6%	85,271	41.23%	138,065	57.93%	165,972	63.54%
Total	–	100%	193,936	100%	203,799	100%	206,814	100.00%	239,056	100.00%	261,205	100.00%

Population
Year	Pop.	±%
1801	3,240	—
1811	3,969	+22.5%
1821	4,383	+10.4%
1831	5,342	+21.9%
1841	5,829	+9.1%
1851	5,980	+2.6%
1861	7,424	+24.1%
1871	8,869	+19.5%
1881	10,313	+16.3%
1891	12,231	+18.6%
1901	22,683	+85.5%
1911	42,065	+85.4%
1921	64,431	+53.2%
1931	98,694	+53.2%
1941	146,617	+48.6%
1951	217,811	+48.6%
1961	210,424	−3.4%
1971	203,309	−3.4%
1981	196,147	−3.5%
1991	203,769	+3.9%
2001	207,389	+1.8%
2011	239,056	+15.3%
2021	261,205	+9.3%
2024 estimate	270,724	+3.6%
Sources: A Vision of Britain through time, citing Census population, 2021, 2024 estimate

Since 2005, on the last Sunday in June Harrow Council hosts Under One Sky - Harrow's largest festival, to celebrate and the joint communities of Harrow. This has a programme of dance, world music, sports activity, youth music, spoken word, free children's activity, a carnival parade, information and stalls, health promotion, a world food zone and outside radio broadcast.

=== Religion ===
Faith in Harrow (2021)
1. Christian (33.9%)
2. Hindu (25.8%)
3. Muslim (15.9%)
4. No Religion (10.6%)
5. Jewish (2.80%)
6. Jain (2.40%)
7. Buddhist (1.10%)
8. Sikh (1.10%)
9. Other Religions (0.50%)
10. Religion not Stated (5.90%)

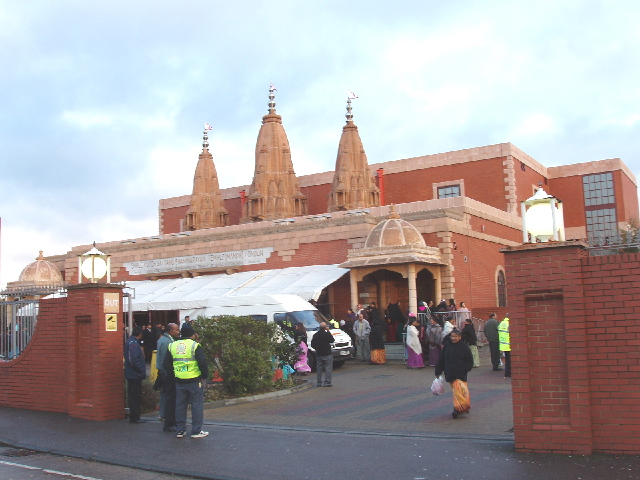
Shri Swaminarayan Mandir, London (Harrow)

Harrow is the most religiously diverse local authority area in the UK, with a 62% chance that two random people are from different religions, according to Office for National Statistics, October 2006. According to the 2011 census, 25.3% of Harrow's population identified themselves as Hindu - the highest in the UK. A large number of Jewish people live in Stanmore and Hatch End. The Stanmore and Canons Park Synagogue, until 2019, boasted the largest membership of any single synagogue in the whole of Europe. Harrow also has a sizable Muslim community, about 1 in 10 of its population.

As per the 2011 census, Harrow has a larger than average Jewish, Hindu and Muslim population.

Religion	2021 census
Religion	% of residents
Christianity	33.9
Hinduism	25.8
Islam	15.9
Judaism	2.8
Jainism	2.4
Buddhism	1.1
Sikhism	1.1
No religion	10.6
Religion not stated	5.9

=== Immigration ===
This list includes top-15 sources of immigration to Borough of Harrow for 2021 census:

#	Country	Number
1	India	26,376
2	Romania	21,082
3	Kenya	10,859
4	Sri Lanka	10,706
5	Afghanistan	4,825
6	Pakistan	4,485
7	Uganda	3,857
8	Poland	3,602
9	Ireland	3,245
10	Tanzania	2,560
11	Somalia	2,455
12	Nepal	1,580
13	Iraq	1,506
14	Jamaica	1,505
15	Italy	1,453

== Arts and culture ==
The first and only contemporary artist-led gallery in Harrow was set up in 2010 by the Usurp Art Collective. The space is called the Usurp Art Gallery & Studios and is based in West Harrow, a bohemian part of Harrow. Usurp Art provides professional support to artists and runs the only public artists studios in the borough. It is a flagship project for Arts Council England.

There are 289 listed buildings located in the London Borough of Harrow, including more than 80 in Harrow-on-the-Hill ward and over 50 in Pinner ward. Grade I and II* buildings in the borough include the Church of St Lawrence, Stanmore and Headstone Manor, and Grade II listed buildings include Bentley Priory, Grim's Dyke and Harrow and Wealdstone station.

== Crime ==
Crime figures are generally lower compared to the Greater London average; the borough had 2,618 notifiable offences in April 2009, compared with an average of 2,204 across London's boroughs. Between the annual year of June 2017 to June 2018, Harrow was ranked 28th out of the 32 London boroughs in terms of number of criminal offences, and recording just one murder in the period. The Pinner South ward was recorded as having the lowest crime rate out of all wards of Greater London in 2014/15.

== Sport and leisure ==
The London Borough of Harrow has 4 non league football clubs, including Wealdstone FC who play at The Vale, Harrow Borough F.C. who play at Rogers Family Stadium and Rayners Lane F.C. who play at the Tithe Farm Social Club. Barnet F.C. are also based in Harrow, having moved into The Hive Stadium from the neighbouring London Borough of Barnet in 2013 after disagreements with the local authority over their former home Underhill Stadium. Five of the 30 cricket clubs which play in the Middlesex County Cricket League are based in the London Borough of Harrow: Harrow, Harrow St Mary's, Harrow Town, Kenton and Stanmore. Hatch End Cricket Club previously played at Shaftesbury playing fields in Hatch End but following an arson attack on their clubhouse and a subsequent failure to raise enough funds to build a new one, the club moved to Elstree in 2011.

Harrow also had a professional rugby league team when London Broncos played at The Hive Stadium in 2014 and 2015. The club relocated to Ealing from 2016 onwards.

== Education ==
The borough is often perceived as having a good educational record, and features many state-funded primary and secondary schools as well as a handful of large tertiary colleges.

For a long time the secondary schools of Harrow did not feature integrated sixth form education, with all school leavers having to join the tertiary colleges such as Harrow College and Stanmore College, or the faith-based St Dominic's Sixth Form College. The tertiary system was implemented in 1987 after years of discussions and delays, with Harrow becoming the first London borough with a complete change to tertiary; the Pinner Observer called it an education "revolution". There have been critics of the tertiary colleges, with many arguing the standard of education does not continue the standard set by the Borough's secondary schools. The council eventually went into another re-organisation, creating the Harrow Sixth Form Collegiate, a co-ordinated partnership between many of the borough's secondary schools, which led to the first admission of school sixth form students in September 2008. Both Catholic faith-based Salvatorian College and Sacred Heart Language College were unaffected, the students of which could transfer to St Dominic's Sixth Form College.

From September 2010, the primary sector was modified to enable transfer to secondary education at age 11 in line with other London Boroughs.

The Borough has a Music Service which provides instrumental tuition for 15% of all Harrow state sector pupils (the national figure is 8% of all state pupils receiving instrumental tuition) and a range of ensemble opportunities for pupils.

The independent schools of the Borough are dominated by the presence of Harrow School and John Lyon School for boys and North London Collegiate School for girls which consistently rank as among the best schools in the country. Notable independent primary schools include Orley Farm School and Reddiford School, both of which are co-educational.

There are also a number of voluntary aided schools in the Borough. These include: Salvatorian College (Roman Catholic, boys) and Sacred Heart Language College (Roman Catholic, girls).

There are two special needs high schools; Kingsley High School (co-ed) and Shaftesbury High School (co-ed).

Other state secondary schools in the London Borough of Harrow are: Whitefriars High School (co-ed); Bentley Wood High School (girls); Canons High School (co-ed); Harrow High School (co-ed); Hatch End High School (co-ed); Nower Hill High School (co-ed); Park High School (co-ed); Rooks Heath School (co-ed); Whitmore High School (co-ed). Mountview High School in Wealdstone - a comprehensive school formed out of Whitefriars Secondary Modern in the early 1970s - closed in 1986 with the site being partially redeveloped into industrial units. The catchment area was dispersed between Nower Hill and Hatch End Schools.

Middle schools include Whitchurch Middle School.

GCSE examination performance

School	A*-C Pass Rate 2008	A*-C Pass Rate 2009	A*-C Pass Rate 2010	English Baccalaureate Pass Rate 2010	A*-C Pass Rate 2011	English Baccalaureate Pass Rate 2011
Bentley Wood High School	59%	58%	61%	30%	69%	36%
Canons High School	49%	46%	54%	2%	52%	12%
Harrow High School	52%	43%	31%	5%	35%	3%
Hatch End High School	51%	59%	55%	24%	49%	20%
Nower Hill High School	68%	57%	79%	27%	78%	16%
Park High School	66%	72%	66%	15%	71%	23%
Rooks Heath School	37%	42%	52%	11%	48%	12%
Sacred Heart College	76%	86%	77%	53%	84%	59%
Salvatorian College	67%	67%	74%	27%	73%	26%
Whitmore High School	65%	64%	60%	35%	70%	40%
Average for London Borough of Harrow	57.7%	60.8%	60.7%	22.6%	tba	tba
Average for England	47.6%	50.7%	55.2%	15.1%	tba	tba

- The table on shows the percentage of students gaining five A* to C grades, including English and Maths, for state schools in the London Borough of Harrow.
- The rightmost column shows the percentage of students gaining five A* to C grades, in five core subjects - maths, English, two science qualifications, a foreign language and either history or geography.
- Source: Department for Education

All of Harrow's pupils have the chance to be elected onto the Harrow Youth Parliament. This is a group of around 50 young people in the Borough who come together to work on projects that benefit other young people. They are also the official youth voice for the council and are in constant communication with the council on all youth matters.

== Districts and postcodes ==
The overwhelming majority of Harrow is in the eponymous HA postcode area, but some of the western part of Harrow is in the UB area and some of the eastern part is in the NW area.

== Transport ==
The London Borough of Harrow was historically in the heart of an area known as "Metro-land" and therefore is very well served by the London Underground compared with other boroughs in Outer London. It is located near the northwestern extremity of the modern-day network, with 4 lines serving the area. The Bakerloo and Jubilee lines terminate in the borough, at Harrow and Stanmore respectively. Meanwhile, the Piccadilly and Metropolitan lines pass through the southern edge of the borough on shared track before both terminating at Uxbridge. The Northern line terminates just outside Harrow at Edgware tube station in the London Borough of Barnet.

The London Overground also serves the borough, sharing track with the Bakerloo line between Queens Park and Harrow & Wealdstone before it continues beyond the latter station to eventually terminate at Watford Junction.

The numerous National Rail, London Overground and London Underground stations in the borough are:

- Canons Park
- Harrow & Wealdstone
- Harrow-on-the-Hill
- Hatch End
- Headstone Lane
- North Harrow
- Pinner
- Rayners Lane
- South Harrow
- Stanmore
- Sudbury Hill
- Sudbury Hill Harrow
- West Harrow

In March 2011, the main forms of transport that residents used to travel to work were: driving a car or van, 27.5% of all residents aged 16–74; underground, metro, light rail, tram, 5.9%; bus, minibus or coach, 5.9%; train, 4.5%; on foot, 4.3%; work mainly at or from home, 3.5%; passenger in a car or van, 1.6%.

== Town twinning ==
Harrow is twinned with:

- Douai, France

== Coat of arms ==
A coat of arms was granted to Harrow Urban District Council in 1938. Supporters to the arms were granted in 1954, when the urban district was incorporated as a municipal borough. The municipal borough became the London Borough of Harrow in 1965, with unaltered boundaries, and thus the council retained use of the arms. The arms are also used by Harrow Borough F.C. The motto reads as "Salus Populi Suprema Lex" which translates from Latin as "The well-being of the people is the highest law."

== Freedom of the Borough ==
The following people and organisations have received the Freedom of the Borough of Harrow.

=== Individuals ===
- Sir Winston Churchill: 30 December 1955.
- Sir Roger Bannister: May 2004.
- Keith Toms: 26 November 2020.

=== Military units ===
- 131 Independent Commando Squadron, Corps of Royal Engineers (Volunteers): 10 March 1983.
- 47 (Middlesex Yeomanry) Signal Squadron, 31st (Greater London) Signal Regiment Royal Corps of Signals: 10 March 1983.
- 257 (Southern) General Hospital Royal Army Medical Corps (Volunteers): 10 March 1983.
- RAF Stanmore Park: 20 October 1988.
- RAF Bentley Priory: 20 October 1988.
- Roxeth & Harrow Company, Church Lads' & Church Girls' Brigade: 20 October 1994
- Royal British Legion (Harrow Branch): 18 July 1996.
- Girls' Brigade North West London District: 1 May 2014.
- 1454 (Harrow) Squadron Air Training Corps: 1 May 2014.

== See also ==
- Harrow parks and open spaces

== Notes and References ==
Notes
