= Street light interference phenomenon =

Alleged anomalous phenomenon

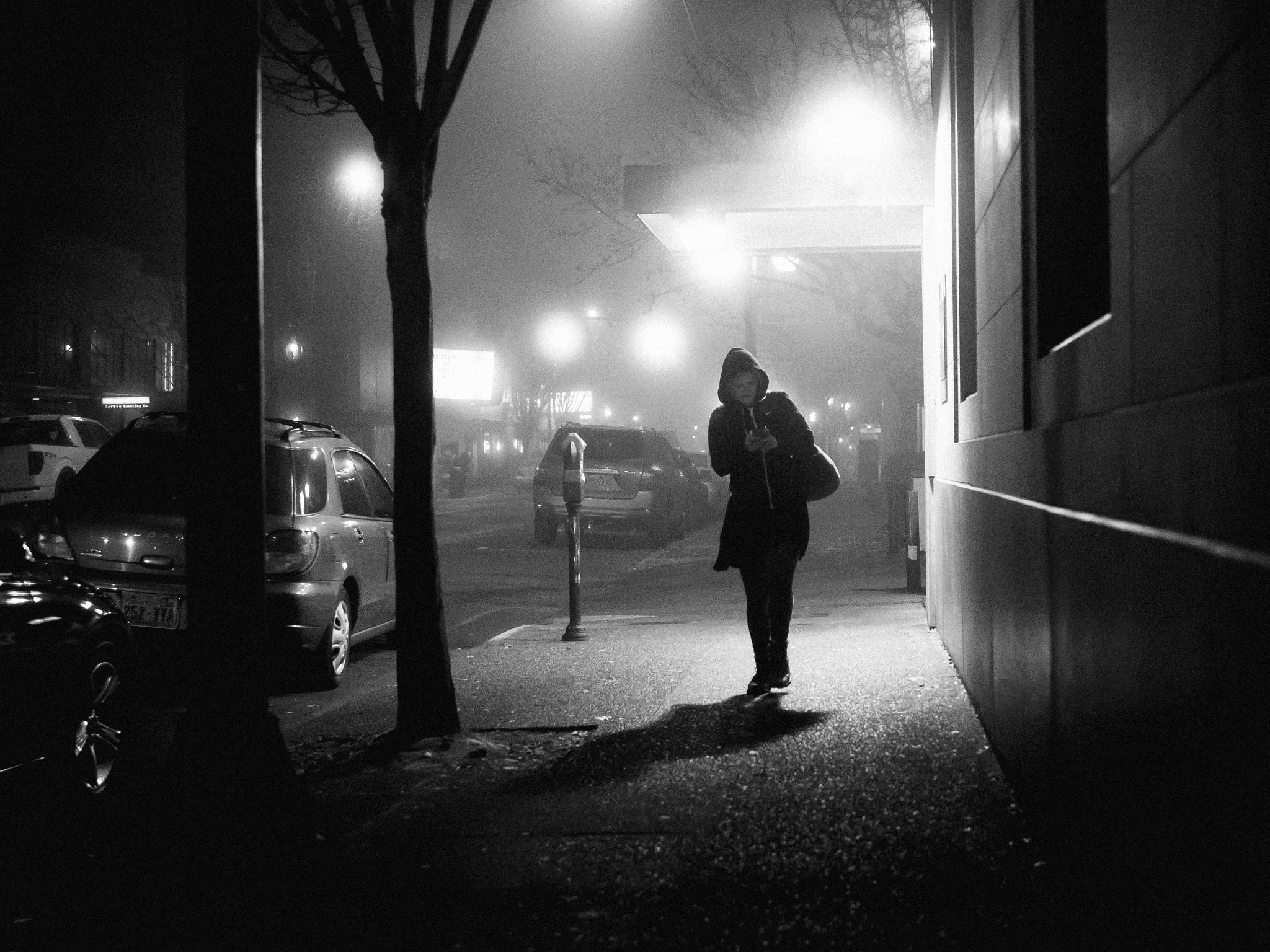
A person walking under streetlights

Street light interference, sometimes called high voltage syndrome, is the claimed ability of individuals to turn street lights on or off when passing near them. Believers in street light interference (SLI) allege that they experience it on a regular basis with specific lamps and street lights and more frequently than chance would explain; however, SLI has never been demonstrated to occur in a scientific experiment, and those who claim the ability have been found to be unable to reproduce the effect on demand. The term street light interference was coined by proponent of paranormal phenomena, author Hilary Evans.

== Proponents ==
According to Evans, SLI is a phenomenon "based on claims by many people that they involuntarily, and usually spontaneously, cause street lamps to go out." Evans' 1993 book The SLI Effect proposes that the phenomenon is "not consistent with our current knowledge of how people interact with the physical world." Evans coined the term "SLIder" to refer to someone who allegedly causes this effect, and cites SLIders' claims of being able to "extinguish a row of sodium vapor lamps in sequence, each one going out as the witnesses nears it."

Some proponents believe static electricity or "some kind of 'energy' emitted by the human body" is responsible for SLI. Others claim the alleged phenomenon is caused by individuals having psychic or psychokinetic ability.

== Reception ==
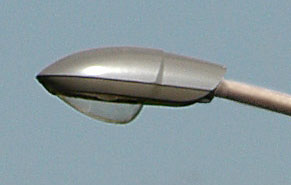
A high pressure sodium street light fixture

Author Massimo Polidoro writing in Skeptical Inquirer has considered claims of SLI to be examples of correlation not implying causation, or of confirmation bias: people are much more likely to notice when a nearby street light turns on or off than they are to notice a light turning on or off at a distance, or a street light in a steady state at any distance. This is compounded by a failure mode of street lights, known as "cycling", in which street lights of the high pressure sodium type turn off and on more frequently at the end of their life cycle. A high pressure sodium engineer at General Electric, quoted by Cecil Adams, summarizes SLI as "a combination of coincidence and wishful thinking". Polidoro notes that a "[p]aranormal phenomenon is the least likely possibility."

== See also ==
- Association for the Scientific Study of Anomalous Phenomena
- Deluminator, a fictional Harry Potter device.
- Intelligent street lighting
- Pauli effect – Superstition that equipment only fails in the presence of certain people
