= List of people from the London Borough of Lewisham =

This is a list of people who were born or have lived in the London Borough of Lewisham and of those who were born or have lived in Blackheath (including the part of Blackheath in the London Borough of Greenwich).

== Notable people from Lewisham ==
Among those who were born in the London Borough of Lewisham, or have dwelt within the borders of the borough are:

- Danny Baker (broadcaster) lived in Deptford
- Rosa May Billinghurst (suffragette) lived in Lewisham
- Dominic Cooper (actor) lived in Lewisham
- James Callaghan (politician) lived in Blackheath
- Sir James Clark Ross (explorer) lived in Blackheath
- Danielle Harold (actress best known for playing Lola in Eastenders) Born and raised in Lewisham
- Maxwell Confait, Colin Lattimore, Ronal Leighton and Ahmet Salih lived in Catford
- Jim Connell (socialist) lived in Crofton Park and Honor Oak
- Jean Cooke (artist) born in Blackheath
- Henry Cooper (heavyweight boxing champion) grew up on the Bellingham estate
- Horatio Henry Couldery (1832–1893) (animal artist) noted for his paintings of cats, kittens and dogs, was born in Lewisham
- William Clark Cowie (1849–1910), Borneo administrator lived in Blackheath Park, Blackheath.
- Ernest Dowson (poet) lived in Catford and Lee
- Nick Ferrari LBC 97.3 radio presenter
- W. G. Grace (cricketer) lived in Sydenham
- Edmond Halley (astronomer royal, Greenwich observatory) lived in Lee and is buried here at St. Margaret church.
- Malcolm Hardee (comedian) lived in Blackheath and Lewisham
- Frank Harper (actor) grew up in the borough and attended Malory School in Downham
- George Julian Harney (chartist) lived in Deptford
- Will Hay (comedy actor) lived in Crofton Park
- Sir Isaac Hayward (politician) lived in Deptford
- Keeley Hazell (Page 3 girl) born in Lewisham
- Frederick John Horniman (collector) lived in Forest Hill
- Leslie Howard (actor) lived in Forest Hill
- Glenda Jackson (politician) lived in Blackheath
- David Jones (poet)
- James Robertson Justice, Actor, born in Baring Road, Lee in 1907
- Elsa Lanchester (Anglo-American actress) born in Lewisham, lived in Catford
- Jude Law (actor) lived in Lewisham
- Laurence Llewelyn-Bowen (designer) lived in Blackheath
- Marie Lloyd (entertainer) lived in Lewisham and New Cross
- Eleanor Marx (politician) lived in Sydenham
- Alexander McQueen (fashion designer) was born in Lewisham
- Spike Milligan (comedian) lived in Catford, Crofton Park and Honor Oak
- Laila Morse (actress and sister of Gary Oldman) lives in New Cross
- Edith Nesbit (writer) lived in Blackheath, Grove Park and Lewisham
- Gary Oldman (actor) was born in New Cross and grew up in Deptford
- Gladys Powers (centenarian) was born in Lewisham
- Russian Tsar Peter the Great lived in Deptford
- Louise Redknapp (TV presenter and former wife of footballer Jamie Redknapp) was born in Lewisham
- Ignatius Sancho (writer and campaigner) lived in Blackheath
- Dame Cicely Saunders (founder of hospice movement) lived in Sydenham
- Sir Ernest Shackleton (Antarctic explorer) lived in Sydenham
- Timothy Spall (actor) lives in Honor Oak
- Jason Statham (actor) lives in Forest Hill
- Doris Stokes (medium) lived in Lewisham
- E. W. Swanton (writer) lived in Forest Hill
- Archbishop Desmond Tutu lived on Brownhill Road Catford
- Terry Waite (humanitarian) lived in Blackheath
- Max Wall (comedian) lived in Lee
- Barnes Wallis (engineer) lived in New Cross
- Ian Wright (footballer) lived in Lewisham
- Shaun Wright-Phillips (footballer and son of Ian Wright) grew up in Brockley

=== Musicians ===
- Alex James (bass guitarist of Blur) went to university in New Cross, Goldsmiths.
- Bill Wyman (musician) lived in Sydenham
- Charlene Soraia (musician) was brought up in Sydenham
- D-Block Europe (British rap collective) from Lewisham
- Daniel Bedingfield (singer/songwriter) brought up in Lewisham
- David Sylvian (musician) lived in Lewisham
- DigDat (rapper) born in Lewisham
- Gabrielle (musician) lived in Brockley and Honor Oak
- Ginger Baker (drummer of Cream) born and brought up in Lewisham
- Jimi Hendrix (American rock legend) lived in Hither Green in late 1966
- Kate Bush (musician) lived in Brockley and Lewisham
- Kwes (music record producer) born in Lewisham
- Luke Pritchard (musician) was born in Lewisham
- Maxi Priest (musician) was born and raised in Lewisham
- Merky ACE (musician) raised in Lewisham
- Mica Paris (musician) lived in Lewisham
- Natasha Bedingfield (singer/songwriter) brought up in Lewisham
- Novelist (musician) was born and grew up in Brockley
- P Money (grime artist) born and raised in Lewisham
- Shingai Shoniwa of Noisettes (musician) was born in Lewisham.
- Steve Spacek (singer and producer in Spacek and Africa Hitech) grew up in Lewisham.
- Sid Vicious

== Notable residents of Blackheath ==
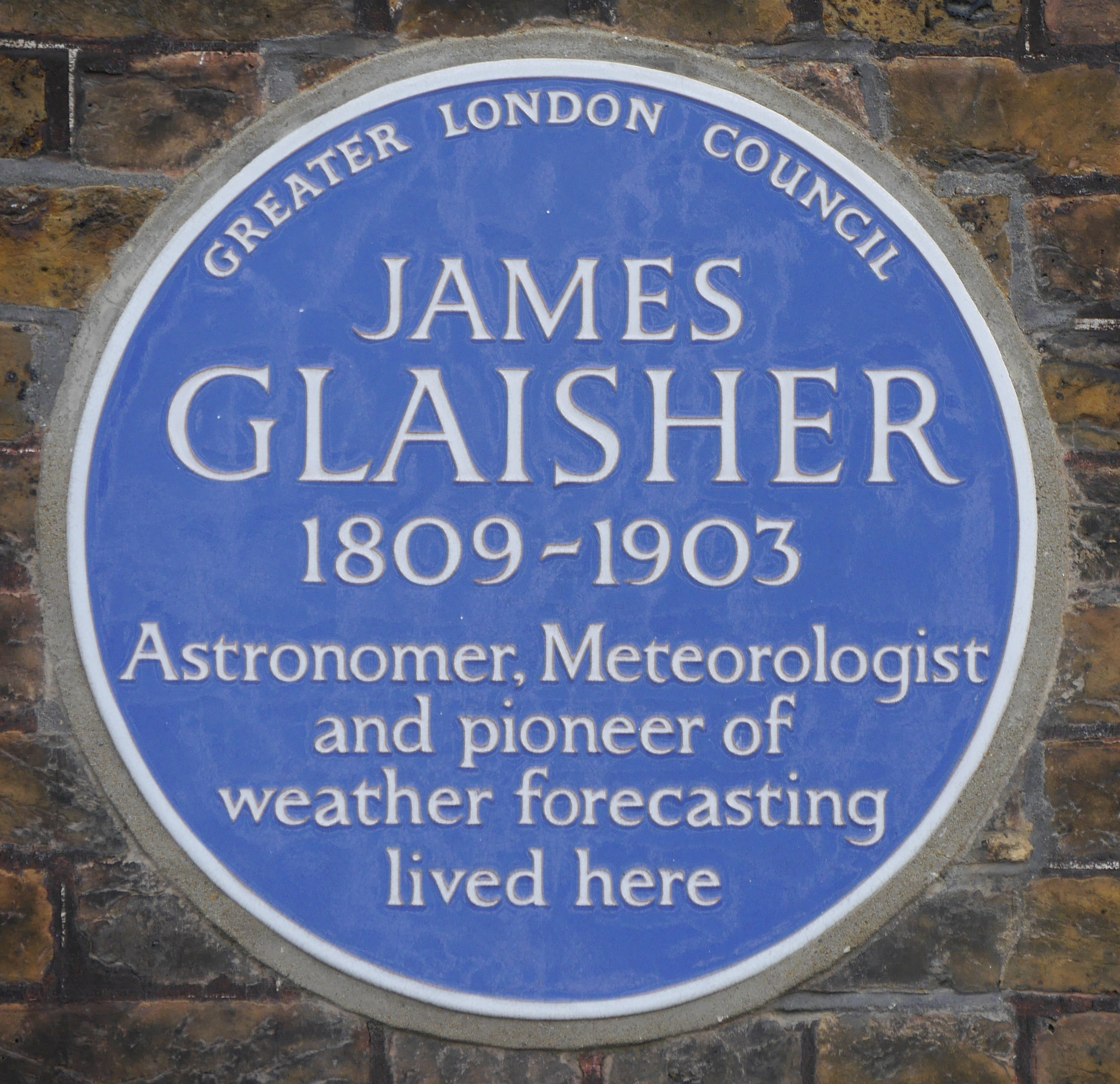
20 Dartmouth Hill

(This list includes people associated with the portion of Blackheath that lies in Greenwich.)

- Sophie Aldred, actress and television presenter, raised in Blackheath and attended Blackheath High School.
- John Julius Angerstein, whose art collection formed the basis of the National Gallery in 1824, built Woodlands House, Mycenae Road, Westcombe Park.
- His son John Angerstein, MP for Greenwich
- Danny Baker, BBC London radio presenter and television personality.
- Sir Richard Branson, entrepreneur, born in Blackheath.
- Captain Samuel Brown, naval officer, engineer and inventor, died at Vanbrugh Lodge, Vanbrugh Fields, Blackheath in 1852.
- Caroline of Brunswick, married to the Prince Regent, was banished in 1799 to a private residence ('The Pagoda' - attributed to architect Sir William Chambers) in Blackheath.
- James Callaghan, British Prime Minister 1976-1979, lived in Blackheath in the 1950s and 1960s, and his daughter Margaret went to Blackheath High School.
- Fanny Cradock, lived at 134 Shooters Hill Road.
- Emily Davison, suffragette, born in Blackheath.
- Clemence Dane, Playwright and novelist, born in Blackheath.
- Trevor Dannatt, architect, lived in Blackheath
- Walter Dannatt, entomologist, lived in Blackheath
- Francis Dodd (1874–1949), artist, lived at Arundel House, 51 Blackheath Park.
- Montague John Druitt, for many years a popular suspect in the Jack the Ripper murders, lived during the 1880s in Blackheath at 9 Eliot Place.
- Engineer Alexander Duckham, founder of the Duckhams oil company, was born in Blackheath, living in Dartmouth Grove and in Vanbrugh Castle, east Greenwich. His brother Arthur Duckham, founder of the Institution of Chemical Engineers, was also born and raised in Blackheath.
- Peter Martin Duncan (1824–1891), palaeontologist and doctor, practised in Blackheath during the 1860s.
- Astronomer Royal Sir Frank Watson Dyson, lived at 6 Vanbrugh Hill, SE3 between 1894 and 1906 (blue plaque).
- Sir Arthur Eddington (1882–1944), mathematician and astrophysicist, lived at 4 Bennett Park (blue plaque).
- Eliza Fay (1756–1816), author of Original Letters from India, ran a school in Blackheath in 1805-14.
- James Glaisher (1809–1903), pioneered modern weather forecasting techniques, lived at 20 Dartmouth Hill (blue plaque).
- Charles Gounod, composer, lived at 4 Morden Road in 1870 (blue plaque).
- Malcolm Hardee, anarchic comedian lived briefly at 33 Glenluce Road in the late 1990s.
- Nathaniel Hawthorne (1804–1864), American author, lived at 4 Pond Road in 1856 (blue plaque).
- Ginnie Hole, author and screenwriter of The Bill and Casualty.
- Jools Holland OBE, musician with the band Squeeze and solo artist, lives in Westcombe Park.
- John Hughes, The Very Reverend, lived as a child on Mycenae Road, Blackheath.
- Glenda Jackson, actress and former MP for Hampstead lived in Blackheath.
- Thomas Keell, prominent British anarchist of the early twentieth century.
- Jude Law, actor, attended John Ball Primary School.
- Albert Lee, guitarist, composer and singer.
- David Lindsay (1897–1945), novelist, born and raised in Blackheath.
- Laurence Llewelyn-Bowen (designer) lived in Blackheath.
- Elisabeth Lutyens, composer, lived in Pond Road.
- Donald McGill (1875–1962), postcard cartoonist lived at 5 Bennett Park (blue plaque).
- John Stuart Mill (1806–1873), British philosopher and political economist.
- Sir Stuart Milner-Barry, chess player and codebreaker, lived in Blackheath Park.
- Ray Moore (1942–1989), broadcaster and supporter of BBC Children In Need, lived in Blackheath.
- Blake Morrison, author, writer, prize winning poet, Professor of creative writing at Goldsmiths College, former literary editor.
- Edith Nesbit, author and Fabian, moved to 16 Dartmouth Row in 1879.
- Sir Gregory Page, 2nd Baronet, landowner, had houses in Westcombe Park and Wricklemarsh, near Lee.
- Jack Peñate, singer/songwriter
- Hugh Phillips (1940–2005), surgeon and later Deputy Lieutenant of Norfolk, born in Blackheath.
- Keith Pyott (1902–1968), played Autloc in the Doctor Who serial "The Aztecs", he had also featured in several other series and over 20 films.
- Anthony Quiney, writer and historian.
- Sir James Clark Ross, in 1831 located the magnetic North Pole, and after whom the Ross Island and Ross Sea are named, lived on Eliot Place.
- Neil Rhind (writer and historian) was born and has lived most of his life in Blackheath, living in The Lane in Blackheath's Cator Estate.
- Paul Rutherford (1940–2007), a jazz trombonist who later became the leading UK free improvising trombonist, lived in Blackheath.
- Lee Ryan, singer, songwriter and actor, member of the band Blue.
- Ignatius Sancho, 18th century black writer, composer, businessman and freed slave.
- Axel Scheffler, book illustrator, lives in Blackheath.
- Boris Starling, novelist, born and brought up in Blackheath.
- Walter Napleton Stone (1891–1917), recipient of the Victoria Cross, was born in Blackheath.
- Terry Waite, humanitarian and hostage in Lebanon (1987–1991), lived in Blackheath and worked at the local All Saints' church.
- Sir Willard White, opera singer.
- Maurice Wilkins, joint discoverer of DNA, lived on St Johns Park.
- Sir Alfred Yarrow, shipbuilder, lived at Woodlands, Mycenae Road, Westcombe Park from 1896.
- James Yeoburn, theatrical producer, lives in Blackheath with spouse Amy Beadle, casting director.
