= All Saints' Parish Hall =

Parish hall in Blackheath, London, United Kingdom

Coordinates: 51.4667°N 0.0068°E

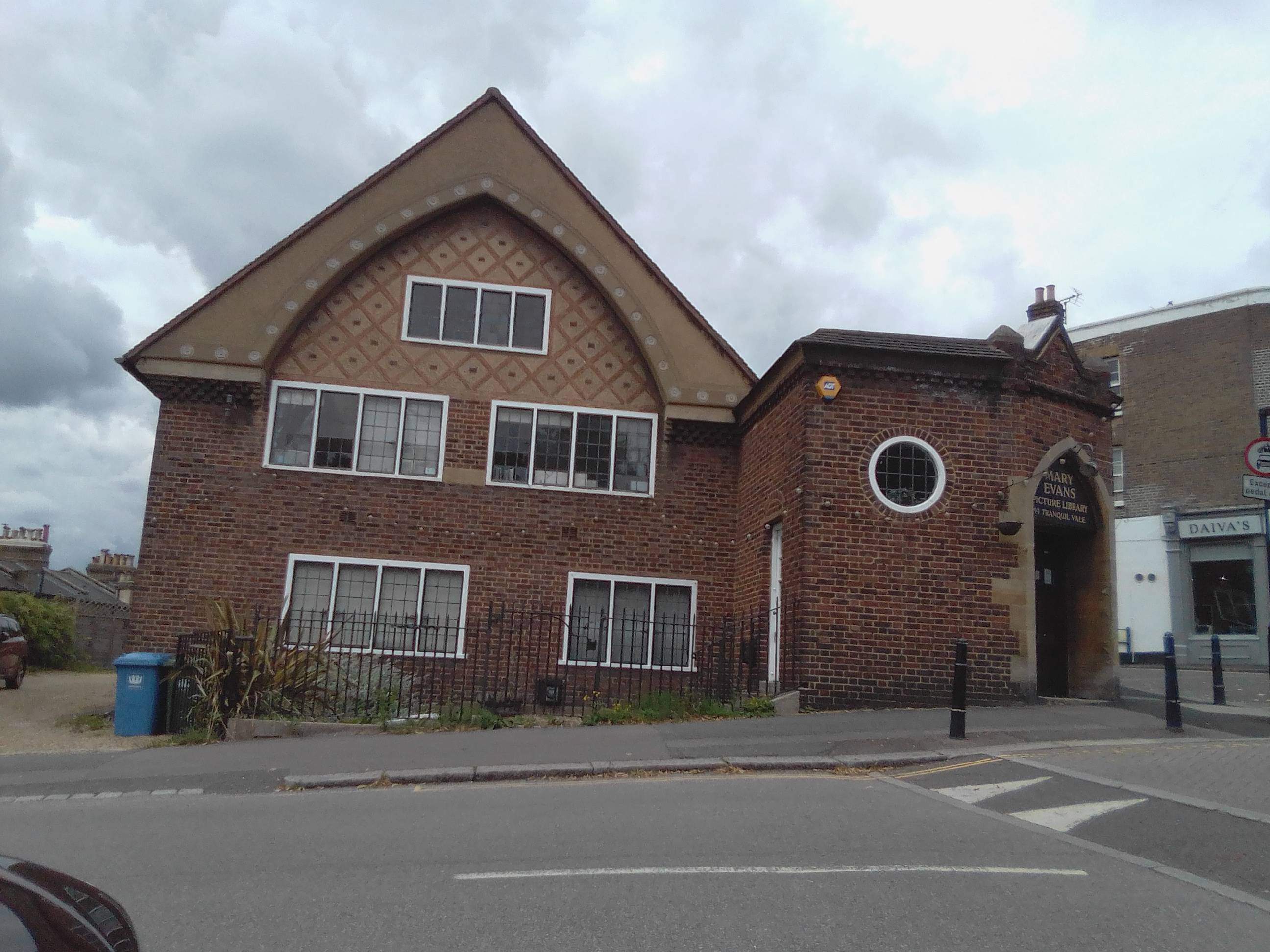
- Front facade, showing sets of three and four rectangular leaded windows, decorative mosaic design above, and circular window to left of entrance door.
- Interactive map of the All Saints' Parish Hall area

General information
- Architectural style: Arts and Crafts
- Location: Blackheath, London SE3
- Opened: 1928

Design and construction
- Architect: Charles Canning Winmill

All Saints' Parish Hall is a locally listed building in Blackheath, in the London Borough of Lewisham, south-east London, built as the parish hall for the nearby All Saints' Church. It is in an Arts and Crafts designed by architect Charles Canning Winmill, and was officially opened in 1928. The building has been used by numerous groups over the years, and was a British Restaurant during and after World War II. Since December 1988 it has been the business premises of the Mary Evans Picture Library, a company founded by Mary Evans and her husband Hilary Evans in 1964.

== History ==
=== The site pre-1928 ===
The site is in a prominent, elevated position in Blackheath village on the south-western edge of Blackheath Common. Today it is at the junction of Tranquil Vale, Southvale Road and Camden Row.

From around 1779, the site was occupied by a mansion called Camden House, later better known as Rashleigh's House. Living there was Thomas Rashleigh (1749—13 September 1833), an attorney with family connections in Cornwall — his older brother was William Rashleigh (MP for Fowey). In 1837, this building was replaced by a group of six shops, numbered 1–6 Camden Place (51–61 Tranquil Vale). During World War I, on 24 August 1916, the site was hit overnight by a bomb from a German Zeppelin airship, which extensively damaged all six shops and two adjacent houses (1 and 3 Southvale Road). The damaged buildings were later demolished, and the site stood unused for several years. The two Southvale Road houses were replaced by a pair of houses called the Southvale Mansions circa 1925-1926.

=== Planning and construction ===
In 1923, it was proposed that All Saints' Church should build a parish hall, as there was no separate building where parishioners could meet. On 21 November 1924, the church's parish hall committee discussed employing Charles Canning Winmill (1865–1945), who had recently retired from the London County Council in order to pursue private work after 31 years of service in the architects' department, where he was responsible for social housing and fire stations. He lived locally at 2 Eliot Place, Blackheath, and attended the church. In 1926 William Legge, 6th Earl of Dartmouth (1851–1936), owner of the land, donated it to the church for the building of the hall; around the same time an anonymous donor promised £350 “to buy out the lease”, and a subscription list was opened to raise money for building costs. On All Saints' Day (1 November) 1927, a service of dedication was held on the site, and in December 1927 work began on clearing the wartime debris. Construction work was delayed for six weeks in January and February 1928 due to excessively frosty weather, but then continued, with fundraising continuing in parallel. On 14 March 1928 the Foundation Stone was laid by the Earl of Dartmouth, donor of the site.

=== Architectural style ===
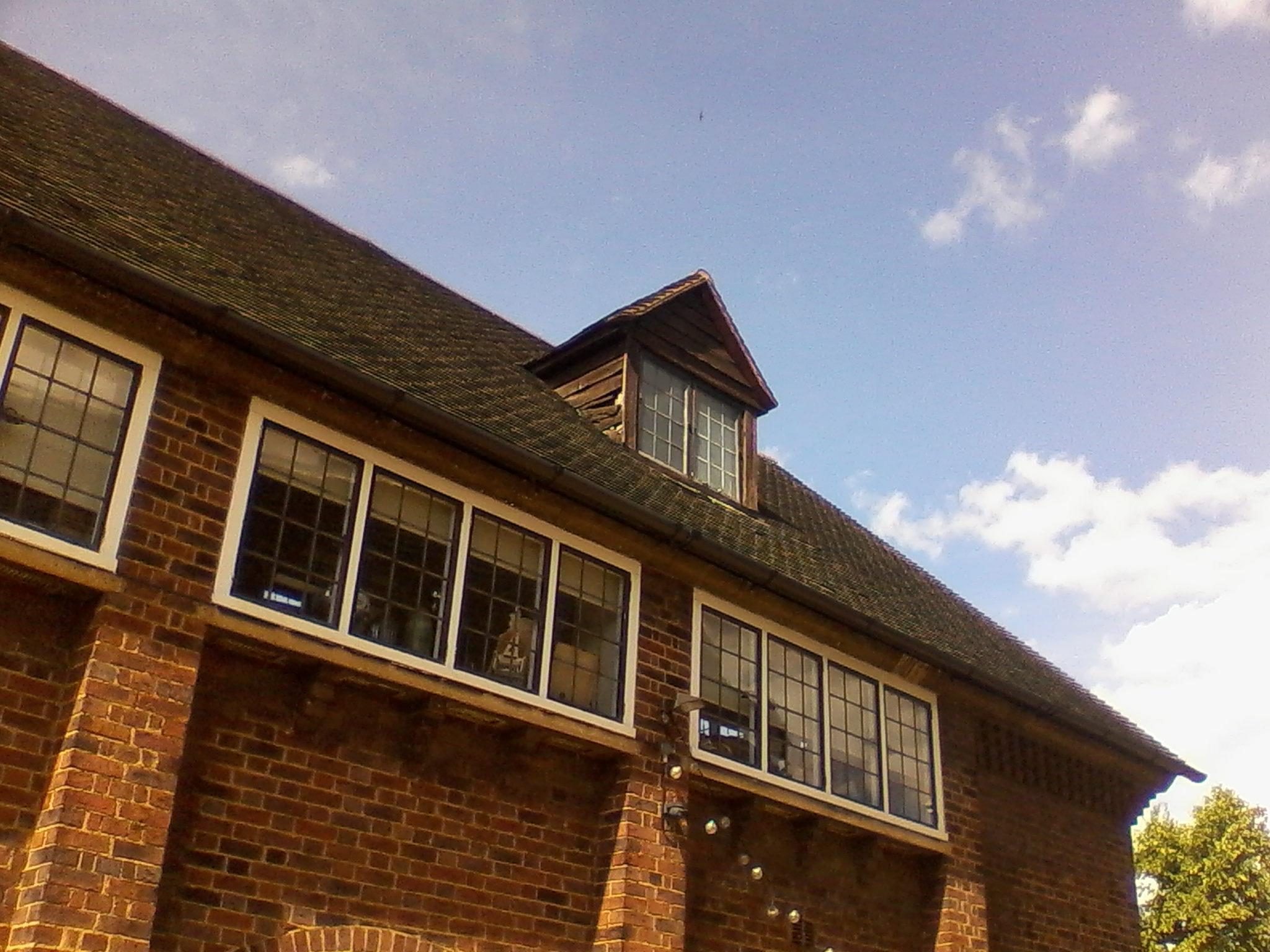
Side view, showing rectangular leaded windows in sets of four, with dormer window at roof level

Winmill was strongly influenced by the Arts and Crafts Movement, led by William Morris and the architects Philip Webb, Richard Lethaby and Charles Voysey. The building is unique, with some typical Arts and Crafts features, including leaded rectangular windows in groups of three or four, with deep windowsills on the interior and carefully designed metal window catches, three circular leaded windows on either side of the entrance door (one on the left, two on the right), dormer windows at roof level, and decorative mosaic-style design work on the front façade. Located in a conservation area, the Lewisham Council local listing describes the hall as follows:

Former parish hall. Detached. 1927-8. By Charles Canning Winmill. Brick in Flemish bond with stone dressings and plain clay tiles. Between one and two-and-a-half storeys. Pitched roofs. Flat arched windows. Oculus windows to one-storey element. Leaded lights. One storey entrance porch has double doors in pointed arch doorway in chamfered stone surround beneath dentil eaves. Principal gable (surmounting three storey element) has central flat arched rectangular window. Gable has diamond pattern comprised of red clay and rough-cast render. This set into deep pointed-arch reveal edged with roundel/flower motif. Reveal springs from brick corbelling.

=== Opening in 1928 ===
On 29 September 1928, the parish hall was blessed by the Bishop of Woolwich, Dr William Hough (1859–1934), with a dance in the evening with 200 people and music supplied by the Granville Orchestra. On 3 November 1928 the hall was formally opened by Princess Marie Louise of Schleswig-Holstein (1872–1956), granddaughter of Queen Victoria. A Christmas event was also held, with the singing of carols, a decorated tree, and Bethlehem tableaux. The four downstairs rooms (known as clubrooms) were named after patron saints, and the colour scheme was cream and brown, with blue curtains on the stage. The fundraising for the building was completed on May Day 1930, with the vicar sitting from 9am to 7pm to receive the final donations, which totalled £1,500.

=== Parish hall use, 1928–1988 ===
From 1928 onwards the building was used for All Saints' Church activities such as Parochial Church Council meetings, two separate youth clubs for 'men and girls', and fundraising events. Starting in 1929, pupils from the church's own primary school (All Saints' Infant School, located at the time in nearby Tranquil Passage) were taken to the hall for routine medical inspections, 'drill' activities and dancing lessons. Records also show that from June to September 1932, during essential roof repairs to the church building, all church services were held in the hall. From the late 1930s, the hall was used as an overflow location for All Saints' Infant School. The hall hosted an Autumn Market to raise money for the church in November 1936, and on 18 January 1937 a public meeting held in the hall about controversial local building issues was attended by more than 100 people, leading to the formation of the Blackheath Society, a local conservation society which is still in existence.

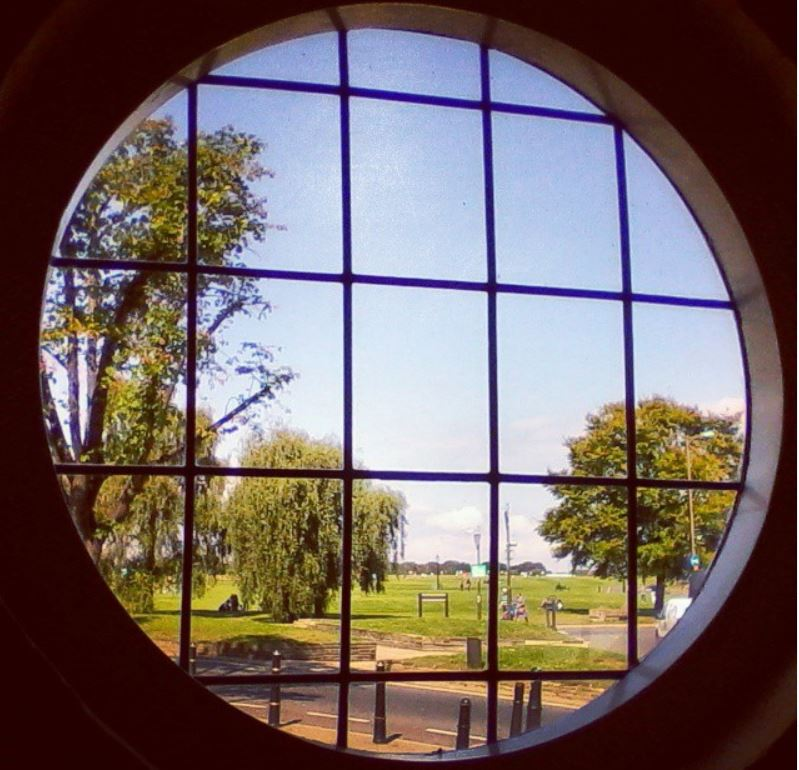
Round leaded window looking out onto Blackheath Common

After World War II began, the hall was formally requisitioned in 1940 by the London County Council to be used as a British Restaurant, designed to provide low-cost hot lunchtime meals to local residents and workers; after the war it served as a 'civic restaurant', and continued under LCC control until 1955. The hall was then handed back to the church and, after some redecoration, rooms were let to various community groups. For example, the Greenwich & Lewisham Antiquarian Society held an exhibition in November 1955, and the Blackheath Society held an exhibition in March 1959. Some regular uses included a maternity and child welfare clinic (operating through to the 1970s), the Sallie Lewis dancing school, badminton sessions, and a Montessori School.

=== Mary Evans Picture Library, 1988–present ===
In 1988 the parish hall was judged by the Diocese of Southwark to be surplus to requirements, and a suitable organisation was sought to take on the tenancy. In due course, the entire building was let to the Mary Evans Picture Library, which had been working in a smaller office building next to Blackheath railway station and needed to expand. The move took place over the Christmas/New Year holidays of 1988/1989, and the company is still in residence today. In September 2016 and again in September 2017 Mary Evans staff members took part in Open House London events, giving visitors guided tours of the building and telling them about its history.
