= Mary Forbes Evans =

English librarian and author (1936–2010)

- Born: Mary Forbes Lander; May 5, 1936; Hendon, London, England
- Died: June 29, 2010 (aged 74); Greenwich, London, England
- Known for: Co-founder, Mary Evans Picture Library
- Spouse: Hilary Evans
- Children: 1

Mary Forbes Evans (née Lander, 5 May 1936 – 29 June 2010) was a British writer, collector and the co-founder, with her husband Hilary Evans, of the Mary Evans Picture Library.

== Early life ==
Caroline Mary Forbes Lander was born on 5 May 1936 at 8 Cotswold Gardens, Hendon, London, the youngest of four daughters of Digby Forbes Lander (1891–1969), an aircraft works accounts clerk, and his wife, Norah Doris Caroline Lander, née Williams (1898–1970). She lived in Berkhamsted, Hertfordshire, before moving to Southern Rhodesia at the age of seven. The family returned to England in 1950.

Lander met her future husband Hilary Agard Evans (1929–2011), an advertising copywriter, and the son of Eric Agard Evans, a schoolmaster, when she was a teenager at a party. They married in 1956.

== Career ==
Mary Evans had been a collector since childhood, especially of illustrated children's books. She shared a passion for collecting pictures and images with her husband Hilary Evans, and they explored book fairs, bookshops, used book stalls and markets, purchasing books, prints, photographs, engravings, cartoons, illustrations and assorted ephemera - "anything with an image". Their "magnificent obsession" soon filled their small flat in Kensington Church Street, so they moved to a small house in Blackheath, in south-east London.

In 1964, the couple founded the Mary Evans Picture Library, and in 1965, Hilary Evans left his job in advertising to work full-time with his wife on the library. Eventually the collection of tens of thousands of volumes, with hundreds of thousands of images, grew too large for their house, and the company moved to a small office near Blackheath station; after a few years there, still growing, it moved again to larger premises, the former parish hall of All Saints' Blackheath. Mary Evans embraced technological change and continued to innovate, and by the time of her death the company employed 14 people, had a website containing nearly one million images, and an annual turnover of over £1 million.

Together with Hilary, Mary Evans wrote several books featuring images from the library, including The Party that Lasted 100 Days: the Late Victorian Season (1976) and The Man who Drew the Drunkard's Daughter: the Life and Art of George Cruikshank (1978). They co-edited The Picture Researchers' Handbook, up until its eighth edition.

== Later life ==
Mary Evans died on 29 June 2010, at Riverlee Nursing Home, Greenwich. Hilary Evans died on 27 July 2011. They were survived by their daughter, Valentine Evans.
