= Vernon Harrison =

British photographer (1912–2001)

Vernon George Wentworth Harrison (14 March 1912 – 14 October 2001) was a president of the Royal Photographic Society, and a professional "research worker of disputed documents".

== Biography ==
External image
- Vernon Harrison

Harrison was born in Sutton Coldfield, Warwickshire, England in March 1912, to a schoolteacher father. Harrison was educated at Bishop Vesey's Grammar School, before reading Physics, Chemistry and Mathematics at the University of Birmingham. Subsequently, he undertook three years of postgraduate research in the Physics Department, studying in particular "the use of photography and photomicrography as recording media."

Obtaining his PhD, Harison was briefly employed in the London laboratories of the Printing & Allied Trades Research Association (PATRA) as a research physicist, shortly before war broke out, and he took on a role at the Ministry of Supply. PATRA's records and equipment was destroyed in air raids on London, and new labs south of London in Leatherfield only opened in 1947, at which point Harrison began work "on the optical properties of paper, color printing, and the quality of halftone reproduction". In 1957, he was promoted to the position of Director of Research, finding himself responsible for staff by then numbering around 120.

=== Forgeries and authenticity ===
In 1967, he joined Thos. De La Rue & Co. (printer of banknotes, postage stamps, stock certificates, passports, etc.) as Research Manager in their Maidenhead research centre. Part of his – and the centre's – role was "to study the methods of counterfeiters and forgers and to devise methods of improving the security of the Company's products". Developing an interest in forgeries of all kinds, upon his retirement in 1977, Harrison set himself up in a private, independent capacity to examine suspect and questionable documents for all sides of the legal system – defence and prosecution – swiftly becoming "used to giving evidence in Court and submitting to cross-examination".

He has in this role, examined a wide range of subjects and mediums:

"from disputed Elizabethan documents to graffiti on walls, dubious wills, forged mortgage agreements and financial documents in profusion, anonymous and poison-pen letters, threatening notes, a spy case, examination of counterfeit currency and illicit printing plates, identification of banknote paper recovered from drains, and the evidential value of photographs."

=== Fortean and Psychical interests ===
Harrison has been a member of the Society for Psychical Research (SPR), and was co-founder – with Hilary Evans, Jenny Randles, Fortean Times-founder/editor Bob Rickard and Hugh Pincott (former secretary and treasurer of SPR) – of the Association for the Scientific Study of Anomalous Phenomena (ASSAP).

In the wake of purported photographs of the Loch Ness Monster taken by Anthony 'Doc' Shiels in 1977, Harrison was contacted by Tim Dinsdale for expert advice on their authenticity. Harrison writes in his letter, dated 3 December 1977, and published in Fortean Times No. 29 (Summer 1979), that he found:

"the transparency to be quite normal and [that] there is no evidence of double exposure, superimposition of images or handwork with bleach or dye."

He goes on to all-but-rule-out the object (allegedly "Nessie") as being a branch, but concludes however that "[i]t is not possible to say from a single still transparency exactly what the photograph represents."

In 1984, Harrison became interested in the early SPR 'Hodgson Report' in which Helena Petrovna Blavatsky was stigmatised as one of the most gifted, ingenious and interesting 'impostors' in history. Harrison studied the various documents concerned, for an initial report – "J'Accuse: An Examination of the Hodgson Report of 1885" – published on 8 May 1986 by the SPR (and revised after more research by Harrison in 1997). Harrison ultimately concluded that the Hodgson Report was not scientifically undertaken, but was "flawed and untrustworthy," and "should be read with great caution, if not disregarded."

=== Other interests ===
A lifelong photography enthusiast, he was, between 1974 and 1976, President of the Royal Photographic Society of Great Britain, and among his other interests counts the music of Franz Liszt. He is the surviving co-founder, and a past chairman, of the (English) Liszt Society.

Harrison describes himself as "reading the equations of Schrodinger and Dirac through the eyes of Francis Thompson."

== Partial bibliography ==
- Theory of the Half-tone Screen (The Photographic Journal)
- The signatures on the walls of Queens house in Linton Cambs (SPR proceedings, Oct 1994)
- HP Blavatsky and the SPR (1997)
- "Harry Price and the Rudi Schneider Phenomena" in Psychical Studies – the Journal of the Unitarian Society for Psychical Studies, No. 38, Winter 1987
