= Blackheath, London =

Area of south-east London, England

Coordinates: 51.47°N 0.01°E

Blackheath
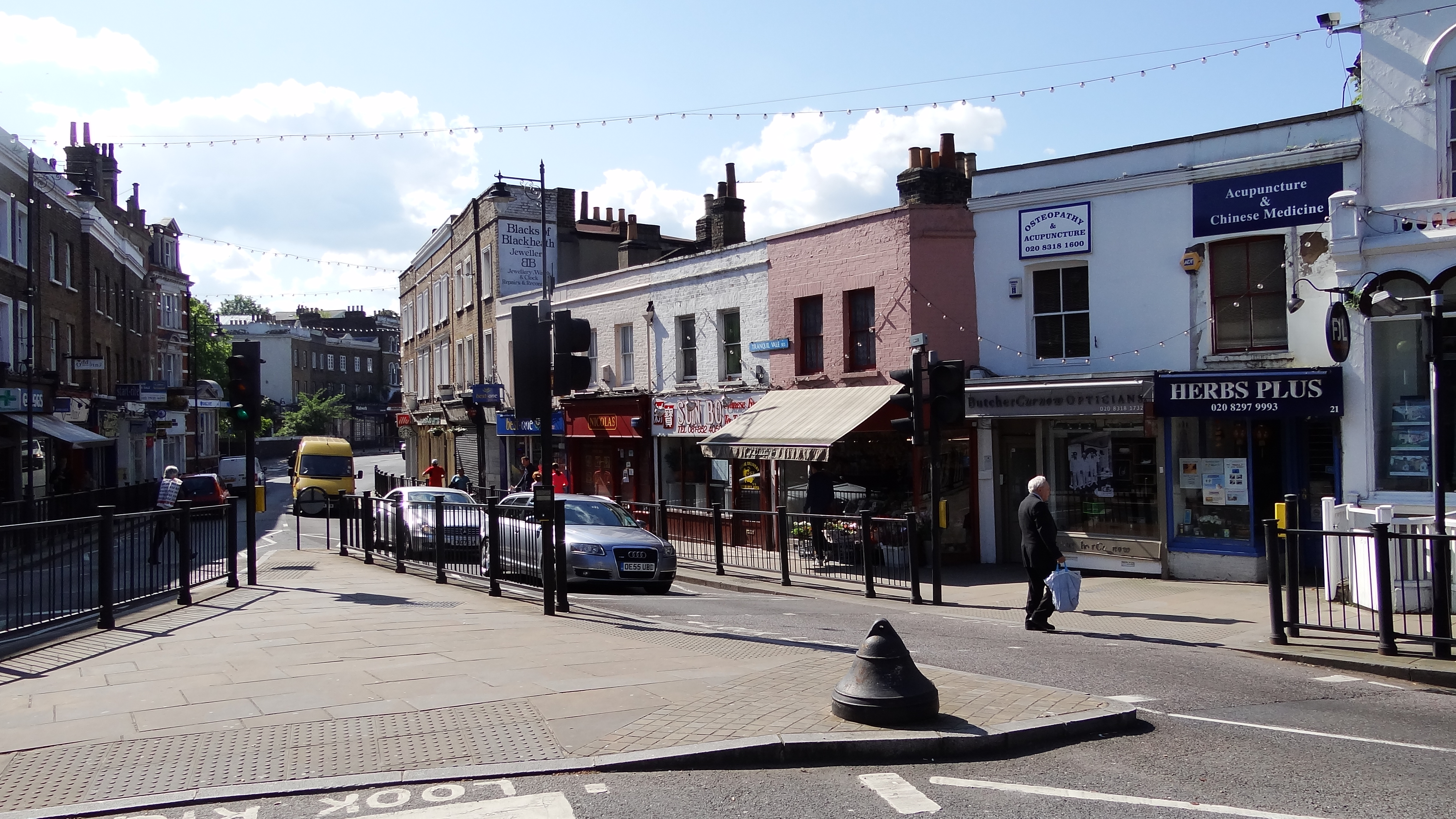
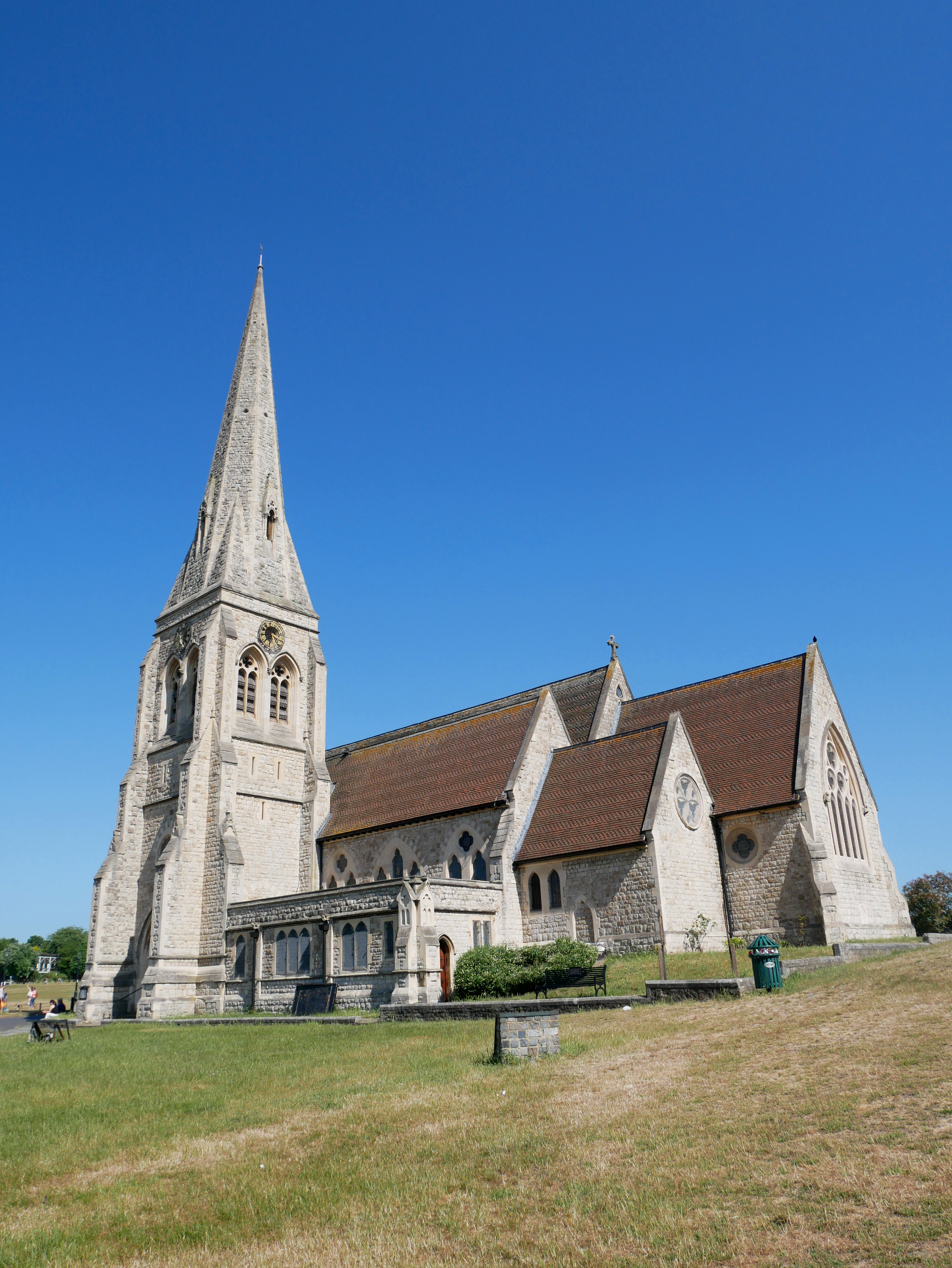
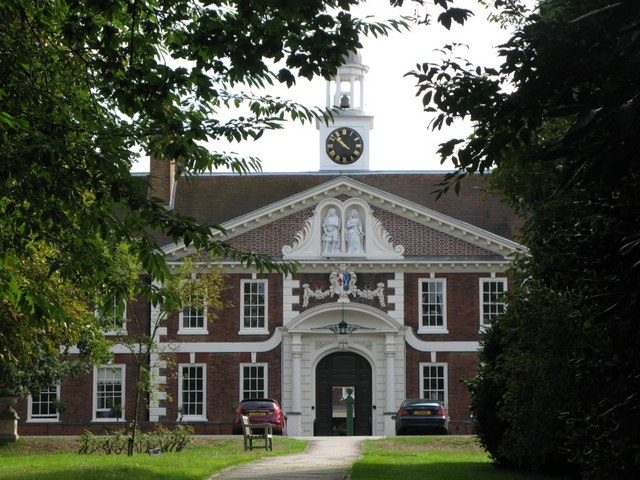
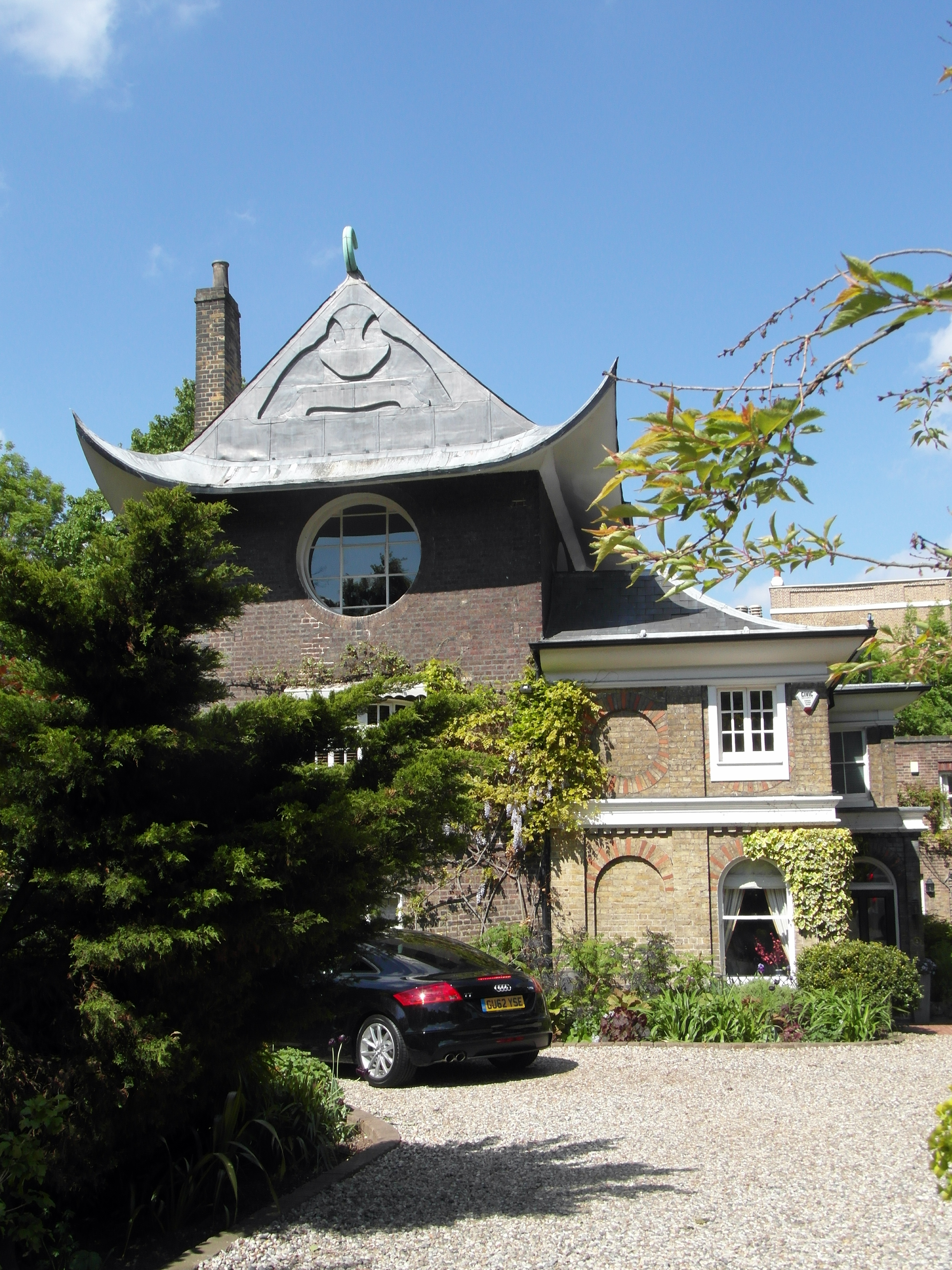
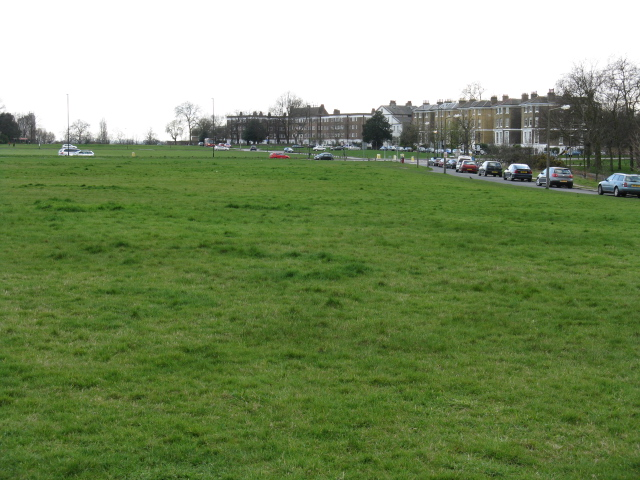
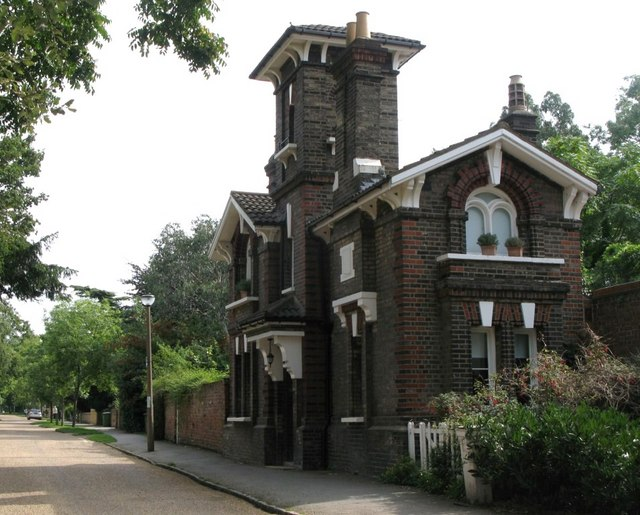
- Blackheath Village All Saints' Church Morden College The Pagoda The Heath Cator Estate

- Location within Greater London
- Population: 26,914 (2011 Census. Lewisham Ward: 14,039) (2011 Census. Blackheath Westcombe Ward: 12,875)
- OS grid reference: TQ395765
  - Charing Cross: 6.4 mi (10.3 km) WNW
- London borough: Lewisham; Greenwich
- Ceremonial county: Greater London
- Region: London
- Country: England
- Sovereign state: United Kingdom
- Post town: LONDON
- Postcode district: SE3, SE12, SE13
- Dialling code: 020
- Police: Metropolitan
- Fire: London
- Ambulance: London
- UK Parliament: Lewisham North; Greenwich and Woolwich; Eltham and Chislehurst
- London Assembly: Greenwich and Lewisham

Blackheath is an area in Southeast London, straddling the border of the Royal Borough of Greenwich and the London Borough of Lewisham. Historically within the county of Kent, it is located 1-mile (1.6 km) northeast of Lewisham, 1.5 miles (2.4 km) south of Greenwich and 6.4 miles (10.3 km) southeast of Charing Cross, the traditional centre of London.

The area southwest of its station and in its ward is named Lee Park. Its northern neighbourhood of Vanbrugh Park is also known as St John's Blackheath and despite forming a projection has amenities beyond its traditional reach named after the heath. To its west is the core public green area that is the heath and Greenwich Park, in which sit major London tourist attractions including the Greenwich Observatory and the Greenwich Prime Meridian. Blackheath railway station is located in the southern part of Blackheath.

== History ==
=== Etymology ===
Records and meanings

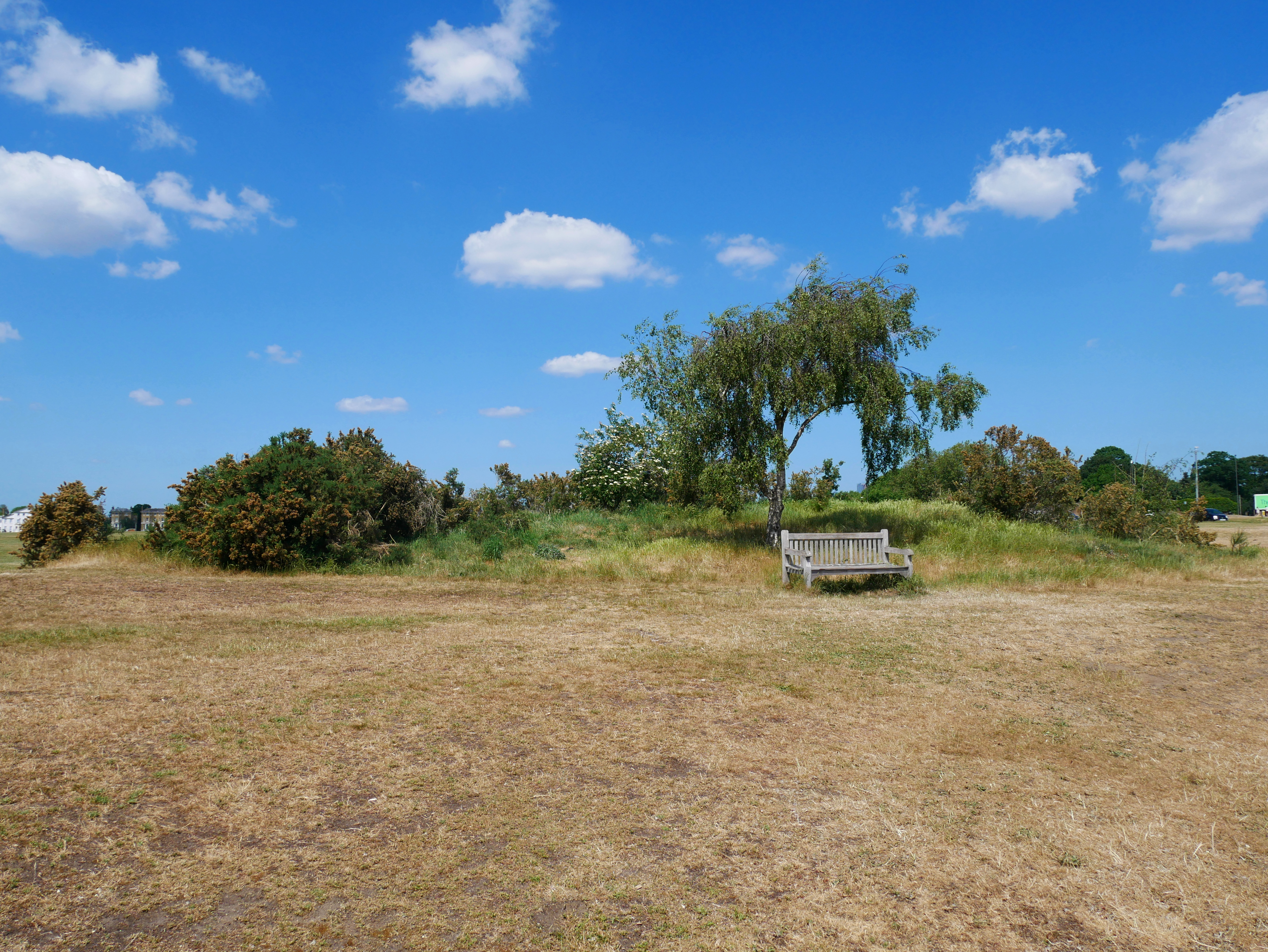
The Whitefield Mount is a mound on Blackheath Common

The name is from Old English spoken words 'blæc' and 'hǣth'. The name is recorded in 1166 as Blachehedfeld which means "dark, or black heath field" – field denotes an enclosure or clearing. Lewis's topological dictionary opines, considering the adjective developed equally into derived term bleak, that Blackheath "takes its name either from the colour of the soil, or from the bleakness of its situation" before adding, reflecting Victorian appreciation, mention of "numerous villas with which it now abounds...it is pleasantly situated on elevated ground, commanding diversified and extensive views of the surrounding country, which is richly cultivated, and abounds with fine scenery". It was an upland, open space that was the meeting place of the hundred of Blackheath.

Formal name for estates around the heath

By 1848 Blackheath was noted as a place with two dependent chapels under Lewisham vestry and another, St Michael and All Angels, erected 1828-1830 designed by George Smith. The latter made use of £4000 plus land from land developer John Cator, plus a further £11,000 from elsewhere. The name of Blackheath gained independent official boundaries by the founding of an Anglican parish in 1854 (construction of the parish church, All Saints, began in 1857), then others (in 1859, 1883 and 1886) which reflected considerable housing built on nearby land.

In local government, Blackheath never saw independence; at first split between the Lewisham, Lee, Charlton and Greenwich vestries or civil parish councils and Kidbrooke liberty, which assembled into Greenwich, Plumstead (in final years called Lee) and Lewisham Districts, then re-assembled with others into Greenwich and Lewisham metropolitan boroughs in 1900.

Etymological myth

An urban myth is Blackheath could derive from the 1665 Plague or the Black Death of the mid-14th century. A local burial pit is nonetheless likely during the Black Death, given the established village and safe harbour (hithe) status of Greenwich. At those times the high death rate meant that a guaranteed churchyard burial became impractical.

=== Archaeology ===
A key Celtic trackway (becoming a Roman road and later Watling Street) scaled the rise that is shared with Greenwich Park and a peak 1 mile (1.6 km) east-by-southeast, Shooters Hill. In the west this traversed the mouth of Deptford Creek (the River Ravensbourne), a corruption or throwback to earlier pronunciation of deep ford. Other finds can be linked to passing trade connected with royal palaces. In 1710, several Roman urns were dug up, two of which were of fine red clay, one of a spherical, and the other of a cylindrical, form; and in 1803, several more were discovered in the gardens of the Earl of Dartmouth and given to the British Museum.

=== Royal setting ===
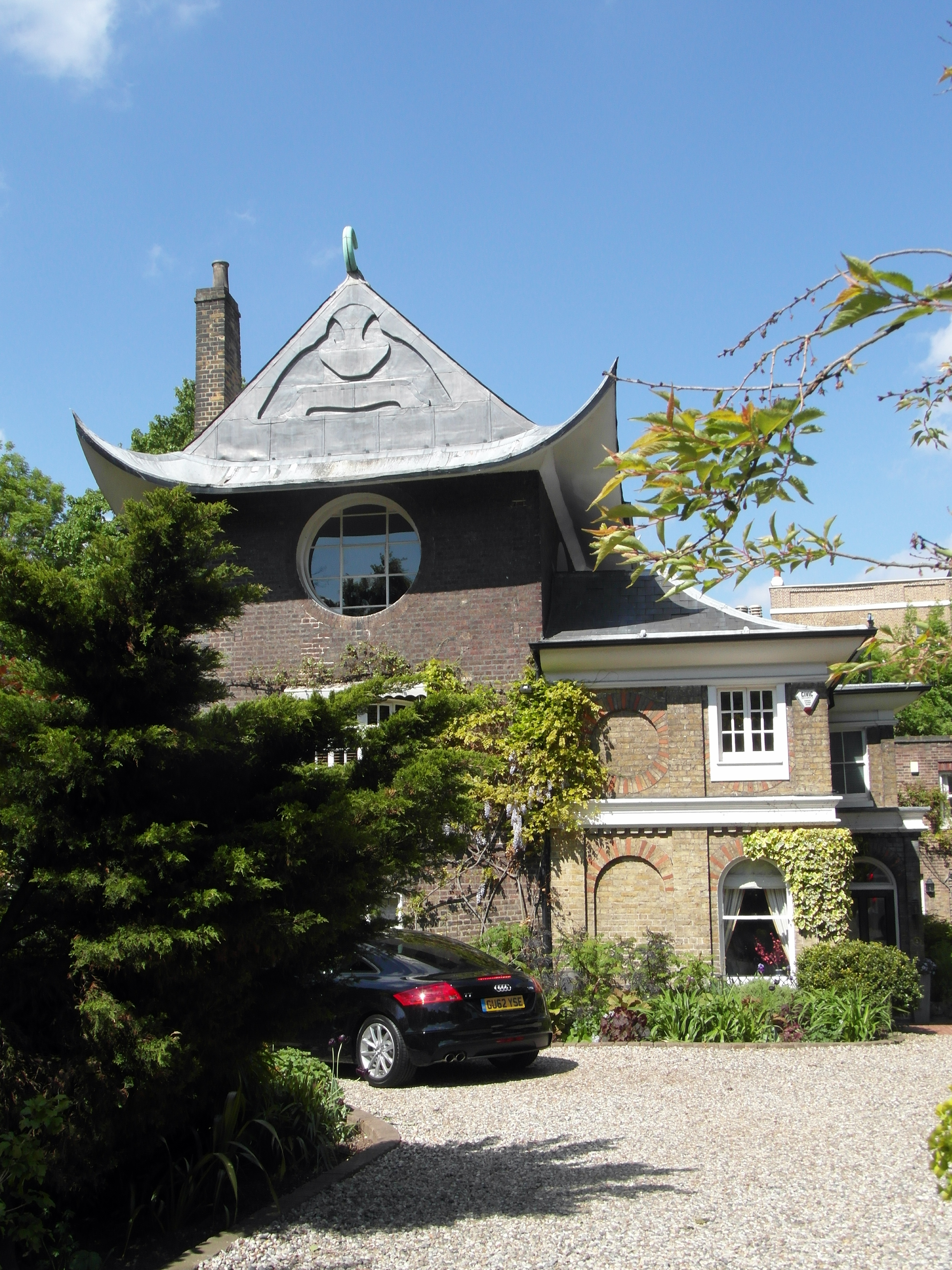
The Pagoda, built 1760

Certain monarchs passed through and their senior courtiers kept residences here and in Greenwich. Before the Tudor-built Greenwich Palace and Stuart-built Queen's House, one of the most frequently used was Eltham Palace about 2.5 miles (4.0 km) to the southeast of the ridge, under the late Plantagenets, before cessation as a royal residence in the 16th century.

On the north side of the heath, Ranger's House, a medium-sized red brick Georgian mansion in the Palladian style, backs directly onto Greenwich Park. Associated with the Ranger of Greenwich Park, a royal appointment, the house was the Ranger's official residence for most of the 19th century. Neighbouring Montagu House, demolished in 1815, was a royal residence of Caroline of Brunswick. Since 2002, Ranger's House has housed the Wernher Collection of art.

The Pagoda is a notably exquisite home, built in 1760 by Sir William Chambers in the style of a traditional Chinese pagoda. It was later leased to the Prince Regent, principally used as a summer home by Caroline of Brunswick.

=== Meeting point ===
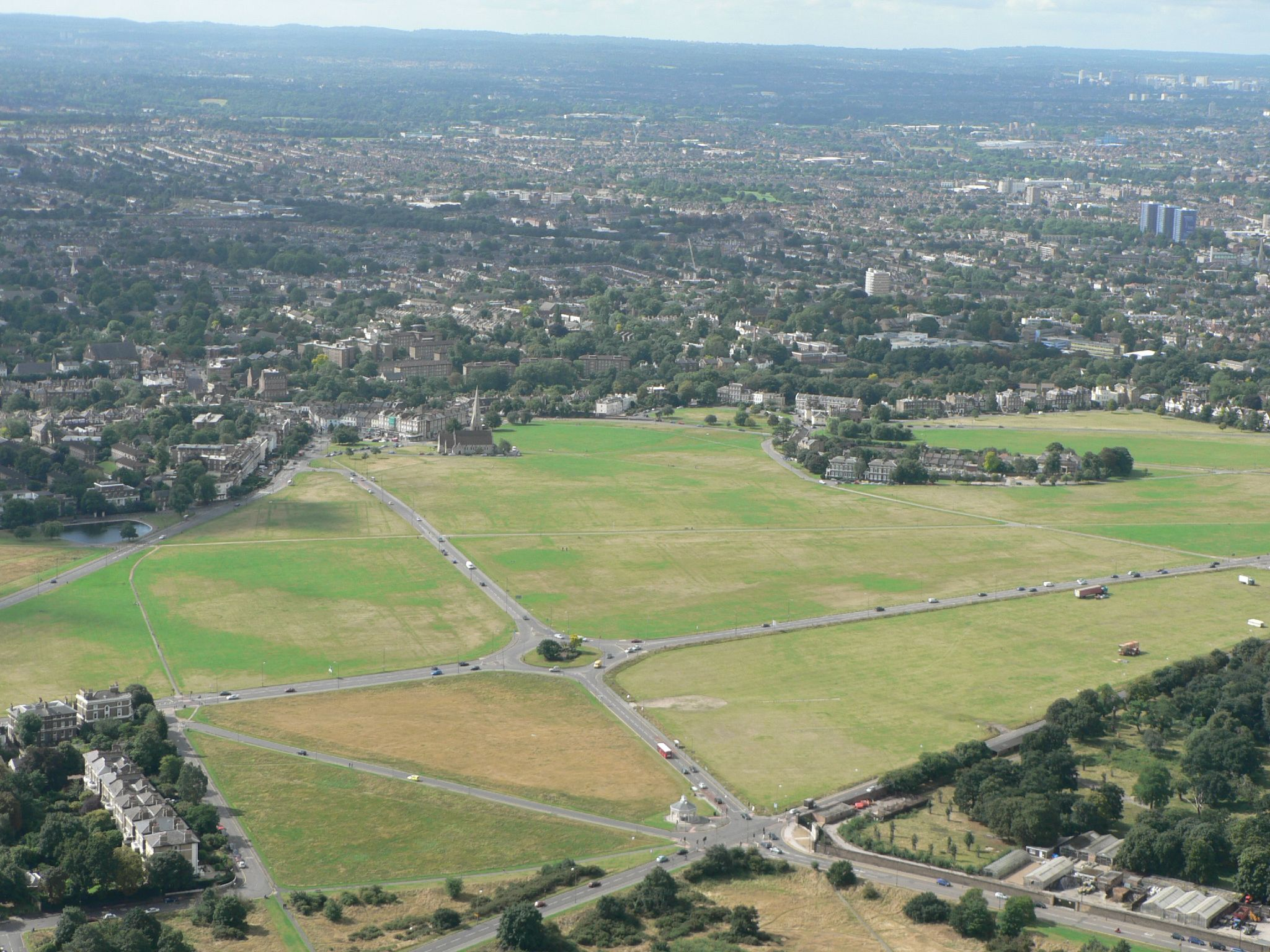
An aerial view of the heath looking south, with All Saints' Church in the centre rear of the heath

Blackheath was a rallying point for Wat Tyler's Peasants' Revolt of 1381, and for Jack Cade's Kentish rebellion in 1450, both recalled by road names on the west side of the heath. After camping at Blackheath, Cornish rebels were defeated at the foot of the west slope in the Battle of Deptford Bridge, sometimes called the Battle of Blackheath, on 17 June 1497.

In 1400, Henry IV of England met here with Byzantine Emperor Manuel II Palaiologos who toured western royalty to seek support to oppose Bayezid I (Bajazet), the Ottoman Sultan. In 1415, the lord mayor and aldermen of London, in their robes of state, attended by 400 of the principal citizens, clothed in scarlet, came hither in procession to meet Henry V of England on his triumphant return from the Battle of Agincourt.

Blackheath was, along with Hounslow Heath, a common assembly point for army forces, such as in 1673 when the Blackheath Army was assembled under Marshal Schomberg to serve in the Third Anglo-Dutch War. In 1709–10, army tents were set up on Blackheath to house a large part of the 15,000 or so German refugees from the Palatinate and other regions who fled to England, most of whom subsequently settled in America or Ireland.

With Watling Street carrying stagecoaches across the heath, en route to north Kent and the Channel ports, it was also a notorious haunt of highwaymen during the 17th and 18th centuries. As reported in Edward Walford's Old and New London (1878), "In past times it was planted with gibbets, on which the bleaching bones of men who had dared to ask for some extension of liberty, or who doubted the infallibility of kings, were left year after year to dangle in the wind." In 1909 Blackheath had a local branch of the London Society for Women's Suffrage.

=== Mineral extraction ===
The Vanbrugh Pits, known locally as the Dips, are on the north-east of the heath. A former gravel workings site, it has long been reclaimed by nature and form a feature in its near-flat expanse; particularly attractive in spring when its gorse blossoms brightly.

=== Vanbrugh Park ===
The remains of the pits and adjoining neighbourhood Vanbrugh Park, a north-east projection of Blackheath with its own church, so also termed St John's Blackheath, are named after Sir John Vanbrugh, architect of Blenheim Palace and Castle Howard, who had a house with very large grounds adjoining the heath and its continuation Greenwich Park. The house which was originally built around 1720 remains, remodelled slightly, Vanbrugh Castle. In his estate he had 'Mince Pie House' built for his family, which survived until 1911.

Its church, St John the Evangelist's, was designed in 1853 by Arthur Ashpitel. The Blackheath High School buildings on Vanbrugh Park include the Church Army Chapel.

=== Blackheath Park ===
A map showing the Blackheath ward of Lewisham Metropolitan Borough as it appeared in 1916.

Blackheath Park occupies almost all of former 0.4-square-mile (1.0 km^{2}) Wricklemarsh House. Developed into upper middle class homes by John Cator, it forms the south-east of Blackheath: from Lee Road, Roque Lane, Fulthorp Road and the Plantation to all houses and gardens of right-angled Manor Way.

Built up in the late 18th and early 19th centuries, it contains large and refined Georgian and Victorian houses – particularly Michael Searles' crescent of semi-detached/terrace houses linked by colonnades, The Paragon (c. 1793-1807). Its alternate name, the Cator Estate, extends to lands earlier those of Sir John Morden, whose Morden College (1695) is a landmark in the north, with views of the heath. The estate has 1950s and '60s Span houses and flats with gardens with discreet parking.

Its Anglican church, St Michael & All Angels, is dubbed the Needle of Kent in honour of its tall, thin spire. It is also nicknamed the Devil's Pick or the Devil's Toothpick. Nearby, within the Blackheath Park conservation area, is Our Lady of Christians Church, a Catholic church built from 1890 to 1891 and designed by Alfred Edward Purdie in the Gothic Revival style. It has a complete set of stained glass windows by Hardman & Co. and it is a Grade II listed building.

=== Other churches ===
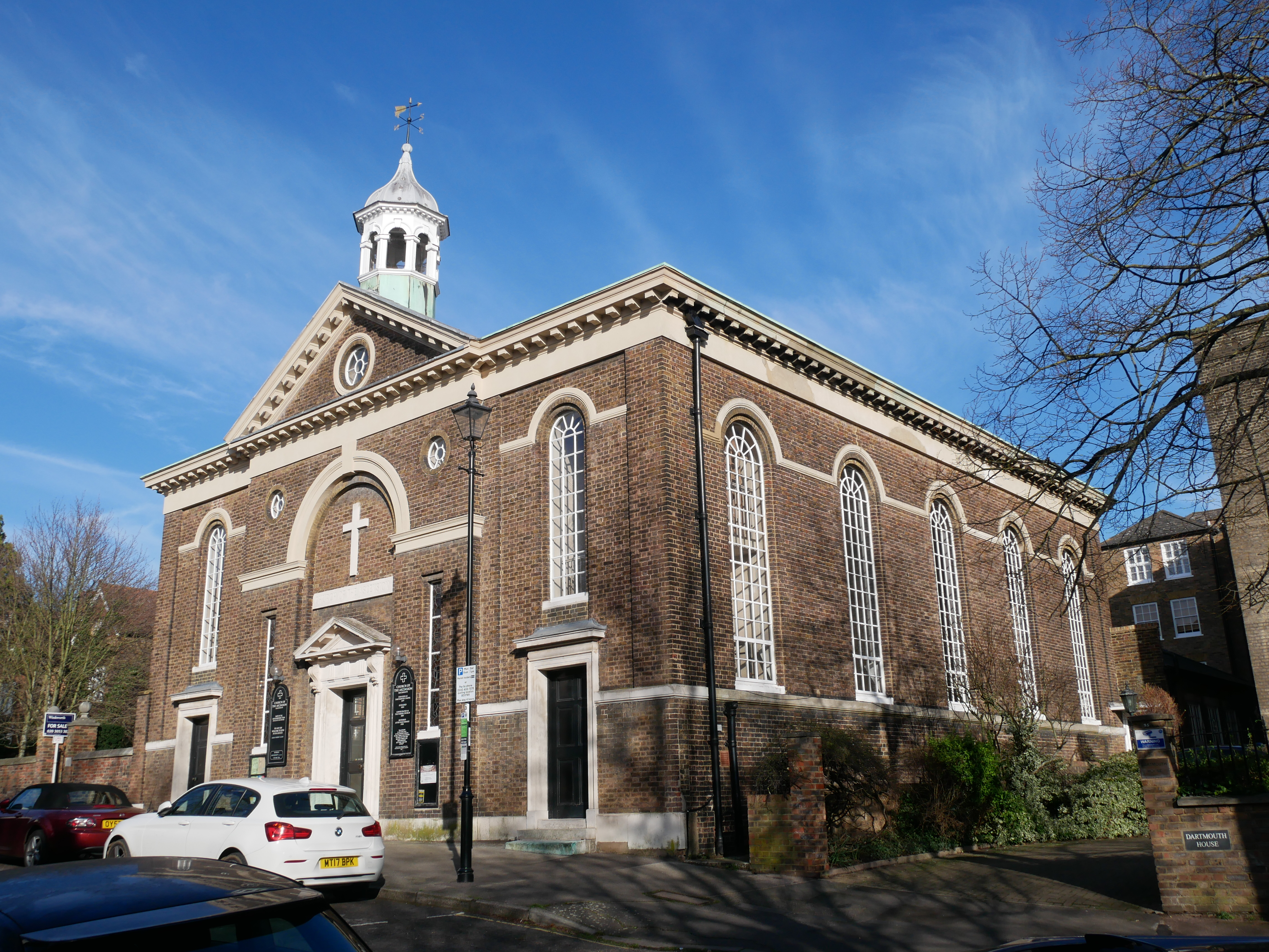
The Church of the Ascension in Blackheath, a Grade II* structure

The Church of the Ascension (see local II* listed buildings) was founded by Susannah Graham late in the 17th century. Its rebuilding was arranged about 1750 by her descendant, the 1st Earl of Dartmouth. Further rebuilding took place in the 1830s leaving at least parts of the east end from the earlier rebuild. At this time galleries for worshippers overlooked three sides.

=== Ownership and management of the heath ===
Metropolitan Commons Supplemental Act 1871
- Act of Parliament
- Parliament of the United Kingdom
- Long title: An Act to confirm a scheme under "The Metropolitan Commons Act, 1866," relating to Blackheath.
- Citation: 34 & 35 Vict. c. lvii

Dates
- Royal assent: 29 June 1871

Other legislation
- Relates to: Metropolitan Commons Act 1866

Text of statute as originally enacted

Under the Metropolitan Commons Supplemental Act 1871 (34 & 35 Vict. c. lvii), the management of the heath passed by statute to the Metropolitan Board of Works. Unlike the commons of Hackney, Tooting Bec and Clapham, its transfer was agreed at no expense, because the Earl of Dartmouth agreed to allow the encroachment to his manorial rights. It is held in trust for public benefit under the Metropolitan Commons Act 1866 (29 & 30 Vict. c. 122).

It passed to the London County Council in 1889, then to the Greater London Council, then in 1986 to the two boroughs of Greenwich and Lewisham, as to their respective extents. No trace can be found of use as common land, but only as minimal fertility land exploited by its manorial owners (manorial waste) and mainly for small-scale mineral extraction. Main freeholds, excluding many roads, vest in the Earl of Dartmouth. That was the Royal Manor of Greenwich, the Crown Estate. The heath's chief natural resource is gravel, and the freeholders retain rights over its extraction.

== Sport ==
In 1608, according to tradition, Blackheath was the place where golf was introduced to England. The Royal Blackheath Golf Club, based in nearby Eltham since 1923, was one of the first golf associations established outside Scotland, and possibly the first golf club ever established. Blackheath also gave its name to the first hockey club, established during the mid 19th century.

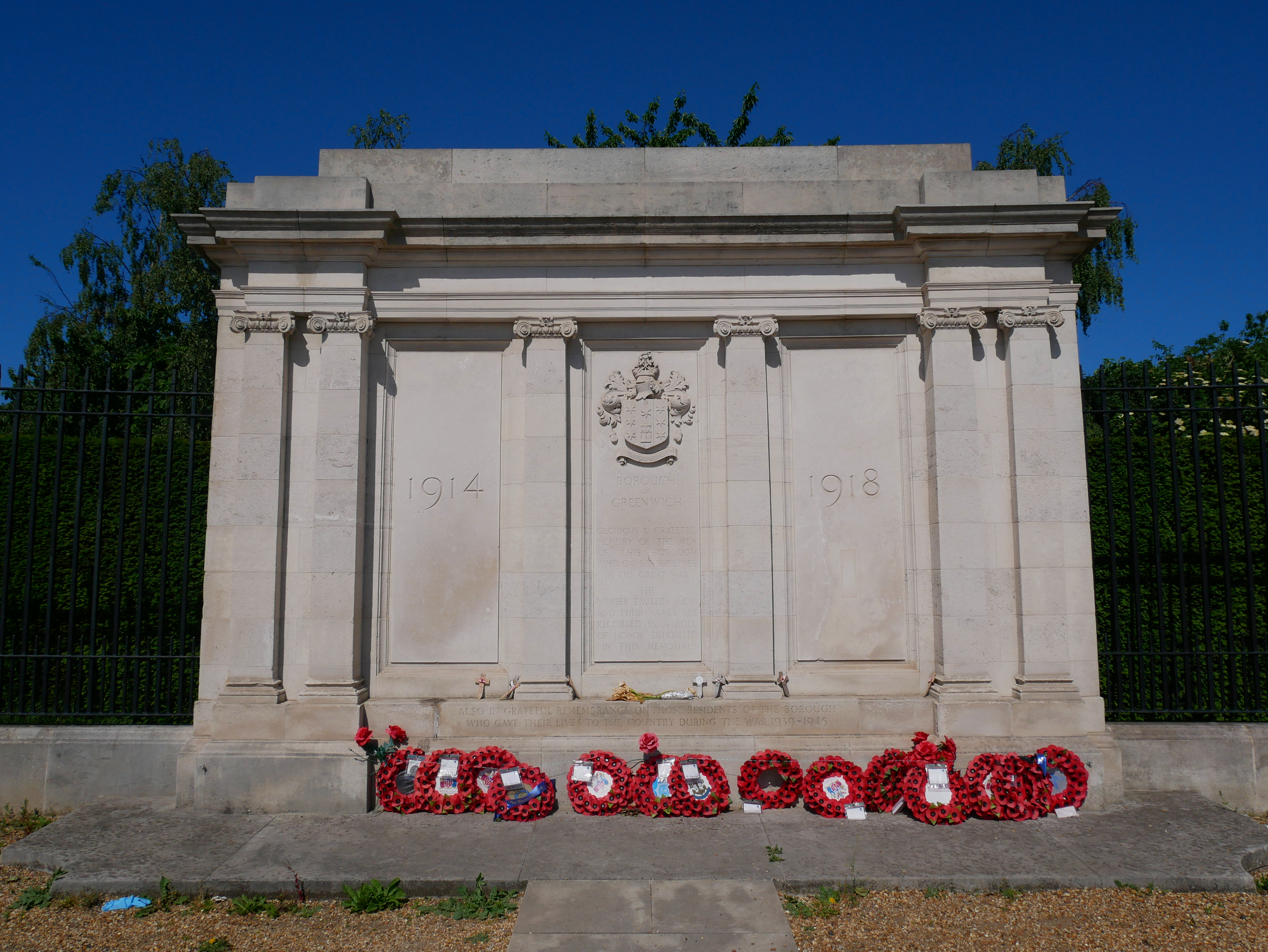
The war memorial in Blackheath

In the 18th century, Blackheath was the home of Greenwich Cricket Club and a venue for cricket matches. The earliest known senior match was Kent v London in August 1730. A contemporary newspaper report said "the Kentish champions would have lost their honours by being beat at one innings if time had permitted". The last recorded match was Kent v London in August 1769, Kent winning by 47 runs.

Cricket continued to be played on the 'Heath' but at a junior level. By 1890, London County Council was maintaining 36 pitches. Blackheath Cricket Club has been part of the sporting fabric of the area, joining forces with Blackheath Rugby Club in 1883 to purchase and develop the Rectory Field as a home ground in Charlton. Blackheath Cricket Club hosted 84 Kent County matches between 1887 and 1971.

Blackheath Rugby Club, founded in 1858, is one of the oldest documented rugby clubs in the world and was located until 2016 at Rectory Field on Charlton Road. The Blackheath club also organised the world's first rugby international, between England and Scotland in Edinburgh on 27 March 1871, and hosted the first international between England and Wales ten years later – the players meeting and getting changed at the Princess of Wales public house. Blackheath was one of the 12 founding members of the Football Association in 1863, as well as nearby Blackheath Proprietary School and Percival House (Blackheath).

Along with neighbouring Greenwich Park, Blackheath is the start point of the London Marathon. This maintains a connection with athletics dating back to the establishment of the Blackheath Harriers, now Blackheath and Bromley Harriers Athletic Club, in 1869. One of the Marathon start routes runs past the entrance to Blackheath High School for Girls, home of Blackheath Fencing Club.

There is a long history of kite flying on the heath.

== Geography ==
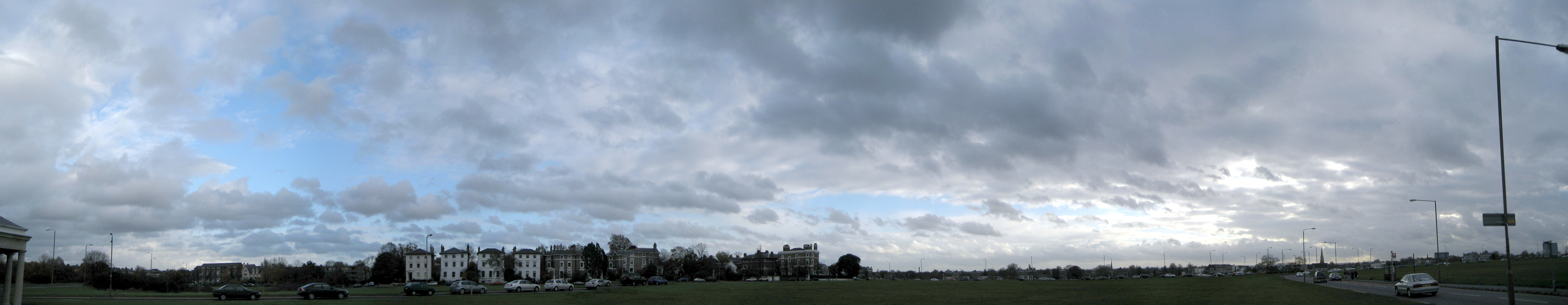
A panorama of the Blackheath heath

Blackheath is one of the largest areas of common land in Greater London, with 85.58 hectares (211.5 acres) of protected commons. The heath is managed by Lewisham and Greenwich councils. Highlights on the Greenwich side include the Long Pond, also known as Folly Pond, close to the main entrance of Greenwich Park.

On the Lewisham side are three ponds, with Hare and Billet pond the most natural, and probably the best wildlife habitat. Lewisham retains important areas of acid grassland that support locally rare wild plants such as Common stork's bill, Fiddle dock and Spotted medick. Key areas are to the east of Granville Park between South Row and Morden Row and on the cricket field east of Golfers Road.

The heath's habitat was well known to early botanists. In the 18th century Carl Linnaeus reportedly fell to his knees to thank God when he first saw the gorse growing there. However, this disputed account is more often attributed to Putney Heath. This environment supported both the flora and fauna of wild grassland. In 1859, Greenwich Natural History Society recorded a wide list of animal species, including natterjack toads, hares, common lizards, bats, quail, ring ouzel and nightingale. Today, bats remain and migrating ring ouzel may occasionally be seen in spring.

Extensive mineral extraction in the 18th and early 19th centuries, when gravel, sand and chalk were extracted left the heath transformed. This left large pits in many parts. In 1945 pits were filled with bomb rubble from World War II, then covered with topsoil and seeded with rye grass, leaving Vanbrugh Pits to the north-east side and Eliot Pits in the south-west. Infilled areas stand out, especially in late spring and early summer, from their deep-green rye grass.

== Politics and government ==
Blackheath is covered by the constituencies of Lewisham North, Greenwich and Woolwich and Eltham and Chislehurst for elections to the House of Commons of the United Kingdom.

Blackheath is part of the Blackheath Westcombe ward for elections to Greenwich Borough Council and Blackheath ward for elections to Lewisham Borough Council.

== Culture and community ==
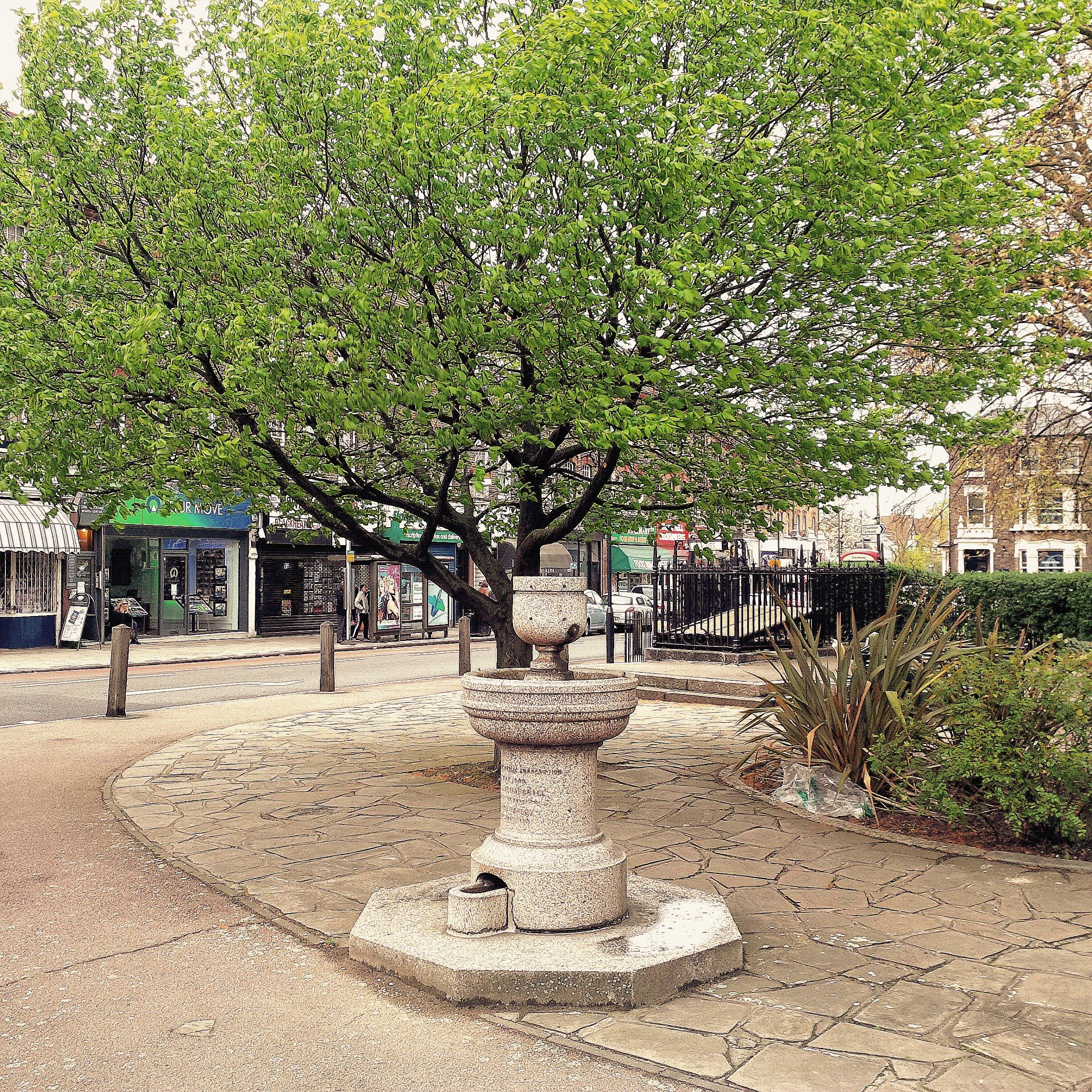
A memorial fountain on the south side of Batley Park in the Standard

Two clusters of amenities vie for retail and leisure: the "Village" around Blackheath railway station to the south of the heath and the "Standard" in the north of St Johns/Vanbrugh Park i.e. beyond the A2 road, named after the Royal Standard pub in Greenwich. The north of the green is in the Westcombe Park neighbourhood, which has its own railway station about 400 metres north – part of East Greenwich.

The total 0.35-hectare (0.9-acre) green and fountain sub-green was at first one village green, known during the 18th century as Sheepgate Green, beside a crossroads of what was the London-Dover road. Around 1885 local philanthropist William Fox Batley had it refurbished and it became known as Batley Green or Batley Park. Batley's contribution is recorded in an inscription on a memorial fountain.

Just south of the railway station is the Blackheath Conservatoire of Music and the Arts. It is located close to Blackheath Halls, a concert venue today owned and managed by Trinity Laban Conservatoire of Music and Dance. To the north of the railway station, in Tranquil Vale, All Saints' Parish Hall is a locally listed building in Arts and Crafts style, built in 1928. It has housed the Mary Evans Picture Library since 1988.

The heath was host to an annual fireworks display on the Saturday in November closest to Guy Fawkes Night. This was jointly organised and financed by the London Boroughs of Greenwich and Lewisham, but Greenwich Council withdrew its share of the funding in 2010. The event was suspended during the COVID-19 pandemic in 2020, and central government funding cuts forced further suspension from 2021.

In September 2014, the inaugural On Blackheath festival was hosted on the heath. The line-up included Massive Attack, Frank Turner and Grace Jones. The festival was repeated in September in 2015 (included Elbow, Madness and Manic Street Preachers), 2016 (included Primal Scream, James and Squeeze), 2017 (included The Libertines, Travis and Metronomy), and 2018 (included Squeeze, De La Soul and Paloma Faith) then moved to July in 2019 (included Jamiroquai, Grace Jones, Soul II Soul). The event was cancelled during the COVID-19 pandemic in 2020 and 2021. However, this event returned in 2025, continuing the tradition for years onward.

== Transport ==
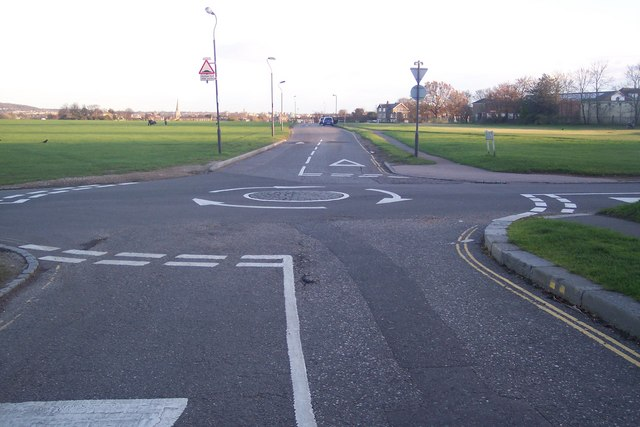
A roundabout on Wat Tyler Road, Blackheath Common

=== Rail ===
Blackheath station serves the area with National Rail services to London Victoria, London Charing Cross, London Cannon Street, Slade Green via Bexleyheath, Dartford via Bexleyheath or via Woolwich Arsenal and Gravesend.

Westcombe Park station also serves northern parts of Blackheath, with National Rail services to Luton via London Blackfriars, London Cannon Street, Barnehurst via Woolwich Arsenal, Crayford via Woolwich Arsenal and Rainham via Woolwich Arsenal.

=== Buses ===
Blackheath is served by London Buses routes 53, 54, 89, 108,178, 202, 286, 335, 380, 386, 422, SL4, N53 and N89. These connect it with areas including Bexleyheath, Bow, Canary Wharf, Catford, Charlton, Crystal Palace, Deptford, Elephant & Castle, Elmers End, Eltham, Greenwich, Kidbrooke, Lee, Lewisham, New Cross, Plumstead, North Greenwich, Sidcup, Slade Green, Stratford, Sydenham, Welling and Woolwich.

== See also ==
- List of people from Greenwich
- List of people from Lewisham
