= Intelligent street lighting =

Aspect of street lighting

Intelligent street lighting refers to public street lighting that adapts to movement by pedestrians, cyclists and cars in a smart city. Also called adaptive street lighting, it brightens when sensing activity and dims while not. This is different from traditional stationary illumination, and that which dims on a timer.

== History ==
=== Europe ===
The first patent requests for intelligent street lighting stem from the late 1990s. But it was not until April 7, 2006, that Europe experienced the first large scale implementation of a control network in a street lighting application. The implementation took place in Oslo (Norway) and it was expected to reduce energy usage by 50 percent, improve roadway safety, and minimize maintenance costs.

The Oslo project triggered interest from other cities in Europe, and formed the basis for other sustainability initiatives, such as the E-Street initiative. This research group focused on ways to reduce energy usage in outdoor lighting systems in the European Union (EU). The E-Street group strongly influenced EU standards and legislation for intelligent outdoor lighting systems.

== Actuality ==
=== Colombia ===
In Bogotá, the district government has proposed a large-scale intelligent street lighting system as part of its "Bogotá Capital Digital" strategy. The system, outlined in Project Agreement 767 presented to the City Council in 2025, aims to transform public lighting infrastructure into a multi-service technological platform using sensors and artificial intelligence (AI).

This system, using sensors, allows the brightness of the light bulbs to be adapted depending on factors such as location and time, in order to improve the quality of service, reduce energy consumption, and increase the perception of the environment.

== Features ==
Street lights can be made intelligent by placing cameras or other sensors on them, which enables them to detect movement (e.g. Sensity's Light Sensory Network, GE's "Currents", Tvilight's CitySense). Additional technology enables the street lights to communicate with one another. Different companies have different variations to this technology. When a passer-by is detected by a camera or sensor, it will communicate this to neighboring street lights, which will brighten so that people are always surrounded by a safe circle of light. The SmartLighting technology of the Anhalt University of Applied Sciences does this as well, and has been installed in Bernburg-Strenzfeld in Germany. Street lights illuminate at a longer distance ahead of the pedestrian than behind the pedestrian in the SmartLighting concept.

== Control ==
Some companies also offer software with which the street lights can be monitored and managed wirelessly. Clients, or other companies, can access the software from a computer, or even a tablet (smart street lighting management software). From this software, they can gather data, pre-set levels of brightness and dimming time; receive warning signals when a light defects.

== Guidelines ==
The U.S. Federal Highway Administration has issued guidelines to provide a process by which a governmental agency or a lighting designer can select the required lighting level for a road or street and implement adaptive lighting for a lighting installation or lighting retrofit.

== See also ==
- Street light interference phenomenon – Alleged anomalous phenomenon
