= No Māori Allowed =

- Directed by: Corinna Hunziker
- Produced by: Megan Jones; Reikura Kahi
- Cinematography: Dominic Fryer
- Edited by: Cushla Dillon
- Distributed by: TVNZ; Special Broadcasting Service; France Télévisions
- Release date: 18 October 2022
- Running time: 45 minutes
- Country: New Zealand
- Language: English

No Māori Allowed is a 2022 New Zealand documentary film directed by Corinna Hunziker and produced by Megan Jones and Reikura Kah. It explores Pukekohe's history of anti-Māori racism and racial segregation. It was based on American medical sociologist and University of Auckland senior lecturer Robert Bartholomew's 2020 book No Maori Allowed. It was released on TVNZ on 18 October 2022.

== Background ==
In 2020, American medical sociologist and University of Auckland senior lecturer Robert Bartholomew self-published his book No Maori Allowed: New Zealand's Forgotten History of Racial Segregation, which looked at the history of racial segregation and discrimination against Māori people in the Auckland suburb of Pukekohe.

During the early 20th century, several landless Māori from the Waikato migrated to Pukekohe to work in the township's market gardens as itinerant agricultural workers. Many of these Māori workers and their families lived in substandard accommodation including shacks and sheds, which contributed to an array of health problems and diseases among Pukekohe's Māori community. In his book, Bartholomew argued that 73% (237) of Māori deaths aged 14 years and under in Pukekohe between 1925 and 1961 were caused by preventable conditions linked to poverty and poor housing such as bronchitis, diphtheria, dysentry, gastroenteritis, malnutrition, measles, pneumonia, tuberculosis, and whooping cough. Bartholomew argued that the substandard housing of Māori workers and their families was the result of racially discriminatory policies practised by the Pukekohe Growers Association and local government leaders such as Deputy Mayor George Parvin and Mayor Max Grierson, who blocked efforts to establish public housing for Māori residents between the 1930s and 1960s.

In addition to substandard housing, Bartholomew argued that Pukekohe's Māori population experienced discrimination and segregation in accessing education, health services, bank loans, bus services, public toilets, transportation, and local businesses between the 1920s and early 1960s. In 1952, the segregated Māori-only Pukekohe Māori School was established for the Māori community. The school was later revamped in 1965 as the interracial Pukekohe Hill School. Bartholomew argued that anti-Māori discrimination was done on the pretext of health and alleged poor behaviour since New Zealand did not have legislation and local by-laws codifying racial segregation and discrimination.

Following the book's release, Bartholomew told Te Ao Māori News that he had trouble finding a publisher for No Maori Allowed. He said that a university publisher was open to publishing the book but requested changes because it was "too pro-Māori". Unwilling to make the changes, Bartholomew opted to self-publish the book. Bartholomew maintained that the stories of segregation needed to be told and New Zealand must "acknowledge its racist past". Bartholomew's research on Pukekohe has been cited by Adele N. Norris, Gauri Nandedkar, Meg Parsons and Byron Williams.

== Synopsis ==
No Māori Allowed explores the history of segregation and discrimination in Pukekohe including substandard housing and poor living conditions in the market gardens, and segregated access to facilities and services including schooling, the local cinema, and shops. The documentary features Māori elders Phyllis Bhana and Pare Rauwhero, teacher Catherine Tamihere, and Bartholomew. Bhana and Rauwhero share about their personal experiences with racism in Pukekohe while Bartholomew talks about raising awareness of the town's history through his book and public meetings. He joins forces with Tamihere, Bhana and Ruwhero to raise awareness of Pukekohe's history among its residents, secure a public apology from the Auckland Council.

== Production ==
No Māori Allowed was directed by Corinna Hunziker and produced by Megan Jones and Reikura Kahi. Dominic Fryer served as cinematographer while Cushla Dillon served as editor. The documentary's production was funded by TVNZ and NZ On Air.

Besides Bartholomew, the documentary makers also interviewed two female Māori kaumātua Phyllis Bhana and Pare Rauwhero, who shared about their experiences growing up in Pukekohe during the 20th century. The documentary supporters were also supported by a young Māori teacher named Catherine Tamihere, who had moved to Pukekohe and convinced the elders to share their stories as a means of healing.

According to Kahi, it "took a lot of strength, and a lot of talking to their whānau" (family) for Bhana and Rauwhero to tell Pukekohe's history of racial discrimination and segregation. While Bhana said that her whānau were initially critical of her participation in the documentary, she said that they subsequently supported her project as a means of educating the public about Pukekohe's history. Bhana also hoped that the documentary would encourage more people to "be brave and come forward with their stories." Bhana also worked with Bartholomew to brief teachers about Pukekohe's "colour bar." Rauwhero was initially reluctant to participate in the project due to her belief that only mana whenua (indigenous people) from Pukekohe had the right to tell that story.

According to Kahi, the documentary makers also encountered resistance from present-day residents of Pukekohe, who voiced their opposition against the project towards the film crew both in person and on social media. In response to opposition, Kahi defended the documentary project as a means of tackling a "heavy subject" and initiating a healing process. She also expressed hope that Pukekohe's history of racism and segregation would become part of the New Zealand school history curriculum.

== Release ==
The film was released on TVNZ 1 and the streaming service TVNZ+ on 18 October 2022. It was also distributed by the Australian Special Broadcasting Service and France Télévisions.

== Reception ==
=== Critical reception ===
In late September 2023, No Māori Allowed won the Grand Jury Prize at the FIFO film festival in Tahiti, Best Documentary at the New Zealand Television Awards, Pacifica Award for Best Feature Film at the Hawaii International Film Festival and Best Documentary Short at the Dili International Film Festival. The film was shortlisted for the imagineNATIVE Film and Media Arts Festival in Toronto and Rochefort Pacific Cinema & Literature Festival in October 2023.

Shannon Pōmaika'i Hennessey of "Film For Thought" praised the documentary's director Corinna Hunziker for tackling the question of "who has the right to tell the story" within the context of indigenous storytelling. In discussing the role of the documentary's participants Robert Bartholomew, Catherine Tamihere and Pare Rauwhero, Hennessey said that Hunziker challenged viewers to consider their privilege in relation to community and sensitive histories. She praised No Māori Allowed for allowing the Māori elders to share their stories on their own terms.

=== Community responses ===
Following the documentary's release, Phyllis Bhana embarked on a campaign to acknowledge the unmarked graves of the 200 children at the Pukekohe Public Cemetery. She also led a campaign to lobby for a public apology for the discrimination and abuse that Māori living in Pukekohe had experienced. In May 2023, Newshub reported that the Auckland Council was working with the New Zealand Government to issue a formal apology to Māori families affected by racial discrimination and segregation in Pukekohe. By October 2023, the New Zealand Government had allocated NZ$700,000 to build a memorial at the Pukekohe cemetery to honour those buried without headstones.
