= Robert Bartholomew =

American medical sociologist (born 1958)

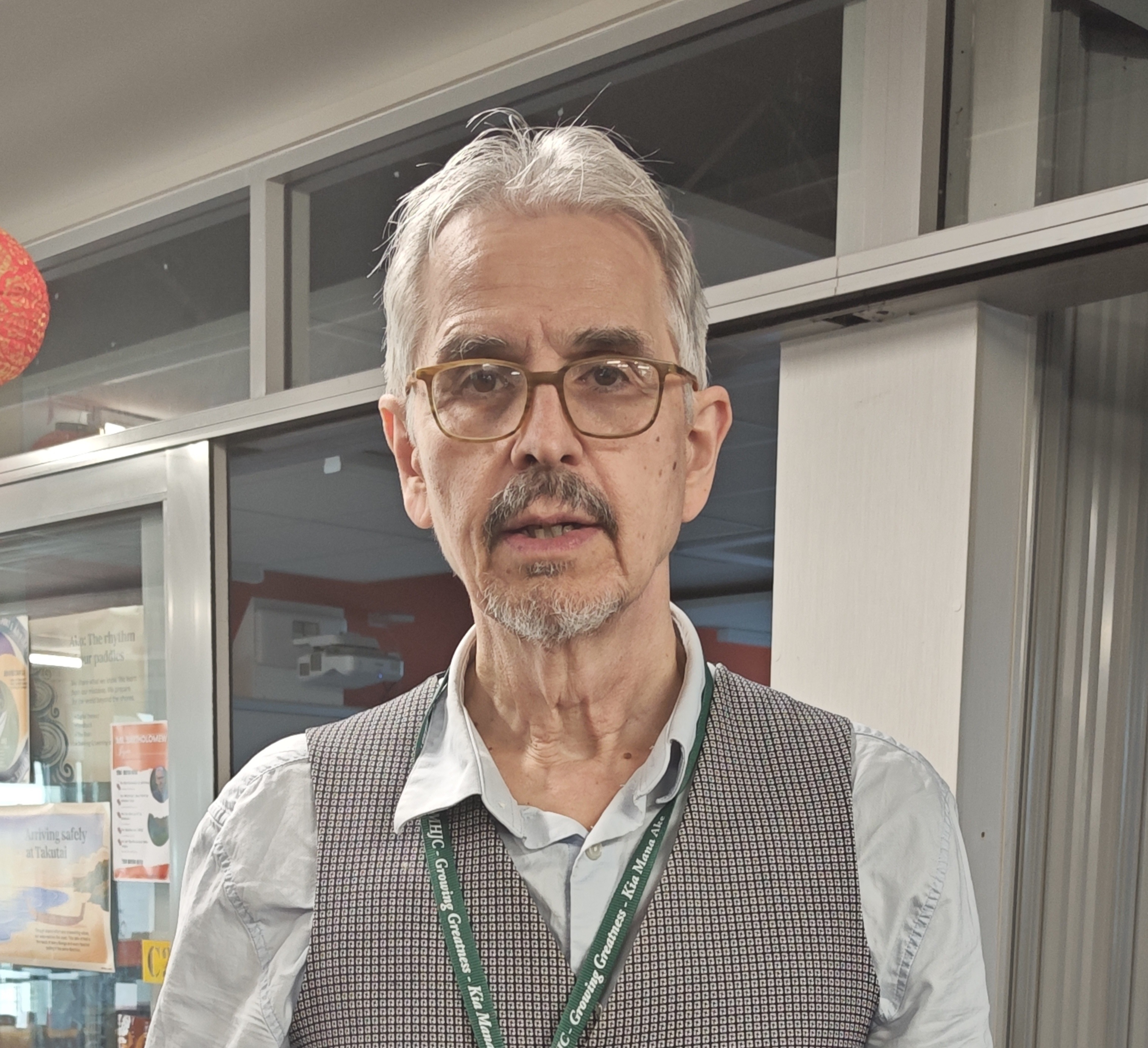
- Bartholomew in 2026
- Born: August 17, 1958 (age 68)
- Education: State University of New York; Flinders University; James Cook University
- Occupations: Medical sociologist, writer, teacher
- Years active: 1984–present
- Employer(s): Mission Heights Junior College, Auckland, New Zealand
- Website: rebartholomew.com

Robert Emerson Bartholomew (born August 17, 1958) is an American medical sociologist, journalist and author living in New Zealand. He is an Honorary Senior Lecturer in the Department of Psychological Medicine at the University of Auckland in New Zealand. He writes for several newspapers and journals on sociological and fringe science topics, including Psychology Today, Skeptical Inquirer, and British magazines The Skeptic and Fortean Times.

== Education ==
Bartholomew first obtained a radio broadcasting certificate studying at SUNY Adirondack in 1977 followed in 1979 by a bachelor's degree in communications at Plattsburgh. By 1984 he had been awarded a master's degree in American sociology at State University of New York. In 1992 he gained a masters in Australian sociology from Flinders University in Adelaide, South Australia followed by a doctorate in sociology from James Cook University in Queensland, Australia. Finally, in 2001 he gained his teaching qualification from Upper Valley Teachers Institute in social studies.

== Academic work ==
Bartholomew has also lived and worked in Malaysia and in 2009 worked in sociology at International University College of Technology. In April 2010 he took up a teaching position at Botany Downs Secondary College in Auckland, New Zealand. He is currently an Honorary Senior Lecturer in the Department of Psychological Medicine at the University of Auckland in New Zealand.

In 2012, Bartholomew published Australia's forgotten children: The corrupt state of education in the Northern Territory: A case study of educational apartheid at an aboriginal pretend school in which he uncovered human rights abuses of indigenous Australian aboriginal children who were being exposed to harmful asbestos in the Northern Territory with the knowledge of the Northern Territory Department of Education.

Bartholomew's principal area of academic contribution is in the field of mass psychogenic illness, previously known as mass hysteria, both historical and present day cases, an area he has been studying for over 25 years. He has written extensively about 600 notable instances including the Salem witch trials, the 2011 Le Roy illness, which Bartholomew has described as "the first case of this magnitude to occur in the U.S. during the social networking era", and present-day manifestations, most of which he has said have yet to be studied in-depth by sociologists.

As we enter the 21st century, epidemic hysteria will again mirror the times, likely thriving on the fear and uncertainty from terrorist threats and environmental concerns. What new forms it will take and when these changes will appear are beyond our capacity to predict.

In 2016, Bartholomew investigated the 2012 case of an outbreak of hiccups in Danvers, Massachusetts (originally Old Salem village), in which 24 young people were stricken with apparently uncontrollable hiccups. After requesting and reviewing state documents from the original investigation, he concluded the most likely explanation was a psychogenic conversion disorder affecting the (predominantly) girls involved. He publicly stated the Massachusetts Department of Public Health had "knowingly issued an inaccurate, incomplete report...They have an obligation to issue accurate diagnoses, and patients have a right to know what made them sick" and filed official complaints of malpractice.

Bartholomew has also drawn attention to the role of the internet in acting as an "echo chamber" for spreading moral outrage; for example on social media, pedophile allegations used as political weapons by supporters of the far right against liberal celebrities, which mirrors earlier public outrage which took the form of the Red Scare (particularly McCarthyism) and the Lavender scare against homosexuals in US government positions.

Bartholomew is frequently interviewed as an expert on topics as diverse as the "Pokémon Panic" of 1997, the spread of UFO conspiracy theories, the 2016 clown panic (which he suggested was a moral panic fueled by social media in response to a fear of strangers and terrorism), the viral spread of online fads such as Pokémon Go, and Havana syndrome, the suspected energy weapon attacks against American and Canadian government personnel which began in 2016, about which he said:

I am convinced that we are dealing with an episode of mass psychogenic illness and mass suggestion. If these same symptoms were reported among a group of factory workers in New York or London, I think you would get a very different diagnosis, and there would be no consideration to a sonic weapon hypothesis. There is also another possibility to consider here: government officials trying to defend their initial diagnosis.

In 2020, Bartholomew co-authored Havana Syndrome: Mass Psychogenic Illness and the Real Story Behind the Embassy Mystery and Hysteria, a book on the sonic attack controversy in Cuba, with Professor Robert W. Baloh, a neurologist at the UCLA Medical Center. The book document dozens of similar examples of disorders that have essentially the same features as "Havana Syndrome", but were given different labels, from the 18th century belief that sounds from certain musical instruments were harmful to human health, to contemporary panics involving people living near wind turbines. In March 2020, Bartholomew was invited to attend a medical conference in Havana, Cuba, on the "attacks", where he repeated the claim that stress-induced mass psychogenic illness was the most likely cause.

In 2020, Bartholomew's self-published No Māori Allowed: New Zealand's Forgotten History of Racial Segregation, which looked at the history of segregation and discrimination against Māori people in the Auckland suburb of Pukekohe. His research found that 73% (237) of all Māori deaths aged 14 years and under in Pukekohe between 1925 and 1961 were caused by preventable conditions linked to poverty and poor housing such as bronchitis, diphtheria, dysentry, gastroenteritis, malnutrition, measles, pneumonia, tuberculosis, and whooping cough. On 19 June 2020, Bartholomew told Te Ao Maori News that a publisher had said his book No Māori Allowed was too pro-Maori. Bartholomew maintained that the stories of segregation needed to be told and New Zealand must '"acknowledge its racist past." In 2022, Bartholomew's book was adapted into a TVNZ documentary called No Māori Allowed by Megan Jones, Reikura Kahi and Corinna Hunzike. Bartholomew's research on Pukekohe has been cited by Adele N. Norris, Gauri Nandedkar, Meg Parsons and Byron Williams.

== Views and positions ==
Bartholomew has expressed concern about the promotion of indigenous science practices such Māori cultural beliefs about the lunar calendar into public health policy and practices. He has described proposals to incorporate the Māori lunar calendar into healthcare and horticulture as akin to pseudoscience such as astrology. Bartholomew has also defended the seven scientists who authored the 2021 Listener letter on science.

== Publications ==
=== Academic papers ===
Bartholomew's publications include:

- Protean nature of mass sociogenic illness (2002) with Simon Wessely, British Journal of Psychiatry
- A social-psychological theory of collective anxiety attacks: the "Mad Gasser" reexamined (2004) with Jeffrey S. Victor, Sociological Quarterly
- Epidemic Hysteria in Schools: an international and historical overview (2006) with Francois Sirois, Educational Studies
- How Should Mental Health Professionals Respond to Outbreaks of Mass Psychogenic Illness? (2011) with M. Chandra Sekaran Muniratnam, Journal of Cognitive Psychotherapy
- Mass psychogenic illness and the social network: is it changing the pattern of outbreaks? (2012) with G. James Rubin and Simon Wessely, Journal of the Royal Society of Medicine
- Science for sale: the rise of predatory journals (2014), Journal of the Royal Society of Medicine

=== Books ===
Bartholomew is the author of several popular science and skeptical non-fiction books including:

- UFOs & Alien Contact: Two Centuries of Mystery (1998) with George S. Howard
- Exotic Deviance: Medicalizing Cultural Idioms (2000)
- Little Green Men, Meowing Nuns and Head-Hunting Panics: A Study of Mass Psychogenic Illness and Social Delusion (2001)
- Hoaxes, Myths, and Manias: Why We Need Critical Thinking (2003) with Benjamin Radford
- Panic Attacks (2004) with Hilary Evans
- Bigfoot Encounters in New York & New England: Documented Evidence Stranger Than Fiction (2008) with Paul B. Bartholomew
- Outbreak! The Encyclopedia of Extraordinary Social Behavior (2009) with Hilary Evans
- The Martians Have Landed!: A History of Media-Driven Panics and Hoaxes (2012) with Benjamin Radford
- Australia's Forgotten Children: The Corrupt State of Education in the Northern Territory (2012)
- The Untold Story of Champ: A Social History of America's Loch Ness Monster (2012)
- Mass Hysteria in Schools: A Worldwide History Since 1566 (2014) with Bob Rickard
- A Colorful History of Popular Delusions (2015) with Peter Hassall
- American Hauntings: The True Stories behind Hollywood's Scariest Movies―from The Exorcist to The Conjuring (2015) with Joe Nickell
- American Intolerance: Our Dark History of Demonizing Immigrants (2019) with Anja E. Reumschüssel
- Havana Syndrome: Mass Psychogenic Illness and the Real Story Behind the Embassy Mystery and Hysteria (2020) with Robert W. Baloh
- No Māori Allowed: New Zealand's forgotten history of racial segregation (2020).

==== Reception ====
William Gibson in Mother Jones described Outbreak! The Encyclopedia of Extraordinary Social Behavior as "Essential reading for the era of Trump" while Véronique Campion-Vincent described it as "exceptional in its scope...an indispensable working tool for researchers". Michael Bywater in The Daily Telegraph described Panic Attacks as "a revealing historical corrective to the tempting view that media manipulation is a late-20th-century invention."

An October 2021 article published by the Office for Science and Society of McGill University, which was critical of the official claims about Havana Syndrome, referred readers to Havana Syndrome: Mass Psychogenic Illness and the Real Story Behind the Embassy Mystery and Hysteria as a "fantastic book" saying it contextualize the syndrome in a history of acoustical scares, PTSD, and unwarranted accusations of state terrorism."

== Recognition ==
In 2017, Bartholomew was elected a Fellow of the Committee for Skeptical Inquiry.

== See also ==
- Dancing mania
- Hysterical contagion
- Seattle windshield pitting epidemic
