= Strange but True? =

British television series (1993–1997)

- Genre: Paranormal documentary
- Presented by: Michael Aspel
- Country of origin: United Kingdom
- Original language: English
- No. of series: 4
- No. of episodes: 39

Production
- Running time: 30 minutes (inc. adverts); 90 minutes (live special)
- Production company: LWT

Original release
- Network: ITV
- Release: 21 May 1993 – 7 November 1997

Strange but True? is a paranormal documentary television show that aired on ITV for four seasons, from 21 May 1993 to 7 November 1997 and was hosted by Michael Aspel.

== Premise ==
The series explored a number of aspects of unexplained activity, from ghosts and poltergeists, to near-death experiences, vampires and aliens. The series involved filmed reconstructions of classic cases with actors and interviews with the original participants and researchers in each event. Story consultant for all episodes was paranormal researcher Jenny Randles.

== Episodes ==
=== Pilot (1993) ===
No.	Title	Original release date
1	"UFO Sightings (Alan Godfrey/Todmorden, West Yorkshire 28 November 1980 abduction)"	21 May 1993
1	"Reincarnation"	21 May 1993

=== Series 1 (1994) ===
No. overall	No. in series	Title	Original release date
2	1	"Chris Robinson's Premonitions"	28 October 1994
2	1	"Pete the Poltergeist"	28 October 1994
3	2	"Bonnybridge"	4 November 1994
3	2	"Robert Taylor Incident"	4 November 1994
3	2	"Painless Penny"	4 November 1994
4	3	"Dover Castle"	11 November 1994
4	3	"Lorraine Ham – The Psychic Healer"	11 November 1994
5	4	"Nella Jones – Crime Solving Psychic"	18 November 1994
5	4	"Millboro (Past Lives)"	18 November 1994
6	5	"Heaven and Back (Near Death Experiences)"	25 November 1994
6	5	"Borley Rectory"	25 November 1994
7	6	"Stocksbridge Bypass"	2 December 1994
7	6	"Angels"	2 December 1994
8	7	"The Rendlesham Incident"	9 December 1994

=== Series 2 (1995) ===
No. overall	No. in series	Title	Original release date
9	1	"Faith Healer"	8 September 1995
9	1	"Past Memories"	8 September 1995
10	2	"Time Slip"	15 September 1995
10	2	"Haunted Trawler"	15 September 1995
11	3	"Pet Healers"	22 September 1995
11	3	"Muncaster Castle"	22 September 1995
12	4	"Miracles"	29 September 1995
13	5	"Cursed Stone"	6 October 1995
13	5	"Phantom Hitch Hiker"	6 October 1995
14	6	"Dowsing"	13 October 1995
14	6	"Near Death Experience"	13 October 1995
15	7	"Enfield Poltergeist"	20 October 1995
16	8	"The Jim Twins"	27 October 1995
16	8	"Flitwick Ghost"	27 October 1995
17	9	"Etta Smith"	3 November 1995
18	10	"UFOs – Pilots"	10 November 1995
18	10	"UFOs – Kaikoura Lights"	10 November 1995

=== Series 3 (1996) ===
No. overall	No. in series	Title	Original release date
19	1	"Venetian Palace Incident"	30 August 1996
20	2	"Cornish Sea Monster"	6 September 1996
20	2	"Exorcist's Story"	6 September 1996
21	3	"Past life"	13 September 1996
21	3	"Pluckley – The Most Haunted Village in England"	13 September 1996
22	4	"Gulf Breeze UFO Incident"	20 September 1996
23	5	"Paranormal on Camera"	27 September 1996
23	5	"Ghost Planes of the Peaks"	27 September 1996
24	6	"Chingle Hall"	4 October 1996
24	6	"Psychic Detective: Part 1"	4 October 1996
25	7	"Psychic Detective Parts 2 and 3"	11 October 1996
26	8	"Life Beyond Death"	18 October 1996
26	8	"The Haunted Bomber"	18 October 1996
27	9	"Alien Abduction"	25 October 1996
28	10	"Psychic Pets"	1 November 1996
28	10	"The Mystery of Dark Peak"	1 November 1996

=== Special (1997) ===
No. overall	Title	Original release date
29	"Live Special"	27 June 1997

=== Series 4 (1997) ===
No. overall	No. in series	Title	Original release date
30	1	"Paranormal on Camera"	5 September 1997
30	1	"Twin Co-Incidences"	5 September 1997
31	2	"Littlecote House"	12 September 1997
31	2	"Skiers on Bavarian Alps"	12 September 1997
32	3	"Remote Viewing (David Morehouse)"	19 September 1997
33	4	"The Falkirk Triangle"	26 September 1997
33	4	"Beast of Durham – The Fishburn Puma"	26 September 1997
34	5	"John Raphael (Past Life)"	3 October 1997
34	5	"Premonitions"	3 October 1997
35	6	"The Curse of Tutankhamun"	10 October 1997
36	7	"Lucid Dreams"	17 October 1997
36	7	"Psychic Children"	17 October 1997
37	8	"Bigfoot"	24 October 1997
37	8	"Ouija Boards"	24 October 1997
38	9	"The Galway Poltergeist"	31 October 1997
39	10	"Andrew Green the Ghostbuster/Psychic Pets"	7 November 1997
