= Jenny Randles =

British ufologist

- Born: 30 October 1951 (age 75); Bacup, Lancashire, England, United Kingdom
- Occupation: Author

Jenny Randles (born 30 October 1951) is a British author and former director of investigations with the British UFO Research Association (BUFORA), serving in that role from 1982 through to 1994. She has authored numerous books about UFOs and other paranormal phenomena and is one of the founders of the Association for the Scientific Study of Anomalous Phenomena.

== Career ==
Jenny Randles was the former director of investigations with the British UFO Research Association (BUFORA), serving in that role from 1982 through to 1994. Randles is a columnist for the magazine Fortean Times. She is the editor of Northern UFO News. Randles has written several books on UFOs and paranormal phenomena. Subjects covered include crop circles, ESP, and spontaneous human combustion. She was a proponent of spontaneous human combustion, a pseudoscientific claim which scientists consider extremely implausible. She coauthored a book on human combustion, Spontaneous Human Combustion, with Peter Hough, as well books with him on afterlife phenomena, including Death by Supernatural Causes and The Afterlife.

On the eve of the publishing of her second book on UFO's in 1981, Randles was working as a writer for Flying Saucer Review. The reporter for the Evening Standard writes that she started out with a belief that "intelligent beings from other worlds" were visiting Earth, but changed her mind that nine out of ten are "perfectly ordinary explanation(s)" and the more "colourful contact-cases 'emerge from the psyche of the percipient'".

Randles investigated the Rendlesham Forest UFO case and was one of the first to do so, coauthoring the book Sky Crash: A Cosmic Conspiracy shortly after it happened. She subsequently became skeptical of that case's veracity and that it had anything to do with aliens, but her earlier claims contributed to some of the conspiracy that grew around it. She later stated of Rendlesham that "While some puzzles remain, we can probably say that no unearthly craft were seen in Rendlesham Forest. We can also argue with confidence that the main focus of the events was a series of misperceptions of everyday things encountered in less than everyday circumstances".

Other books on UFOs she has authored include UFO Retrievals, UFOs and How to See Them, World's Best "True" UFO Stories, and Science and the UFOs with amateur astronomer Peter Warrington. The latter book argues ufology has many failings and advocates for proper scientific investigation of them without sensationalism, but argues there is legitimacy behind some sightings. She argues claimed UFO abductions do not actually involve extraterrestrials, and rather that "under hypnosis witnesses relive a genuine trauma" reconfigured to UFO belief. She believes many UFO sightings are legitimate, and possibly are atmospheric phenomena. Between 1993 and 1997 she worked on the dramatized documentary series Strange but True? which featured many cases from around the world. In a 1986 review of a book she coauthored with amateur astronomer Peter Warrington, Science and the UFOs, reviewer Philip Taylor described Randles as then being the "most well-known British 'UFOlogist'", and Skeptical Inquirer described her as a "respected ufologist".

Writing for Science and Public Policy David Bell reviews Alien Contact; the First Fifty Years as a chronological review of UFO sightings up to 1997 when her book was published. Bell states that it "is a fascinating record of ... of what? Depending on your perspective" it can mean "human encounters" with UFO's, a myth, or gullibility. Alien Contact is "little more than 'the facts', from which we might forge our own version of 'the truth'". The Manchester Evening News also reviewing Alien Contact writes books "that excite the believer and baffle the sceptic" but the gives the "cool, detached, strictly terrestrial explanation of what very likely happened." At the time of this review, Randles had published 35 books on UFO's and the Evening News recognizes her as "the acknowledged British literary expert" on UFO's.

The Skeptic magazine reviewer Paul Taylor criticized Randle's 2008 book, Time Storms: The Amazing Evidence of Time Warps, Space Rifts and Time Travel for its extraordinary claims being sourced to difficult to check UFO publications, personal interviews and correspondence, saying, "Among all the could-be’s and perhaps’s, the author doesn’t seem to know either. Nevertheless, she tries to convince us that time warps and time travel not only are possible, but are everyday phenomena. It could be I don’t believe a word she says".

The Independent reviewed her presentation of the first episode of the 1996 BBC television series, Secrets of the Paranormal. Writer Thomas Sutcliffe noted that "she pursued her investigations with a passable simulation of scholarship", however "what followed demonstrated yet again how malleable the logic of UFO devotees can be - a sort of mental Plasticine out of which monsters are moulded". The Manchester Evening News also reviewed the BBC series, saying that Randles tracked down official files and got the Ministry of Defence to admit that they remain "'totally open-minded'".

Investigator Joe Nickell writing for Skeptical Inquirer stated that the book The Afterlife which was co-written by Randles and Peter Hough tells the story of a dying man seeing a "long-lost friend" in the last moments of death. Nickell says that the authors created a story of what they thought might be happening, but have no evidence of this "friend" actually being in the room, instead what they describe is a near death experience (NDE) with a lack of oxygen going to the brain, causing the dying person to hallucinate. The authors claim according to Nickell is uncritical and "anecdotal evidence".

She coined the term "The Oz Factor" to refer to the feeling of having been transported to a similar world or environment but with noticeable differences present.

== Personal life ==
Randles was born in Bacup, a town in the Borough of Rossendale in Lancashire, England, on 30 October 1951. She studied chemistry, mathematics, and physics at university. She worked as a teacher in Cheshire, but quit to study UFOs.

She is a post-surgical transgender woman and has written about her experience frequently on Twitter. She transitioned in 1973 at age 22 and had gender-affirming surgery in 1976. She was going to be outed in 1996 while working on a television production and subsequently revealed her status to her coworkers. She self-describes as a transsexual.

== Bibliography ==
- —— (2005). Breaking the Time Barrier: The Race to Build the First Time Machine. Simon & Schuster.
- —— (2003). Supernatural Isle of Man. Robert Hale.
- —— (2003). Supernatural Pennines. Robert Hale.
- —— (2001). Time Storms: The Amazing Evidence of Time Warps, Space Rifts and Time Travel. Piatkus.
- ——; Peter Hough (2001). Psychic Detectives: The Mysterious Use of Paranormal Phenomena in Solving True Crimes. Reader's Digest. ISBN 9780762103294.
- ——; Andy Roberts; David Clarke (2000). The UFOs That Never Were. London House. ISBN 1902809351.
- —— (2000). Little Giant Encyclopedia of UFOs. Sterling Pub.
- —— (2000). Supernatural Causes: Case Studies of Mysterious Death and Injury. London House.
- —— (1999). The Complete Book Aliens and Abductions. Piatkus.
- —— (1999). UFO! Danger in the Air. Sterling Pub.
- —— (1998). Truly Weird: Real-life Cases of the Paranormal. Collins & Brown.
- —— (1998). UFO Crash Landing? Friend or Foe?: The Full Story of the Rendlesham Forest Close Encounter. Blandford.
- —— (1998). Something in the Air. Robert Hale.
- —— (1997). Men in Black: Investigating the Truth Behind the Phenomenon. Piatkus.
- —— (1997). Alien Contact: The First Fifty Years. Barnes & Noble. ISBN 9780760705452.
- ——; Peter A. Hough (1997). The Complete Book of UFOs: 50 Years of Alien Contacts and Encounters. Piatkus.
- —— (1997). The Paranormal Source Book: The Comprehensive Guide to Strange Phenomena worldwide. Piatkus.
- —— (1997). The Truth Behind Men in Black: Government Agents, or Visitors from Beyond. St. Martin's Press. ISBN 9780312965211.
- —— (1996). Life After Death and the World Beyond: Investigating Heaven and the Spiritual Dimension. Piatkus.
- —— (1995). UFO Retrievals: The Recovery of Alien Spacecraft. Blandford. ISBN 0713724935.
- —— (1995). Strange but True Casebook. Piatkus. ISBN 0749915587.
- ——; Peter Hough (1994). Strange but True?. Piatkus. ISBN 0749914599.
- —— (1994). Alien Contacts and Abductions: The Real Story from the Other Side. Sterling.
- —— (1994). The Unexplained: Great Mysteries of the 20th Century. Anaya.
- —— (1994). Strange and Unexplained Mysteries of the 20th Century. Sterling Pub. ISBN 9780806907680.
- —— (1994). World's Best "True" UFO Stories. Sterling Pub. Co.
- —— (1994). Star Children: The True Story of Alien Offspring Among Us. Hale.
- ——; Peter A. Hough (1994). The Complete Book of UFOs: The Investigation into Alien Contacts and Encounters. Piatkus.
- —— (1994). Time Travel: Fact, Fiction and Possibility. Blandford.
- ——; Peter A. Hough (1993). Encyclopedia of the Unexplained. Blitz Editions.
- —— (1993). Aliens: The Real Story. Hale.
- —— (1993). The Paranormal Year. Robert Hale.
- ——; Peter Hough (1993). Mysteries Of The Mersey Valley. Sigma Leisure.
- ——; Peter Hough (1993). The Afterlife: An Investigation into the Mysteries of Life After Death. Piatkus.
- —— (1992). UFOs and How to See Them. Barnes & Noble.
- ——; Peter A. Hough (1992). Spontaneous Human Combustion. Hale.
- —— (1991). From Out of the Blue: The Incredible UFO Cover-Up at Bentwaters NATO Air Base. Global Communications.
- ——; Paul Fuller (1990). Crop Circles: A Mystery Solved. Hale.
- —— (1990). Mind Monsters: Invaders from Inner Space?. Aquarian.
- —— (1989). Phantoms of the Soap Operas. Hale.
- ——; Peter Hough (1988). Death By Supernatural Causes?. Grafton.
- —— (1988). Alien Abductions: the Mystery Solved: Over 200 Documented UFO Kidnappings Investigated. Inner Light Publications.
- —— (1988). Abduction: Scientific Exploration of Alleged Kidnaps by Alien Beings. Headline.
- —— (1987). UFO Conspiracy: From the Official Case Files of the World's Leading Nations. Barnes & Noble. ISBN 1566191955.
- —— (1987). Sixth Sense: Psychic Powers and Your Five Senses. Hale.
- —— (1987). The UFO Conspiracy: The First Forty Years. Blandford.
- ——; Peter Warrington (1985). Science and the UFOs. B. Blackwell.
- —— (1985). Beyond Explanation? The Paranormal Experiences of Famous People. Hale.
- ——; Brenda Butler; Dot Street (1984). Sky Crash: A Cosmic Conspiracy. Neville Spearman.
- —— (1983). The Pennine UFO Mystery. Granada.
- —— (1983). UFO Reality: A Critical Look at the Physical Evidence. Hale.
- —— (1981). UFO Study: A Handbook for Enthusiasts. Robert Hale.
- ——; Paul Whetnall (1981). Alien Contact: Window on Another World. Spearman.
- ——; Peter Warrington (1979). UFOs: A British Viewpoint. Hale.
