= Association for the Scientific Study of Anomalous Phenomena =

United Kingdom-based learned society

- Founded: 10 June 1981
- Founder: Hugh Pincott; Vernon Harrison; Bob Rickard; Jenny Randles; Hilary Evans
- Purpose: Investigate paranormal phenomena
- Location: UK
- Region served: United Kingdom
- Chair: Vacant
- Treasurer: Vacant
- Secretary: Vacant
- Key people: Lionel Fanthorpe; Michael Bentine
- Revenue: £11,943
- Volunteers: 500
- Website: www.assap.ac.uk

The Association for the Scientific Study of Anomalous Phenomena (ASSAP) is a United Kingdom-based learned society, education and research charity, dedicated to scientifically investigate alleged paranormal and anomalous phenomena, with a view to approaching the subject in its entirety rather than looking into the psychology of individual phenomenon. They also hold training days for would-be investigators and provide research grants.

ASSAP's refusal to accept populist explanations for ghosts and its focus on recording of experience rather than phenomena has garnered cautious praise from skeptics. The first part of their investigative process, which is used to detect obvious fraud, is kept a secret from the public.

== History ==
The ASSAP was founded on 10 June 1981 by council members of the Society for Psychical Research who were modernisers; its current president is Lionel Fanthorpe. The previous president was Michael Bentine who had a long-term interest in the subject of the paranormal.

Founding members included well-known authors Hilary Evans and Jenny Randles as well as Fortean Times editor Bob Rickard, Vernon Harrison and Hugh Pincott (previously secretary and treasurer of the Society for Psychical Research).

The charity has had sub-committees such as the Circles Research Program, who investigated crop circles. In the 1990s, they held an average of 1,000 investigations a year.

== Current activities ==
Members receive the annual peer reviewed journal Anomaly and a bi-annual magazine, as well as invitations to a weekly Thursday evening webinar series where experts discuss anomalous phenomena and borderline science. The tone of the group is skeptical and scientific but it holds no corporate beliefs and instead embraces a Fortean openness to anomalies of all kinds. Members have unlimited use of the Mary Evans picture library because Hilary Evans was one of the founders.

Carrie Searley explained to paranormal researcher Ben Radford that "fake ghost photography is in the minority, however, it does occur...It is purely down to us to educate ourselves with the up and coming new photo apps that are being offered on the market". ASSAP asked the public for its help to catalogue the known fake images for smartphones. Though the charity still analyses ghostly photographs, in 2011 it ceased to study smartphone pictures, as apps became available for the specific purpose of faking ghostly figures. The charity asked members to send before and after pictures using the applications to help weed out fakes.

In 2013 the organisation staged a one-day "Summit on the Future of Ufology", stating that a possible crisis in the world of UFO researchers, as well as recent sightings, required examination. They held a similar conference in 2012 at the University of Worcester. They had earlier hosted the Paranormal Olympics at the University of London.

Since 2006 the charity launched Project Albion, creating a database with the goal of recording every Fortean event in the country.

== Chairs ==
| Start Year | End Year | Chair |
|---|---|---|
| 1981 | 1982 | Alan Hughes |
| 1983 | 1997 | Maurice Townsend |
| 1997 | 2001 | Phil Walton |
| 2001 | 2002 | Hugh Pincott |
| 2002 | 2006 | Mike White |
| 2006 | 2014 | Dave Wood |
| 2015 | 2016 | Sarah Spellman |
| 2016 | 2017 | Ian Topham |
| 2017 | 2019 | Dave Wood |
| 2019 | 2024 | Chris Jensen Romer |
