= Hilary Evans =

British pictorial archivist and parapsychologist

Hilary & Mary Evans

Hilary Agard Evans (6 March 1929 – 27 July 2011) was a British pictorial archivist, author, and researcher into UFOs and other paranormal phenomena.

== Biography ==
Evans was born in Shrewsbury, Shropshire, United Kingdom and educated at St George's School at Harpenden. Following national service in Palestine, he went up to King's College, Cambridge, to read English, followed by a Master's at Birmingham University. He then spent some time as a private tutor before joining Mather & Crowther advertising agency as a copywriter in 1953.

In 1964, he and his wife Mary Evans (1936–2010) founded the Mary Evans Picture Library, an archive of historical illustrations. In 1981, he co-founded the Association for the Scientific Study of Anomalous Phenomena. Evans was an exponent of the Psychosocial Hypothesis of UFOs as culturally shaped visionary experiences.

== Books published ==
- Harlots, Whores & Hookers: A History of Prostitution. Taplinger, 1979.
- Intrusions: Society and the Paranormal. London and Boston: Routledge & Kegan Paul, 1982.
- The Evidence for UFOs. Wellingborough, Northampton, England: Aquarian Press, 1983.
- Visions, Apparitions, Alien Visitors. Wellingborough, Northampton, England: Aquarian Press, 1984.
- Gods, Spirits, Cosmic Guardians. Wellingborough, Northampton: Aquarian Press, 1987.
- Evans, Hilary, and Spencer, John, eds. UFOs, 1947–1987: The 40-year Search for an Explanation, Fortean Times, 1987.
- Alternate States of Consciousness: Unself, Other-self, and Superself. Wellingborough, Northampton: Aquarian Press, 1989.
- Frontiers of Reality, Aquarian Press, 1989.
- Evans, Hilary, and Spencer, John, eds. Phenomena: Forty Years of Flying Saucers, New York: Avon Books, 1989.
- Evans, Hilary, and Stacy, Dennis, eds. UFO 1947–1997: Fifty Years of Flying Saucers, London: John Brown, 1997.
- Evans, Hilary, and Bartholomew, Robert, eds. Outbreak! The Encyclopedia of Extraordinary Social Behaviour, San Antonio, Texas: Anomalist Books, 2009.
- Evans, Hilary SLIders: The Enigma of Streetlight Interference, San Antonio, Texas: Anomalist Books, 2010.

=== Reception ===
Evan's Harlots, Whores & Hookers: A History of Prostitution (1979), was criticized by historian Vern Bullough as an "anecdotal collection of incidents, some true, some not so true, with little analysis of the sources from which they came and even less understanding of the historical forces."

Sceptical researcher Philip J. Klass described Evans one of the "best informed and more sensible of the pro-UFOlogists." Klass however, found it "regrettable" that Evans was the editor of the anthology UFOs, 1947–1987 published by the Fortean Times. According to Klass the book is unreliable and filled with pseudoscientific claims.

Christopher Scott in the New Scientist criticized Evans for his lack of scientific understanding. Scott noted that Evans was heavily biased and credulous for accepting reports of paranormal phenomena at face value. Evans in Intrusions (1982) had presented a photograph of the medium Eusapia Palladino allegedly levitating a table "without trickery", but her hands or feet were not visible, nor two of the legs of the table. Scott concluded that Evans' description of the photograph was "sheer fantasy".

Further book reviews:

- Gillian Bennett, 'Seeing Ghosts: Experiences of the Paranormal by Hilary Evans', Folklore, Vol. 115, No. 3 (Dec. 2004), pp. 373–374 (JSTOR).
- Steve Rybicki, 'The Picture Researcher's Handbook by Hilary Evans, Mary Evans, Andra Nelki', RQ, Vol. 15, No. 2 (WINTER 1975), p. 174 (JSTOR).
- Christina Bostick, 'Picture Sources by Ann Novotny, Rosemary Eakins; The Picture Researcher's Handbook; An International Guide to Picture Sources—And How to Use Them by Hilary Evans, Mary Evans, Andra Nelki', ARLIS/NA Newsletter, Vol. 3, No. 6 (October 1975), pp. S8-S9 (JSTOR).
- Nina Auerbach, 'Ghosts of Ghosts', Victorian Literature and Culture, Vol. 32, No. 1 (2004), pp. 277–284 (JSTOR).
- George Guffey, 'Science Fiction: History-Science-Vision by Robert Scholes, Eric S. Rabkin; Beyond the Gaslight: Science in Popular Fiction, 1895–1905, by Hilary Evans, Dik Evans; H. G. Wells and Modern Science Fiction. by Darko Suvin, Robert M. Philmus', Nineteenth-Century Fiction, Vol. 34, No. 1 (June 1979), pp. 112–117 (JSTOR).
- Williams, David R., 'Beyond the Gaslight (book review)', Library Journal 6/1/1977, Vol. 102 Issue 11, p1278 (EBSCO Masterfile).
- Lombardi, Robert, 'Visions Apparitions Alien Visitors (book review)', School Library Journal, Feb 1985, Vol. 31 Issue 6, p92 (EBSCO Masterfile).
- Fraser, Robert S., 'The Picture Researcher's Handbook (Book Review)', Library Journal, 10/1/1975, Vol. 100 Issue 17, p1809 (EBSCO Masterfile).
- Karlin, Daniel, 'It isn't believing', Times Literary Supplement, 6/14/2002, Issue 5176, p36, book review, Seeing Ghosts (EBSCO Masterfile).
- 'Intrusions (book review)', Atlantic (02769077), March 1982, Vol. 249 Issue 3, p89 (EBSCO Masterfile).
- "Harlots, Whores and Hookers", Kirkus Reviews, 15 November 1979.
