= All Saints' Blackheath =

Coordinates: 51.4683°N 0.0077°E

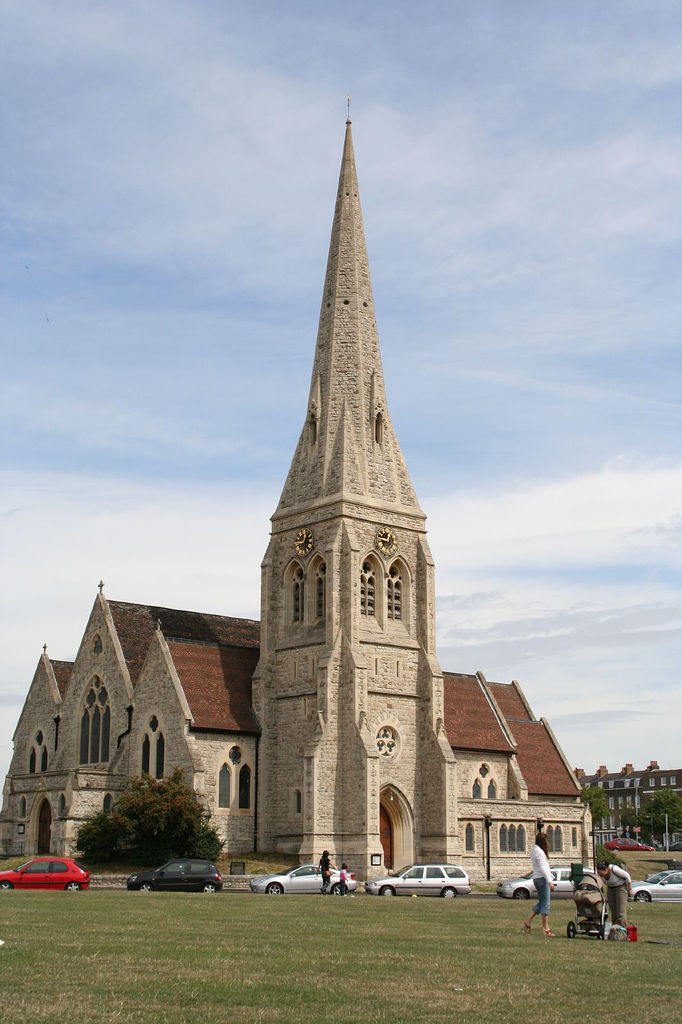
- All Saints' Blackheath
- All Saints' Blackheath
- Location: London, SE3
- Country: England
- Denomination: Church of England
- Website: https://www.allsaintsblackheath.org/

History
- Founded: 1857
- Dedicated: 1858

Architecture
- Heritage designation: Grade II
- Architect: Benjamin Ferrey
- Years built: 1867 (present)

Administration
- Diocese: Southwark

Clergy
- Vicar: Fr Nicholas Cranfield

All Saints' Blackheath is an Anglican parish church in Blackheath, London. Today a Grade II listed building, it was opened in November 1858 by the Bishop of London and was designed by Benjamin Ferrey.

== History ==
Until the early 19th century, the hamlet of Blackheath south of the common was served by churches in nearby Greenwich, Lee, Lewisham and Charlton. In 1854, residents appealed for the building of their own church, and, in 1857, construction of a parish church was agreed. Land on the southern edge of the common was donated by William Legge, 5th Earl of Dartmouth, and he laid the foundation stone on 26 October 1857. On All Saints’ Day, 1 November 1858, the Bishop of London, Archibald Campbell Tait, consecrated the church, which had been designed by the architect Benjamin Ferrey; construction continued until 1867. From 1867 to 1905, the church formed part of the Diocese of Rochester; it now falls under the Diocese of Southwark.

The church hosted choirs assembled by Sir Arthur Sullivan and Gustav Holst; the opera composer Alfred Cellier was organist from 1862 to 1866, playing an organ made by Hill & Son in 1859 (and later enlarged by them).

A memorial screen commemorating local people who died in World War I was unveiled inside the church in April 1920.

All Saints' was given listed building status in August 1954.

Terry Waite, humanitarian and a hostage in Lebanon between 1987 and 1991, lived in Blackheath and worked at All Saints' Blackheath. For the five years of Waite's detention the vicar, Rev Henry Burgin, kept a candle lit in the church.

=== Architecture ===
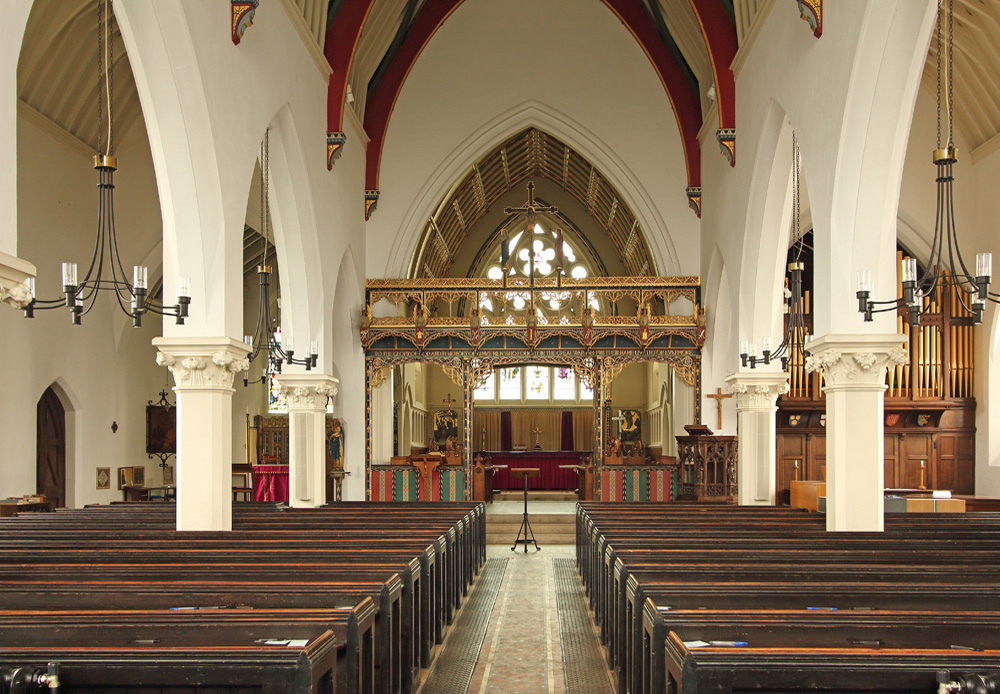
Interior of All Saints' Blackheath

Ferrey designed a church which was constructed with Kentish ragstone and has a spire on its south-west corner. Vestries were added in 1890 and a porch in 1899, both to designs by Arthur Blomfield.

Pevsner described it as "Puginian … already old fashioned", adding it was "Remarkable for the way in which it is placed right into the heath. Surrounded on all sides by grass, it stands as if it were a model."

== Associated buildings ==
A National School of Industry, founded in Blackheath Vale in 1825, was taken over by the All Saints' parish in 1867, becoming All Saints' Girls School. This moved to a new site in Blackheath Vale in 1878, and in 1939 became an infants and junior mixed school, All Saints' C of E Primary School.

In 1924 the church appointed the recently retired London County Council architect Charles Canning Winmill (1865–1945), who lived locally at 2 Eliot Place and attended the church, to design All Saints' Parish Hall, which was constructed on land donated by the 6th Earl of Dartmouth in nearby Tranquil Vale and opened in 1928.
