= Henry Bathurst =

Henry Bathurst may refer to:

- Henry Bathurst, 2nd Earl Bathurst (1714–1794), British lawyer and politician
- Henry Bathurst, 3rd Earl Bathurst (1762–1834), British politician
- Henry Bathurst, 4th Earl Bathurst (1790–1866), British politician
- Henry Bathurst, 8th Earl Bathurst (1927–2011), British politician
- Henry Bathurst (bishop) (1744–1837), Bishop of Norwich
- Henry Bathurst (priest) (1781–1844), Anglican priest
- Henry Bathurst (judge) (1623–1676), English-born judge in Ireland
