= Katherine Bathurst =

British Inspector of schools

- Born: 10 May 1862; Diddington
- Died: 12 March 1933 (aged 70); Ryde
- Education: informal
- Occupation: school inspector
- Known for: being outspoken

Katherine Bathurst (10 May 1862 – 12 March 1933) was a British Inspector of schools. She was frequently outspoken, according to her changing supervision. Her forced resignation resulted in a "unique example" of a government report because it showed a large difference of opinion between a ministry and its servant.

== Life ==
Bathurst was born in Diddington in 1862. Her parents were Catherine Georgiana (born Moore), daughter of Rev. Calvert Fitzgerald Moore who was a chaplain to the King and the Reverend Frederick Bathurst who was a cricketer and bellringer. Several of her uncles were clergy, and her aunt Catherine Bathurst was a prioress and school founder.

Bathurst was educated privately in Brighton before going on to tuition in Germany and a tour of Switzerland and Italy. She appears to have never obtained an educational qualification herself but she taught at Morley College for Working Men and Women and went to lectures for two years at the London School of Economics until 1897. In that year, Bathurst was appointed to be the third ever woman sub-inspector for education. This was her first job inspecting teaching and she noted for being outspoken in her criticism of teachers in London's East End. Bathurst was subsequently moved to Lambeth where her new supervisor Revd Charles D. Dupont noted that she could be "clever", "very dangerous" and she was "unsuitable as an inspector". Dupont told this to John Eldon Gorst who was the Vice-President of the Committee on Education.

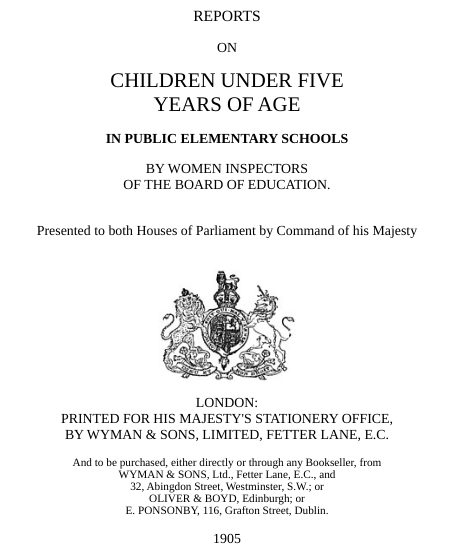
The contentious "Reports on Children Under Five Years of Age in Public Elementary Schools (1905)"

Gorst obtained similar reports when Bathurst was sent to look at infant schools in Wales. He was alarmed to see how she dealt with infant teaching in Cardiff and Barry noted that she also decided to complain to Sir George Kekewich about the inspector's task of marking teacher's exam papers. Nevertheless, she was now described as a "Junior Inspector" and she requested a transfer.

In 1901 Bathurst was transferred from Wales to work under the supervision of Edmond Holmes in Oxfordshire. Disputes between them included expenses, timetables and Bathurst's objections to Holmes amending her reports. The Oxford Education Committee complained about her and she was given six months probation in February 1904 and in the following month female inspectors were moved to a new organisation as proposed by Robert Morant. Each woman inspector was based in a different city and Bathurst was sent to Manchester in March 1904 where E. M. Sneyd-Kynnersley was her new boss. She had been asked by Robert Morant to look at elementary schools for three to five year olds.

Reports on Children Under Five Years of Age in Public Elementary Schools (1905) by Women Inspectors of the Board of Education was published by HM Stationery Office in 1905. Bathurst's contribution to the joint report was much larger than those of the other inspectors. The introduction to the report noted, One of these [inspectors], who has since retired, only visited some schools in one of the large County Boroughs during a few months: her report contains some interesting expressions of personal opinion and a record of impressions on educational and social matters not confined to the range of the proposed inquiry. However Bathurst had not retired but had been instructed to resign. On the day of her resignation she added additional material which Morant did not want to publish. However Bathurst insisted. She had been encouraged by Gorst who wanted revenge on Morant for losing his position. The result is said to be a unique example which shows in public a difference of opinion between a ministry and its servant.

The report did remove the names of individuals but it contained Bathurst's findings that teaching was concentrating on reading, writing and arithmetic, books and blackboards, where "play" was much more important. She described how four-year-old children would spend an hour a day doing needlework which she believed was only intended to benefit the school inspector.

This was the end of Bathurst's working life, but she published articles in The Nineteenth Century magazine continuing her theme that the education of the young required drastic improvement and the difference in content between the education offered to boys, but not to girls. Bathurst died in Ryde in 1933.

== Collections ==
The Institute of Education, University College London holds Bathurst's archive; it was originally donated to the National Union of Women Teachers whose archive is also held at the Institute. The collection contains personal correspondence, reports and inspection forms, and press cuttings relating to educational issues during Bathurst's career.
