= Frederick Bathurst =

Archdeacon of Bedford

The Ven. Frederick Bathurst (7 March 1827 – 23 September 1910) was an English Anglican clergyman from the Bathurst family. He played first class cricket and he was later Archdeacon of Bedford from 1873 to 1910.

== Life ==
Bathurst was the sixth son of General Sir James Bathurst (died 1850) and Lady Caroline Stewart, daughter of the 1st Earl Castle Stewart. Henry Bathurst, Bishop of Norwich and nephew of the 1st Earl Bathurst, was his grandfather. The cricketer Robert Bathurst was his brother and his sister Catherine Bathurst was a leading nun.

Bathurst was educated at Winchester College, and matriculated at Merton College, Oxford in 1845, graduating B.A. in 1849, M.A. in 1852. He made six appearances in important matches, representing Oxford University Cricket Club (1846–1849) and, after a ten-year hiatus, Marylebone Cricket Club in 1859. He held incumbencies at Diddington (1857–1874), Biggleswade (1874–1884) and Holwell (1884–1902).

== Family ==
Bathurst married Catherine Georgiana Moore, daughter of Rev. Calvert Fitzgerald Moore who died at Holwell rectory, aged 80, on 29 June 1902. They had a daughter, Katherine Bathurst, in 1862 who became an outspoken inspector of schools.

Church of England titles
Preceded by Henry Rose	Archdeacon of Bedford; 1873–1910	Succeeded by Noel Hodges
