= Catherine Bathurst =

Roman Catholic nun

- Born: 14 July 1825; Wookey
- Died: 14 December 1907 (aged 82); Harrow
- Other name: Sister Mary Catherine Philip
- Occupation: nun
- Known for: convert to be a Catholic and in time founding a convent and school in Ghent and later Harrow

Sister Mary Catherine Philip (born Catherine Anne Bathurst; 14 July 1825 – 14 December 1907) was a Roman Catholic convert, nun and Prioress. She founded a school in Belgium which became (in time) St Dominic's Sixth Form College in Harrow.

== Life ==
Bathurst was born in Wookey in Somersetshire. She was the daughter of Sir James Bathurst, an army officer and Lady Caroline, a daughter of 1st Earl Castle Stewart. Her grandfather was Henry Bathurst, Bishop of Norwich who was a nephew of the 1st Earl Bathurst. Frederick Bathurst and Robert Bathurst (cricketer) were her brothers. Her eldest brother was Stuart Bathurst and he became a Church of England priest and rector of Kibworth Beauchamp in Leicestershire. In 1850 Stuart converted to Catholicism under the influence of John Henry Newman and he became the parish priest at Wednesbury in Staffordshire. Catherine also concerted to be a Catholic within months and she was given a Conditional baptism (to avoid giving two) by Father Brownbill SJ. She met Newman and she began a long time correspondence with him which consisted of over 80 letters.

Bathurst decided on a religious life but she found a long time to find a home. She joined Elizabeth Lockhart's Sisters of Charity of the Precious Blood at Greenwich in 1852. She then tried the Sisters of Providence in Loughborough before returning to Greenwich after a year. She spent three years working at poor schools and orphanages in Birmingham. In 1861 she appeared to have found a home at Margaret Hallahan's Dominican Congregation of St. Catherine of Siena. She took the name Sister Mary Catherine Philip in November but by April 1862 she had returned to Birmingham after her last sister became a suicide.

In 1868 she was in Ghent where she agreed to found an order of Dominicans. By 1870 there was a convent and a school building in Meirelbeke with Bathurst as the Prioress. The next move was a move by the whole convent. Bathurst and her Dominican Order sisters from Ghent set up a girls' boarding school in Harrow in 1878 at the invitation of Cardinal Manning

== Death and legacy ==
Bathurst died in Harrow in 1907. In July 1979 the convent school she founded closed and the remaining nuns transferred to the Dominican convent in Stone, Staffordshire,St Dominic's Sixth Form College opened in the building that had been St Dominic's Independent Grammar School for girls.
