= Stuart Bathurst =

English cricketer and cleric

Stuart Eyre Bathurst (10 December 1815 – 15 March 1900) was an English cleric, and a first-class cricketer active 1836–39 who played for Oxford University. He notably switched from being a Church of England priest to become a Roman Catholic one.

== Life ==
Bathurst was born in Marylebone. He was the son of Sir James Bathurst and the grandson of Henry Bathurst, Bishop of Norwich. His grandfather was a nephew of the 1st Earl Bathurst. He appeared in six first-class matches.

Bathurst was educated at Winchester College and Christ Church, Oxford. He later moved to Merton College of which he was a fellow 1839–45. He became a Church of England priest and was rector of Kibworth Beauchamp, Leicestershire.

In 1850 he converted to Catholicism under the influence of John Henry Newman. His sister Catherine Bathurst soon followed and she became a leading nun and school founder and a long time correspondent with Newman. Stuart Bathurst became the parish priest at Wednesbury, Staffordshire, then moved to Stone, Staffordshire.

== Death and legacy ==
He died in 1900 in Stone, Staffordshire. Stuart Bathurst Catholic High School in Wednesbury is named after him.
