= Wild Talents =

Wild Talents may refer to

- Wild Talents (book), by Charles Fort
- Wild Talents (role-playing game), superhero role-playing game published by Arc Dream Publishing
- Wild Talent, novel by Wilson Tucker (writer)
