= The Book of the Damned =

1919 book by Charles Fort

- First edition cover
- Author: Charles Hoy Fort
- Language: English
- Genre: Anomalistics
- Publisher: Boni and Liveright
- Publication date: 1919
- Media type: Print (hardcover and paperback)
- Pages: 229 pp (2006 paperback)
- ISBN: 1-58509-278-9 (2006 edition, paperback)
- OCLC: 82160299
- Followed by: New Lands

The Book of the Damned was the first published nonfiction work by American author Charles Fort (first edition 1919). Concerning various types of anomalous phenomena including UFOs, strange falls of both organic and inorganic materials from the sky, odd weather patterns, the possible existence of creatures generally believed to be mythological, disappearances of people, and many other phenomena, the book is considered to be the first of the specific topic of anomalistics.

== Overview and Fort's thesis ==
A procession of the damned.
By the damned, I mean the excluded.
We shall have a procession of data that Science has excluded.

— first lines of The Book of the Damned

The title of the book referred to what he termed the "damned" data – data that had been damned, or excluded, by modern science because of their not conforming to accepted belief. Fort charged that mainstream scientists are conformists who believe in what is accepted and popular, and never really search for truth that may be contrary to what they believe. He also compared the close-mindedness of many scientists to that of religious fundamentalists, implying that the supposed "battle" between science and religion is just a distraction for the fact that, science, in his opinion is in essence simply a de facto religion. This is a theme that Fort developed more in his later works, New Lands and Lo!, particularly.

Fort was one of the first major writers to deal extensively with paranormal phenomena and The Book of the Damned has been hailed as highly influential on later writers on the paranormal.

== Content ==
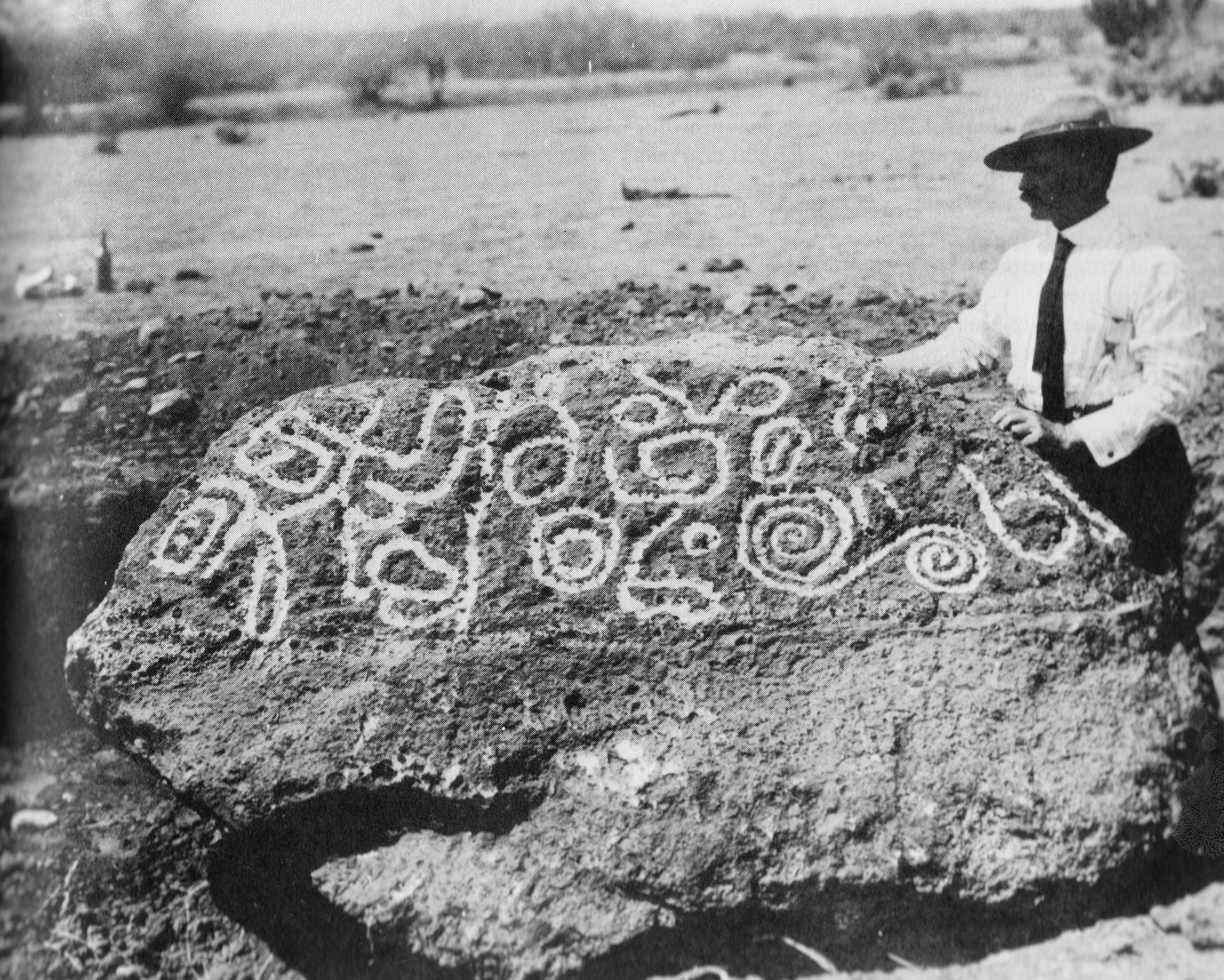
Frederick Russell Burnham standing next to the mysterious Esperanza Stone, the subject of Chapter 11.

The first few chapters of the book deal largely with explaining Fort's thesis. As a particular instance, he cites the strange glowing in the sky worldwide, which supposedly resulted from the 1883 eruption of the volcano Krakatoa. Fort claims that such a phenomenon had in fact preceded the eruption by several months, and suggests that scientists, who had been puzzled by the phenomenon initially, used Krakatoa as a convenient explanation for something that they could not explain previously.

Fort has a particular interest in strange "falls", and discusses purported falls of fish, frogs, and various unidentifiable materials. He also has chapters discussing the findings of "thunderstones", which supposedly fell from the sky during lightning storms; a discussion of evidence for the existence of giants (huge oversized axes too big for any person to use) and fairies (so-called "fairy crosses" and "coffins"); a brief chapter on poltergeist phenomena; the disappearances of many people (including the supposed disappearance of several hundred people in a shelter during the 1755 Lisbon earthquake; he also briefly mentions the famous case of the Mary Celeste (which he would discuss in much more detail in his later Lo!); a rather long section concerning a number of purported UFO sightings (this book was written well before 1947, Kenneth Arnold, and the start of modern UFO allegations); and ends with a mention of the "Devil's Footprints" mystery in England during 1855, also citing a number of similar cases. The book also discusses triangle UFOs and sightings of them in various parts of the world from the early 1880s.

== Fort's theory and criticism ==
Fort's explanation for the above "falls" and UFO sightings is that of the Super-Sargasso Sea – i.e., kind of a stationary "sea" where all things on Earth that are lost are mysteriously found, and occasionally rain back down on Earth (he developed this idea in much more detail in his later books). Though Fort himself apparently does not really believe this explanation, he (at least in this book) does not purport to explain the phenomena as a whole, simply stating the facts as they are, and letting readers to make their own conclusions. His lack of explanation for the phenomena he presents has led some skeptics and critics, particularly Martin Gardner, to criticize Fort as simply a destructive critic (or "crank") presenting negative claims without positive accounts.

== Publication ==
The Book of the Damned was published by the American firm Boni & Liveright, who were the then publishers of Fort's friend, the author Theodore Dreiser. It was on Dreiser's suggestion that Boni & Liveright published the book. Advertising of the book was handled by Boni & Liveright's publicist, Edward Bernays.

== Availability ==
The Book of the Damned is available in paperback from Tarcher, Prometheus Books, and because it has become public domain, can also be found in Dover Publications's The Complete Works of Charles Fort, which contains all of his books on this subject, and several websites. The book has also been made available in audio format at LibriVox.
