= Peter Park =

Peter Park may refer to:

- T. Peter Park, (born 1941) an historian
- Peter C. Park, an alumnus of Northwestern California University School of Law
- A 2024 fellow from the International Society for Computational Biology
- Peter Detmold Park a public facility in Manhattan, New York, United States
- Peter Francisco Park a city square in Newark, New Jersey, United States
- Lake St. Peter Provincial Park a recreation-class provincial facility in Ontario, Canada

== See also ==
- Peter Parker (disambiguation)
