= Paranormal =

Purported phenomena beyond the scope of normal scientific understanding

Paranormal events are purported or imagined phenomena described in popular culture, folklore, and other non-scientific bodies of knowledge, whose existence within these contexts is described as being beyond the scope of normal scientific understanding. Notable paranormal beliefs include those that pertain to extrasensory perceptions (for example, telepathy), and the pseudosciences of ghost hunting, cryptozoology, and ufology.

Proposals regarding the paranormal are different from scientific hypotheses, or speculations extrapolated from scientific evidence, because scientific ideas are grounded in empirical observations and experimental data gained through the scientific method. In contrast, those who argue for the existence of the paranormal explicitly do not base their arguments on empirical evidence but rather on anecdote, testimony, and suspicion. The standard scientific models give the explanation that what appears to be paranormal phenomena is usually a misinterpretation, misunderstanding, or anomalous variation of natural phenomena.

== Etymology ==
The first use of the word paranormal was in 1905, to describe observed events or things that are presumed to operate on physical laws, but laws which are not known.

== Paranormal subjects ==
On the classification of paranormal subjects, psychologist Terence Hines said in his book Pseudoscience and the Paranormal (2003):

The paranormal can best be thought of as a subset of pseudoscience. What sets the paranormal apart from other pseudosciences is a reliance on explanations for alleged phenomena that are well outside the bounds of established science. Thus, paranormal phenomena include extrasensory perception (ESP), telekinesis, ghosts, poltergeists, life after death, reincarnation, faith healing, human auras, and so forth. The explanations for these allied phenomena are phrased in vague terms of "psychic forces", "human energy fields", and so on. This is in contrast to many pseudoscientific explanations for other nonparanormal phenomena, which, although very bad science, are still couched in acceptable scientific terms.

=== Ghost hunting ===
Ghost hunting is the investigation of locations that are reportedly haunted by ghosts. Typically, a ghost-hunting team will attempt to collect evidence supporting the existence of paranormal activity.

In traditional ghostlore and fiction featuring ghosts, a ghost is a manifestation of the spirit or soul of a person. Alternative theories expand on that idea and include belief in the ghosts of deceased animals. Sometimes the term "ghost" is used synonymously with any spirit or demon; however, in popular usage, the term typically refers to the spirit of a deceased person.

The belief in ghosts as souls of the departed is closely tied to the concept of animism, an ancient belief that attributed souls to everything in nature. As the 19th-century anthropologist George Frazer explained in his classic work, The Golden Bough (1890), souls were seen as the 'creature within' which animated the body.

=== Ufology ===
The possibility of extraterrestrial life is not, in itself, a paranormal subject. Many scientists are actively engaged in the search for unicellular life within the Solar System, carrying out studies on the surface of Mars and examining meteors that have fallen to Earth. Projects such as SETI are conducting an astronomical search for radio activity that would show evidence of intelligent life outside the Solar System. Scientific theories of how life developed on Earth allow for the possibility that life also developed on other planets. The paranormal aspect of extraterrestrial life centers largely around the belief in unidentified flying objects (UFOs) and the phenomena said to be associated with them.

Early in the history of UFO culture, believers divided themselves into two camps. The first held a rather conservative view of the phenomena, interpreting them as unexplained occurrences that merited serious study. They began calling themselves "ufologists" in the 1950s and felt that logical analysis of sighting reports would validate the notion of extraterrestrial visitation.

The second camp held a view that coupled ideas of extraterrestrial visitation with beliefs from existing quasi-religious movements. Typically, these individuals were enthusiasts of occultism and the paranormal. Many had backgrounds as active Theosophists or spiritualists, or were followers of other esoteric doctrines. In contemporary times, many of these beliefs have coalesced into New Age spiritual movements.

Both secular and spiritual believers describe UFOs as having abilities beyond what are considered possible according to known aerodynamic constraints and physical laws. The transitory events surrounding many UFO sightings preclude any opportunity for the repeat testing required by the scientific method. Acceptance of UFO theories by the larger scientific community is further hindered by the many possible hoaxes associated with UFO culture.

=== Cryptozoology ===
Cryptozoology is a pseudoscience and subculture that searches for and studies unknown, legendary, or extinct animals whose present existence is disputed or unsubstantiated.

== Paranormal research ==
Approaching the paranormal from a research perspective is often difficult because of the lack of acceptable physical evidence from most of the purported phenomena. By definition, the paranormal (or supernatural) does not conform to conventional expectations of nature. Therefore, a phenomenon cannot be confirmed as paranormal using the scientific method because, if it could be, it would no longer fit the definition. (However, confirmation would result in the phenomenon being reclassified as part of science.) Despite this problem, studies on the paranormal are periodically conducted by researchers from various disciplines. Some researchers simply study the beliefs in the paranormal regardless of whether the phenomena are considered to objectively exist. This section deals with various approaches to the paranormal: anecdotal, experimental, and participant-observer approaches and the skeptical investigation approach.

=== Anecdotal approach ===
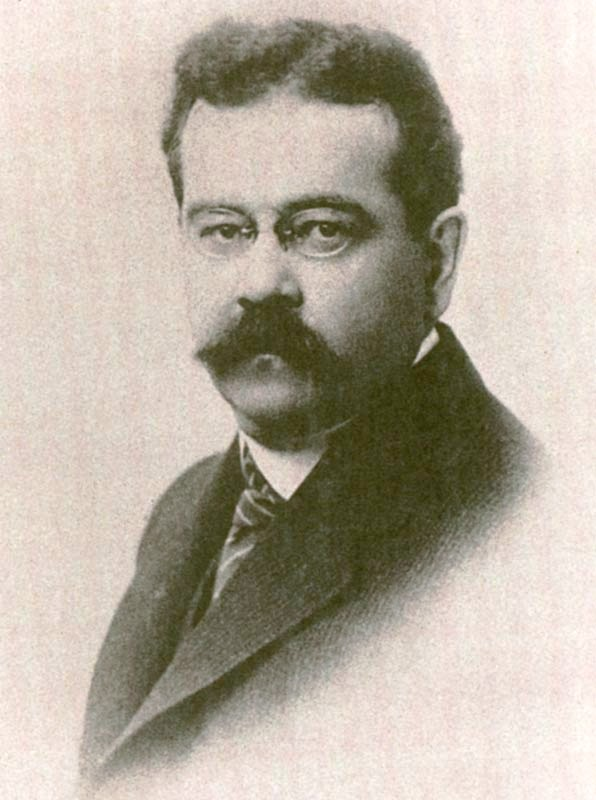
Charles Fort, 1920. Fort is perhaps the most widely known collector of paranormal stories.

Charles Fort (1874–1932) was a collector of paranormal anecdotes. Fort is said to have compiled as many as 40,000 notes on unexplained paranormal experiences, though there were no doubt many more. These notes came from what he called "the orthodox conventionality of Science", which were odd events originally reported in magazines and newspapers such as The Times and scientific journals such as Scientific American, Nature and Science. From this research Fort wrote seven books, though only four survive: The Book of the Damned (1919), New Lands (1923), Lo! (1931) and Wild Talents (1932); one book was written between New Lands and Lo!, but it was abandoned and absorbed into Lo!

=== Parapsychology ===
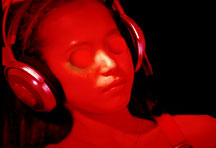
Participant of a Ganzfeld experiment which proponents say may show evidence of telepathy.

Experimental investigation of the paranormal has been conducted by parapsychologists. J. B. Rhine popularized the now famous methodology of using card-guessing and dice-rolling experiments in a laboratory in the hopes of finding evidence of extrasensory perception. However, it was revealed that Rhine's experiments contained methodological flaws and procedural errors.

In 1957, the Parapsychological Association was formed as the preeminent society for parapsychologists. In 1969, they became affiliated with the American Association for the Advancement of Science. Criticisms of the field were focused in the creation (in 1976) of the Committee for the Scientific Investigation of Claims of the Paranormal (now called the Committee for Skeptical Inquiry) and its periodical, the Skeptical Inquirer. Eventually, more mainstream scientists became critical of parapsychology as an endeavor, and statements by the National Academies of Science and the National Science Foundation cast a pall on the claims of evidence for parapsychology. Today, many cite parapsychology as an example of a pseudoscience. Parapsychology has been criticized for continuing investigation despite being unable to provide convincing evidence for the existence of any psychic phenomena after more than a century of research.

By the 2000s, the status of paranormal research in the United States had greatly declined from its height in the 1970s, with the majority of work being privately funded and only a small amount of research being carried out in university laboratories. In 2007, Britain had a number of privately funded laboratories in university psychology departments. Publication remained limited to a small number of niche journals, and to date there have been no experimental results that have gained wide acceptance in the scientific community as valid evidence of the paranormal.

=== Participant-observer approach ===
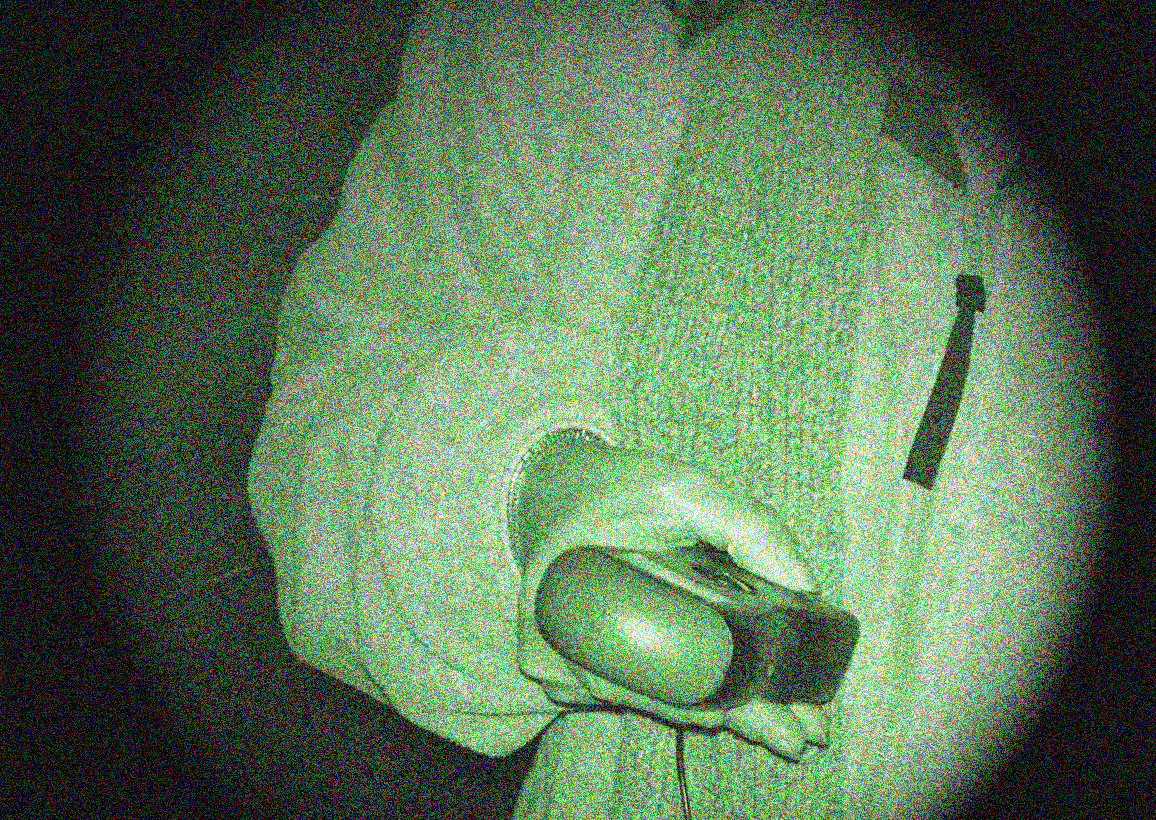
A ghost hunter taking an EMF reading, which proponents claim may be connected to paranormal activity

While parapsychologists look for quantitative evidence of the paranormal in laboratories, a great number of people immerse themselves in qualitative research through participant-observer approaches to the paranormal. Participant-observer methodologies have overlaps with other essentially qualitative approaches, including phenomenological research that seeks largely to describe subjects as they are experienced, rather than to explain them.

Participant observation suggests that by immersing oneself in the subject that is being studied, a researcher is presumed to gain an understanding of the subject. Criticisms of participant observation as a data-gathering technique are similar to criticisms of other approaches to the paranormal, but also include an increased threat to the scientific objectivity of the researcher, unsystematic gathering of data, reliance on subjective measurement, and possible observer effects (i.e. observation may distort the observed behavior). Specific data-gathering methods, such as recording EMF (electromagnetic field) readings at haunted locations, have their own criticisms beyond those attributed to the participant-observer approach itself.

Participant observation, as an approach to the paranormal, has gained increased visibility and popularity through reality television programs like Ghost Hunters, and the formation of independent ghost hunting groups that advocate immersive research at alleged paranormal locations. One popular website for ghost hunting enthusiasts lists over 300 of these organizations throughout the United States and the United Kingdom.

== Skeptical scientific investigation ==
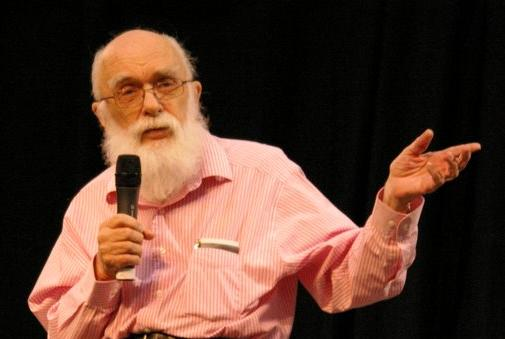
James Randi was a well-known investigator of paranormal claims.

Scientific skeptics advocate critical investigation of claims of paranormal phenomena: applying the scientific method to reach a rational, scientific explanation of the phenomena to account for the paranormal claims, taking into account that alleged paranormal abilities and occurrences are sometimes hoaxes or misinterpretations of natural phenomena. A way of summarizing this method is by the application of Occam's razor, which suggests that the simpler solution is usually the correct one. The Committee for Skeptical Inquiry (CSI), formerly the Committee for the Scientific Investigation of Claims of the Paranormal (CSICOP), is an organization that aims to publicize the scientific, skeptical approach. It carries out investigations aimed at understanding paranormal reports in terms of scientific understanding, and publishes its results in the Skeptical Inquirer magazine.

CSI's Richard Wiseman draws attention to possible alternative explanations for perceived paranormal activity in his article, The Haunted Brain. While he recognizes that approximately 15% of people believe they have experienced an encounter with a ghost, he reports that only 1% report seeing a full-fledged ghost, while the rest report strange sensory stimuli, such as seeing fleeting shadows or wisps of smoke, or the sensation of hearing footsteps or feeling a presence. Wiseman makes the claim that, rather than experiencing paranormal activity, it is activity within our own brains that creates these strange sensations.

Michael Persinger proposed that ghostly experiences could be explained by stimulating the brain with weak magnetic fields. Swedish psychologist Pehr Granqvist and his team, attempting to replicate Persinger's research, determined that the paranormal sensations experienced by Persinger's subjects were merely the result of suggestion, and that brain stimulation with magnetic fields did not result in ghostly experiences. Oxford University Justin Barrett has theorized that "agency"—being able to figure out why people do what they do—is so important in everyday life that it is natural for our brains to work too hard at it, thereby detecting human or ghost-like behavior in everyday meaningless stimuli.

James Randi, an investigator with a background in illusion, felt that the simplest explanation for those claiming paranormal abilities is often trickery, illustrated by demonstrating that the spoon bending abilities of psychic Uri Geller can easily be duplicated by trained stage magicians. He was also the founder of the James Randi Educational Foundation and its million dollar challenge that offered a prize of $1,000,000 to anyone who could demonstrate evidence of any paranormal, supernatural or occult power or event, under test conditions agreed to by both parties. Despite many declarations of supernatural ability, the prize was never claimed.

=== Psychology ===
In "anomalistic psychology", paranormal phenomena have naturalistic explanations resulting from psychological and physical factors, which have sometimes given the impression of paranormal activity to some people, in fact, where there have been none. The psychologist David Marks wrote that paranormal phenomena can be explained by magical thinking, mental imagery, subjective validation, coincidence, hidden causes, and fraud. According to studies, some people tend to hold paranormal beliefs because they possess psychological traits that make them more likely to misattribute paranormal causation to normal experiences. Research has also discovered that cognitive bias is a factor underlying paranormal belief.

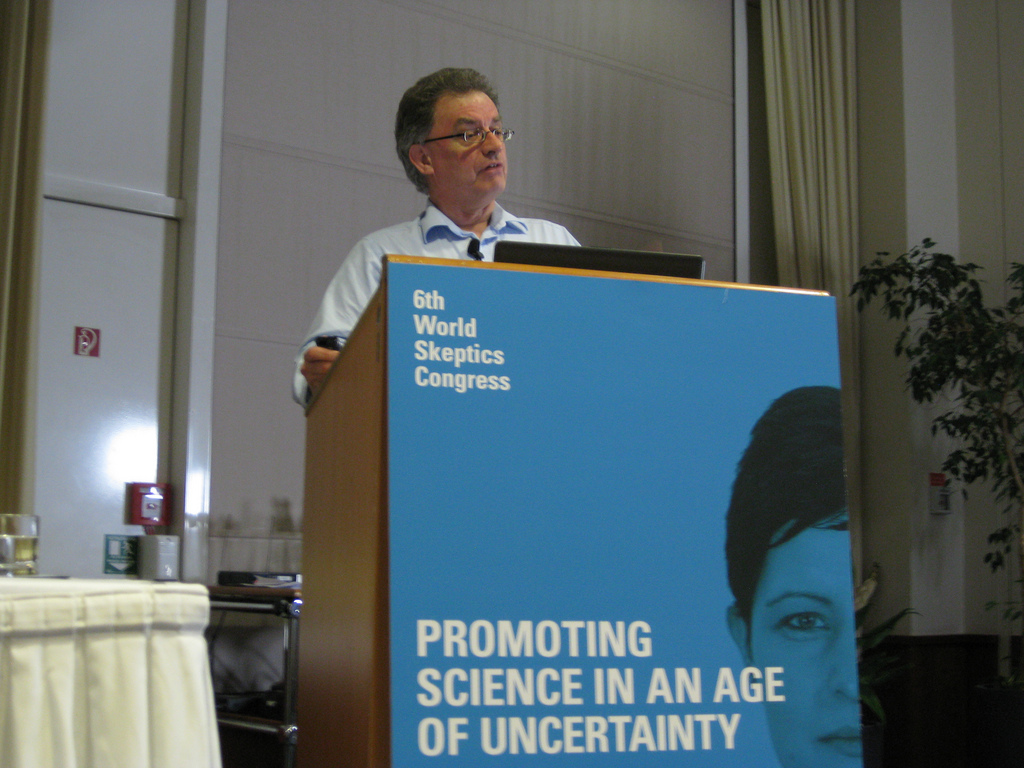
Chris French, founder of the Anomalistic Psychology Research Unit.

Many studies have found a link between personality and psychopathology variables correlating with paranormal belief. Some studies have also shown that fantasy proneness correlates positively with paranormal belief.

Bainbridge (1978) and Wuthnow (1976) found that the most susceptible people to paranormal belief are those who are poorly educated, unemployed, or have roles that rank low among social values. The alienation of these people due to their status in society is said to encourage them to appeal to paranormal or magical beliefs.

Research has associated paranormal belief with low cognitive ability, low IQ, and a lack of science education. Intelligent and highly educated participants involved in surveys have proven to have less paranormal belief. Tobacyk (1984) and Messer and Griggs (1989) discovered that college students with better grades have less belief in the paranormal.

In a case study (Gow, 2004) involving 167 participants, the findings revealed that psychological absorption and dissociation were higher for believers in the paranormal. Another study involving 100 students had revealed a positive correlation between paranormal belief and proneness to dissociation. A study (Williams et al. 2007) discovered that "neuroticism is fundamental to individual differences in paranormal belief, while paranormal belief is independent of extraversion and psychoticism". A correlation has been found between paranormal belief and irrational thinking.

In an experiment Wierzbicki (1985) reported a significant correlation between paranormal belief and the number of errors made on a syllogistic reasoning task, suggesting that believers in the paranormal have lower cognitive ability. A relationship between narcissistic personality and paranormal belief was discovered in a study involving the Australian Sheep-Goat Scale.

De Boer and Bierman wrote:

In his article 'Creative or Defective', Radin (2005) asserts that many academics explain the belief in the paranormal by using one of the three following hypotheses: Ignorance, deprivation, or deficiency. 'The ignorance hypothesis asserts that people believe in the paranormal because they're uneducated or stupid. The deprivation hypothesis proposes that these beliefs exist to provide a way to cope in the face of psychological uncertainties and physical stressors. The deficiency hypothesis asserts that such beliefs arise because people are mentally defective in some way, ranging from low intelligence or poor critical thinking ability to a full-blown psychosis (Radin). The deficiency hypothesis gets some support from the fact that the belief in the paranormal is an aspect of a schizotypical personality (Pizzagalli, Lehman, and Brugger, 2001).

A psychological study involving 174 members of the Society for Psychical Research completed a delusional ideation questionnaire and a deductive reasoning task. As predicted, the study showed that "individuals who reported a strong belief in the paranormal made more errors and displayed more delusional ideation than skeptical individuals". There was also a reasoning bias, which was limited to people who reported a belief in, rather than experience of, paranormal phenomena. The results suggested that reasoning abnormalities may have a causal role in the formation of paranormal beliefs.

Research has shown that people reporting contact with aliens have higher levels of absorption, dissociativity, fantasy proneness and tendency to hallucinate.

Findings have shown in specific cases that paranormal belief acts as a psychodynamic coping function and serves as a mechanism for coping with stress. Survivors from childhood sexual abuse, violent and unsettled home environments have reported having higher levels of paranormal belief. A study of a random sample of 502 adults revealed paranormal experiences were common in the population which were linked to a history of childhood trauma and dissociative symptoms. Research has also suggested that people who perceive themselves as having little control over their lives may develop paranormal beliefs to help provide an enhanced sense of control. The similarities between paranormal events and descriptions of trauma have also been noted.

Gender differences in surveys on paranormal belief have reported women scoring higher than men overall and men having greater belief in UFOs and extraterrestrials. Surveys have also investigated the relationship between ethnicity and paranormal belief. In a sample of American university students (Tobacyk et al. 1988) it was found that people of African descent have a higher level of belief in superstitions and witchcraft while belief in extraterrestrial life forms was stronger among people of European descent. Otis and Kuo (1984) surveyed Singapore university students and found Chinese, Indian and Malay students to differ in their paranormal beliefs, with the Chinese students showing greater skepticism.

According to American surveys analysed by Bader et al (2011) African Americans have the firmest belief in the paranormal, and while the findings are not uniform, the "general trend is for whites to show lesser belief in most paranormal subjects". Polls show that about fifty percent of the United States population believes in the paranormal. Robert L. Park says a lot of people believe in it because they "want it to be so".

A 2013 study that utilized a biological motion perception task discovered a "relation between illusory pattern perception and supernatural and paranormal beliefs and suggest that paranormal beliefs are strongly related to agency detection biases".

A 2014 study discovered that schizophrenic patients have more belief in psi than healthy adults.

=== Neuroscience ===
Some scientists have investigated possible neurocognitive processes underlying the formation of paranormal beliefs. In a study (Pizzagalli et al, 2000), data demonstrated that "subjects differing in their declared belief in and experience with paranormal phenomena as well as in their schizotypal ideation, as determined by a standardized instrument, displayed differential brain electric activity during resting periods." Another study (Schulter and Papousek, 2008) wrote that paranormal belief can be explained by patterns of functional hemispheric asymmetry that may be related to perturbations during fetal development.

It was also realized that people with higher dopamine levels have the ability to find patterns and meanings where there are none. This is why scientists have connected high dopamine levels with paranormal belief.

=== Criticism ===
Some scientists have criticized the media for promoting paranormal claims. In a report by Singer and Benassi in 1981, they wrote that the media may account for much of the near universality of paranormal belief, as the public is constantly exposed to films, newspapers, documentaries, and books endorsing paranormal claims, while critical coverage is largely absent. According to Paul Kurtz, "Regarding the many talk shows that constantly deal with paranormal topics, the skeptical viewpoint is rarely heard; and when it is permitted to be expressed, it is usually sandbagged by the host or other guests." Kurtz described the popularity of public belief in the paranormal as a "quasi-religious phenomenon", a manifestation of a transcendental temptation, a tendency for people to seek a transcendental reality that cannot be known by using the methods of science. Kurtz compared this to a primitive form of magical thinking.

Terence Hines has written that on a personal level, paranormal claims could be considered a form of consumer fraud as people are "being induced through false claims to spend their money—often large sums—on paranormal claims that do not deliver what they promise" and uncritical acceptance of paranormal belief systems can be damaging to society.

== Belief polls ==
While the existence of paranormal phenomena is controversial and debated passionately by both proponents of the paranormal and by skeptics, surveys are useful in determining the beliefs of people regarding paranormal phenomena. These opinions, while not constituting scientific evidence for or against, may give an indication of the mindset of a certain portion of the population (at least among those who answered the polls). The number of people worldwide who believe in parapsychological powers has been estimated to be 3 to 4 billion.

A survey conducted in 2006 by researchers from Australia's Monash University sought to determine the types of phenomena that people claim to have experienced and the effects these experiences have had on their lives. The study was conducted as an online survey with over 2,000 respondents from around the world participating. The results revealed that around 70% of the respondents believe they have had an unexplained paranormal event that changed their life, mostly in a positive way. About 70% also claimed to have seen, heard, or been touched by an animal or person that they knew was not there; 80% have reported having a premonition, and almost 50% stated they recalled a previous life.

Polls were conducted by Bryan Farha at Oklahoma City University and Gary Steward of the University of Central Oklahoma in 2006. They found fairly consistent results compared to the results of a Gallup poll in 2001.

Percentage of U.S. citizens polled
Phenomena	Farha-Steward (2006)			Gallup (2001)			Gallup (2005)		
Phenomena	Belief	Unsure	Disbelief	Belief	Unsure	Disbelief	Belief	Unsure	Disbelief
Psychic, Spiritual healing	57	26	18	54	19	26	55 (Note: Also includes the effect of placebo through "power of the human mind to heal the body".)	17	26
ESP	29	39	33	50	20	27	41	25	32
Haunted houses	41	25	35	42	16	41	37	16	46
Demonic possession	41	28	32	41	16	41	42 (Note: Some may have taken this metaphorically.)	13	44
Ghosts	40	27	34	38	17	44	32	19	48
Telepathy	25	34	42	36	26	35	31	27	42
Extraterrestrials visited Earth in the past	18	34	49	33	27	38	24	24	51
Clairvoyance and Prophecy	24	33	43	32	23	45	26	24	50
Mediumship	16	29	55	28	26	46	21	23	55
Astrology	17	26	57	28	18	52	25	19	55
Witches	27	19	55	26	15	59	21	12	66
Reincarnation	16	28	57	25	20	54	20	20	59

A survey by Jeffrey S. Levin, associate professor at Eastern Virginia Medical School, found that more than two-thirds of the United States population reported having at least one mystical experience. A 1996 Gallup poll estimated that 71% of the people in the U.S. believed that the government was covering up information about UFOs. A 2002 Roper poll conducted for the Sci Fi channel reported that 56% thought UFOs were real craft and 48% that aliens had visited the Earth.

A 2001 National Science Foundation survey found that 9% of people polled thought astrology was very scientific, and 31% thought it was somewhat scientific. About 32% of Americans surveyed stated that some numbers were lucky, while 46% of Europeans agreed with that claim. About 60% of all people polled believed in some form of Extra-sensory perception, and 30% thought that "some of the unidentified flying objects that have been reported are really space vehicles from other civilizations."

In 2017, the Chapman University Survey of American Fears asked about seven paranormal beliefs and found that "the most common belief is that ancient advanced civilizations such as Atlantis once existed (55%). Next was that places can be haunted by spirits (52%), aliens have visited Earth in our ancient past (35%), aliens have come to Earth in modern times (26%), some people can move objects with their minds (25%), fortune tellers and psychics can survey the future (19%), and Bigfoot is a real creature. Only one-fourth of respondents didn't hold at least one of these beliefs."

== Paranormal challenges ==
In 1922, Scientific American offered two US$2,500 offers: (1) for the first authentic spirit photograph made under test conditions, and (2) for the first psychic to produce a "visible psychic manifestation". Harry Houdini was a member of the investigating committee. The first medium to be tested was George Valiantine, who claimed that in his presence spirits would speak through a trumpet that floated around a darkened room. For the test, Valiantine was placed in a room, the lights were extinguished, but unbeknownst to him, his chair had been rigged to light a signal in an adjoining room if he ever left his seat. Because the light signals were tripped during his performance, Valiantine did not collect the award. The last to be examined by Scientific American was Mina Crandon in 1924.

Since then, many individuals and groups have offered similar monetary awards for proof of the paranormal in an observed setting. These prizes have a combined value of over $2.4 million.

The James Randi Educational Foundation offered a prize of a million dollars to a person who could prove that they had supernatural or paranormal abilities under appropriate test conditions. Several other skeptic groups also offer a monetary prize for proof of the paranormal, including the largest group of paranormal investigators, the Independent Investigations Group, which has chapters in Hollywood, Atlanta, Denver, Washington, D.C., Alberta, B.C., and San Francisco. The IIG offers a $100,000 prize and a $5,000 finders fee if a claimant can prove a paranormal claim under 2 scientifically controlled tests. Founded in 2000, no claimant has passed the first (and lower odds) of the test.

== See also ==
=== Paranormal ===
- Folie à deux
- Ghost Stations
- Mysticism
- Out-of-body experience
- Preternatural
- Psionics
- List of paranormal magazines
- List of reported UFO sightings
- Yūrei
- Category:Paranormal investigators
- Supernatural

=== By location ===
- Bangladesh
- Canada
- China
- Colombia
- France
- India
- Mexico
- Philippines
- Romania
- United Kingdom
  - Scotland
- United States
  - California
    - San Francisco Bay Area
  - Oregon
  - Pennsylvania
  - Plymouth, Massachusetts
  - Washington, DC

=== Skepticism ===
- Center for Inquiry Investigations Group
- Critical thinking
- Prizes for paranormal proof
- Schizotypy
