= Robert Bathurst (cricketer) =

English cleric, academic, and cricketer

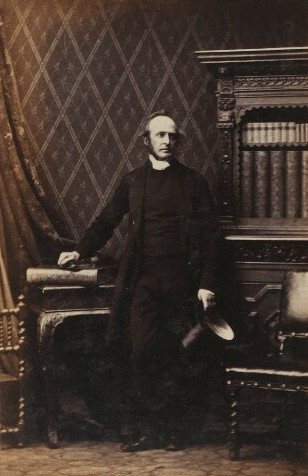
Robert Andrew Bathurst, 1863 photograph

Robert Andrew Bathurst (22 January 1817 – 31 March 1906) was an English cleric and academic. He was also a cricketer.

== Biography ==
He was born in Marylebone, London, the son of Sir James Bathurst, an army officer and Lady Caroline, a daughter of 1st Earl Castle Stewart. Henry Bathurst, Bishop of Norwich and nephew of the 1st Earl Bathurst, was his grandfather. Frederick Bathurst was his brother and his sister Catherine Bathurst was a leading nun.

He became a scholar of Winchester College, in 1827. He was a student at New College, Oxford between 1835 and 1839, and then a Fellow there.

Bathurst was ordained deacon in 1840, and priest in 1841. In 1848 he toured Switzerland with clerical friends, Ashton Oxenden and John Hamilton Forsyth; Forsyth was an invalid suffering from tuberculosis and died that year. Around that time Oxenden became rector of Pluckley in Kent, and in his autobiography The History of My Life describes how he took on Bathurst as the first of his curates there: "Having at once secured the help of a brother clergyman, Robert Bathurst, on whose goodness and friendship I could fully reckon, I began my reign at Pluckley."

Subsequently, Bathurst was rector of Birchanger in Essex from 1851 to 1864, then vicar of Brockworth from 1864 to 1871, and rector of Matson, Gloucestershire from 1871 to 1875. He died in Eastbourne, Sussex in 1906 aged 89.

Bathurst married in 1852 Jane Harkness, eldest daughter of the Rev. Robert Harkness.

== Cricketer ==
Bathurst made six appearances for the Oxford University cricket team, playing against both the Cambridge and Marylebone Cricket Club teams. A batsman of unknown handedness, Bathurst opened the batting for his University team, scoring fifty-five runs across twelve innings at a low average of 4.58 runs and a best of 22.

Outside of the University team, Bathurst also played for his alma mater, Winchester College, against teams from Eton and Harrow.
