= Roentgen =

Röntgen or Roentgen may refer to:

- Roentgen (unit), unit of measurement for ionizing radiation, named after Wilhelm Röntgen
- Wilhelm Röntgen (1845–1923), German physicist, discoverer of X-rays
- Abraham Roentgen (1711–1793), German cabinetmaker
- David Roentgen (1743–1807), German cabinetmaker, son of Abraham Roentgen
- Gerhard Moritz Roentgen (1795–1852), Dutch and German entrepreneur and engineer
- Engelbert Röntgen (1829–1897), German-Dutch violinist
- Heinrich Röntgen (1787–1813), German explorer
- Julius Röntgen (1855–1932), German-Dutch composer of classical music, son of Engelbert Röntgen
- Kevin Roentgen, musician, singer with American rock band Orson
- Roentgen (album), by Japanese singer Hyde

== See also ==
- Röntgen rays, alternative name for x-rays
- Roentgenium, chemical element, atomic number 111 (previously unununium)
- Astronomical Roentgen Telescope
