= Anomalistics =

Investigation of anomalous or paranormal phenomena

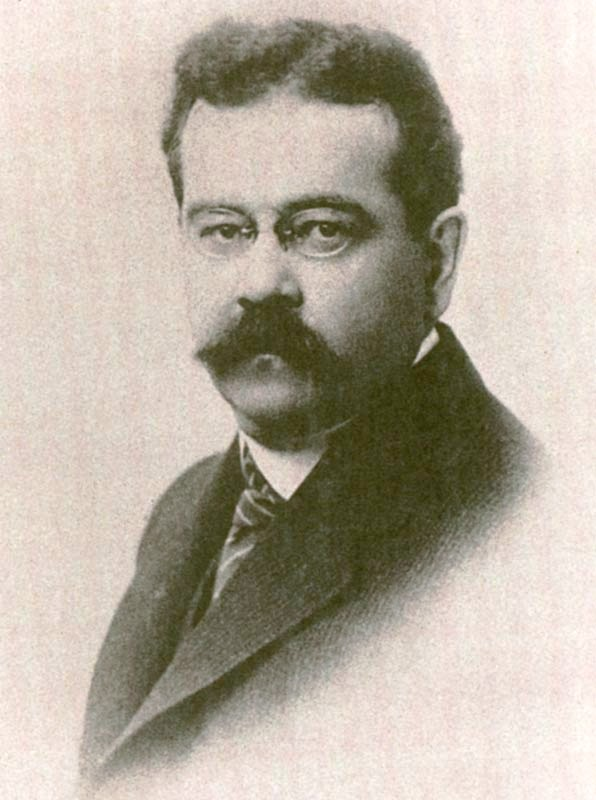
Charles Fort, anomalistics pioneer

Anomalistics is the use of scientific methods to evaluate anomalies (phenomena that fall outside current understanding), with the aim of finding a rational explanation. The term itself was coined in 1973 by Drew University anthropologist Roger W. Wescott, who defined it as being the "serious and systematic study of all phenomena that fail to fit the picture of reality provided for us by common sense or by the established sciences."

Wescott credited journalist and researcher Charles Fort as being the founding father of anomalistics as a field of research, and he named biologist Ivan T. Sanderson and Sourcebook Project compiler William R. Corliss as being instrumental in expanding anomalistics to introduce a more conventional perspective into the field.

Henry Bauer, emeritus professor of science studies at Virginia Tech, writes that anomalistics is "a politically correct term for the study of bizarre claims", while David J. Hess of the Department of Science and Technology Studies at the Rensselaer Polytechnic Institute describes it as being "the scientific study of anomalies defined as claims of phenomena not generally accepted by the bulk of the scientific community."

Anomalistics covers several sub-disciplines, including ufology, cryptozoology, and parapsychology. Researchers involved in the field have included ufologist J. Allen Hynek and cryptozoologist Bernard Heuvelmans, and parapsychologist John Hayes.

== Field ==
According to Marcello Truzzi, Professor of Sociology at Eastern Michigan University, anomalistics works on the principles that "unexplained phenomena exist", but that most can be explained through the application of scientific scrutiny. Further, that something remains plausible until it has been conclusively proven not only implausible but actually impossible, something that science does not do. In 2000, he wrote that anomalistics has four basic functions:

1. to aid in the evaluation of a wide variety of anomaly claims proposed by protoscientists;
2. to understand better the process of scientific adjudication and to make that process both more just and rational;
3. to build a rational conceptual framework for both categorizing and accessing anomaly claims; and
4. to act in the role of amicus curiae ("friend of the court") to the scientific community in its process of adjudication.

== Scope ==
In the view of Truzzi, anomalistics has two core tenets governing its scope:

1. Research must remain within the conventional boundaries; and
2. Research must deal exclusively with "empirical claims of the extraordinary", rather than claims of a "metaphysical, theological or supernatural" nature.

According to Wescott, anomalistics is also concerned with ostensibly paranormal phenomena, such as apparitions and poltergeists, or "psi" (parapsychology, e.g., ESP, psychokinesis and telepathy).

== Validation ==
According to Truzzi, before an explanation can be considered valid within anomalistics, it must fulfill four criteria. It must be based on conventional knowledge and reasoning; it must be kept simple and be unburdened by speculation or overcomplexity; the burden of proof must be placed on the claimant and not the researcher; and the more extraordinary the claim, the higher the level of proof required.

Bauer states that nothing can be deemed proof within anomalistics unless it can gain "acceptance by the established disciplines".

== Computational approaches ==
Recent work has applied computational text analysis to large, citizen-compiled anomaly databases in an effort to identify recurring descriptive patterns across reports and time periods. In a 2025 study, Luke J. Matthews used machine-learning methods (including lexical clustering and large language model–assisted theme coding) to compare multiple historical and modern anomaly datasets, including UFO/UAP reports, and argued that some report features recur across diverse sources.

== See also ==
- Association for the Scientific Study of Anomalous Phenomena (ASSAP)
