= Lo! =

1931 book by Charles Fort

- First UK edition
- Author: Charles Hoy Fort
- Language: English
- Genre: Paranormal
- Publisher: Claude Kendall (US); Victor Gollancz Ltd. (UK)
- Publication date: 1931
- Media type: Print (hardback & paperback)
- Pages: 416 pp (2004 paperback)
- ISBN: 1-59605-028-4 (2004 edition, paperback)
- OCLC: 58975446
- LC Class: Q173 .F715 2004
- Preceded by: New Lands
- Followed by: Wild Talents

Lo! is the third published nonfiction work of the author Charles Fort (first edition 1931). In it he details a wide range of unusual phenomena. In the final chapter of the book he proposes a new cosmology that the earth is stationary in space and surrounded by a solid shell which is "not unthinkably far away".

== Overview ==
Of Fort's four books, this volume deals most frequently and scathingly with astronomy (continuing from his previous book New Lands). The book also deals extensively with other subjects, including paranormal phenomena (see parapsychology), which were explored in his first book, The Book of the Damned.

In Lo!, Fort coined the now-popular term "teleportation". He also tied his previous statements on what he referred to as the Super-Sargasso Sea into his beliefs on teleportation. He would later expand this theory to include purported mental and psychic phenomena in his fourth and final book, Wild Talents.

It takes its derisive title from what he regarded as the tendency of astronomers to make positivistic, overly precise, and premature announcements of celestial events and discoveries. Fort portrays them as quack prophets, sententiously pointing towards the skies and saying "Lo!".

Lo! has been described as Fort's "most accessible, most readable book". It is divided into two sections: the first on the above phenomena; the second, on his attacks on the contemporary astronomy. The reason for this is that Fort had been working on a follow-up to The Book of the Damned, but he scrapped the idea and incorporated many of the subjects into this one.

Lo! is used extensively in Blue Balliett's book Chasing Vermeer.

== Part One: Teleportation ==
Fort establishes his thesis for this particular book early on—that some sort of mysterious force, known as the "cosmic joker" (sic), is responsible for the teleportation of people, animals, and materials. This thesis would be revised later to accommodate Fort's research on psychic phenomena in Wild Talents.

Fort starts the book largely where he left off in The Book of the Damned: mysterious falls of animals and strange materials, flying stones, poltergeist activity, etc., and incorporates these strange phenomena into his new theory on teleportation, saying that teleportation from the Super-Sargasso Sea can explain these phenomena. Fort also briefly touches on UFOs again in this book, and writes extensively on a number of other topics which he claims can be explained by teleportation: cryptozoology and various out of place animals, animal mutilations and attacks on people, strange swarming of balls, the emergence of various strange people (the famous cases of Princess Caraboo and Kaspar Hauser), and the mysterious disappearances of others (including the diplomat Benjamin Bathurst, and vessels such as the Mary Celeste, Carroll A. Deering, and USS Cyclops, presaging later interest in the Bermuda Triangle phenomenon). He writes a chapter on the winter of 1904–1905 in Britain, when a widespread religious revival in England and Wales coincided with numerous other strange occurrences: the appearances of ghosts, poltergeists, a few purported cases of Spontaneous Human Combustion, and a ravenous predator mutilating sheep and other farm animals in Northumberland.

Fort believed that all of these anomalous phenomena can be explained by his teleportation theory—though he later apparently retracts this theory to an extent in his final book, Wild Talents.

== Part Two: Astronomy ==
Fort was sceptical of Albert Einstein's theories of relativity and the claim that these could be confirmed by a transit of the Sun. He was sceptical of the accuracy of the mathematics and the observations involved, and pointed out seeming contradictions and anomalies in scientists' statements to the press.

== Publication ==
Lo! was published in February 1931. It received positive reviews in both the New York Times and the New York Herald Tribune and quickly went into a third printing.

== Availability ==
The book was re-released in a paperback version in the 1990s, and is also included in The Complete Works Of Charles Fort with Fort's other paranormal writings.

== See also ==
- Charles Fort
- Tiffany Thayer
