= T. Peter Park =

American historian

T. Peter Park (born Tiidu Peter Park, 1941) is an historian, a former librarian, and a prolific Fortean commentator on anomalous phenomena. According to Chris Perridas, Park is "a foremost Fortean authority on H. P. Lovecraft and the cultural impact his writing has had on our culture through folklore."

Born in Estonia, Park has lived most of his life in the United States. He received a Master's degree in history from the University of Virginia in 1965 and a Masters of Library Science from the University of Maryland College Park in 1972 His Master's thesis was a comparison of the racial views of John Stuart Mill and Thomas Carlyle. In 1970, he received a PhD in Modern European history from the University of Virginia. His PhD dissertation, entitled "The European reaction to the execution of Francisco Ferrer," described and analyzed the protests to the execution of a Spanish anarchist educator. He has a strong interest in anomalous phenomena, philosophy, linguistics, social psychology, and the history of social and scientific world views. He currently lives on Long Island, New York.

In an email to a Fortean LISTSERV, Park described his approach towards anomalous phenomena as "basically 'open-minded hard science'".

I find cultural attitudes toward anomalous phenomena as intriguing as the phenomena themselves. I think many Fortean mysteries (e.g., ESP, ghosts, UFO's, abductions, "Bigfoot" and other "Hairy Hominids," "Nessie" and other Lake Monsters, etc.) do involve genuine, fascinating scientific or even cosmological puzzles--but also reflect social and cultural attitudes, tensions, and conflicts, as well. I have a basically "open-minded hard science" approach to things like UFOs, abductions, "Hairy Hominids," and "Lake Monsters," tending to favor extraterrestrial and unknown-animals explanations for whatever defies a more mundane explanation--but I'm also still open to parapsychological, "paraphysical," or "metaphysical" explanations as well, for the more truly weird and bizarre cases. However, if "psychic" or "metaphysical" explanations don't seem to be really called for, but something rather unusual was still seen, I would still favor a "nuts and bolts" ETH ufology and a "flesh and blood, fur and feathers" cryptozoology in preference to occultist approaches. I think the modern "mainstream" scientific world-picture is mostly correct so far as it stands, but also quite incomplete--with paranormal and "Fortean" phenomena pointing to some of its gaps and omissions. In my own outlook and orientation, I personally very much straddle the "Two Cultures" of "mainstream" academic, scholarly, scientific, and literary "high culture" on the one hand, and of parapsychology and Forteanism on the other.

In a 2006 article in Fate magazine entitled "Little Men, Hobbits, and Ultra-Pygmies", Park discussed the Homo floresiensis find with cross-cultural legends of little people.

== Works ==
- Untitled letter in response to "Air Force Academy" Harpers Feb 1963
- "Thomas Carlyle and the Jews" Journal of European Studies, Vol. 20 (1990), pp. 1–21.
- "Jews", "Ireland", "Edward Gibbon" and "France" in The Carlyle Encyclopedia, edited by Mark Cumming Fairleigh Dickinson University Press ISBN 0-8386-3792-2
- John Stuart Mill, Thomas Carlyle, and the U.S. Civil War The Historian, 1991 Volume 54 Issue 1, Pages 93 – 106
- "Too Many Anomalies, Not Enough Time" The Anomalist:5 (1997) p. 4-7
- "Carlyle and the American Civil War" Carlyle studies annual, p. 124 (1999)
- "H.P. Lovecraft's 'Innsmouth' and Real-life Merbeings"
- "A Little Church Around the Corner: Rambling Reflections on Religious Pluralism"
- "H.P. Lovecraft: An Abductee?"
- "Two Forteanisms: Scientific Vs. Fringe" UFO Evidence "Unsorted Documents 4"
- "The 'Lincoln Legend': A 'Forme Fruste' Urban Legend" The Anomalist 1999
- "Vanishing Vanishings" The Anomalist 7 Winter 1998/99
- "Sky Visions, Ghost Riders, and Phantom Armies" in The Anomalist, No. 10 (2002)
- "Cycles fortéens: adieu sirènes, bonjour crop circles?" La Gazette Fortéenne Volume 3 (2004)
- "Proto-World Languages and Pidgins/Creoles as IAL Models" The World Language Process Symposium at AILA 15th World Congress of Applied Linguistics August 24–29, 2008 University Duisburg-Essen Essen, Germany
