= Salvatorian College =

Coordinates: 51°36′00″N 0°20′21″W

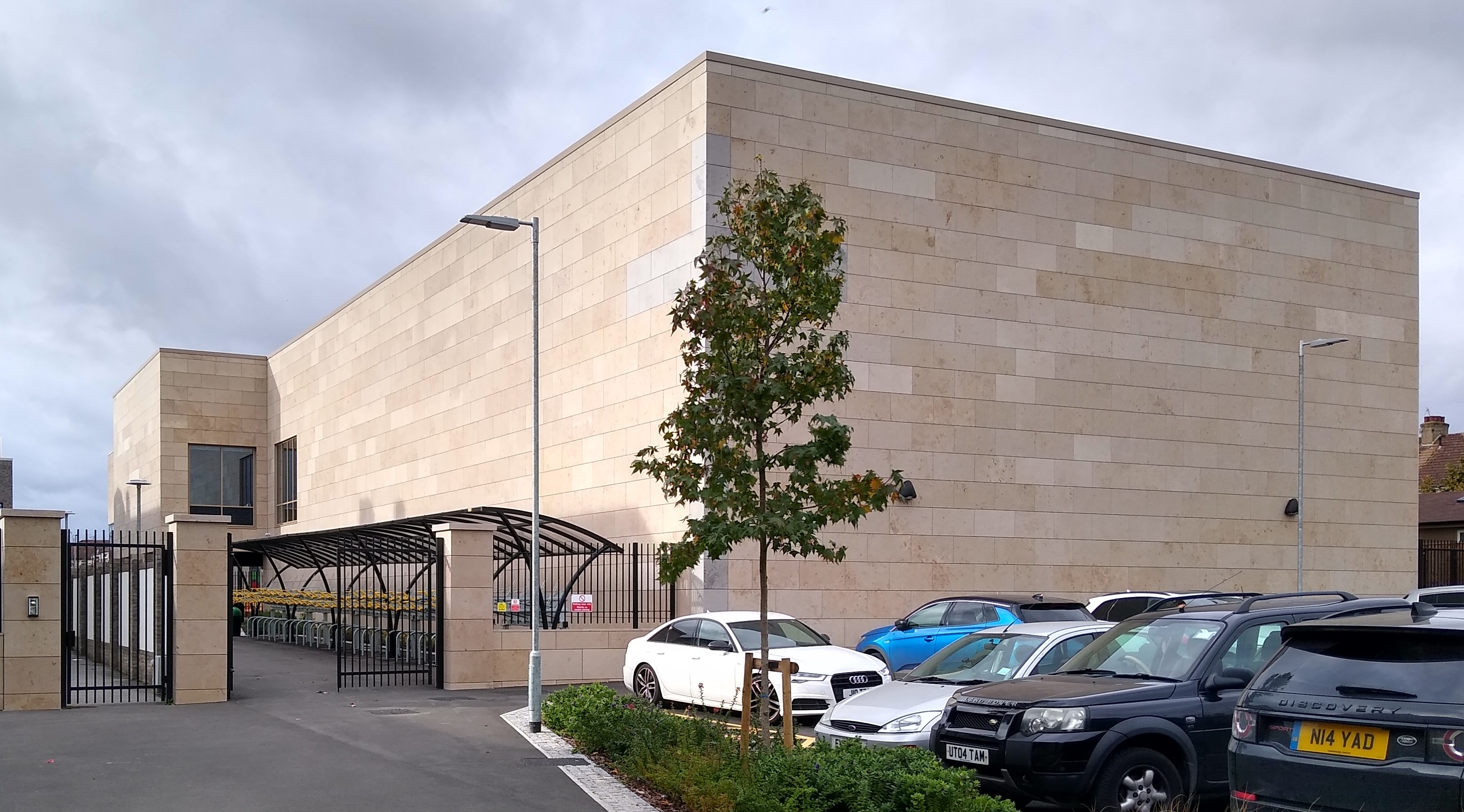

Location
- High Road; Harrow, London, HA3 5DY; England

Information
- Type: Academy
- Motto: Deo Duce (Latin) ('God is my leader')
- Religious affiliation: Roman Catholic
- Established: 1926
- Founder: Gabriel Enderle
- Department for Education URN: 138458 Tables
- Ofsted: Reports
- Headteacher: Alan Bryant
- Gender: Boys
- Age: 11 to 18
- Enrolment: 807
- Houses: Alban; Beckett; Campion; Francis; Gabriel; Teresa
- Colour: Green (dark green)
- Former pupils: Old Salvos
- Website: www.salvatoriancollege.com

Salvatorian College is an academy for boys between the ages of 11–18, situated in Wealdstone in the London Borough of Harrow, founded by Gabriel Enderley. The spiritual founder of the college is considered to be Francis Mary of the Cross Jordan.

== History ==
Salvatorian College was founded in 1926 by the Salvatorian Brothers. They had come to Harrow in 1901 and established a small parish dedicated to Saint Joseph. It was not until 1926 that the community was big enough to warrant the opening of a school. The grammar school opened in September that year with thirteen boys and Cuthbert Smith as the first headmaster. Shortly after, a prep (preparatory) department for boys aged 8–11 was opened as pupil numbers grew. Under the tripartite system, it attained voluntary aided grammar school status in 1961. The prep department was closed that same year.

With the abolition of the tripartite system and Harrow LEA adopting the three-tier system in 1979, the sixth form was closed and consolidated into the coeducational St Dominic's Sixth Form College, formerly a convent grammar school for girls in Harrow run by the Dominican Sisters, while the college became a comprehensive school for boys aged 12 to 16, although the entry age later became 11 when Harrow Council reverted to the two-tier system in line with other London boroughs. The first lay headmaster/headteacher was appointed in 1981, and most teachers are lay staff, but the school remains under the trusteeship of the Salvatorians, whose provincial office is located down the road from the school, and the provincial priest serves as vice chair of governors.

The college was a grant-maintained school until the scheme was abolished, and it switched to become a voluntary aided school. In 2012, the school became an academy.

Between 2017 and 2020 the school underwent a complete rebuild.

=== Former headmasters/headteachers ===
- Cuthbert Smith (1926–1937)
- Xavier Howard (1937–1947)
- Thomas Hennessey (1947–1961)
- Dominic Crilly (1961–1981)
- John Montgomery (1981–1987)
- Kevin Wehrle (1987–1999)
- Andrew Graham (1999–2012)
- Paul Kassapian (2012–2017)
- Alan Bryant (head of school) (2017–)
- Martin Tissot (executive headteacher) (2017–)

== Houses ==
In the school there is a house system which students are placed into at the beginning of their school career; they are Alban, Beckett, Campion, Teresa, Francis and Gabriel.

== Notable former pupils ==
- Mike Costin (b. 1929) - Co-founder of Cosworth Engineering and a key engineer at the founding period of Lotus Engineering
- Albert Welling (b. 1952) - TV and stage actor
- Tony McNulty (b. 1958) - Politician of the Labour Party
- Paul Staines (b. 1967) - British right-wing political blogger who publishes the Guido Fawkes website
- Kevin Fong (b. 1971) - Lecturer, scientific advisor to the British National Space Centre, course organiser, television presenter, writer
- Richard Langley (b. 1979) - Professional footballer
- Adrian Mariappa (b. 1986) - Professional footballer
