= William R. Corliss =

American physicist and writer

- Born: August 28, 1926; Stamford, Connecticut
- Died: July 8, 2011 (aged 84)
- Education: Physics, Bsc (Rensselaer Polytechnic Institute, 1950): Physics, M. Sc (University of Colorado, 1953)
- Occupation: Writer: Anomalistics
- Organization: AAAS

William Roger Corliss (August 28, 1926 – July 8, 2011) was an American physicist and writer who was known for his interest in collecting data regarding anomalous phenomena (including cryptozoology, out-of-place artifacts and unidentified flying objects). Corliss was Charles Fort's most direct successor. Arthur C. Clarke described Corliss as "Fort's latter-day - and much more scientific - successor."

== Biography ==
=== Sourcebook Project ===
Starting in 1974, Corliss published a number of works in the "Sourcebook Project". Each volume was devoted to a scientific field (archeology, astronomy, geology, et cetera) and featured articles culled almost exclusively from scientific journals. Corliss was inspired by Charles Fort, who decades earlier also collected reports of unusual phenomena.

Many of the articles in Corliss's works were earlier mentioned in Charles Fort's works. Unlike Fort, known for his idiosyncratic writing style, Corliss initially offered little in the way of his own opinions or editorial comments, preferring to let the articles speak for themselves. Corliss quoted all relevant parts of articles (often reprinting entire articles or stories, including illustrations). In some of his later Sourcebook efforts, such as the mid-1990s Biological Anomalies series, Corliss added his evaluation of both the reliability of the claims, and their ranking as anomalies. Well-documented reports from credible sources are ranked as a "1" while entirely unsubstantiated reports are rated as a "4", with "2" or "3" representing intermediate reports. Similarly, Corliss's uses a rating of "1" for anomalies that cannot be explained by existing scientific theories, while a "4" describes phenomena that are unusual but do not challenge scientific theories.

=== Other works ===
Corliss wrote many other books and articles, notably including 13 educational books about astronomy, outer space and space travel for NASA and a similar number for the Atomic Energy Commission and the National Science Foundation.

== Reception ==
In his book Unexplained!, Jerome Clark describes Corliss as "essentially conservative in outlook". He explains, "Corliss [is] more interested in unusual weather, ball lighting, geophysical oddities, extraordinary mirages, and the like — in short, anomalies that, while important in their own right, are far less likely to outrage mainstream scientists than those that delighted Fort, such as UFOs, monstrous creatures, or other sorts of extraordinary events and entities."

Arthur C. Clarke said:

Unlike Fort, Corliss selected his material almost exclusively from scientific journals like Nature and Science, not newspapers, so it has already been subjected to a filtering process which would have removed most hoaxes and reports from obvious cranks. Nevertheless, there is much that is quite baffling in some of these reports from highly reputable sources.

The meteorologist Charles A. Doswell has praised the research of Corliss, stating his documentation of anomalies was intriguing. However, the geologist Henry Faul has criticized Corliss. In a review for Handbook of Unusual Natural Phenomena, Faul noted:

[Corliss] is particularly prone, to classify things as "unexplained" even when a good explanation is available... Grossly incomplete, naively uncritical, supplied with inaccurate sketches (many of them fictitious, like the illustrations in old novels), and lacking an author index, it is no handbook at all. Instead of giving new access to genuinely mysterious observations, it only buries a few of them in a clutter of confused esoterica.

In a review for a book that documented astronomical anomalies, the astronomer Joseph Veverka wrote that Corliss had shown negligence of the scientific literature for more than a decade and made incorrect statements. However, Richard Baum wrote a mostly positive review, stating that it was an objective work and "his reviews are concise and well-referenced, and if on occasion his examples are questionable we do at least have the benefit of the bibliographies which will be useful to historians."

Science journalist Jeremy Cherfas in the New Scientist, suggested that Corliss' book Incredible Life had an agenda to challenge evolutionary theory as he believed that natural selection fails to explain biological mysteries. Science writer John Gribbin positively reviewed Corliss' book Unknown Earth in the New Scientist, stating it was a "delightful mixture of established science, and the lunatic fringe... Where else can you get such entertainment at so little cost?".

== Bibliography ==
Books published include:

- Propulsion Systems for Spaceflight (1960)
- Radioisotopic Power Generation (with D. G. Harvey; 1964)
- Space Probes and Planetary Exploration (1965)
- Scientific Satellites (1967)
- Mysteries of the Universe (1967)
- Teleoperator Controls (with E. G. Johnsen; 1968)
- Mysteries Beneath the Sea (1970)
- Human Factors Applications in Teleoperator Design and Operation (with Johnsen; 1971)
- History of NASA Sounding Rockets (1971)
- Man and Atom (with Glenn T. Seaborg; 1971)
- History of the Goddard Networks (1972)
- The Interplanetary Pioneers (1972)
- Strange Phenomena: A Sourcebook of Unusual Natural Phenomena (1974)
- Strange Artifacts: A Sourcebook on Ancient Man (1974)
- The Unexplained (1976)
- Strange Life (1976)
- Strange Minds (1976)
- Strange Universe (1977)
- Handbook of Unusual Natural Phenomena (1977)
- Strange Planet (1978)
- Ancient Man: A Handbook of Puzzling Artifacts (1978)
- Mysterious Universe: A Handbook of Astronomical Anomalies (1979)
- Unknown Earth: A Handbook of Geological Enigmas (1980)
- Wind Tunnels of NASA (1981)
- Incredible Life: A Handbook of Biological Mysteries (1981)
- The Unfathomed Mind: A Handbook of Unusual Mental Phenomena (1982)
- Lightning, Auroras, Nocturnal Lights, and Related Luminous Phenomena (1982)
- Tornados, Dark Days, Anomalous Precipitation, and Related Weather Phenomena (1983)
- Earthquakes, Tides, Unidentified Sounds, and Related Phenomena (1983)
- Rare Halos, Mirages, Anomalous Rainbows, and Related Electromagnetic Phenomena (1984)
- The Moon and the Planets (1985)
- The Sun and Solar System Debris (1986)
- Stars, Galaxies, Cosmos (1987)
- Carolina Bays, Mima Mounds, Submarine Canyons (1988)
- Anomalies in Geology: Physical, Chemical, Biological (1989)
- Neglected Geological Anomalies (1990)
- Inner Earth: A Search for Anomalies (1991)
- Biological Anomalies: Humans I (1992)
- Biological Anomalies: Humans II (1993)
- Biological Anomalies: Humans III (1994)
- Science Frontiers: Some Anomalies and Curiosities of Nature (1994)
- Biological Anomalies: Mammals I (1995)
- Biological Anomalies: Mammals II (1996)
- Biological Anomalies: Birds (1998)
- Ancient Infrastructure: Remarkable Roads, Mines, Walls, Mounds, Stone Circles: A Catalog of Archeological Anomalies (1999)
- Ancient Structures: Remarkable Pyramids, Forts, Towers, Stone Chambers, Cities, Complexes: A Catalog of Archeological Anomalies (2001)
- Remarkable Luminous Phenomena in Nature: A Catalog of Geophysical Anomalies (2001)
- Scientific Anomalies and other Provocative Phenomena (2003)
- Archeological Anomalies: Small Artifacts (2003)
- Archeological Anomalies: Graphic Artifacts I (2005)
