= Amy Morant =

British political activist

Amy Constance Morant (1864 – 1918) was a British political activist who moved from liberalism to socialism.

Born in Hampstead, Morant was the younger sister of Robert Laurie Morant. She won scholarships to study at Bedford College, London, and Newnham College, Cambridge. From 1887 to 1888, she worked with unemployed people in London, and this led her to become involved in the Women's Liberal Federation, for which she became an organiser. She also translated a number of German works on the social sciences, and wrote her own poetry.

In the 1890s, Morant left the Liberal Party and joined both the Independent Labour Party and the Social Democratic Federation. She wrote a pamphlet about her experience, "Liberalism unveiled; or, a Creed without a Programme".
