= Benjamin Bathurst (diplomat) =

British diplomat (1784 – c. 1809)

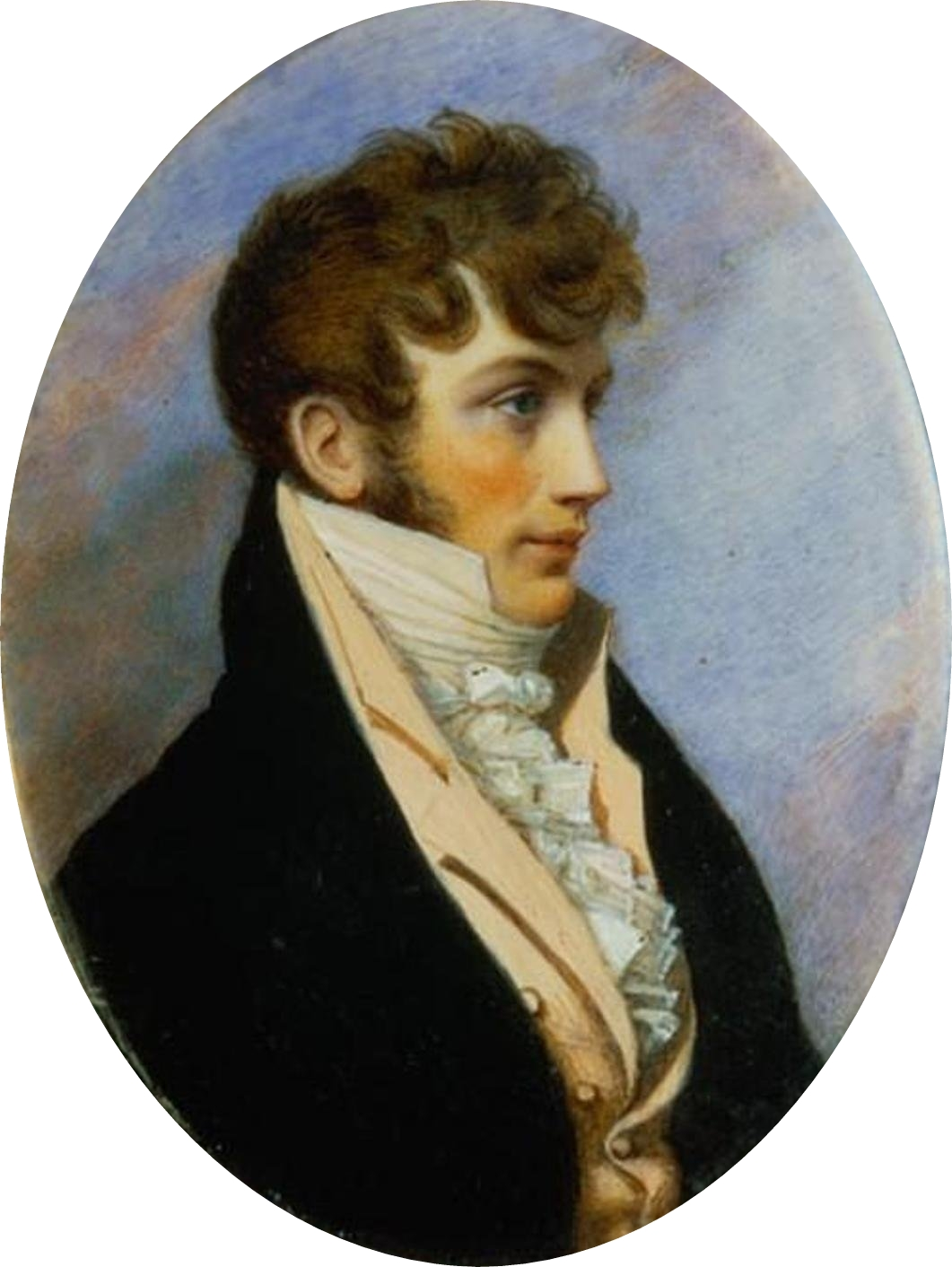
- Born: 18 March 1784; London, Great Britain
- Disappeared: 25 November 1809 (aged 25); Perleberg, Prussia
- Occupation: Diplomatic envoy
- Spouse: Phillida Call
- Parent(s): Henry Bathurst, Bishop of Norwich

Benjamin Bathurst (born 18 March 1784 – disappeared 25 November 1809) was a British diplomat who disappeared in Prussia during the Napoleonic Wars. He was the third son of Henry Bathurst, Bishop of Norwich. His sister was the poet Caroline de Crespigny.

Bathurst's disappearance in 1809 sparked much debate and speculation about his ultimate fate. His story is frequently used in science fiction stories, based on a widespread belief (fostered by secondary sources) that his disappearance was particularly sudden, perhaps supernatural, in nature. Modern research suggests the circumstances of Bathurst's disappearance were wildly embellished, and that he was almost certainly murdered.

== Career ==
Benjamin Bathurst was educated at Winchester College (scholar in 1797) and New College, Oxford (matriculated in 1799, graduated in 1803).

He entered the diplomatic service at an early age and was promoted to the post of Secretary of the British Legation at Livorno in what was then the Grand Duchy of Tuscany (now Italy). In 1805 he married Phillida Call, daughter of Sir John Call, a Cornish landowner and baronet.

In 1809, Bathurst was dispatched to Vienna, Austria, as an envoy by his relative Henry Bathurst, pro tempore Secretary for Foreign Affairs. His mission was to assist in the reconstruction of the alliance between Austria and the United Kingdom and to try to encourage Austrian Emperor Francis I to declare war on France, which the emperor did in April. However, the Austrians were forced to abandon Vienna and ultimately sued for peace following their defeat at the Battle of Wagram in July. Bathurst was promptly recalled to London and decided that the safest route was to travel north and take a ship from Hamburg, Prussia.

=== Disappearance ===
On 25 November 1809, Bathurst and his courier, a Herr Krause, who were travelling by chaise under the aliases of "Baron de Koch" and "Fischer" respectively, stopped at the town of Perleberg, west of Berlin. After ordering fresh horses at the post house, Bathurst and Krause walked to a nearby inn, the White Swan. After ordering an early dinner, Bathurst is said to have spent several hours writing in a small room set aside for him at the inn. The travellers' departure was delayed, and it was not until 9pm that they were told that the horses were about to be harnessed to their carriage. Bathurst immediately left his room, followed shortly afterwards by Krause, who was surprised to find Bathurst was not in the chaise when he reached it and indeed was nowhere to be found.

Bathurst's disappearance did not create much excitement immediately, since Prussia was inundated with bandits, stragglers from Napoleon's army and German revolutionaries. Additionally, murders and robberies were so common that the loss of one commercial traveller (which Bathurst was travelling as) was barely noticed. News of the disappearance did not reach England for some weeks, after Krause had managed to board a ship in Hamburg. In December Bathurst's father, Henry Bathurst, Bishop of Norwich, received a summons from Foreign Secretary Richard Wellesley to attend him at Apsley House, where Wellesley informed the Bishop of his son's disappearance.

Bathurst's wife Phillida immediately left for Prussia to search for her husband, accompanied by the explorer Heinrich Röntgen. They arrived at Perleberg to find that the authorities had been looking into the affair and that a Captain von Klitzing had been put in charge of the investigation. After Klitzing was notified of Bathurst's disappearance, he took immediate steps to mobilise his troops and conducted a vigorous search, apparently working on the initial assumption that the missing man had vanished of his own accord. On 26 November 1809, the River Stepenitz was dragged, and civilian officials ordered a second search of the village. The following day, Bathurst's valuable fur coat – worth 200 or 300 Prussian thalers – was discovered hidden in an outhouse owned by a family named Schmidt. Then, on 16 December 1809, two old women out scavenging in the woods near Quitzow, three miles (4.8 km) north of Perleberg, came across Bathurst's pantaloons.

Investigation quickly revealed that one August Schmidt had been working as hostler in the courtyard of the White Swan on the night Bathurst disappeared. Bathurst's coat was found in Schmidt's possession. Frau Kestern, a woman employed at the German Coffee House, testified years later that immediately after Bathurst had visited the establishment, August had come in, asked her where the visitor had gone, then hastened after him and (she supposed) taken some opportunity to murder him.

A reward of 500 thalers was offered for any news of Bathurst's whereabouts, and money was paid to members of the local police to expedite matters. This, however, caused the waters to be muddied as many false reports and offers of information were made by people seeking a share of the reward. In March, Phillida had the entire area of Perleberg searched at vast expense, which included the use of trained dogs, but her efforts were to no avail. She then travelled to Berlin and then Paris (under special safe conduct since Britain and France were then at war) to see Napoleon Bonaparte himself, hoping to obtain from him some account of her husband's fate. However, when she was received by Napoleon, he declared his ignorance of the affair and offered his assistance.

=== Contemporary press reports ===
By January 1810, the English and French press had become aware of Bathurst's disappearance and had begun to discuss it. The Times published a piece that month which subsequently appeared in other English newspapers:

There is too much reason to fear that the account of the death of Mr Bathurst, late envoy to the Emperor of Austria, inserted in a Paris journal, is correct as to the principal fact. It was stated, as an article of Berlin news, of the date of December 10, that Mr Bathurst had evinced symptoms of insanity on his journey through the city, and that he had subsequently fallen by his own hand in the vicinity of Perleberg. Information, however, has been received within these few days, which forcibly tends to fix the guilt of Mr Bathurst's death, or disappearance, on the French Government. It appears that Mr Bathurst left Berlin with passports from the Prussian Government, and in excellent health, both of mind and body. He was to proceed to Hamburg, but Hamburg he never reached. At some town near the French territories he was seized, as is supposed, by a party of French soldiers. What happened afterwards is not accurately known. His pantaloons have been found near the town where he was seized, and a letter in them to his wife; but nothing else. The Prussian Government, upon receiving the intelligence, evinced the deepest regret, and offered a large reward for the discovery of his body. No success, however, has attended the offer.

— The Times, 20 January 1810

The French government was agitated by the accusation that they had kidnapped or murdered Bathurst and replied in their official journal, Le Moniteur Universel:

England alone, among all civilised nations, has renewed the example of paying assassins and encouraging crimes. It appears by the accounts from Berlin, that Mr Bathurst was deranged in his mind. This is the custom of the British Cabinet – to give their diplomatic missions to the most foolish and senseless persons the nation produces. The English diplomatic corps is the only one in which examples of madness are common.

— Le Moniteur Universel, 29 January 1810

=== 1852 discovery ===
On 15 April 1852, during the demolition of a house near Perleberg, located three hundred paces from the White Swan, a skeleton was discovered under the threshold of the stable. The back of the skull showed a fracture as though from the blow of a heavy instrument. All of the upper teeth were perfect, but one of the lower molars showed signs of having been removed by a dentist. The owner of the house, a stonemason named Kiesewetter, had purchased the house in 1834 from Christian Mertens, who had been a serving man at the White Swan during the period when Bathurst disappeared. Bathurst's sister travelled to Perleberg but could not conclusively say whether or not the skull belonged to her brother.

=== Recent investigation ===
A detailed investigation conducted by writer Mike Dash, first published in the Fortean Times in 1990, concluded that the allegedly mysterious details of Bathurst's disappearance had been greatly exaggerated over the years and that he was almost certainly murdered.

== References in pop culture ==
Stanley J. Weyman's 1924 novel The Traveller in the Fur Cloak is based on the murder of Bathurst. The action in the later part of the novel is set in Perleberg, which is described in such detail that one assumes the author had visited the town. Bathurst's case is also mentioned by Charles Fort in his book Lo!.

=== In science fiction ===
- In Eric Frank Russell's 1939 science fiction novel Sinister Barrier, Bathurst is mentioned as an earlier victim of Vitons, telepathic invisible creatures ruling mankind.
- In H. Beam Piper's 1948 science fiction short story "He Walked Around the Horses", Bathurst slips into a parallel universe which diverged from ours in 1777.
- The short story "A Toy for Juliette" by Robert Bloch mentions Bathurst as being transported into the distant future where he serves to satisfy the cruel pleasures of the story's main character, Juliette.
- The short novel "Time Echo" by Lionel Roberts (a pseudonym of Lionel Fanthorpe) has Bathurst accidentally transported to a future time where his hatred of Napoleon makes him join with conspirators seeking to overthrow a cruel future conqueror and tyrant.
- Avram Davidson's novel Masters of the Maze has Bathurst as one of a select group of humans (and other sentient beings) who had penetrated to the center of a mysterious "Maze" traversing all of space and time. There he dwells in eternal repose, in company with the Biblical Enoch, the Chinese King Wen and Lao Tze, the Greek Apollonius of Tyana, and various other sages of the past and future, some of them Martians.
- In A. Bertram Chandler's Into the Alternate Universe, the protagonists' spaceship accidentally falls into "a crack between the universes", a vacuum without any matter except people (and other beings) who had fallen there earlier, and who (unless in a spaceship) suffocated instantly. Among others, they see the forever floating body of a man in 19th-century upper-class clothing, who seems to be Bathurst.
- Bathurst's disappearance is also mentioned in passing in Robert A. Heinlein's novella Elsewhen, Murray Leinster's short novel The Other World, Poul Anderson's novel Operation Chaos, Michael F. Flynn's The Forest of Time, Joel Rosenberg's Guardians of the Flame Series and Keepers of the Hidden Ways Series, Simon Hawke's TimeWars series, Jane Jensen's novel Dante's Equation, Jack L. Chalker's Changewinds Trilogy, and early in the 7 November chapter of Anthony Boucher's 1942 "detective novel" Rocket to the Morgue.
- In Kim Newman's short story "The Gypsies in the Wood", it is mentioned that the Diogenes Club investigated his disappearance.
- In The Lurker at the Threshold (1945), a short horror novel by August Derleth and H. P. Lovecraft, the disappearance of Bathurst and others, is mentioned in passing, along with Fortean phenomena, near the end.
- In Harlan Ellison's 1992 short story "The Man Who Rowed Christopher Columbus Ashore", the protagonist Levendis casually destroys all remaining evidence explaining the disappearances of Bathurst, Amelia Earhart, Jimmy Hoffa, and Ambrose Bierce, and places their bones anonymously in a "display of early American artifacts." The story was selected for inclusion in the 1993 edition of The Best American Short Stories.

== See also ==
- List of people who disappeared
