= Thomas Kirkby (painter) =

British painter (1775–1847)

Thomas Kirkby (January 1775 – c. 1847) was a British painter and draughtsman, best remembered for his portrait and landscape paintings, most notably of Henry Bathurst, William Howley, and John Wycliffe. He graduated from the Royal Academy of Arts in 1795, and exhibited there between 1796 and 1846, also exhibiting at the British Library from 1808 to 1847.
