= Henry Bathurst (priest) =

Henry Bathurst (4 May 1781 – 10 September 1844) was an Anglican priest in the 19th century.

The eldest son of Bishop Henry Bathurst, he was born in Oxford and educated at New College there. He was Rector of North Creake then Hollesley. He was Archdeacon of Norwich from 1814 until his death in Cheltenham. Sir James Bathurst and Benjamin Bathurst were his younger brothers.
