= Robert Morant =

English administrator and educationalist

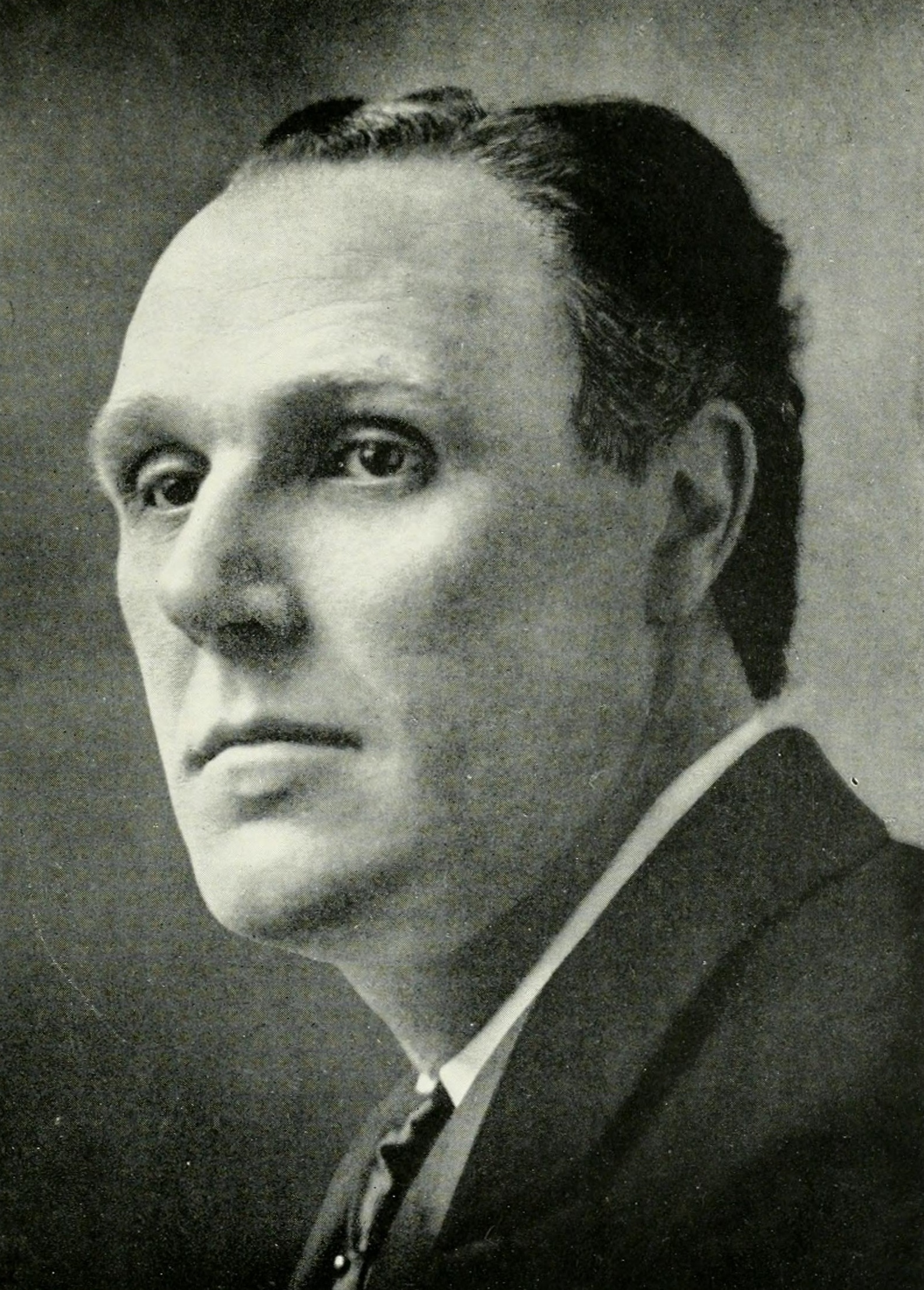
Sir Robert Laurie Morant.

Sir Robert Laurie Morant, KCB (7 April 1863 – 13 March 1920) was an English administrator and educationalist.

== Career overview ==
Born in Hampstead, Morant was the older brother of Amy Morant. He was educated at Winchester College and New College, Oxford where he took a First in Theology.

After a year teaching at a Preparatory School, he was appointed as tutor to the crown prince of Siam. On his return, he worked at the Toynbee Hall settlement in the East End of London.

He then joined a research unit reporting to the Privy Council on Education and thence to the Board of Education, where he rose rapidly and served as private secretary to Sir John Gorst, Vice-President of the Committee on Education until 1902. He was responsible for some of the new ideas in the Education Act 1902, and was appointed Permanent Secretary to the Education Board in April 1903, being thus placed in a position to ensure the Board effectively implemented the act. He was appointed a Companion of the Order of the Bath (CB) in the 1902 Coronation Honours, and promoted to Knight Commander (KCB) of the order in the 1907 Birthday Honours.

In 1905, he was involved in a dispute concerning a school inspection report by Katherine Bathurst and her outspoken views on elementary education for under-fives. This resulted in Bathurst having to resign, and for the ministry publishing her report, but with Morant's apologies and annotations.

In 1911 he was forced to resign as Permanent Secretary of the Board of Education after the leaking of a confidential report critical of school inspectors. Written by the chief inspector, it disparaged inspectors who had no more than an elementary education and recommended that inspectors should in future be drawn from Oxbridge graduates. Under pressure of work, Morant approved the report without reading it and, as a civil servant, was unable to reply to public criticism, including questions in the House of Commons, and from Edmond Holmes. He then accepted a post chairing the commission to implement the National Insurance Act 1911. This included a huge and wide-ranging task of administration and even included the foundation of the precursor of the Medical Research Council. Morant promoted and largely drafted the National Insurance Act 1913, correcting problems in the previous Act.

He served on the Haldane committee on the machinery of government, 1917–18.

When the Ministry of Health was created in 1919, he became its Permanent Secretary.

He died of influenza on 13 March 1920, aged 56.

In 1917 Beatrice Webb called him "the one man of genius in the Civil Service", and A. L. Rowse, writing in 1942, said he was "by universal acclaim the greatest civil servant of his time".

== Family ==
In 1896, he married Helen Mary Cracknell.

Government offices
| Preceded by Sir George William Kekewich | Permanent Secretary of the Board of Education; 1903–1911 | Succeeded by Sir Amherst Selby-Bigge |
| Preceded by New post | Chairman of the National Health Insurance Commission; 1911–1919 | Succeeded by Post abolished |
| Preceded by New post | Permanent Secretary of the Ministry of Health; 1919–1920 | Succeeded by Sir (William) Arthur Robinson |
