= James Bathurst =

British Army commander

Lieutenant-General Sir James Bathurst KCB (4 May 1782 (Note: His baptism record lists 4 May as his birthdate, while Debrett's lists 3 May.) – 13 April 1850) was a British Army commander from the Bathurst family.

== Early life and family ==
Bathurst was likely born in Oxford, where he was baptised at three weeks old by his father, Henry Bathurst, then canon of Christ Church, Oxford and later Bishop of Norwich (1805–1837). James was the second son; his elder brother was Rev. Henry Bathurst while his younger brother Benjamin Bathurst, a diplomat, disappeared in 1809 in Germany and is believed to have been murdered. His father was a nephew of the 1st Earl Bathurst. His mother was Grace Coote, sister of Charles Coote, 2nd Baron Castle Coote and Sir Eyre Coote.

== Career ==
Bathurst entered the army in May 1794 as a volunteer and was promoted to ensign that December, to lieutenant in April 1795, and to captain in 1800. He served in Egypt against the French campaign and was present in the action around Alexandria with Sir Ralph Abercromby's army in Egypt, including the siege of Marabout. He purchased a commission in the 60th as a major in 1803, and he served with the 7th West India Regiment at Gibraltar and in the West Indies, including the Battle of Suriname (1804).

In 1805, he went to Hanover on the staff of Lord Cathcart, and on 10 October was appointed to the staff of the King's German Legion as Military Commissary, with the rank of lieutenant-colonel.

In 1807, he served with the Russian Army, and was present at the actions fought for the relief of Dantzig, as well as in those of Lomitten, Deppen, Gutstadt, Heilsberg, and Friedland. Sub sequently he served at Rügen and at the siege of Copenhagen in that year.

During the Peninsular War, he accompanied Sir Brent Spencer to the coast of Spain in 1808. In 1808 and 1809, he served in Portugal as assistant quartermaster-general and as aide-to-camp to the Duke of Wellington. He was present in the battles of Roliça, Vimeiro, Corunna, Talavera, and Buçaco, for which battles he had received a gold cross. He was also at the Wellington's passage of the Douro in 1809.

Bathurst was appointed a Commander of the Order of the Bath (CB) in 1815, and knighted in the same order (KCB) by William IV on 28 September 1831.

In 1816, he succeeded Lieutenant-Colonel Charles Napier as Lieutenant-Governor of the Virgin Islands.

He was appointed Governor of Berwick in 1833.

== Personal life ==
On 16 January 1815, Bathurst married Lady Caroline Stewart, daughter of the 1st Earl Castle Stewart, at St Marylebone Parish Church. They had six sons and two daughters:

- Stuart Bathurst (1815–1900), an Anglican priest who converted to Catholicism during the Oxford Movement,
- Robert Bathurst (1817–1906)
- James Peter Bathurst (1818–1893)
- Henry Allen Bathurst (1819–1897)
- Caroline Bathurst (1820–1861)
- Sarah Louisa Bathurst (1821–)
- Algernon Bathurst (1823–1895)
- Catherine Anne Bathurst a.k.a. Sister Mary Catherine Philip (1825–1907)
- Frederick Bathurst (1827–1910)

He died at Kilworth Rectory in South Kilworth, Leicestershire.

== Notes ==
Military offices
Preceded by Banastre Tarleton	Governor of Berwick-upon-Tweed; 1833–1850	Succeeded by Edward Nott as Lieutenant-Governor
