= St Dominic's Sixth Form College =

Location
- Mount Park Avenue; Harrow, Greater London, HA1 3HX; England
- Coordinates: 51°33′58″N 0°20′30″W

Information
- Type: Sixth form college Boarding (EX)
- Motto: Veritas (Truth)
- Religious affiliation: Roman Catholic
- Established: 1878 – convent
- Local authority: Harrow on the Hill
- Department for Education URN: 130443 Tables
- Ofsted: Reports
- Principal: Andrew Parkin
- Age: 16 to 19
- Enrolment: Academically Selective
- Colours: Black and White
- Website: https://www.stdoms.ac.uk

St Dominic's Sixth Form College is a selective Roman Catholic sixth form college on Harrow on the Hill, England founded in 1878, originally founded as a boarding school. The college was opened and initiated by Cardinal Hume.

The college was awarded ’Sixth Form college of the year’ from The Times newspaper in 2017.

== Grounds ==
There are five main buildings on the school grounds: the Aquinas building, the Catherine building, the Hume building, the Siena Building (Sports Hall) and the Chapel. Each of the buildings was named after a notable figure in Christian theology; Thomas Aquinas, Basil Hume and St Catherine of Siena. The Aquinas building contains the Open Access Computer suite, the Science department and the Music department. The Catherine building was the original school building and was completely remodelled to form the library, the Mathematics department, the Languages department, the IT department and the English department as well as the canteen and the Careers Office and Theatre suites. The Hume building contains the Reception, the Business studies department, the Art department, the Humanities department, an Examination hall, the admin department and various other staff rooms including the Principal's and Vice Principal's office. The Siena building has the psychology department, as well as a gym and the Sienna Hall. The chapel has services on Fridays with regular public speakers visiting the college to give lectures to students. In 2006 large covered, outside seating areas were built as the courtyard and canteen had become overcrowded. There is also a field towards the back of the site with a football pitch, and a small area with a pond which is used for fieldwork.

== History ==
The college was established in 1979 from St Dominic's Independent Grammar School for girls which had been run by nuns of the Dominican Order. Catherine Bathurst and her Sisters from Ghent set up a girls' boarding school in 1878 at the invitation of Cardinal Manning in the Mount, Harrow-on-the-Hill, moving later to a new building in the convent grounds when day pupils were admitted. In 1937 the school was extended but the boarding school closed in 1948 and the junior department shortly afterwards (Harrow, including Pinner : Education 1971). At its peak in the early 1970s the school had three form entries per school year. Over the years the sisters' involvement in the school had diminished with the dropping in the number of vocations although the school was run, until it closed, by one of the order. In the mid-1970s it became apparent that the school could not continue in its existing form with constant pressure from the Local Authority to cease any grants. Eventually plans were made to close as a school and reopen as a Catholic sixth form college. From 1975 onwards there was no new intake of girls to prepare for this time and in March 1978 Cardinal Basil Hume laid the foundation stone which is now displayed outside the Hume Building. At the same time, nearby secondary schools such as Salvatorian College lost their sixth forms with this reorganisation. In July 1979 the convent school closed and the remaining nuns transferred to the Dominican convent in Stone, Staffordshire, the convent building on Sudbury Hill having been sold the previous year for conversion to flats. The remaining students transferred whilst in the middle of O Level exams, to nearby Catholic school, Sacred Heart High School.

Over the subsequent years the site has been developed to provide facilities for the students but with the consequent loss of open space. The original tennis courts are now the Hume Building, the rounders field is now called the Siena Building which contains the new Sports Hall and Gym, the cloister garden a courtyard seating area, convent grounds the Aquinas Building and school front lawns a car park.

On the site of the grounds are the well preserved remains of an Elizabethan signal, or, watch-tower. This was part of the relatively sophisticated signal system, which was established to alert local militia and the Crown of the Spanish Fleet, or, Armada, which was spotted off the English coast in 1588. Staff and students at the College have been excavating the Beacon since 2018. Work was granted Heritage Lottery Funding.

== Academics ==
There are a variety of courses to choose from including the conventional GCE 'A' Levels and vocational BTEC Qualifications. The college has been awarded many different accolades by both universities and examining bodies and has achieved Beacon Status. In its latest Ofsted inspection all departments were rated as 'Outstanding'. It has partnerships with local secondary schools, Sacred Heart High School, Harrow and Salvatorian College.

== Notable alumni ==
- Conn Iggulden (b. 1971) – author.
- Tamara Lawrance (b. 1994) – actress.

=== St Dominic's Independent Grammar School for Girls ===
- Dilys Laye (1934–2009) – actress
- Denise O'Donoghue (b. 1955) – television production company executive

== See also ==
- St Dominic's Grammar School for Girls, Belfast
- St Dominic's High School for Girls (former), Stoke-on-Trent
