= Stuart Bathurst Catholic High School =

Secondary school in West Midlands, England

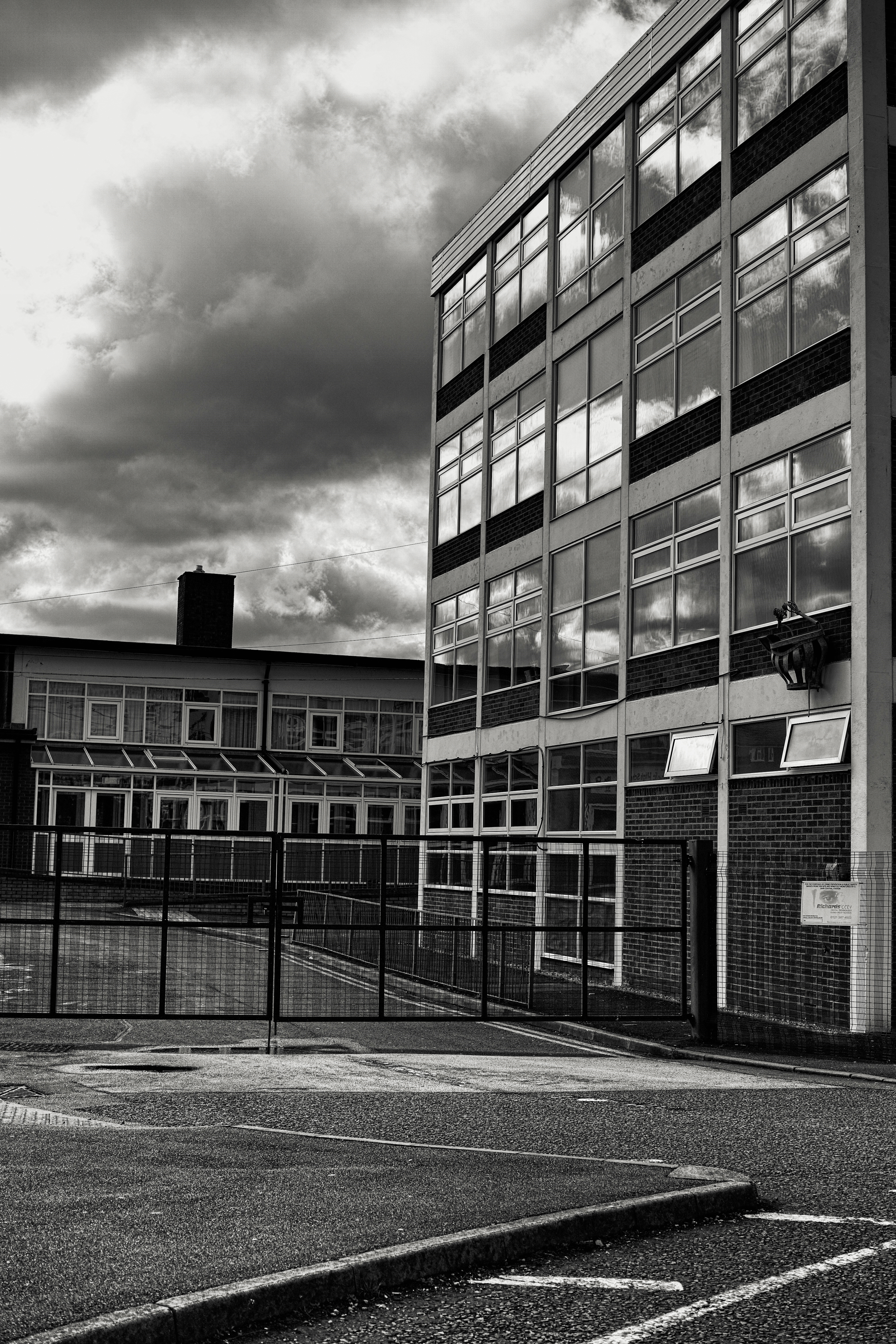

Location
- Wood Green Road; Wednesbury, West Midlands, WS10 9QS; England
- Coordinates: 52°33′52″N 2°00′20″W

Information
- Type: Academy
- Motto: Tien Ta Foy (Steadfast Faith)
- Religious affiliation: Roman Catholic
- Local authority: Sandwell
- Trust: The St John Bosco Multi-Academy Company
- Specialist: Arts
- Department for Education URN: 147881 Tables
- Ofsted: Reports
- Head of School: H. Duffield
- Gender: Co-educational
- Age: 11 to 18
- Colours: Maroon and yellow with black blazer
- Website: http://www.stuart-bathurst.org.uk

Stuart Bathurst Catholic High School is a co-educational Roman Catholic secondary school and sixth form, located in Wednesbury in the West Midlands of England. The school opened in the 1960s and is named after 19th century Catholic cleric Stuart Bathurst, and is under the jurisdiction of the Roman Catholic Archdiocese of Birmingham.

It is situated on the A461 Wood Green near Wednesbury's border with Walsall and junction 9 of the M6 motorway. Most of its pupils are from Wednesbury and neighbouring towns including West Bromwich and Walsall.

Previously a voluntary aided school administered by Sandwell Metropolitan Borough Council, in April 2020 Stuart Bathurst Catholic High School converted to academy status and is now sponsored by The St John Bosco Multi-Academy Company. The school is a specialist Arts College.

Stuart Bathurst Catholic High School offers GCSEs, BTECs and Cambridge Nationals as programmes of study for pupils, while students in the sixth form have the option to study from a range of A Levels and further BTECs.

== Notable former pupils ==
- Mark Lewis-Francis (b. 1982) – athlete, sprinter
- Simon Johnson (b. 1983) – footballer, coach
