= Heinrich Röntgen =

- Born: c. 1787
- Died: 1813 (aged 25–26); African continent
- Occupation: student
- Known for: one of four students recommended as explorers to Joseph Banks' African Association
- Notable work: In 1809, accompanied Bathurst's wife Phillida when she travelled to Germany to search for her missing diplomat husband Benjamin Bathurst

Heinrich Röntgen (c. 1787–1813), was one of four students recommended as explorers to Joseph Banks' African Association by Johann Friedrich Blumenbach, the others being Friedrich Hornemann, Ulrich Seetzen, and Johann Ludwig Burckhardt. All died in Africa.

Following the disappearance of British diplomat Benjamin Bathurst near Berlin in 1809, Röntgen accompanied Bathurst's wife Phillida when she travelled to Germany to search for her husband.
