= Haunted places in Plymouth, Massachusetts =

Plymouth, Massachusetts, called "America's Hometown" on its welcome billboards and a tourist train, is home to both Plymouth Rock and the Mayflower. It is where the pilgrims first set foot when they came to America in 1620, and where the first Thanksgiving took place. Over the past 400 years, Plymouth has grown from a small colony to a large community. With this much history in a town come stories of abandoned hospitals and old places that are now believed to be haunted. Main Street Antiques Plymouth Massachusetts.
