= Von Quitzow family =

German noble family

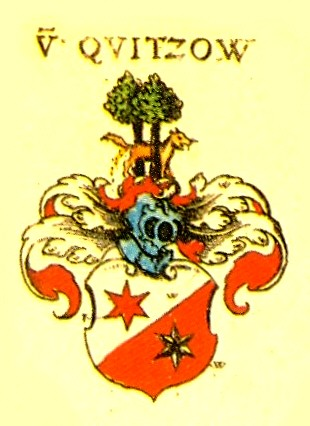
Coat of arms of the Quitzow family

The von Quitzow family is a German noble family, which originated from Brandenburg.

== History ==
The family came to power in the late fourteenth and early fifteenth century—their power was so great that this period of Brandenburg history is sometimes called the Age of the von Quitzows. Its most famous sons were the robber barons, the brothers Dietrich (born 1366) and Hans (born 1370).
