= Wild Talents (book) =

1932 book

- Title page for Wild Talents (1932)
- Author: Charles Fort
- Language: English
- Genre: Paranormal, Non-fiction
- Publication date: 1932 (first published)
- Publication place: United States

Wild Talents, published in 1932, is the fourth and final non-fiction book by the author Charles Fort, known for his writing on the paranormal.

== Overview ==
Like Fort's previous works, this book deals largely with a number of anomalous phenomena, as well as his ongoing attack on current scientific theories. The book deals for the most part with trying to fit the various phenomena described into Fort's new theory of psychic and mental power – the "Wild Talents" of the title – that are detailed below.

As did his previous book, Lo!, Wild Talents deals with a wide range of phenomena. Fort's writing style and tongue-in-cheek sense of self-deprecating humor is prominent, particularly in the section on his own purported psychic experiences, and the book is shorter than his previous works.

== The "Wild Talents" thesis ==
In recounting a wide variety of odd phenomena, Fort largely disregards his previous teleportation theory, or at least incorporates him into his new thesis. Rather than a vague "Cosmic joker", as he postulated in his earlier books, the responsibility for these occurrences are freak powers that occur in the human mind, that cannot be naturally developed, but are there, Fort feels, as a sort of throwback to primeval times.

Fort discusses many topics he had touched on before, though generally in more detail than in his other works – poltergeists, spontaneous human combustion, animal mutilations, vampires, and ghosts – along with many supposed cases of psychokinesis and ability to control one's surroundings. His thesis is that in primeval times, man needed such extraordinary powers in order to survive in the wilderness, and that all people can potentially develop these powers if they literally put their mind to it. He also explores alleged cases of witchcraft and murder by mental suggestion, compiling an impressive list of "occult criminology" (people apparently being murdered under peculiar or unexplainable circumstances) in support. He also attacks the general sense of taboo which he feels prevents wild talents from being accepted, and suggests that such "talents" would become acceptable if science would deem them as such.

Fort also plays around with the idea that humans are able to transform into animals at will, citing a number of cases of werewolves and other similar creatures such as gorillas and hyenas. He also casually (and quite humorously) dismisses, in one chapter, reports of a talking dog that "disappeared in a thin, greenish vapor", because, in his view, it is an extraordinary event, and he only deals with quite ordinary ones.

Fort also briefly mentions a purported psychic occurrence that happened to him and his family where he imagined a picture frame in his house falling from the wall and it then happened. He regards this with his usual tongue-in-cheek manner, and it is doubtful (as usual) that he seriously believes what he is saying.

== Availability ==
Wild Talents was republished in the 1990s. This book is available as part of Dover Publications' collection of The Complete Works of Charles Fort.
