= New Lands =

1923 book by Charles Fort

First edition (publ. Boni & Liveright)

New Lands is the second nonfiction book of the author Charles Fort, published in 1923. It deals primarily with astronomical anomalies and has been described as "largely a satirical attack upon the pomposity of astronomers".

== Overview ==
In the first part of the book, Fort criticises astronomy, listing predictions astronomers made that never came true. He also continues his attacks on scientific dogma, begun in his previous book The Book of the Damned, citing a number of mysterious stars and planets that scientists failed to account for.

Fort expands in this book on his theory about the Super-Sargasso Sea – a place where earthly things supposedly materialize in order to rain down on Earth – as well as developing an idea that there are continents above the skies of Earth. As evidence, in the second part of the book, he cites a number of anomalous phenomena, including strange "mirages" of land masses, groups of people, and animals in the skies.

Of all of Fort's books, New Lands is the worst-regarded. His speculations (serious or joking, he does not reveal) concerning continents in the sky and the supposed top-like shape of the Earth have dated considerably. It has been suggested that Fort's arrangement of the book - particularly his criticism of astronomers and long-established concepts in its opening chapters - risked it being seen as a piece of "crank literature".

== Publication ==
New Lands was published by Boni & Liveright in 1923. It had poor sales - which led to Boni & Liveright turning down Fort's next book for publication.

== Availability ==
New Lands is available in Dover Publications' The Complete Works of Charles Fort with Fort's other paranormal writings. A paperback version was published in the 1990s. An edited online version is also available.
