= Diddington =

Village in Cambridgeshire, England

Coordinates: 52.27°N 0.25°W

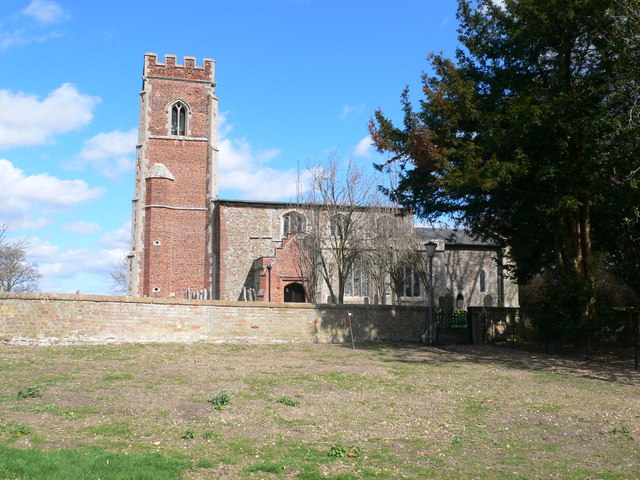
- St Lawrence's Church, Diddington

- Location within Cambridgeshire
- Population: 139 (2011)
- OS grid reference: TL194646
- District: Huntingdonshire
- Shire county: Cambridgeshire
- Region: East
- Country: England
- Sovereign state: United Kingdom
- Post town: St Neots
- Postcode district: PE19
- Dialling code: 01480
- Police: Cambridgeshire
- Fire: Cambridgeshire
- Ambulance: East of England
- UK Parliament: Huntingdon

Diddington is a small village and civil parish in Cambridgeshire, England. Diddington lies approximately 5 miles (8 km) south-west of Huntingdon, near Buckden. Diddington is situated within Huntingdonshire which is a non-metropolitan district of Cambridgeshire as well as being a historic county of England. Its population at the time of the 2011 census was 139.

== History ==
In 1085 William the Conqueror ordered that a survey should be carried out across his kingdom to discover who owned which parts and what it was worth. The survey took place in 1086 and the results were recorded in what, since the 12th century, has become known as the Domesday Book. Starting with the king himself, for each landholder within a county there is a list of their estates or manors; and, for each manor, there is a summary of the resources of the manor, the amount of annual rent that was collected by the lord of the manor both in 1066 and in 1086, together with the taxable value.

Diddington was listed in the Domesday Book in the Hundred of Toseland in Huntingdonshire; the name of the settlement was written as Dodinctun and Dodintone in the Domesday Book. In 1086 there were two manors at Diddington; the annual rent paid to the lords of the manors in 1066 had been £5 and the rent had increased to £6.5 in 1086.

The Domesday Book does not explicitly detail the population of a place but it records that there was 14 households at Diddington. There is no consensus about the average size of a household at that time; estimates range from 3.5 to 5.0 people per household. Using these figures then an estimate of the population of Diddington in 1086 is that it was within the range of 49 and 70 people.

The Domesday Book uses a number of units of measure for areas of land that are now unfamiliar terms, such as hides and ploughlands. In different parts of the country, these were terms for the area of land that a team of eight oxen could plough in a single season and are equivalent to 120 acres (49 hectares); this was the amount of land that was considered to be sufficient to support a single family. By 1086, the hide had become a unit of tax assessment rather than an actual land area; a hide was the amount of land that could be assessed as £1 for tax purposes. The survey records that there were six ploughlands at Diddington in 1086. In addition to the arable land, there was 40 acres (16 hectares) of meadows and 1,146 acres (464 hectares) of woodland at Diddington.

The tax assessment in the Domesday Book was known as geld or danegeld and was a type of land-tax based on the hide or ploughland. It was originally a way of collecting a tribute to pay off the Danes when they attacked England, and was only levied when necessary. Following the Norman Conquest, the geld was used to raise money for the King and to pay for continental wars; by 1130, the geld was being collected annually. Having determined the value of a manor's land and other assets, a tax of so many shillings and pence per pound of value would be levied on the land holder. While this was typically two shillings in the pound the amount did vary; for example, in 1084 it was as high as six shillings in the pound. For the manors at Diddington the total tax assessed was 5.5 geld.

By 1086 there was already a church at Diddington. The parish consists of 1,292 acres running to the west of the River Great Ouse.

During the Second World War the hall and its park were requisitioned by the government. Between 1939 and 1942 it housed prisoners of war and was used as a transit camp. From December 1942 until August 1943 it was taken over by the 2nd American Hospital, with 4265 casualties treated in the space of only seven months. It then became home to the 49th American Station Hospital, the second largest American hospital in England. Vacated at the end of the war, in 1946 it became a Polish Resettlement Camp. As well as housing Polish military personnel for convalescence, it also served as a maternity unit for Polish women from many areas, and 1073 babies were born there between 1946 and 1948.

In 1948 the Frédéric Chopin Secondary School, a boarding school for Polish children, was established on the site of the hall, and when the Polish Grammar School at Bottisham closed in the 1950s, its pupils were relocated to Diddington. It closed in 1954, with the remaining pupils primarily relocated to Lilford Hall School. The manor house itself has since been demolished.

The village was struck by an F1/T2 tornado on 23 November 1981, as part of the record-breaking nationwide tornado outbreak on that day.

Known as Dodinctun at the time of the Domesday Book in 1086 and Dydyngton by the 14th century, the name Diddington means "estate associated with a man named Dodda".

== Government ==
The parish clerk and the chairman of the parish meeting stood down with effect from 31 December 2014; a parish grouping arrangement was agreed in principle with neighbouring Buckden parish council and was ratified by Huntingdonshire District Council in March 2014.

Diddington was in the historic and administrative county of Huntingdonshire until 1965. From 1965, the village was part of the new administrative county of Huntingdon and Peterborough. Then in 1974, following the Local Government Act 1972, Diddington became a part of the county of Cambridgeshire.

The second tier of local government is Huntingdonshire District Council which is a non-metropolitan district of Cambridgeshire and has its headquarters in Huntingdon. Huntingdonshire District Council has 52 councillors representing 29 district wards. Huntingdonshire District Council collects the council tax, and provides services such as building regulations, local planning, environmental health, leisure and tourism. Diddington is a part of the district ward of Buckden and is represented on the district council by one councillor. District councillors serve for four-year terms following elections to Huntingdonshire District Council.

For Diddington the highest tier of local government is Cambridgeshire County Council which has administration buildings in Cambridge. The county council provides county-wide services such as major road infrastructure, fire and rescue, education, social services, libraries and heritage services. Cambridgeshire County Council consists of 69 councillors representing 60 electoral divisions. Diddington is part of the electoral division of Buckden, Gransden and The Offords and is represented on the county council by one councillor.

At Westminster Diddington is in the parliamentary constituency of Huntingdon, and elects one Member of Parliament (MP) by the first past the post system of election. Diddington is represented in the House of Commons by Jonathan Djanogly (Conservative). Jonathan Djanogly has represented the constituency since 2001. The previous member of parliament was John Major (Conservative) who represented the constituency between 1983 and 2001.

== Demography ==
=== Population ===
In the period 1801 to 1901 the population of Diddington was recorded every ten years by the UK census. During this time the population was in the range of 156 (the lowest was in 1801) and 216 (the highest was in 1851).

From 1901, a census was taken every ten years with the exception of 1941 (due to the Second World War).

Parish	1911	1921	1931	1951	1961	1971	1981	1991	2001	2011
Diddington	186	175	172	668	119	93	96	96	86	139

All population census figures from report Historic Census figures Cambridgeshire to 2011 by Cambridgeshire Insight.

In 2011, the parish covered an area of 1,300 acres (526 hectares)

== Culture and community ==
The village lies along a single street that can only be accessed from the Great North Road. In 1892 Arthur John Thornhill, lord of the manor, commissioned a village hall which is still in use today. Thornhill also built the School House which was completed in 1899. The population of the parish varied between 150 and 220 between 1801 and the Second World War. The presence of Diddington School caused the population to jump to 668 by 1951 before dropping sharply again to 119 in 1961.

== Religious sites ==
The parish church of St Lawrence consists of a chancel with modern north vestry, nave, north aisle, south chapel, west tower, and south porch. There was a church on the site by 1086, but the present church dates from the 13th century when the chancel and nave were completed. The tower was added in the 16th century. The original 13th-century font is still present.
