= Henry Bathurst (bishop) =

English churchman (1744–1837)

The Right Reverend Henry Bathurst
- Bishop of Norwich
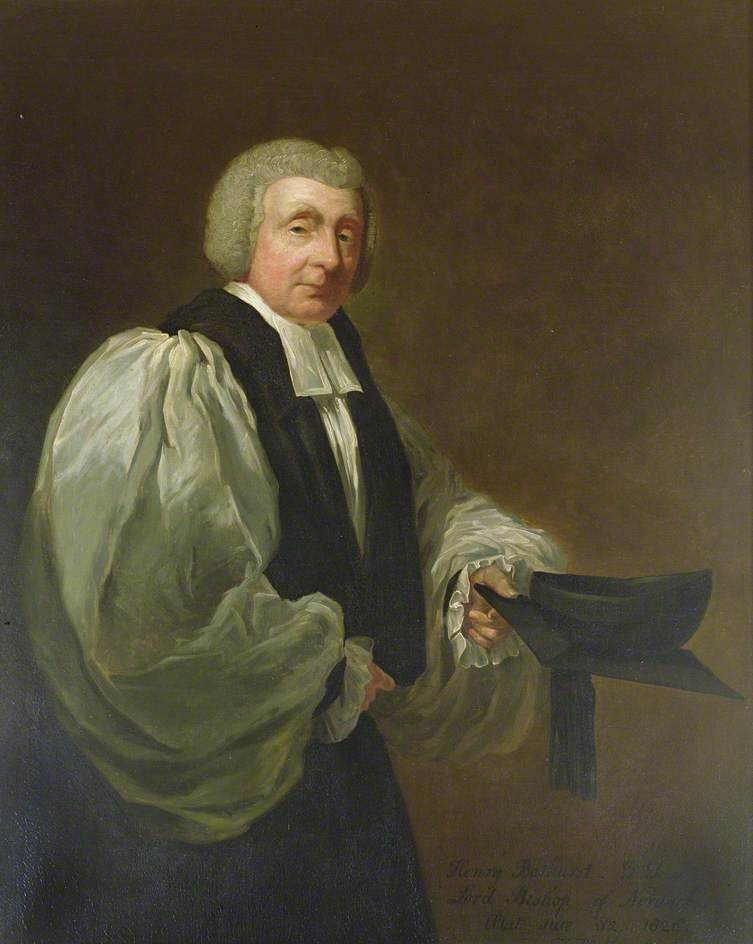
- Portrait by Thomas Kirkby
- Diocese: Diocese of Norwich
- In office: 1805–1837
- Predecessor: Charles Manners-Sutton
- Successor: Edward Stanley

Personal details
- Born: 16 October 1744
- Died: 5 April 1837 (aged 92) London
- Buried: Great Malvern Priory
- Denomination: Anglican
- Spouse: Grace Coote
- Education: Winchester College; New College, Oxford

Henry Bathurst (October 1744 – 5 April 1837) was an English churchman, a prominent Whig and bishop of Norwich.

== Life ==
Bathurst was one of 36 children of Benjamin Bathurst (younger brother of Allen Bathurst, 1st Earl Bathurst). He was either born on 16 October 1744 at Brackley, Northamptonshire or born in Westminster and baptised on 15 October 1744. He was educated at Winchester College, and New College, Oxford. He was made deacon in Advent 1767 (20 December) and ordained priest in Advent 1769 (24 December) — both times by Robert Lowth, Bishop of Oxford, at Christ Church Cathedral, Oxford. He became rector of Witchingham in Norfolk; in 1775 was made canon of Christ Church, Oxford; and in 1795 prebendary of Durham Cathedral.

In 1805, on the translation of Charles Manners-Sutton to Canterbury, he was appointed Bishop of Norwich. He legally took the See by the confirmation of his election on 1 April 1805; and he was consecrated a bishop on 28 April by Manners-Sutton as Archbishop of Canterbury. Bathurst died in London, on 5 April 1837, and was buried at Great Malvern. For many years he was considered to be the only "liberal" bishop in the House of Lords, and he supported Catholic emancipation. Bathurst was privately critical of the blood expended by the British in fighting Napoleon and in 1815 he and his son (just appointed his archdeacon at Norwich) attacked the restoration of the Bourbon dynasty in France. Like his Norfolk friend Thomas W Coke ("Coke of Holkham") he admired Napoleon as an enlightened ruler and regretted his exile. In 1835, when over ninety years of age, he went to the house to vote in support of Lord Melbourne's government.

Although frequently considered to have been a rather ineffectual diocesan and to have had a lax ordination standard, ordaining men rejected by other bishops, recent work has suggested that he had firm opinions on what made a man fit for ordination and preferred to deal with applications on a case-by-case basis, instead of applying blanket admission criteria which sometimes excluded deserving and promising candidates.

== Family ==
The bishop married Grace, a daughter of Charles Coote, dean of Kilfenora, and brother of Sir Eyre Coote. The union produced eight sons and three daughters. His eldest son, Henry Bathurst, was a fellow of New College, Oxford; became chancellor of the church of Norwich in 1805; held the rectories of Oby (1806), North Creake (1809), and Hollesley (1828); and was appointed archdeacon of Norwich in 1814. He wrote Memoirs of the late Dr. Henry Bathurst, Lord Bishop of Norwich, in 1837; he issued in 1842 a supplement, with additional letters of his father, titled An Easter Offering for the Whigs... being a Supplement to the Memoirs of the late Bishop of Norwich,, in which he concentrated criticism on the injustice of the Whig party in refusing to promote his father to a richer see. Archdeacon Bathurst died on 10 September 1844.

His second son, Lt.-Gen. Sir James Bathurst, was a military commander. The bishop's third son, Benjamin Bathurst, went missing in 1809 in Germany, and is believed to have been murdered; his elder daughter, Tryphena Bathurst Thistlethwayte, rewrote her father's memoirs from her eldest brother's papers. His youngest daughter, Caroline de Crespigny, (1797–1861) was a poet and for many years a close confidante of Shelley's cousin and biographer Thomas Medwin.

Church of England titles
Preceded by Charles Manners-Sutton	Bishop of Norwich; 1805–1837	Succeeded by Edward Stanley
