= Carousel (comics) =

Carousel is a long-running multimedia comics slide show hosted by cartoonist Robert Sikoryak (Masterpiece Comics) that has been presented in various venues in the United States and Canada since 1997. Sikoryak has described Carousel as "a cartoon variety show." Carousel has been presented at Dixon Place, MoCCA Fest, Parsons School of Design, The Brick Theater, and other venues.

== History ==
The first Carousel slide shows were projected using a slide projector. The show was named after the Kodak Carousel slide projector.

In 2011, The Village Voice called Carousel a highlight of The Brick Theater's Comic Book Theater Festival.

Many cartoonists, artists and voice actors have participated, including:

- Scott Adsit
- Todd Alcott
- Jonathan Ames
- Kate Beaton
- Gabrielle Bell
- Gregory Benton
- Nick Bertozzi
- Rupert Bottenberg
- Megan Montague Cash
- Victor Cayro
- Howard Chackowicz
- Sean Chiki
- Domitille Collardey
- Adam Conover
- Ann Decker
- Julie Delporte
- Brian Dewan
- Aaron Diaz
- Eric Drysdale
- Chris Duffy
- Jess Fink
- Emily Flake
- Nick Gazin
- Pascal Girard
- James Godwin
- Myla Goldberg
- Dale Goodson
- Patrick Hambrecht
- Lisa Hanawalt
- Tom Hart
- Dean Haspiel
- Glenn Head
- Danny Hellman
- Sam Henderson
- Lizz Hickey
- Bill Kartalopoulos
- Ben Katchor
- Kaz
- Susan Kim
- Julie Klausner
- John Kovaleski
- Hawk Krall
- Tim Kreider
- Michael Kupperman
- Miss Lasko-Gross
- M. Sweeney Lawless
- Leah Yael Levy
- Jeffrey Lewis
- Jason Little
- Kevin Maher
- Billy Mavreas
- Dyna Moe
- Neil Numberman
- Tao Nyeu
- George O'Connor
- Joe Ollmann
- Roxanne Palmer
- K. A. Polzin
- Jackson Publick
- Hans Rickheit
- Jason Roeder
- Dave Roman
- Laurie Rosenwald
- Laurie Sandell
- David Sandlin
- Allison Silverman
- Doug Skinner
- Karen Sneider
- Ted Stearn
- Leslie Stein
- Raina Telgemeier
- Matthew Thurber
- Jim Torok
- Ted Travelstead
- James Urbaniak
- Colleen AF Venable
- Lauren R. Weinstein
- Julia Wertz
- Shannon Wheeler
- Kriota Willberg
- Daniel Wright
