= Claude Lalumière =

Canadian author, book reviewer and editor

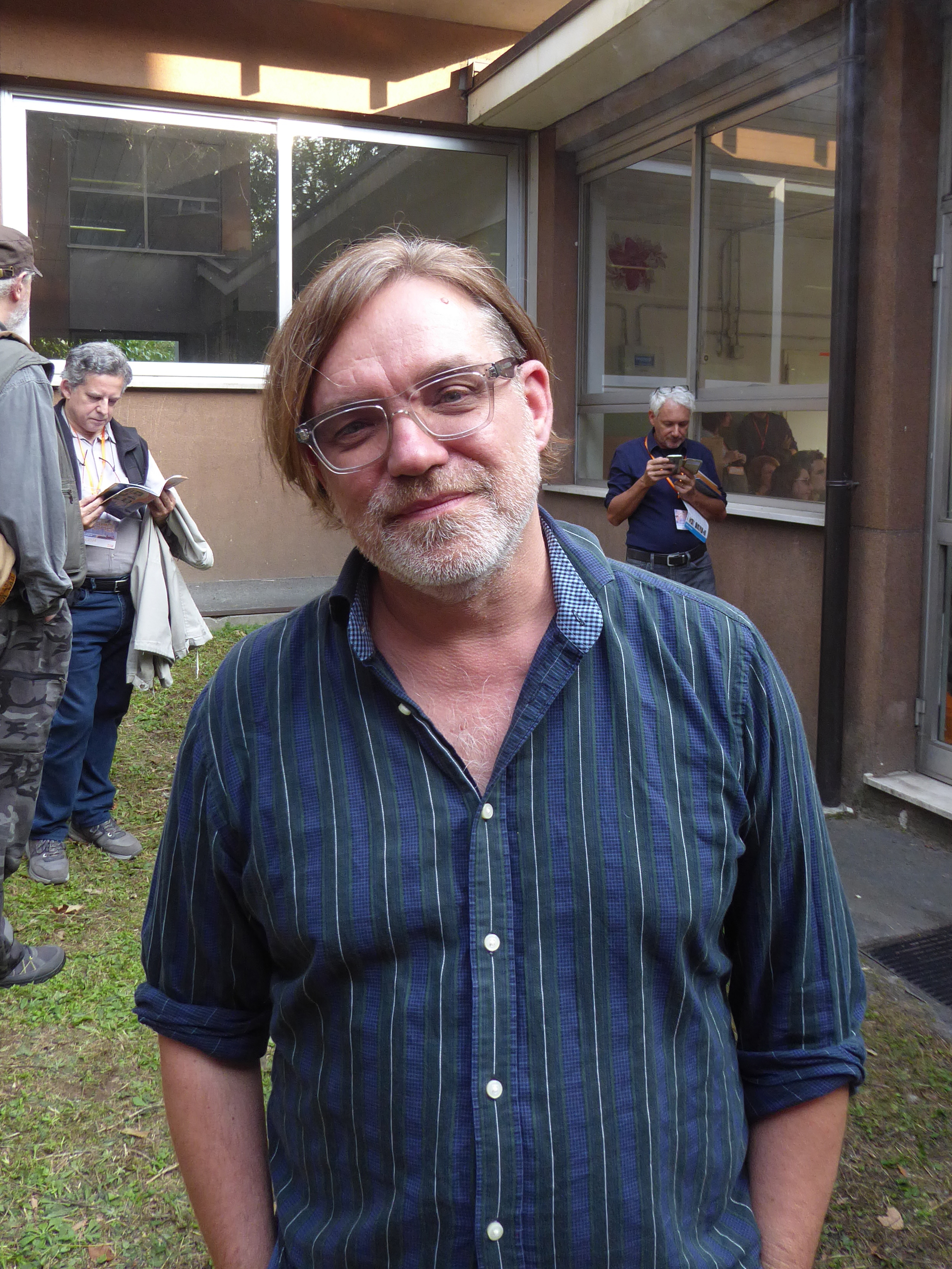
- Lalumière at Stranimondi in Milan in 2019
- Born: 1966 (age 58–59); Montreal, Quebec, Canada
- Occupation(s): writer, reviewer, editor

Claude Lalumière (born 1966) is an author, book reviewer and has edited numerous anthologies. A resident of Montreal, Quebec, he writes the Montreal Gazette's Fantastic Fiction column. He also owned and operated two independent book stores in Montreal. He and Rupert Bottenberg are co-creators of lostmyths.net.

Lalumière's own fiction consists mostly of short stories tending to dark fantasy. In a review of his first collection, Objects of Worship in Strange Horizons, Anil Menon characterised the title story and two others as generating "that wondering disquiet so hard to achieve with other literary genres" and noting that they were already being studied in writing courses.

== Bibliography ==
=== Collections ===
- Objects of Worship (2009) ChiZine Publications; ISBN 978-0-9812978-2-8
- The Door to Lost Pages (2011) ChiZine Publications; ISBN 1-926851-12-9
- Nocturnes and Other Nocturnes (2014) Infinity Plus Books

=== Anthologies ===
- Telling Stories: New English Stories from Quebec (2002) Véhicule Press; ISBN 1-55065-161-7
- Open Space: New Canadian Fantastic Fiction (2003) Red Deer Press; ISBN 0-88995-281-7
- Witpunk (2003) Running Press; ISBN 978-1-56858-256-6
- Island Dreams: Montreal Writers of the Fantastic (2004) Véhicule Press; ISBN 1-55065-171-4
- Short Stuff: New English Stories from Quebec (2005) Véhicule Press; ISBN 1-55065-202-8
- Lust for Life: Tales of Sex and Love (2006) Véhicule Press; ISBN 1-55065-203-6
- Tesseracts Twelve (2008) EDGE Science Fiction and Fantasy Publishing; ISBN 978-1-894063-15-9
- Super Stories of Heroes & Villains (Tachyon Publications, August 2013)
