= Doug Skinner =

American composer, writer, and performer (born 1955)

Doug Skinner (born January 7, 1955) is an American composer, writer, and performer.

== Music ==
Skinner has written music for many dance companies, including ODC/Dance in San Francisco and Margaret Jenkins. He has often written for the theater: in particular, he has had a long association with the actor/clown Bill Irwin; he wrote and performed the music for Irwin's Murdoch ('81), The Regard of Flight ('82), The Courtroom ('85), The Clown Lecture ('02), The Harlequin Studies ('03), and The Regard Evening ('04). He often performs his songs in NYC clubs. In the '90s, he frequently gigged with the ukulele and vocal trio White Knuckle Sandwich.

== Performance ==
As a performer, he has been active as actor, monologist, and occasional ventriloquist. His full shows include Pay Attention (1984), An Attractive Production (1985), and Eddie Unchained (1993). He regularly shows cartoon slide shows on Robert Sikoryak's long-running Carousel. He has also created many puppet shows and videos with performance/video artist Michael Smith.

According to the online magazine nth position, for which he occasionally writes, Doug Skinner has also played piano on the BBC, cello at the White House, and ukulele on the Joe Franklin Show. He also appeared as the character referred to as "Toilet Citizen" in the 1988 film Crocodile Dundee II.

== Writing ==
In recent years, Skinner has devoted more time to writing and lecturing, particularly on Fortean subjects. He has contributed to Fortean Times, Fate, The Anomalist, INFO Journal, Strange Attractor Journal, Weirdo, Nickelodeon, and other publications, writing on such subjects as Richard Shaver, John Keel, the early Fortean Society, John Dee, Boris Vian, the scientific method, the cultural history of Darwinism in the US, and hoaxes. Regular features have included the column Let's Ask Skinner for Crimewave USA and the comic strip It's Fortean for the kids' paper ZUZU. His translation of the alchemical text Three Dreams, by Giovanni Battista Nazari, was published in 2003 by Opus Magnum Hermetic Sourceworks in Glasgow.

He has also been a frequent speaker at the International Fortean Organization (INFO) Fortfests and the Fortean Times UnConventions.

=== Bibliography ===
- "Visions of a Subterranean Wonderworld", The Anomalist, 1995, about Richard Shaver's art
- "The Immortal Count", Fortean Times #146, 2001, about the Count of St Germain
- "What's This? A Shaver Revival?", Fate, June 2005, about Richard Shaver
- "Doubting Tiffany", Fortean Times #200, 2005, about the Fortean Society
- "The Blood Still Boils", Fate, July 2006, about Saint Januarius
- "A Fortean Album from the papers of Theodore Dreiser", Fortean Times #207, 2006, about recent finds of early photographs of Charles Fort
- Considerations on the Death and Burial of Tristan Tzara by Isidore Isou. Translated from the French by Doug Skinner. (Black Scat Books: Absurdist Texts & Document Series No. 8, 2012)
- How I Became an Idiot by Francisque Sarcey by Alphonse Allais. Translated from the French by Doug Skinner. (Black Scat Books: Absurdist Texts & Documents, Interim Edition: No. 00, 2013)
- Captain Cap (Vol. I): Captain Cap Before the Electorate by Alphonse Allais. Translated from the French by Doug Skinner. (Black Scat Books: Absurdist Texts & Document Series No. 11, 2013)
- Captain Cap (Vol. II): The Apparent Symbiosis Between the Boa and Giraffe by Alphonse Allais. Translated from the French by Doug Skinner. (Black Scat Books: Absurdist Texts & Document Series No. 14, 2013)
- Captain Cap (Vol. III): The Antifilter & Other Inventions by Alphonse Allais. Translated from the French by Doug Skinner. (Black Scat Books: Absurdist Texts & Document Series No. 17, 2013)
- Captain Cap (Vol. IV): The Sanatorium of the Future by Alphonse Allais. Translated from the French by Doug Skinner. (Black Scat Books: Absurdist Texts & Document Series No. 20, 2013)
- Captain Cap: His Adventures, His Ideas, His Drinks by Alphonse Allais. Translated from the French by Doug Skinner. (Black Scat Books, ISBN 978-0-615-84340-7, 2013)
- Selected Plays of Alphonse Allais by Alphonse Allais. Translated from the French by Doug Skinner. (Black Scat Books, ISBN 978-0-692-27508-5, 2014)
- The Unknown Adjective and Other Stories by Doug Skinner. (Black Scat Books, ISBN 978-0-615-90609-6, 2014)
- Horoscrapes by Doug Skinner. (Black Scat Books, 2014)
- The Zombie of Great Peru by Pierre-Corneille Blessebois. Translated from the French by Doug Skinner. (Black Scat Books, 2015) ISBN 978-0-692-40974-9
- The Doug Skinner Dossier by Doug Skinner. (Black Scat Books, 2015) ISBN 978-0-692-46050-4
- Sleepytime Cemetery: 40 Stories by Doug Skinner. (Black Scat Books, 2016) ISBN 978-0692633908
- I Am Sarcey by Alphonse Allais. Translated from the French by Doug Skinner. (Black Scat Books: 2017) ISBN 978-0997777161
- The Doug Skinner Songbook by Doug Skinner. (Black Scat Books: 2017) ISBN 978-0999262221
- Charles Cros: Collected Monologues by Charles Cros. Translated from the French by Doug Skinner. (Black Scat Books:2018) ISBN 978-1732350625
- The Alphonse Allais Reader by Alphonse Allais. Compiled & translated by Doug Skinner. (Black Scat Books: 2018) ISBN 978-1732350670
- 2 + 2 = 5 by Alphonse Allais. Translated by Doug Skinner. (Black Scat Books: 2021) ISBN 978-1735764672
- Upside-Down Stories by Charles Cros & Émile Goudeau. Translated from the French by Doug Skinner. (Black Scat Books: Absurdist Texts & Documents Series No. 35, 2019) ISBN 978-1732350687
- The Pope's Mustard-Maker by Alfred Jarry. Translated from the French by Doug Skinner. (Black Scat Books: Absurdist Texts & Documents Series No. 37, 2019) ISBN 978-1733165624
- Let's Not Hit Each Other by Alphonse Allais. Translated from the French by Doug Skinner. (Black Scat Books: 2023) ISBN 979-8986922423
