= CCZ =

CCZ may refer to:

- Congestion charge zone, part of the London congestion charge traffic-reducing plan
- Operation Cyber Condition Zebra, a US Navy network operations campaign
- Coca-Cola Zero, a diet soft drink
- Clarion–Clipperton zone, an environmental management area of the Pacific Ocean
