= Peg Entwistle =

British actress (1908–1932)

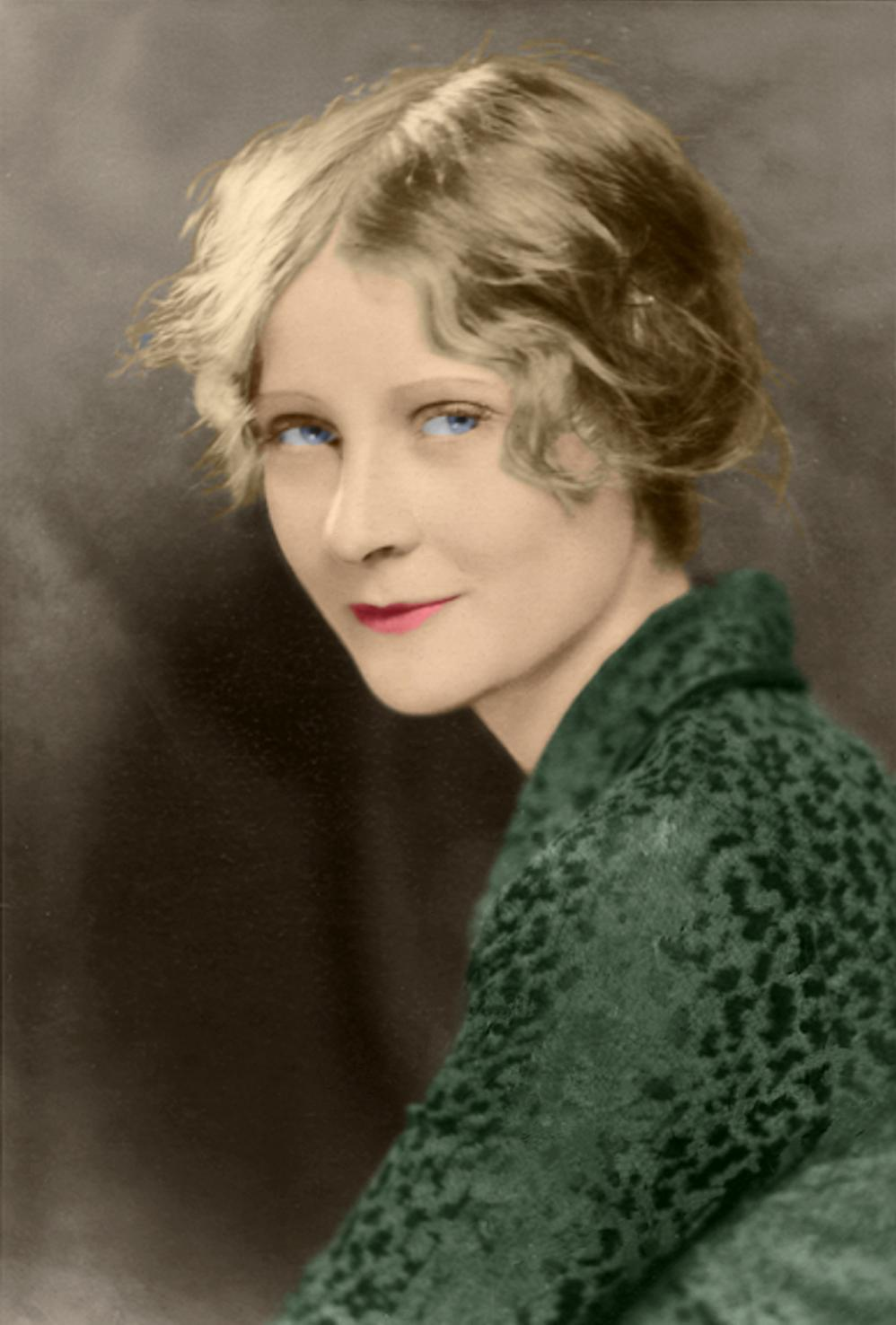
- Entwistle from Just to Remind You theatrical production (1929)
- Born: Millicent Lilian Entwistle; 5 February 1908; Port Talbot, Glamorgan, Wales
- Died: 16 September 1932 (aged 24) (Note: 16 September was surmised by police and is widely believed to be the date of her death. The body was found on 18 September.); Los Angeles, California, U.S.
- Cause of death: Suicide by jumping off the Hollywoodland Sign
- Resting place: Oak Hill Cemetery, Glendale, Ohio, U.S.
- Occupation: Actress
- Years active: 1925–1932
- Known for: Thirteen Women; The Wild Duck
- Spouse: Robert Keith (m. 1927; div. 1929)

Millicent Lilian "Peg" Entwistle (5 February 1908 – 16 September 1932) was a British stage and screen actress. She began her stage career in 1925, appearing in several Broadway productions. She appeared in only one film, Thirteen Women (1932), which was released posthumously. Entwistle gained notoriety after she jumped to her death from atop the 'H' on the Hollywoodland Sign in September 1932, at the age of 24.

== Early life ==
Born Millicent Lilian Entwistle in Port Talbot, Glamorgan, Wales, to English parents Emily Entwistle (née Stevenson) and Robert Symes Entwistle, an actor, she spent her early life in West Kensington, London.

It is often reported that her mother died when she was very young, but there is no documented evidence supporting this. There is, however, a Last Will and Testament dated 15 December 1922, in the Entwistle family archives, in which Robert Entwistle specifically stated the following:

Millicent Lilian Entwistle is the daughter of my first wife whom I divorced and the custody of my said daughter was awarded to me. I do not desire my said daughter to be at any time in the custody or control of her said mother.

Peg Entwistle reportedly migrated from Britain to America, sailing from Liverpool aboard the SS Philadelphia in 1916, and settled in New York City. However, documents and photographs made available by the Entwistle family for a biography state that Entwistle and her father were in Cincinnati, Ohio, and New York City in early spring 1913. This information is also corroborated by the Internet Broadway Database, and The New York Times, where Robert S. Entwistle is listed in the cast of several plays in 1913.

In December 1922, Robert Entwistle died, the victim of a hit-and-run motorist on Park Avenue and 72nd Street in New York City. Peg and her two younger half-brothers were taken in by their uncle, who had come with them to New York and was the manager of Broadway actor Walter Hampden.

== Broadway ==
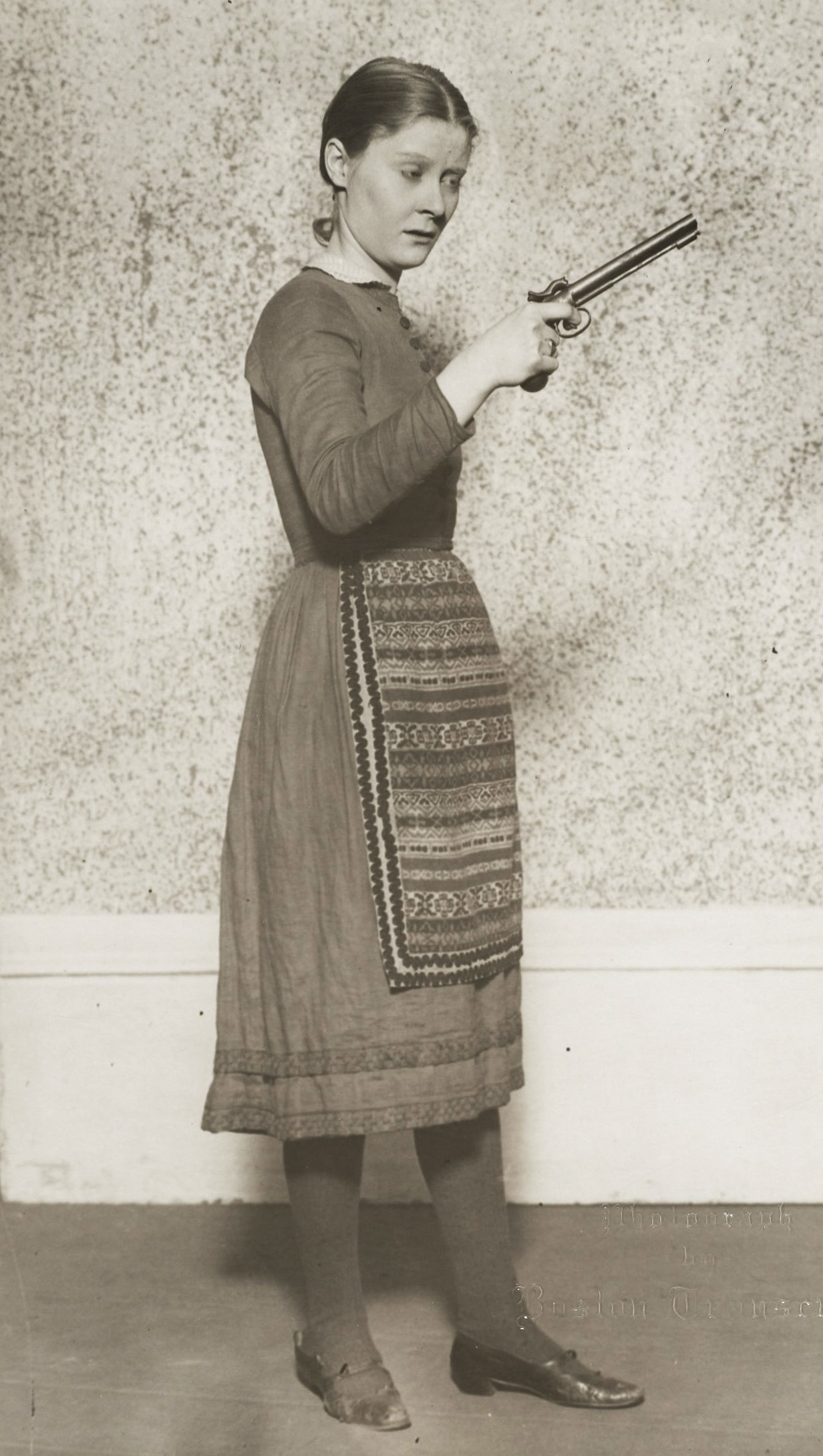
Entwistle in The Wild Duck (1925)

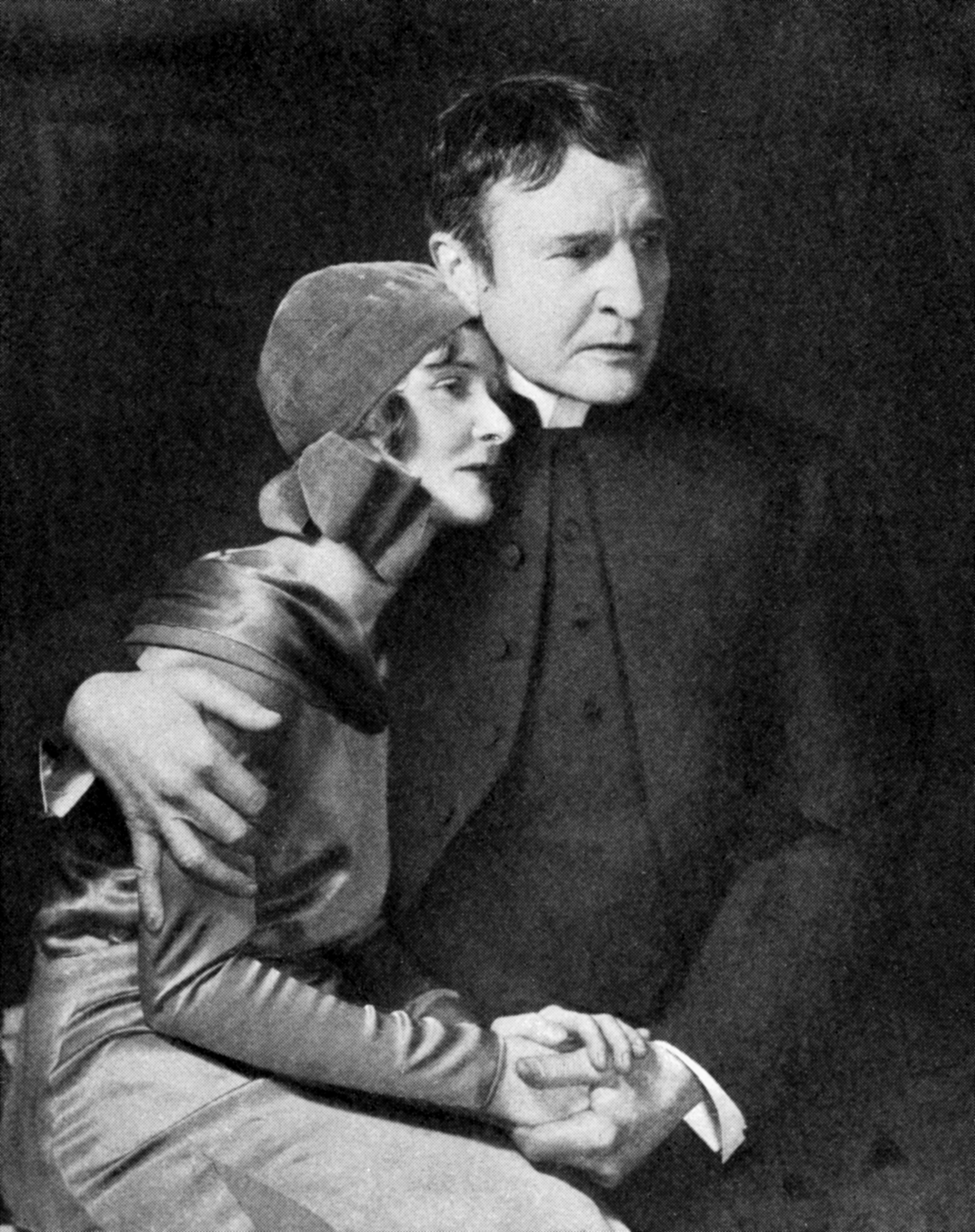
Entwistle and William Gillette in his farewell appearance as Sherlock Holmes, the 1929 Broadway production

By 1925, Entwistle was living in Boston as a student of Henry Jewett's Repertory (now called the Huntington Theatre) and was one of the Henry Jewett Players, who were gaining national attention. Walter Hampden gave Entwistle an uncredited walk-on part in his Broadway production of Hamlet, which starred Ethel Barrymore. She carried the King's train and brought in the poison-cup. At age 17, Entwistle played the role of Hedvig in a 1925 production of Henrik Ibsen's The Wild Duck. After seeing the play, Bette Davis told her mother, "I want to be exactly like Peg Entwistle." Some years later, Broadway actress and director Blanche Yurka sent a note to Davis asking if she would like to play Hedvig, and Davis sent word back that ever since she had seen Entwistle in The Wild Duck, she had known she would someday play Hedvig. Through the years, Davis said Entwistle was her inspiration to take up acting.

By 1926, Entwistle had been recruited by the New York Theatre Guild, and her first credited Broadway performance was in June of that year as Martha in The Man from Toronto, which opened at the Selywn Theatre and ran for 28 performances. Entwistle performed in ten Broadway plays as a member of the Theatre Guild between 1926 and 1932, working with noted actors such as George M. Cohan, William Gillette, Robert Cummings, Dorothy Gish, Hugh Sinclair, Henry Travers and Laurette Taylor. Her longest-running play was the 1927 hit Tommy, in which she starred with Sidney Toler, which ran for 232 performances and became the play for which she was most remembered.

The play The Uninvited Guest, closed after only seven performances in September 1927; however, New York Times critic J. Brooks Atkinson wrote, "Peg Entwistle gave a performance considerably better than the play warranted."

She went on tour with the Theatre Guild between Broadway productions. Changing characters every week, Entwistle garnered some publicity, such as an article in the Sunday edition of The New York Times in 1927 and another in the Oakland Tribune two years later.

Aside from a part in the suspense drama Sherlock Holmes and the Strange Case of Miss Faulkner and her desire to play more challenging roles, Entwistle was often cast as a comedian, most often the attractive, good-hearted ingénue. In 1929, she told a reporter:

I would rather play roles that carry conviction. Maybe it is because they are the easiest and yet the hardest things for me to do. To play any kind of an emotional scene I must work up to a certain pitch. If I reach this in my first word, the rest of the words and lines take care of themselves. But if I fail, I have to build up the balance of the speeches, and in doing this the whole characterisation falls flat. I feel that I am cheating myself. I don't know whether other actresses get this same reaction or not, but it does worry me.

In early 1932, Entwistle made her last Broadway appearance, in J. M. Barrie's Alice Sit-by-the-Fire, which also starred Laurette Taylor, whose alcoholism led her to two missed evening performances and refunds to ticket-holders. The show was cancelled, and in the aftermath, Entwistle and the other players were given only a week's salary, rather than a percentage of the box office gross, which had been agreed upon before the show opened.

== Hollywood ==
By May 1932, at the depth of the Great Depression, Entwistle was in Los Angeles with a role in the Romney Brent play The Mad Hopes, starring Billie Burke, which ran from 23 May to 4 June at the Belasco Theatre in downtown Los Angeles. Florence "Flo" Lawrence, theatre critic for the Los Angeles Examiner, gave the production a very favorable review:

Belasco and Curran have staged the new play most effectively and have endowed this Romney Brent opus with every distinction of cast and direction. (producer) Bela Blau ... has developed the comedy to its highest points. Costumes and settings are of delightful quality, and every detail makes the production one entirely fit for its translation to the New York stage. In the cast Peg Entwistle and Humphrey Bogart hold first place in supporting the star (Billie Burke) and both give fine, serious performances. Miss Entwistle as the earnest, young daughter (Geneva Hope) of a vague mother and presents a charming picture of youth...

After The Mad Hopes closed, Entwistle won her first and only credited film role with Radio Pictures (later RKO). Thirteen Women stars Myrna Loy and Irene Dunne in a pre-Hays code, high-budget thriller produced by David O. Selznick and drawn from the novel by Tiffany Thayer. Entwistle played a small supporting role as Hazel Cousins. It premiered on 14 October 1932, a month after her death, at the Roxy Theatre in New York City, and was released in Los Angeles on 11 November to neither critical nor commercial success. By the time it was re-released in 1935, 14 minutes had been cut from the film's original 73-minute running length. In 2008, Variety magazine cited Thirteen Women as one of the earliest "female ensemble" films.

== Personal life ==
In April 1927, Entwistle married the American actor Robert Keith at the chapel of the New York City Clerk's office. She was granted a divorce in May 1929. Along with charges of cruelty, she claimed her husband did not tell her he had been married before and was father to a six-year-old boy, Brian Keith, who later became an actor.

== Death ==
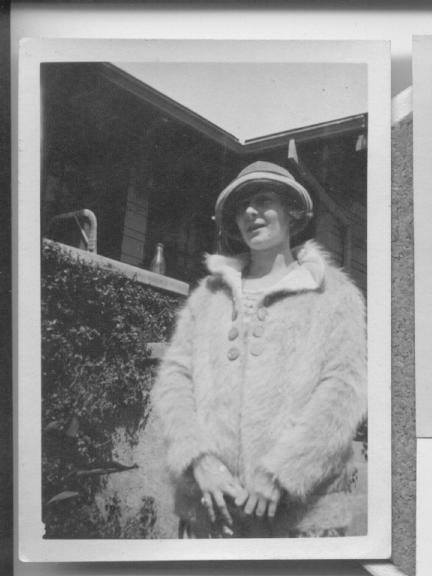
Peg Entwistle at her Hollywood home several days before her death

On 18 September 1932, a woman was hiking below the Hollywoodland Sign, when she found a woman's shoe, purse, and jacket. She opened the purse and found a suicide note, after which she looked down the mountain and saw the body below. The woman reported her findings to the Los Angeles police and laid the items on the steps of the Hollywood police station.

Later, a detective and two radio car officers found the body in a ravine below the sign. Entwistle remained unidentified until her uncle, with whom she had been living in the Beachwood Canyon area, identified her remains. He connected her two-day absence with the description and the initials "P.E.," written on the suicide note, which had been published in the newspapers. He said that on Friday, 16 September, she had told him she was going for a walk to a drugstore and to see some friends. The police surmised that instead she made her way to the nearby southern slope of Mount Lee to the foot of the Hollywoodland Sign, climbed a workman's ladder to the top of the "H" and jumped.

The cause of death was listed by the coroner as "multiple fractures of the pelvis."

The suicide note, as published, read:

I am afraid, I am a coward. I am sorry for everything. If I had done this a long time ago, it would have saved a lot of pain. P.E.

Entwistle's death brought wide and often sensationalized publicity. Her funeral was held at the W.M. Strathers Mortuary, in Hollywood, on 20 September. Her body was cremated and the ashes were later sent to Glendale, Ohio, for burial next to her father in Oak Hill Cemetery, where they were interred on 5 January 1933.

In 2014, roughly 100 people marked the anniversary of Entwistle's death by gathering in the parking lot of Beachwood Market in Hollywood, to watch Thirteen Women on an outdoor screen. Proceeds from a raffle and from food and beverages sold at the screening were donated to the American Foundation for Suicide Prevention in Entwistle's name.

== In popular culture ==
Charcoal drawing of Entwistle by New York fashion artist Alvaro

Dory Previn sang about Entwistle in the song "Mary C. Brown and the Hollywood Sign," on her 1972 album of the same name.

Jakko Jakszyk's song "Damn This Town" (from his 1995 album Mustard Gas and Roses) mentions Entwistle and her suicide.

The 1997 film Stand-ins begins with the suicide of Entwistle, played by Katherine Morris, and ends with reference to the news article about her death.

In 2014, Crazyhouse Theatre Productions created and staged the musical Goodnight September, loosely based on Entwistle's life and its impact on one family 70 years later, at the Granville Theatre in Ramsgate, England.

In 2015, French songwriter and musician Benoit Clerc composed and released "Peg est Mon Nom" ("Peg is My Name"), a ballad sung by Camille Saillant. The song imagines Peg Entwistle standing atop "The big white letter H" as she wonders whether she will be remembered after her death.

Entwistle was portrayed by actress Laura Liguori in the 2017 short film Hollywood Girl: The Peg Entwistle Story.

The song "Lust for Life" by Lana Del Rey references the suicide of Entwistle. The song includes lyrics such as "climb up the H of the Hollywood Sign," and in the music video for the song, Del Rey and The Weeknd are seen dancing atop the "H" of the Hollywood Sign.

Ryan Murphy's 2020 miniseries Hollywood revolves around the fictional production of a film, Peg, about Entwistle's acting career and suicide.

The song "Gardenias" by Protest the Hero references the suicide of Entwistle as a symbol for the struggle of "making it" in Hollywood. The lyrics heavily feature alliteration on the letter "H" and contain several references to Entwistle's death, including the height of the Hollywood Sign and the discovery of her remains by a hiker. The song appears on the album Palimpsest, released in 2020.

In 2021, a new mural depicting Entwistle appeared in the star's hometown of Port Talbot.

== Filmography ==
Year	Title	Role	Notes
1932	Thirteen Women	Hazel Clay Cousins	Posthumous release
