= Isaac Newton Vail =

American quaker, teacher and pseudoscientist

Isaac Newton Vail, from his 1912 book The Earth's Annular System

Isaac Newton Vail (1840 – January 26, 1912) was an American Quaker, schoolteacher, and pseudoscientist supporting the theory of catastrophism. His ideas were taken up by creationists including Jehovah's Witnesses.

== Life ==
Isaac Newton Vail was born to John Vail and Abigail (nee Edgerton) in Barnesville, Ohio in 1840. He was trained and then taught at the Quaker Seminary in Westtown Township, Pennsylvania, leaving to pursue his independent study of flood geology. He married Rachel D. Wilson in the fall of 1864; they had two daughters (Alice and Lydia). In 1876 Rachel died, and on 26 July 1880 Vail married his second wife Mary M. Cope in Salem, Ohio. The 1900 census records his occupation as a farmer.

Vail argued that the Earth once had rings like Saturn's, in what became known as the "Vailan theory" or "annular theory". His 1886 "Canopy Theory" proposed that the Earth had been ringed by a toroidal mass of ice, which he named the "firmament", following the usage in Genesis 1:6-8. Vail supposed that this could explain Noah's Flood, as he described in his 1874 book The Earth's Aqueous Ring: or The Deluge and its Cause.

Vail died on 26 January 1912 in Pasadena, California.

== Reception ==
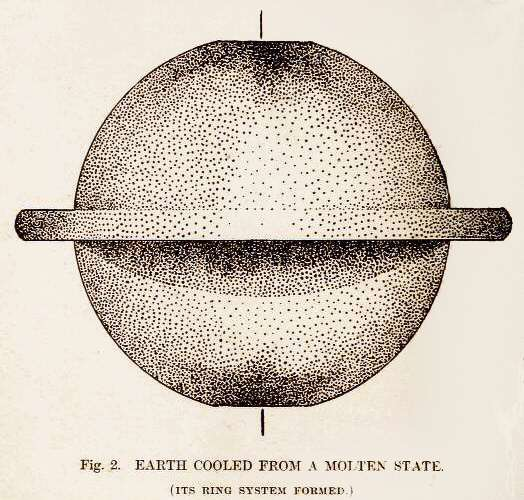
Isaac Newton Vail's diagram 'Earth Cooled From a Molten State' showing his supposed water ring system. In his theory, the rings collapsed to form Noah's flood.

The geologist Donald U. Wise writes that most creationist theories of Noah's Flood derive from Vail. Wise writes that Vail's "Canopy Theory" model consisted of "a series of Saturn-like aqueous rings, the progressive collapse of which caused successive cataclysms to bury and create fossils. Collapse of the last remnant ring caused the Noachian flood." Tom McIver similarly notes in Skeptic that the "Water Canopy Theory has long been a mainstay of creationists", who invoke it to account for both the conditions before the Genesis flood and the cause of the flood itself.

The historian of science Ronald Numbers, in his book on creationism, writes that the founders of the Jehovah's Witnesses "borrowed their geology" from Vail, as it was even referenced in their 1912 multi-media production The Photo Drama of Creation. In recent decades, the Witnesses have distanced themselves from some creationist teachings on the basis that such are not in harmony with Scripture nor scientific truths. However, Jehovah's Witnesses have continued to make reference to a water vapor canopy which they say is described in Genesis at the time of creation, and which was involved in the Genesis flood.

The Encyclopedia of Pseudoscience notes that, a century later, "members of the Fortean Society" support Vail's theory. The mathematician and science writer Martin Gardner in his book Fads and Fallacies in the Name of Science wrote that Vail's theories were still being popularized in the 20th century by the Annular World Association of Azusa, California.
