= Michael Smith (performance artist) =

American artist (born 1951)

- Born: March 8, 1951 (age 75); Chicago, Illinois, U.S.
- Education: Colorado College, Whitney Museum of American Art Independent Study Program
- Known for: Video, installation art, performance, drawing, art
- Awards: Guggenheim Fellowship, Alpert Awards in the Arts, National Endowment for the Arts (NEA)
- Website: https://michaelsmithartist.com http://www.mikes-world.org

Michael Smith, Imagine the View from Here!, Installation view, Museo Jumex, Mexico City, 2018.

Michael Smith (born March 8, 1951) is an American artist known for his performance, video and installation works. He emerged in the mid-1970s at a time when performance and narrative-based art was beginning to claim space in contemporary art. Included among the Pictures Generation artists, he also appropriated pop culture, using television conventions rather than tropes from static media. Since 1979, much of Smith's work has centered on an Everyman character, "Mike," that he has portrayed in various domestic, entrepreneurial and artistic endeavors. Writers have described his videos and immersive installations as "poker-faced parodies" that sit on the edge between art and entertainment, examining ideas, cultural shifts and absurdities involving the American dream, consumerism, the art world, and aging. Village Voice critic Jerry Saltz called Smith "a consummate explorer of the land of the loser … limning a fine line between reality and satire [in] a genre sometimes called installation verité."

Smith's early performances took place at avant-garde venues like The Kitchen, Franklin Furnace and Artists Space and downtown clubs such as CBGB and Mudd Club. He eventually performed in other, more mainstream clubs and institutions, such as The Bottom Line, Carolines, the Whitney Museum and Museum of Modern Art, and produced videos for Saturday Night Live and PBS and a comedy special for Cinemax. In later years, he has exhibited at the Metropolitan Museum of Art, New Museum, Museum of Contemporary Art, Los Angeles and Tate Modern, among others. In 2007–8, a retrospective, "Mike's World," was presented at the Blanton Museum of Art and the Institute of Contemporary Art, Philadelphia. Smith has received awards from the National Endowment for the Arts and Louis Comfort Tiffany Foundation in addition to a 1985 Guggenheim Fellowship and an Alpert Award in Visual Arts in 2012.

== Early life and career ==
Smith was born in 1951 and raised in a middle-class Jewish family on the south side of Chicago. In 1968, he enrolled at Colorado College, where he earned a BA in painting (1973), focusing on abstraction; his older brother Howard, also an abstract painter, was a mentor during this time. He was accepted into the Whitney Museum of American Art Independent Study Program in New York City in 1970 and returned again in 1973.

After college, Smith returned to Chicago to work with his father at his real estate company. During this time, he felt that he had reached a dead-end with painting and his interests gravitated toward avant-garde performance work by artists such as Vito Acconci, Richard Foreman and William Wegman He started going to a weekly open mic in the city and in response developed a performance, "Comedy Hour," which he first gave publicly in his own studio in 1975. In 1976, Whitney curator Marcia Tucker invited him to perform in a performance series at the museum, providing early validation for his new direction. Smith relocated to New York in the fall of 1976, joining an art scene that included Eric Fischl, Barbara Kruger, David Salle and performance artists Eric Bogosian and Stuart Sherman, in which he gained attention through performances at Artists Space, Franklin Furnace, The Kitchen and Castelli Graphics.

In addition to his art production, Smith has taught performance art at the University of Texas at Austin since 2001, as well as at several other schools.

== Work ==
Michael Smith, Government Approved Home Fallout Shelter Snack Bar, Installation view, Castelli Graphics, New York City, 1983.

Smith has produced performance works, commercial television and promotional business video simulations, adult puppet shows, immersive installations, drawings and photographs, often in collaboration with artists and directors such as Mike Kelley, Joshua White, Doug Skinner and Mark Fischer. His deadpan, pathos-laden style of humor draws on influences including 1960s comics Jackie Vernon and fellow Chicagoan Shelley Berman and Bob Newhart, actor-directors Buster Keaton and Jacques Tati, absurdist playwrights Samuel Beckett and Alfred Jarry, Voltaire's Candide, and comedy albums and TV shows from his youth.

Smith's work has often pushed the limits of entertainment, comedy and art with unconventional pacing, repetition, precise timing, subversive obtuseness, and a blurring of fiction and reality. He often lampoons the practices and promises of the entertainment industry, art world and American capitalism, exploring themes of fitting in, ambition, the obsolescence of "just past" motifs and tastes, failure and aging. Some writers contend that his work prefigured genres and works such as "mockumentaries", reality TV and The Truman Show, and adult-oriented "kid shows" (e.g., South Park); his art is sometimes compared to that of anarchic, hard-to-categorize creators like Andy Kaufman or Albert Brooks. Most of Smith's work has involved two characters: his everyman or "bland man" performance persona, "Mike," or an oversized infant called "Baby Ikki."

== "Mike" ==
Smith's "Mike" persona has been described as a bland, naïve, "perpetually hapless, perennially upbeat everyman" or "wise fool," who stubbornly pursues small-time entrepreneurial schemes and social goals with knotted brows and a "peculiar combination of puppyish enthusiasm and quiet desperation." His attempts to achieve the American Dream—through exhausted trends, dominant viewpoints and ad-copy tropes—are presented with a mix of gullibility, can-do Dale Carnegie-like optimism, pathos and culpability and in environments employing knowingly tacky design. New York Times critic Roberta Smith described Mike as "a latter-day Willie Loman, who makes everything in sight ricochet between post-modern irony and a genuine sense of sorrow for the many Mikes drifting across the American landscape."

Mike first appeared in performance works and then video collaborations between Smith and director Mark Fischer. In the video Down in the Rec Room (1979), Mike is presented endlessly waiting in signature boxer shorts for party guests that never arrive and interacting instead with cheesy media personalities heard on the audio track or viewed on a television. Secret Horror (1980) depicted a Muzak-scored nightmare in which Mike's apartment is besieged by a mysteriously dropping ceiling, a "party" attended only by tall ghosts, and 1960s pop-culture imperatives from TV game shows, sitcoms, music and commercial brands. Smith also performed as Mike in USA Free-Style Disco Championship (1979), competing at the twilight of the disco era in a real disco contest at New York's Copacabana nightclub and placing twelfth (last).

Art historian David Joselit called It Starts at Home (1982, first shown at the Whitney Museum in the installation Mike's House) "a watershed work" in video art that placed avant-garde practice within the debased rhetoric of the middlebrow TV sitcom and inverted the usual relationship between audience and spectacle. In its play on public access TV, Mike's mundane domestic life is being beamed to the world due to a cable installation snafu, making him inexplicably famous; among the work's other features were a purported agent (literally, a "deal-making piece of fur" named "Bob") and various disorienting sight gags, doublings and mismatches between the installation's home (also the cable-show set) and the video. In the satirical installation Government Approved Home Fallout Shelter/...Snack Bar (1983), Smith examined cold-war anxieties by transforming Mike's rec room into a fallout bunker (based on a 1950s FEMA manual), complete with a yellow concrete snack bar and a video game programmed to always lose.

Some of Smith's subsequent projects included the satirical music video Go For It, Mike (1984); the deadpan OYMA (Outstanding Young Men of America) (1996), which spoofed Reaganomics, the Horatio Alger myth and all-American stereotypes (e.g., the Marlboro Man, individualism); and 1990s adult-oriented puppet/performance collaborations with Doug Skinner, collectively titled Doug & Mike's Adult Entertainment. He also began to reflect on creative production and the business of the art world in the mock-instructional videos The World of Photography (1986, with William Wegman) and How to Curate Your Own Group Exhibition (Do It) (1996).

Michael Smith and Joshua White, MUS-CO, Installation view, Lauren Wittels, NYC, 1997.

=== Collaborations with Joshua White ===
Smith began to work with artist-director Joshua White in the 1990s. Their collaborative installation MUSCO (1997) presented Mike as the owner of a once successful lighting business, now in the throes of bankruptcy. It included a believable office (grimy fax machine, threadbare carpet, boxes and trash bags resulting from a "reorganization"), a showroom with aging wares and specially created misfires (“Mood Tube” table lamps, satin "Disco-Time" vests), and a promotional video. Artforum's Tom Moody called it an "exhaustively detailed, tragicomic installation … fusing the decline of '60s idealism and the downside of the American dream into a spectacle at once depressing and hilarious"; Dan Cameron declared it an "exhilarating and unbearably sad" journey from countercultural ethic to disco consumption to cutthroat 1990s business competition.

For Open House (1997/2007), they converted the New Museum's basement into the convincingly lived-in basement studio of Mike, then a mediocre conceptual artist whose only success was the timely purchase of the "loft" he is now selling. Complete with examples of Mike's derivative art, tapes of his public access art show ("Interstitial") and squalid details, the show was described by Artforum as "corrosively funny … Hans Haacke meets Jerry Seinfeld" and a peculiarly American version "of failure, of utopian dreams sold down the river of compromise and capitalism." The QuinQuag Arts and Wellness Centre (2001–2) depicted Mike awash in loft-sale and dot-com money and the inadvertent owner of a fictional, mid-century Catskills Utopian artists' colony ("QuinQuag") fallen on hard times. The pointed installation's dowdy exhibits, promotional videos, artifacts and folksy products (e.g., an artist-produced rocker Jackie Kennedy may have purchased for JFK) portray Mike's efforts to resurrect the colony under the auspices of a "Wellness Solutions Group" and corporate retreats.

Smith and White also collaborated on the carnivalesque "Mike's World" traveling retrospective exhibition (2007–8, Blanton Museum and ICA Philadelphia), which featured videos (including an "orientation" based on those at presidential libraries), performances, installations, publications and drawings.

=== Later work ===
Smith's later work often examines aging. Excuse me!?! ... I’m Looking for the 'Fountain of Youth' (Greene Naftali/Tate Modern, 2015) was a sprawling project of drawings, videos, performance, photographs and a woven tapestry. Its conceptual art-dance-performance piece distilled various late-life indignities—Mike's attempts at yoga, humiliating airport security searches, "encouraged" retirement, the feeling of invisibility—and included a surreal medieval dream sequence, in which an elixir reverts him from a knight into a court jester and then a baby, suggesting the futility of the titular search. Imagine the View from Here (Museo Jumex, 2018–9) critiqued the art world’s relationship to development and reflected on middle-class aging. Occupying the museum’s mezzanine, the exhibition presented tradeshow booths and promotional videos from Smith's long-running, fictional "International Trade and Enrichment Association" (ITEA) project offering art lovers (with Mike as surrogate) a faux, "Fully Curated Timeshare" in the museum as an investment and luxury destination. Reviews described the work's sales pitch combining "the gleefully, ignorant optimism of Mike" and an "essentially underwhelming marketing display" as deadpan and bitingly satirical.

Mike Kelley and Michael Smith, A Voyage of Growth and Discovery, Production still, 2009.

=== "Baby Ikki" ===
Smith's other recurring performance persona is "Baby Ikki," an oversized infant described as "pre-linguistic, genderless" and gorilla-like, with conspicuous facial hair, oversized diapers, a bonnet and undersized sunglasses. First created in 1975 in Chicago and performed by Smith with a tensed body and impulsive, precisely mimicked movements, the character was a crowd-pleaser that enabled direct audience interaction and elicited a combination of repulsion and concern; in the 1978 video Baby Ikki, he ventures out into traffic, only to be dragged back to the sidewalk, bawling, by a visibly unamused policeman.

Baby Ikki has appeared internationally in performances, videos and installations in New York (Electronic Arts Intermix, MoMA), Los Angeles and Europe. He was featured in a collaborative exhibition with Seth Price, "Playground" (2003, Galleria Emi Fontana, Milan), that included an installation of playground toys and video projections depicting him visiting various deserted meeting places. In 2009, Smith collaborated with artist Mike Kelley on a multimedia installation based on Baby Ikki’s adventures at Burning Man, A Voyage of Growth and Discovery (SculptureCenter, 2009; West of Rome, 2010). The project combined aspects of both artists' past work—dancing, dressing up, infantilism—with the festival's ethos of weeklong "radical self-expression." It included an eighteen-foot Baby Ikki junk sculpture and skeletal metal playground structures designed by Kelley and projected video of Ikki at the festival, playing tetherball, dancing, and interacting amid the mass of people.

== Awards and collections ==
Smith has received fellowships from the Guggenheim Foundation (1985) and Herb Alpert Foundation (2012, Visual Arts), awards from the Louis Comfort Tiffany Foundation (2007) and New York Foundation for the Arts (2007, with Joshua White), and grants from the National Endowment for the Arts and Art Matters, among others. His work belongs to the permanent collections of the Museum of Modern Art, Centre Pompidou, Blanton Museum of Art, Inhotim Institute (Brazil), LWL Museum für Kunst und Kultur (Munster), Migros Museum of Contemporary Art (Zurich), Paley Center for Media, and Walker Art Center, among others.
