= Tiffany Thayer =

American novelist (1902–1959)

Tiffany Ellsworth Thayer (March 1, 1902 – August 23, 1959) was an American actor, writer, and one of the founding members of the Fortean Society.

== Early life ==
Born in Freeport, Illinois, Thayer quit school at age 15 and worked as an actor, reporter, and used-book clerk in Chicago, Detroit, and Cleveland. When he was 16, he toured as the teenaged hero in the Civil War drama The Coward. Thayer first contacted American author Charles Fort in 1924.

== Career ==
In 1926, Thayer moved to New York City to act. Although he continued to harbor ambitions as a movie actor, his only known filmacting credit was in an early full-color feature The Devil on Horseback (1936).

Thayer wrote the 1930 bestseller novel Thirteen Men.

Claude H. Kendall (1890–1937) published four Tiffany Thayer novels, Thirteen Men (1930), Call Her Savage (1931), Thirteen Women (1932), and An American Girl (1933). Between 1934 and 1936, Claude H. Kendall (1890–1937) went into partnership with William Willoughby Sharp (1900–1955), a former stockbroker, as the publisher, Claude Kendall and Willoughby Sharp. In 1936, Sharp left the firm, and it went bankrupt. On Thanksgiving Day, November 25, 1937, Kendall was found beaten to death in his $7-a-week (about $125 in 2019) room on the eighth floor of the Madison Hotel, 21 East 27th Street, Manhattan. Claude Kendall and Willoughby Sharp also published Wilson Collison, and Daniel Frohman.

Many of his novels contained elements of science fiction or fantasy, including Dr. Arnoldi about a world where no-one can die.

In a profile for Twentieth Century Authors, Thayer was described as "an atheist, an anarchist – in philosophy a Pyrrhonean – and regrets the legitimacy of his birth." He listed his hobbies as painting, fencing, and book collecting.

== Fortean Society ==
By 1931 Thayer had co-founded the Fortean Society in New York City to promote Fort's ideas. Primarily based in New York City, the Society was headed by first president Theodore Dreiser, an old friend of Fort who had helped to get his work published. Early members of the original Society in New York City included Booth Tarkington, Ben Hecht, Alexander Woollcott, and H. L. Mencken. The first 6 issues of Doubt, the Fortean Society's newsletter, were each edited by a different member, starting with Dreiser. Thayer thereafter took over editorship of subsequent issues. Thayer began to assert extreme control over the society, largely filling the newsletter with articles written by himself, and excommunicating the entire San Francisco chapter, reportedly their largest and most active, after disagreements over the society's direction, and forbidding them to use the name Fortean.

During World War II, Thayer used every issue of Doubt to espouse his politics. He celebrated the escape of Gerhart Eisler, and named Garry Davis an Honorary Fellow of the Society for renouncing his American citizenship. Thayer frequently expressed opposition to Civil Defense, going to such lengths as encouraging readers to turn on their lights in defiance of air raid sirens. In contrast to the spirit of Charles Fort, he dismissed not only flying saucers as nonsense but also the atomic bomb as a hoax by the US government.

The Fortean Society Magazine (also called Doubt) was published regularly until Thayer's death in Nantucket, Massachusetts in 1959, aged 57, when the society and magazine came to an end. The magazine and society are not connected to the present-day magazine Fortean Times.

Writers Paul and Ron Willis, publishers of Anubis, acquired most of the original Fortean Society material and revived the Society as the International Fortean Organization (INFO) in the early 1960s. INFO went on to incorporate in 1965, publish a widely respected magazine, The INFO Journal: Science and the Unknown, for more than 35 years and created the world's first, and most prestigious, conference dedicated to the work and spirit of Charles Fort, the annual FortFest which continues to this day.

== Critical reception ==
Thayer wrote genre romances that were disliked by contemporary literary critics. Dorothy Parker, in a March 11, 1933 New Yorker review of An American Girl, said "He is beyond question a writer of power; and his power lies in his ability to make sex so thoroughly, graphically, and aggressively unattractive that one is fairly shaken to ponder how little one has been missing." F. Scott Fitzgerald said "curious children nosed at the slime of Mr. Tiffany Thayer in the drug-store libraries." Kunitz and Haycraft cited an anonymous reviewer who described Thayer's work as "obviously meretricious, but disclosing a narrative gift which might be used to better purpose". William Tenn, recalling Dr. Arnoldi more than sixty years after he had read it, characterized it as "absolutely fascinating---and disgusting. . . . If you ever find a copy, give it to some sf fan you dislike. Your reward will be the baffled misery in his eyes after he's read it."

== Works ==
- Eyewitness!, 1930
- The Illustrious Corpse, 1930
- Thirteen Men, 1930 New York: Claude Kendall
- The Greek. New York: Albert & Charles Boni, 1931
- Call Her Savage (1931) New York: Claude Kendall, adapted for Call Her Savage (1932)
- Five Million in Cash, 1932
- Thirteen Women. New York: Claude Kendall, 1932
- Three-sheet, 1932
- An American Girl (1933) New York: Claude Kendall.
- One Woman, 1933
- Kings and Numbers, 1934
- Doctor Arnoldi, 1934
- The Cluck Abroad, 1935
- The Old Goat, 1937
- Three Musketeers, 1939
- One-man show, 1942
- Three Musketeers and a Lady, 1950
- Mona Lisa: The Prince of Taranto, Volume One. New York: Dial Press, 1956
- Mona Lisa: The Prince of Taranto, Volume Two
- Mona Lisa: The Prince of Taranto, Volume Three

== As editor ==
- Thayer, Tiffany, ed. Fort, Charles (1941). The Books of Charles Fort. Henry Holt and Company.
- Thayer, Tiffany, ed. (1946). 33 Sardonics I Can't Forget. New York: Philosophical Library.
- Thayer, Tiffany, ed. Adults' companion (1948). New York: Lady Ann Press.

== Adaptations ==
Thayer's Call Her Savage (1931), was adapted for the film Call Her Savage (1932), starring Clara Bow and Gilbert Roland and released by Fox Film Corporation. Thayer's Thirteen Women (1932), was adapted for the film Thirteen Women (1932), starring Irene Dunne and Myrna Loy and released by RKO Radio Pictures.

== Personal life ==
Thayer was married at least three times: beginning around 1931, to Rita Tanagra (1898–1975), a well-known dancer, and later, on 22 January 1945, to Katherine McMahon (1914–1999) until his death.

== Sources ==
- Skinner, Doug (Summer 2005) "Doubting Tiffany", Fortean Times
