= Laura Liguori =

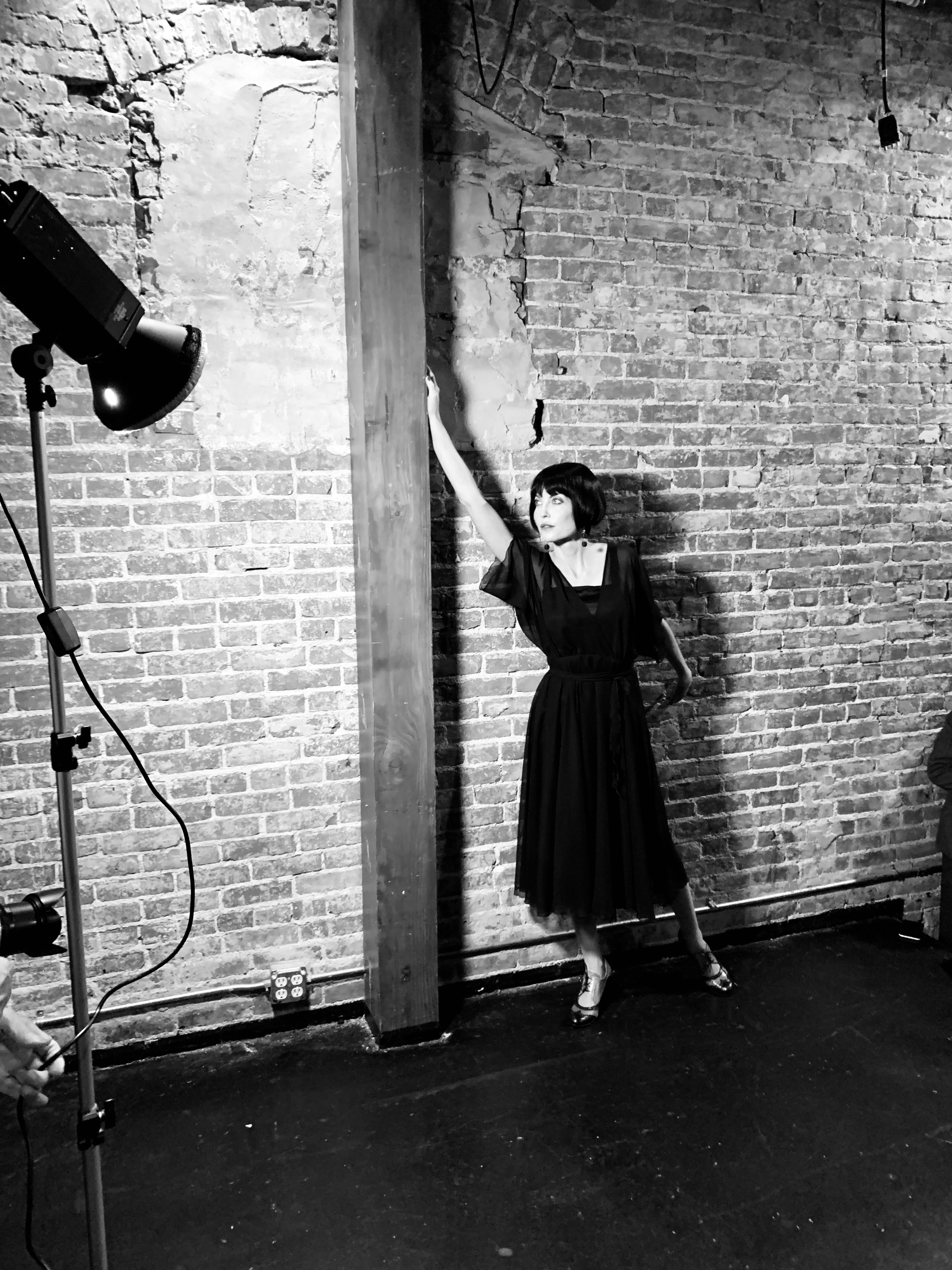
Laura Liguori playing Lilya Brik, production rehearsal of "Mayakovsky and Stalin."

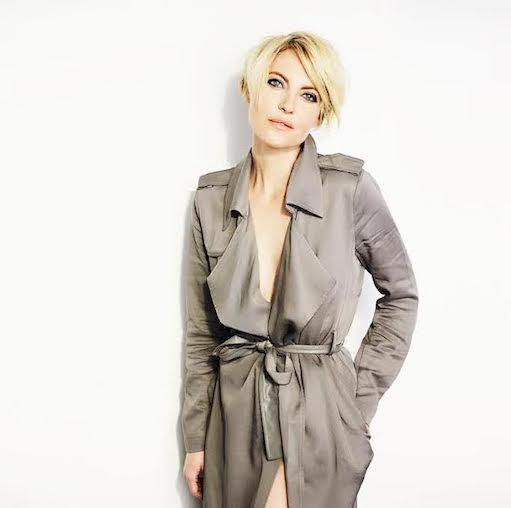
Actress Laura Liguori photographed by Theo and Juliet 2023.

Laura Liguori (Italian pronunciation: [ˈlau‧ra lih-GOU-ree']; born September 8, 1982, is an American actress, Nichiren Buddhist, and Court Appointed Child Advocate of the state of California. Liguori, grew up in Scottsdale Arizona, and began performing on stage at an early age. Liguori started her professional career with a supporting role in prestigious, avant guard director, Nina Menkes's ‘Phantom Love’ which premiered at the Sundance Film Festival (2007). Liguori, since has played supporting roles in numerous film and television roles and starred in numerous Los Angeles and New York theatrical productions.

In 2023, Laura Liguori played the recurring role of Elizabeth ShannonHouse opposite actor, Gabriel LaBelle, in Paramount Pictures television series American Gigolo.

Laura Liguori is the first actress to portray the role of 1920's Hollywood starlet ‘Peg Entwistle’ in the film “Hollywood Girl: The Peg Entwistle Story".

Laura Liguori played the role of 1930's Russian muse, Lilya Brik, in Murray Mednick's "Mayakovsky and Stalin" which premiered at the Cherry Lane Theatre in New York's East Village in 2020. Liguori a recurring actor, of playwright, Murray Mednick, played the drug addicted character, Laura, in all six of Murray Mednick's "The Gary Play Series" produced by Padua Playwrights, and Padua's production of "3 Tables" which premiered in Los Angeles in 2022 at the Zephyr Theatre in Hollywood.
