= Cryptographic log on =

Cryptographic log-on (CLO) is a process that uses Common Access Cards (CAC) and embedded Public Key Infrastructure (PKI) certificates to authenticate a user's identification to a workstation and network. It replaces the username and passwords for identifying and authenticating users. To log-on cryptographically to a CLO-enabled workstation, users simply insert their CAC into their workstation's CAC reader and provide their Personal Identification Number (PIN).

The Navy/Marine Corps Intranet, among many other secure networks, uses CLO.
