= Thirteen Women =

1932 film

- Theatrical release poster
- Directed by: George Archainbaud
- Screenplay by: Bartlett Cormack; Samuel Ornitz
- Based on: Thirteen Women; 1932 novel by Tiffany Thayer
- Produced by: David O. Selznick
- Starring: Irene Dunne; Ricardo Cortez; Jill Esmond; Myrna Loy; Florence Eldridge
- Cinematography: Leo Tover
- Edited by: Charles L. Kimball
- Music by: Max Steiner
- Distributed by: RKO Radio Pictures
- Release date: October 15, 1932
- Running time: 59 minutes
- Country: United States
- Language: English
- Budget: $125,000

Thirteen Women is a 1932 American pre-Code psychological thriller film, produced by David O. Selznick and directed by George Archainbaud. It stars Myrna Loy, Irene Dunne and Ricardo Cortez. The film is based on the 1932 bestselling novel of the same name by Tiffany Thayer and was adapted for the screen by Bartlett Cormack and Samuel Ornitz.

The film premiered in October at the Roxy Theater in New York City on October 15, 1932, then released in Los Angeles, and a few other cities in November 1932. A limited national release came in 1933. Originally running 73 minutes, the studio edited 14 minutes from the picture before release. The film was re-released in 1935 (post-Code) by RKO, hoping to turn a profit by cashing on the growing popularity of stars Dunne and Loy. Several characters were deleted from the film's final version, including those played by Leon Ames, Phyllis Fraser, and Betty Furness (in what would have been Furness's film debut at the age of 16). The film portrays only 11 women, not 13, with Fraser and Furness playing the two characters edited from the film.

Thirteen Women has been cited as an early "female ensemble" film, as well as an early influence on the "slasher film" genre.

== Plot ==
Thirteen women, who were sorority sisters at the all-girl's college St. Alban's, all write to a clairvoyant "swami" who by mail sends each a horoscope foreseeing swift doom. However, the clairvoyant is under the sway of Ursula Georgi, a half-Javanese Eurasian woman who was snubbed at school by the other women owing to her mixed-race heritage, behavior which eventually forced her to leave school. She now seeks revenge by manipulating the women into killing themselves or each other. She also goads the clairvoyant into killing himself by falling into the path of a subway train.

The victims are set up and killed off one by one until Laura Stanhope, living in Beverly Hills, is one of the few still alive. With the help of Laura's chauffeur, Ursula tries to kill Laura's young son Bobby with both tainted candy and an explosive rubber ball, but is thwarted. Ursula follows Laura and Bobby as they flee by train, unaware that police sergeant Barry Clive is escorting them. After confronting Laura, and hypnotizing her into falling asleep, Ursula enters Bobby's room and is caught by Clive. She then flees to the back of the train and jumps to her death.

== Cast ==
- Irene Dunne as Laura Stanhope
- Ricardo Cortez as Police Sergeant Barry Clive
- Jill Esmond as Jo Turner
- Myrna Loy as Ursula Georgi
- Mary Duncan as June Raskob
- Kay Johnson as Helen Dawson Frye
- Florence Eldridge as Grace Coombs
- C. Henry Gordon as Swami Yogadachi
- Peg Entwistle as Hazel Clay Cousins
- Harriet Hagman as May Raskob
- Edward Pawley as Burns, Laura's chauffeur
- Blanche Friderici as Miss Kirsten, headmistress
- Wally Albright as Bobby Stanhope
- Phyllis Fraser as Twelfth Woman (scenes deleted)
- Betty Furness as Thirteenth Woman (scenes deleted)
- Lloyd Ingraham as Inspector (uncredited)

== Production notes ==
Thirteen Women features the only film appearance of actress Peg Entwistle. Entwistle became despondent over her career and jumped to her death from the Hollywood Sign on September 16, 1932. The film premiered in New York on October 15 (almost exactly a month after her suicide), and in Los Angeles in November. Entwistle had a supporting role in the original cut, with scenes running approximately sixteen minutes. After the film performed poorly for test audiences, her screen time was cut to four minutes.

The character played by Entwistle, that of Hazel Cousins, is a married woman in the film, who kills her husband and goes to prison. In the book, Hazel is a virgin who remains so simply because she is considered too beautiful; men are either too intimidated to approach her, assume she is married or engaged or believe that she will break their heart. Hazel eventually becomes a lesbian after she is seduced by the wife of the doctor treating her for tuberculosis, and starves herself to death in a sanitarium while suffering the heartache of having been abandoned by her lover Martha. In both the book and movie, May and June Raskob (played by Harriet Hagman and Mary Duncan) are twin sisters who work in a circus, but in the book they are overweight sideshow attractions rather than photogenic trapeze artists as in the film.

In this film, actor Edward J. Pawley received his first screen kiss (from Myrna Loy). He appeared in over 50 movies during his 10-year career in Hollywood, playing mostly "bad guy" roles.

== Reception ==
On the review aggregator website Rotten Tomatoes, 60% of 10 critics' reviews are positive.

== Home media ==
On February 21, 2012, the 59-minute edit of Thirteen Women was released on manufactured-on-demand DVD through the Warner Archive Collection.
