= International Fortean Organization =

Network of professional Fortean researchers

- Abbreviation: INFO
- Named after: Charles Fort
- Formation: 1965; 61 years ago
- Founder: Ron and Paul Willis
- Type: Network
- Purpose: Network of professional Fortean researchers and writers
- Headquarters: Washington, D.C.
- Main organ: INFO Journal: Science and the Unknown
- Website: Official home page

The International Fortean Organization (INFO) is a network of professional Fortean researchers and writers. John Keel, author and parapsychologist, in both his writings and at his appearances at INFO's FortFest, said "the International Fortean Organization (INFO) carries on Charles Fort's name as successor to the Fortean Society." Keel, Colin Wilson and John Michell were long-time advisors to the organization.

== Current activities ==
The International Fortean Organization (INFO) publishes the INFO Journal: Science and the Unknown, keeps a library of Forteana and offers research service. Science Digest, in 1978, mentions their "attempts to handle inquiries from a world-wide membership". The Skeptic's Dictionary says "The International Fortean Organization publishes INFO Journal several times a year. It features stories on such topics as anomalous astronomical phenomena, anomalies in the physical sciences, scientific hoaxes and cryptozoology." The quarterly INFO Journal grew from a 54-page publication to a 69-page publication and according to Factsheet Five, a publication dedicated to the review of periodicals, by 1993 was the longest-running Fortean publication.

== History ==
John Michell and Bob Rickard in their book Unexplained Phenomena said of the International Fortean Organization "INFO was founded in 1965 as the natural successor to the original Fortean Society." Colin Wilson said he wished to assure The American Spectator that Charles Fort is far from forgotten and credited the publishing efforts of the International Fortean Organization's INFO Journal.

Una McGovern in Chamber's Dictionary of the Unexplained said, "Seven years lapsed between the demise of the Fortean Society and the formation of the International Fortean Organization (INFO)...which played a vital role in encouraging a new generation of young forteans." Although the Fortean Society was never officially dissolved their aims were continued by the International Fortean Organization according to Lewis Spence in the "Encyclopedia of Occultism and Parapsychology" and encouraged by Damon Knight who credited the organization in his introduction to the Complete Works of Charles Fort published by Dover. Martin Gardner, in a chapter devoted to Fort, which according to the Sceptic Report neither scorns or damns, in Fads and Fallacies in the Name of Science, notes that Fort doubted everything, even his own speculations. Gardner makes the point that Forteanism serves to remind science that no theory is above doubt, and that knowledge is provisional, it serves a 'sound and healthy' purpose.

The organization was formed in the early 1960s by the writers Ron and Paul Willis, two brothers who acquired much of the material of the original Fortean Society which had begun in 1932 in the spirit of Charles Fort but which had ended 1959 with the death of its founder Tiffany Thayer. The Fortean Society was formed by a friend of Charles Fort, Theodore Dreiser, who had threatened his publisher that he would leave if The Book of the Damned was not put into print. The original society included many of New York's literati including Booth Tarkington, Ben Hecht, Clarence Darrow, Alexander Woollcott and Dorothy Parker. Oliver Wendall Holmes and H.L. Mencken were also early members along with a number of fledgling science-fiction writers such as Eric Frank Russell, Edmond Hamilton and Damon Knight.

Dan Oldenburg in The Washington Post said of the all-volunteer staffed International Fortean Organization, "Its membership ranges from hard-core skeptics to top scholars to true believers -- but its cornerstone is open-mindedness."

The Willis brothers owned a bookstore in the States (Arlington, Virginia) and published such science fiction fanzines as Anubis. They enjoyed a long-time correspondence and relationship with many science fiction writers inspired by Fort, such as Fritz Leiber, Philip K. Dick, Robert Anton Wilson and, particularly Robert A. Heinlein, who remained a loyal member and friend to INFO until his death. Paul was an exceptionally avid letter and article writer and had long-running data exchanges with an international group of nascent Forteans including Bob Rickard who went on to found The News in 1967 (renamed the "Fortean Times") which was encouraged to expand with the help of corporate sponsorship. Rickard, and others, urged Paul Willis to publish. INFO was incorporated as a non-profit in 1965. The "INFO Journal: Science and the Unknown" was born shortly thereafter in the Spring of 1967.

Membership was set at $12US and Heinlein sent in a check which was framed and put on the wall. Heinlein would then send in a letter complaining that his check had not been cashed, along with suggestions for articles and improvements and, that too, would be framed and put on the wall. This incident is mentioned more than once in the "INFO Journal".

Ron Willis, with help from his brother Paul, and in collaboration with Jacques Bergier, in 1974 brought out the book, Extraterrestrial Intervention, the Evidence, published by Henry Regnary Company in the US and as in France as Le Livre de l'inexplicable by Editions Alvin Michel. The authorship (or editorship) is credited to "Jacques Bergier and the Editors of INFO" and contains many articles reprinted from the "INFO Journal".

The Willis', under the banner of the International Fortean Organization, had also started a conference called FortFest with speeches given by and largely attended by those working in the field of anomalous phenomena. Early INFO conferences included INFO members David Drake, also a long-time member of the INFO Board of Directors, would establish a career as a prolific novelist, primarily of military science fiction.

The well-known Fortean writer John Keel who frequently presented at FortFest, as often as his intermittent health permitted. was an advisor and friend to INFO and would give FortFest a generous plug during his stint as a contributing editor at Fate Magazine and be available for midnight wit and wisdom consultations. Keel also gave INFO collections of his early magazine publishing efforts which inspired many articles in the INFO Journal and which INFO lent to Board member Mark Chorvinsky who was eager to start his own magazine, Strange. Keel started his own short-lived New York Fortean Society and named Phyllis Benjamin as a Founding Member and awarded her his often called "coveted" Falling Frog Award for contributions to continuing the work of Charles Fort in 1988. Other recipients of the Falling Frog Award included notable fortean writers/researchers Doug Skinner and Antonio Huneeus.

The Willis' and an ex-pat American living in Canada who called himself Mr. X (after one of Charles Fort's unpublished novels) were concerned that Fort's works, now in the public domain, would be lost to posterity and engaged in a letter campaign. They eventually went to New York City to Dover Publications, Inc. to urge them to publish the works. Dover complied and published the books in,1974 edition with an introduction by Damon Knight, founder and then-President of the Science Fiction Writers of America, who had authored the 1971 "Charles Fort, Prophet of the Unexplained":

The Arlington post office box was moved to P.O. Box N, College Park, MD 20740 to reflect the location of the INFO offices and the INFO Library in College Park. Paul Willis relocated to College Park following the 1975 death from a brain tumor of Ron Willis. An office was found for INFO's more than 10,000+ books and large collection of clippings, files, and magazines such as the complete issues of Doubt dating back to the original Fortean Society along with letters from Theodore Dreiser, Tiffany Thayer and Ben Hecht. The original notes of Charles Fort had been donated to the New York Public Library where they remain today.

INFO rented space in the Washington, D.C. suburbs. Paul Willis named the building NO! in protest against a New Age bookstore called YES! who had rejected Bob Rickard's petition for YES! to carry the works of Charles Fort, the Fortean Times and the INFO Journal. INFO remained based in College Park for over twenty years until a fire necessitated a move in 2003. The President of the International Fortean Organization and Chairman Journal Editor during the late '80s and early '90s was Raymond D Manners of Arlington VA who researched many phenomena reports from around the world and explained them in the INFO Journal publication creating much interest.

== Sources ==
- Harvey, David (1986), Thorsons Complete Guide to Alternative Living, p. 300, Thorsons, Indiana University ISBN 0722511019
- Michell, John and Rickard Bob (2000), Enexplained Phenomena: A Rough Guide Special, p. 367, Rough Guides ISBN 1858285895
- Spence, Lewis (2003), Encyclopedia of Occultism and Parapsychology Part 1: V. 1, Edition: 3, p. 341, Kessinger Publishing ISBN 0810385708
- McGovern, Una (2007), Chambers Dictionary of the Unexplained, p. 238, Chambers Harrap Publishers Limited ISBN 0550102159
- Gardner, Martin, p. 49, Fads and Fallacies in the Name of Science ISBN 0486203948
- Oldenburg, Dan (2003), p. C1, The Man Who Has the Fringe Tied Up in Knots, Washington Post
- Wilson, Colin (1995), p. 80, The American Spectator, Saturday Evening Club, University of Virginia
- P.M.H. Atwater, Peter R. Rothschild (1999), p. 314, Future Memory, Hampton Roads Publishing ISBN 1571741356
- Skinner, Douglas (June 2005), Doubting Tiffany, Fortean Times.
- Alfvegren, Skylaire (2006), Charles Fort: Dogma Be Damned II
- Walsh, Dave (1999), Blather, issue 3no.7.
- Benjamin, Phyllis (September 2005), A Tribute to Mark Chorvinsky, Fate.
- Drake, David (2000) Newsletter #1 [1]
- Elfis, Austin ParaTimes
- Scifipedia entry "230 INFO...X-Files".
- Wilson, Colin, Alien Dawn, pp. 5, 44, 206 (FortFest, Colin Wilson and Phyllis Benjamin meet Gerald Hawkins' doppelganger)
- Keel, John, (Spring 1975), The Flying Saucer Subculture, Journal of Popular Culture, "...International Fortean Organization (INFO) carries on his name as successor to the Fortean Society." doi:10.1111/j.0022-3840.1975.00871.x
- Lumir G. Janku, (1976), "The Modern Past, Batteries and Electric Devices: The Corso Effect" http://www.altarcheologie.hI/strange
- Biography of Michael Swords, Ph.D., www.ufoevidence.org/researcher/detail17.html
- FortNite Tapes 2006, comments by Hoffberger, Arnold, Benjamin
- Notes and Letters from Robert Heinlein from the collection of the International Fortean Organization
- Cambridge Conference Correspondence, Tunguska, http://abob.libs.uga.edu/bobk/ccc/cc040501.html
- FOAFTale News, Newsletter of International Society for Contemporary Legend Research, no.37, (June 1995), Forteans Disown Book
- Helmut Optiz (2008), "World Guide to Scientific Associations and Learned Societies", p. 308, University of Michigan ISBN 3598205813
