= Fortean Times =

British monthly magazine devoted to anomalous phenomena

- Cover of issue 438, 50th anniversary special (2023)
- Editor: David Sutton
- Former editors: Bob Rickard (Founder); Paul Sieveking
- Staff writers: Jen Ogilvie
- Categories: Paranormal
- Frequency: Monthly
- Total circulation: 14,816 (December 2018)
- Founded: 1973
- First issue: November 1973 (as The News); June 1976 (as Fortean Times #16)
- Company: Metropolis International (Diamond Publishing)
- Country: United Kingdom
- Language: English
- Website: forteantimes.com
- ISSN: 0308-5899

Fortean Times is a British monthly magazine devoted to the anomalous phenomena popularised by Charles Fort. Previously published by John Brown Publishing (from 1991 to 2001), I Feel Good Publishing (from 2001 to 2005), Dennis Publishing (from 2005 to 2021), and Exponent (2021), as of December 2021 it is published by Diamond Publishing, part of Metropolis International.

In December 2018, its print circulation was just over 14,800 copies per month. The magazine's tagline is "The World of Strange Phenomena".

== History ==
=== Origin ===
The roots of the magazine that was to become Fortean Times can be traced back to Bob Rickard's discovering the works of Charles Fort through the secondhand method of reading science-fiction stories: "John Campbell, the editor of Astounding Science Fiction (as Analog was then titled), for example," writes Rickard, "encouraged many authors to expand Fort's data and comments into imaginative stories."

In the mid-1960s, while Rickard was studying product design at Birmingham Art College, he met several like-minded science-fiction fans, particularly crediting fellow student Peter Weston's fan-produced Speculation magazine as helping him to "[learn] the art of putting together a fanzine", some years before he created his own. Attending a science-fiction convention in 1968, Rickard obtained Ace paperback copies of all four of Fort's books from a stall run by Derek Stokes (later to run Dark They Were and Golden Eyed, and take a role in the day-to-day running of The Fortean Times).

After reading an advertisement in the underground magazine Oz (in 1969) for the International Fortean Organization (INFO), an American group "founded in 1966... by Paul and Ronald Willis," who had acquired material from the original Fortean Society (started in 1931, but in limbo since the 1959 death of its founder Tiffany Thayer), Rickard began to correspond with the brothers, particularly Paul. Rickard was instrumental in encouraging the Willises to publish their own Fortean journal – the INFO Journal: Science and the Unknown began intermittent publication in spring, 1967 – and sent them many British newspaper clippings, although few came to print.

Rickard later discovered that the production was fraught behind-the-scenes, as Ronald Willis had been seriously ill, Paul thus finding it difficult to "keep up with things" on his own. Ultimately, the Willises were instrumental in inspiring Rickard to create his own periodical. Ron Willis succumbed to a brain tumour in March 1975. Bearing a date of November 1973, the first issue of Rickard's self-produced and self-published The News was available directly from him.

=== The News (1973–1976) ===
The magazine which was to continue Fort's work documenting the unexplained was founded by Robert J. M. "Bob" Rickard in 1973 as his self-published, bimonthly, mail-order "hobbyish newsletter" miscellany The News — "A Miscellany of Fortean Curiosities". The title is said to be "a contraction taken from Samuel Butler's The News from Nowhere", (although Rickard may be conflating/confusing Butler's Erewhon and William Morris' News from Nowhere). The News had fairly regular bimonthly publication for 15 issues between November 1973 and April 1976. Debuting at 35p (£1.80/$4.50 for a year of six issues) for 20 pages, The News was produced on Rickard's typewriter, with headings created with Letraset, during (as Rickard says in #2) the late-1970s blackouts. The first issue featured a cover (which would become briefly the unofficial logo of The News) drawn by Rickard from a Selfridges advertisement originally created by Bernard Partridge. From the second issue, pictures and photographs from various newspapers were interpolated within the text. The price was raised slightly for #6 — which also had its page count upped to 24 pages — due in large part to rising postal and paper costs.

Helping behind the scenes was Steve Moore, a kindred spirit whom Rickard met at a comics convention when the latter was a subeditor at IPC. The two found they had much in common, including a love of Chinese mysticism, and Moore helped inspire Rickard to publish The News. The early issues featured some articles by different individuals, but were "largely the work of Bob Rickard, who typed them himself with some help from Steve Moore."

==== Key News-people ====
Moore and Paul Screeton (then editor of The Ley Hunter), both urged on the "first few uncertain issues" and Moore frequently joined Rickard to "stuff envelopes and hand-write a few hundred addresses" to disseminate the early issues. Rickard also highlights amongst the key early Fortean Times advocates and supporters: Ion Alexis Will, who discovered The News in 1974 and became a "constant [source] of valuable clippings, books, postcards, and entertaining letters"; Janet and Colin Bord, later authors of Mysterious Britain (Janet also wrote for Flying Saucer Review and Lionel Beer's Spacelink, while Colin's Fortean article in Gandalf's Garden was particularly cited by Rickard as bringing him/them to his attention); Phil Ledger, a "peripatetic marine biologist", and The News' "first enthusiastic fan"; Ken Campbell, Fortean theatre director and playwright; John Michell; graphic designer Richard Adams and Dick Gwynn, who both helped with the evolving layout and typesetting of later issues; Chris Squire, who helped organise the first subscription database; Canadian "Mr. X"; Mike Dash; and cartoonist Hunt Emerson. Emerson was introduced to Rickard in late 1974, when after seven issues, he "wanted to improve the graphics", which Emerson certainly did, providing around 30 headings for use in issues #8 onwards. (Emerson's still-on-going monthly "Phenomenomix" strip in FT had its prototype in #11's three-page "Fortean Funnies").

==== Notable News content ====
Other early contributors included writer and researcher Nigel Watson (chairman of the Scunthorpe UFO Research Society), who wrote "Mysterious Moon" for The News #2. Watson later wrote a regular column of UFO commentary entitled Enigma Variations (from #29), and articles on the subject of UFO-related murders and stories of sexual assault by aliens. Phil Grant wrote about Ley lines for #3, and Mary Caine, who revised an earlier article (from Gandalf's Garden) on The Glastonbury Zodiac for issue #4, which also had the debut of the "Reviews" section, beginning with comments on a book by John Michell, the Sphere reprint of Charles Fort's New Lands and John Sladek's The New Apocrypha. Issues #2 and #3 noted, The News was published "with an arrangement with INFO", this was revised from #4 to it being "affiliated to the International Fortean Organization". From #5, Mark A. Hall produced a section entitled "Fortean USA", continuing on from his earlier, discontinued, newsletter From My Files; issue #5 also had William Porter's article on Llandrillo printed, after being delayed from #4 for space constraints. Janet Bord contributed "Some Fortean Ramblings" alongside William R. Corliss's "The Evolution of the Fortean Sourcebooks" for #7, and issue #8 was the first issue of volume 2, after Rickard decided to end volume 1 with #7 (not #6 as fully bimonthly titles do), since that issue was dated November '74, thereby attempting to keep each volume aligned with a year.

Issue #8 (or, volume 2, issue #1) got the special "Christmas present" of headings by Hunt Emerson, after Rickard was introduced to Emerson by Carol and Nick Moore, as Hunt was working on Large Cow Comix. Described by Rickard as "as much a disciple of George [Herriman]... and my [Rickard's] favourite artists from Mad (Bill Elder and Wally Wood)" as Rickard was of Charles Fort, the two got on well, with Emerson producing not only a series of headings, but also later strips and covers for issues to the present. The death of INFO co-founder Ron Willis was announced in #9, which described itself as providing "bimonthly notes on Fortean phenomena", and an index to the first year's issues (#1–7) became available. Colin Bord penned "Amazing Menagerie" for issue #10, while Paul Devereux and Andrew York compiled an exhaustive study of Leicestershire in "Portrait of a Fault Area", serialised in #11–12. Issue #11 featured Rickard and Emerson's first "Fortean Funnies" cartoon, while #12 had a price rise to 50p/$1.25, a logo change (from Selfridges' herald-on-horseback to the more descriptive Fort's face-encircled) and a tweaking of its tagline to "bimonthly news & notes on Fortean phenomena." Issue #14 first mentioned Rickard and Michell's then-in-production book Phenomena!, which would be more actively trailed from #18. Issue #15 — now with 28 pages — announced that Rickard had decided to bow to popular opinion and retitle his miscellany with a more descriptive title. Thus, with a subtitle of "Portents & Prodigies", Fortean Times was born.

=== Fortean Times (since 1976) ===
After 15 issues of The News, issue #16 (1976) had the magazine renamed Fortean Times, which "new title emerged from correspondence between Bob Rickard and Paul Willis" — the two having talked of creating a Fortean version of The Times newspaper, "full of weird and wonderful news and read by millions worldwide". Its cover bore the descriptive text "Strange phenomena — curiosities — prodigies — portents — mysteries," while the inside cover kept the "Fort face" logo from later issues of The News, but bore the revised legend "A Contemporary Record of Strange Phenomena". Included within was an offer for a "4-colour silk-screened poster" created by Hunt Emerson for this landmark issue. From the start, this new format compounded earlier financial difficulties for Rickard, following on from #14's plea: "we need more subscribers or we die!". (Fortean Times issues #16–18 — as The News #1–15 before them — were solely edited, published, and in large part written and typed by Rickard himself. Even by passing on rising postal and paper costs to the readership, which Rickard constantly reiterates that he is loath to do, the early Fortean Times was constantly facing an uphill financial battle.) Early editorials of the new FT, therefore (in fact beginning with The News #15) featured a notification of donations received, naming and thanking the hardcore readership (which included many current and future contributors) for monies received, which aided the move towards higher production values. With donations helping to offset costs, the price was held at 50p until issue #20, whereupon the magazine dropped to a quarterly schedule from Spring 1977 (issue #21) — but raised the page count (and price) to continue producing the same amount of material for the same yearly fee (40 pg, 75p ea. or £3/year).

Issue #18 received a new semiregular feature entitled "Forteana Corrigenda", aimed at correcting "errors in the literature" that had crept into various Fortean works through misquotation or other difficulties. After 18 more-or-less solo-produced issues, long-term supporter and helper Steve Moore was credited as assistant editor for issues #19–21, becoming co-contributing editor (with Phil Ledger, Stan Nichols, and Paul J. Willis) on issues #22–26 and associate editor from issue #27. He was joined by contributing editor David Fideler, and subsequently (also as co-associate editor) by Paul Sieveking (#28— ) and Valerie Thomas (#31–32). Issue #20 announced that Kay Thompson (a staff member of Ley Hunter magazine, then under the editorship of Paul Devereux, with whom FT shared an address for several issues) would be helping to type parts of subsequent issues to further delegate the burden from Rickard. Moore, Sieveking, and he were also later joined editorially by author Mike Dash (who is mentioned as particularly overseeing the publication of scholarly occasional papers), before Moore moved from full editorial to largely correspondent duties for a dozen issues after #42, returning as a contributing editor in Autumn 1990 (#55). The four — Rickard, Sieveking, Dash, and Moore — are often collectively referred to as "the Gang of Fort", after the Gang of Four.

Issue #21 had the debut of FT semiregular column "Strange Deaths" (later descriptively subtitled "Unusual ways of shuffling off this mortal coil"), while issue #22 updated FT's to include (Ivan T. Sanderson's) The Society for the Investigation of the Unexplained, alongside INFO. Issue #23 featured an article by Robert Anton Wilson on, aptly, "The 23 Phenomenon," made available a second index (1975, to The News #8–13) and included a 12-page "Review Supplement", issued as a separately bound supplement since the then-printers had difficulty binding more than 40 pages. With #24, the printers were changed to Windhorse Press to overcome this difficulty, and FT became officially 52 pages in length, the changes cemented in issue #25 with a new font for the title and a change of address — c/o London-based "SF and cosmic" bookshop Dark They Were and Golden Eyed, run by Derek Stokes (who had sold Rickard the four Fort books 10 years previously). The same issue ran an obituary for Eric Frank Russell, of whom Rickard was a considerable fan. He writes that Russell turned down an invitation to contribute material to The News back in 1973, having "earned his rest" after 40 years as an active Fortean. Rickard further states that Russell was one of the key Fortean-fiction writers he read in Campbell's Astounding Science Fiction and Analog, and the author of "the first Fortean book I [Rickard] ever read": Russell's Great World Mysteries. Issue #26 trailed "a special series of 'Occasional Papers' in Fortean subjects" to be edited by Steve Moore, and #27 — the 5th Anniversary issue — welcomed Michigan-native David Fideler (whose Anomaly Research Bulletin was then due to cease publication, although its subscribers, FT promised, would be absorbed by them) as FT's "man in the New World".

==== Paul Sieveking and FT's format change ====
In 1978, mutual friend Ion Will introduced Rickard to Paul Sieveking, who recalls, "the Forteans used to meet every Tuesday afternoon above the science-fiction bookshop Dark They Were and Golden Eyed in Soho to open post and interact. (Indeed, this was the semiofficial address of FT until that shop closed. With #35, Summer '81, the address was changed.)" Sieveking joined the FT team with #28 as co-associate editor, and writes, highlighting the intrinsic early difficulties in printing FT that that issue "was printed by an Israeli entrepreneur in northern Greece and shipped to London." That issue (#28), bearing a cover blurb of "Strange Phenomena", featured an early advertisement for the bookshop Dark They Were and Golden Eyed, drawn by Bryan Talbot, while the editorial promised that the next issue would not only see the availability of Index 1976, but also be in a "larger and more professional format, typeset throughout, [with] better graphics, layout, and legibility."

Indeed, #29, under a cover by Hunt Emerson, was printed fully typeset in A4 (thanks to art director Richard Adams of AdCo, and, according to Rickard's preface to Yesterday's News Tomorrow, Dick Gwynn) and even distributed on a limited basis through WH Smiths. The move away from production on Rickard's typewriter gave "The Journal of Strange Phenomena," (as it was now subtitled) greater ability to produce longer, better laid-out articles. These opened with a seven-page guide to "Charles Fort and Fortean Times" by Bob Rickard, explaining the background and philosophy of FT, as well as outlining the influence of Fort, "who is still largely unknown", writes Rickard, and also included the first of Nigel Watson's "Enigma Variations" columns and Loren Coleman's "Devil Names and Fortean Places" article sat alongside comments by Colin Bord, Tim Dinsdale, V. G. W. Harrison, and Rickard on Anthony "Doc" Shiels' 1977 "Nessie" photographs. The magazine itself dropped the description 'non-profitmaking' from its publication information, and ceased to name its stated affiliations to INFO, SITU, and "other Fortean journals" in favour of the more general aim to be a "friend to all groups and magazines continuing the work of Charles Fort". It also contained a considerably higher number of advertisements, including both inside covers — making the page count slightly higher than previous issues, which had previously counted the cover as page 1 — and an early advertisement by Brian Bolland for Forbidden Planet (which would ironically begin to take off only after the closure of Stokes' bookshop).

Issue #30 announced that while "over the last couple of issues [the] subscriber list... nearly doubled," so too had the "printing, production, and postage bill," necessitating a price rise to 95p/$2.50 — albeit softened by another length increase, to 68 pages. Now published not merely by Rickard, but by Fortean Times Ltd, it was typeset by Warpsmith Graphics and printed by Bija Press. The cover was painted by Una Woodruff (whose Inventorum Natura was reviewed within) to illustrate John Michell's article on "Spontaneous Images and Acheropites," drawing on his 1979 Thames & Hudson book dealing with — and titled — Simulacra. Bob Rickard produced an article on one "Clemente Dominguez: Pope, Heretic, Stigmatic"; Michael Hoffman speculated on the occult aspects of a serial killer in "The Sun of Sam"; Robert J. Schadewald wrote about "The Great Fish Fall of 1859", while Hunt Emerson produced the first cartoon strip under the title "Phenomenomix".

Sieveking took over full editorial duties from Rickard with #43, helming the subsequent four quarterly issues (to #46) to give Rickard a chance to "revitalize", which he did, returning with #46 to the position of co-editor. Moore, Dash, and Ian Simmons (and others) variously edited the magazine for the next 18+ years, and although main editorship passed from Rickard and Sieveking to David Sutton in 2002, they both continued to contribute. Sieveking semiretired at the end of 2019, handing most of the "Strange Days" news editor role to Christopher Josiffe. Sieveking continues to write the archaeology column, compile the "Extra, Extra" section, and edit the letters pages, also acting as the main quality-control proof-reader (as well as producing an occasional feature). Sieveking's wife Val Stevenson was book-review editor for several years, eventually passing this role on to David V. Barrett in 2019.

During the 40+ years of its publication, Fortean Times has changed both format and publishers on a few occasions. Early issues (particularly of The News) were produced in black and white (for ease of photocopying), and the whole was largely produced by typewriter until #29. Colour, professional printing, and wider distribution followed, and a 6.5- x 4.5-in size held sway for several years before the magazine settled into its "normal" A4 (magazine) size in the 1980s, after which glossy covers followed. Several changes of logo and font have occurred throughout its life.

== General content ==
The identification of correct original sources by contributors is a defining feature of the magazine, as it was for Charles Fort himself. However, the "objective reality" of these reports is not as important. The magazine "maintains a position of benevolent scepticism towards both the orthodox and the unorthodox" and "toes no party line". The range of subject matter is extremely broad, including:

- General Forteana
- Anomalous phenomena
- Apparitions
- Bizarre deaths
- Conspiracy theories
- Crop circles
- Cryptozoology
- Cults and would-be Messiahs and prophets
- Fringe science
- Hoaxes
- Millennialism, eschatology, and cases of mass hysteria
- Mutants (human and animal)
- Parapsychology
- Religious phenomena (stigmata, appearances and simulacra and miracles, etc.)
- Natural simulacra
- Unidentified flying objects
- Urban legends

Fortean Times also frequently covers the Ig Nobel Prizes, as well as unusual aspects of mainstream science and research.

=== Current content ===
The magazine's current regular contents include:

- Three or four feature articles
- Strange Days, a wide-ranging overview of odd and interesting stories mostly culled from the world's newspapers. Some feature in particular sections, including:
  - Science
  - Archaeology (usually by Paul Sieveking and Paul Devereux)
  - Ghosts, in a column titled Ghostwatch (by Alan Murdie)
  - Alien Zoo, Dr. Karl Shuker's regular discussion of cryptozoological matters
  - Necrolog, obituaries of Fortean-relevant individuals
  - Strange deaths, a long-running round-up of the odd manners in which some people meet their ends
  - UFO Files/Saucers of the Damned is by Nigel Watson who provides a "regular survey of the latest fads and flaps from the world of ufology"; "UFO Files/UFO Casebook" is Jenny Randles' "round-up of sightings and hot-spots from around the world"

Clippings for most of Strange Days' stories are requested from, and supplied by, the readers of FT

- Mythconceptions, which debunks modern myths, old wives' tales, etc. (in a similar manner to, for example, Snopes.com)
- Classical Corner, in which Barry Baldwin reviews Fortean events from ancient times
- Fortean Bureau of Investigation, which typically revisits and reassesses older Fortean cases
- Forum, featuring three or four shorter articles on diverse topics
- Reviews of Fortean, science fiction/fantasy and related books, films and computer games
- A letters page, incorporating:
  - Simulacra Corner, photographs submitted by readers of (typically) naturally occurring objects which appear to be in the shape of something else
  - "it happened to me...", readers’ stories of strange personal occurrences
- Fortean Traveller, “a guide to various sites of interest to the traveling Fortean”
- Phenomenomix, a comic strip by Hunt Emerson

== Praise and criticism ==
Most of the articles in Fortean Times are written in the style of objective journalism, but this is not a mandatory requirement, and some articles focus on a specific theory or point of view. Although such articles are presented as the opinion of the author and not the editors (who claim to have no opinions), this has occasionally led to controversy. In January 1997, the magazine ran an article by David Percy under the headline "FAKE! Did NASA hoax the moon landing photos?". The article outraged many readers and led to the magazine's most vigorous postbag up to that time. In August 2000, the magazine's cover headline was "UFO? The shocking truth about the first flying saucers". The article in question, by James Easton, proposed a mundane explanation for Kenneth Arnold's sighting — American white pelicans. This suggestion so outraged ufologists that many of them still use the term "pelican" or "pelicanist" as a pejorative term for a debunker.

Most Fortean researchers contribute articles, criticism, or letters to the magazine. It has also attracted more widespread coverage and praise. Fortean Times #69 claims, "extracts from FT have featured in at least three publications used for teaching English as a foreign language." Lynn Barber of The Independent on Sunday newspaper described writing in FT as "a model of elegant English."

== UnConvention ==
The magazine has organised an "UnConvention" (or UnCon), most years since 1994 (the "missing" years being 2001, 2005, and 2009), at various venues in London (the University of London Union, the Institute of Education, the Commonwealth Institute, and in recent years, Friends House). Many "hot topics" of the day have been discussed, such as the Ray Santilli "alien autopsy" film at the 1996 UnCon, and the death of Diana, Princess of Wales at the 1998 event, which also saw Lynn Picknett and Clive Prince discussing Templar conspiracies and hidden symbolism in the paintings of Leonardo da Vinci, years before these were turned into mass-media subjects by The Da Vinci Code. Besides the formal lecture programme, UnCon normally features exhibits by organizations such as the Association for the Scientific Study of Anomalous Phenomena and the Centre for Fortean Zoology. The event often ends with a panel discussion, as was the case in 2002, when the subject was "Is Ufology Dead?". This was widely reported in the British media as an "official" statement by Fortean Times that "Ufology is Dead".

== Related projects ==
Fortean Studies, the magazine's more academic sister publication published yearly volumes in the late 1990s. The seventh and last issue was published in 2001.

Its website tracks Fortean news stories and holds a small archive of articles and photographs. For many years, it also supported a busy internet forum for the discussion of Fortean topics. With the advent of GDPR legislation in 2018, this forum was moved to the website of the Charles Fort Institute.

The magazine has also occasionally published both academic and lighthearted books on various aspects of Forteana.

== Collections and spin-off books ==
Many of the earliest issues of FT were collected in book format in the early 1990s. In recent years, the print volumes have been overtaken by digital files, available on CD. In addition, several smaller collections have been compiled on various themes and sold, or given away as 'free gifts' with the magazine. A more academic journal, Fortean Studies, has also been printed and is an ongoing venture. In the late 1990s Polygram Spoken Word released an audio version of several Fortean stories, written and produced by Steve Deakin-Davies and featured Brian Cant and Joanna Bowen amongst its actors, this project was licensed from John Brown Publishing.( (c) 1997 Polygram Record operations ltd, Speaking Volumes no: 5361444)

=== Fortean Tomes ===
Starting in the very early 1990s, Fortean Times produced a number of facsimile editions collecting the earliest issues of the magazine, in their entirety, including advertisements. These collections, prepared and edited for print by Paul Sieveking (including hand corrections to early typographic errors) are now out-of-print. Although demand was such to warrant reprints of several volumes, after collecting up to #77 FT decided that the previous volumes had not sold well enough to continue completely up to date. (Concern over the likely cost of reprinting issues in the new full colour format led to a publishing decision to stockpile 500 unbound run-on copies of each number to provide the basis of future reprint editions, and this project resulted in one further collection — Snakes Alive!, collecting #93–97 — but the in-between issues #78–92 have not yet been collected in trade format.)

(The early collections, like the earliest magazines, were published in smaller, 6.5 x 4.5in format)

- Yesterday's News Tomorrow: Fortean Times Issues 1–15 (John Brown Publishing, 1992 2nd ed. 1995) ISBN 1-870870-26-3
- Diary of a Mad Planet: Fortean Times Issues 16–25 (John Brown Publishing Ltd, 2nd ed. 1995) ISBN 1-870021-25-8
- Seeing Out the Seventies: Fortean Times Issues 26–30 (John Brown Publishing Ltd, 1990) ISBN 1-870021-20-7
- Gateways to Mystery: Fortean Times Issues 31–36 (John Brown Publishing Ltd, 1993) ISBN 1-870870-37-9
- Heaven's Reprimands: Fortean Times Issues 37–41 (John Brown Publishing Ltd, 1994) ISBN 1-870870-52-2
- If Pigs Could Fly: Fortean Times Issues 42–46 (John Brown Publishing Ltd, 1994) ISBN 1-870870-47-6
- Fishy Yarns: Fortean Times Issues 47–51 (John Brown Publishing Ltd, 1994) ISBN 1-870870-48-4
- Bonfire of the Oddities: Fortean Times Issues 52–56 (John Brown Publishing Ltd, 1995) ISBN 1-870870-61-1
- Strange Attractors: Fortean Times Issues 57–62 (John Brown Publishing Ltd, 1996) ISBN 1-870870-73-5

(The later collections were of a larger — A4 — size)

- Plumber from Lhasa: Fortean Times Issues 63–67 (John Brown Publishing Ltd, 1996) ISBN 1-870870-79-4
- Memories of Hell: Fortean Times Issues 68–72 (John Brown Publishing Ltd, 1997) ISBN 1-870870-90-5
- Mouthful of Mysteries: Fortean Times Issues 73–77 (John Brown Publishing Ltd, 1998) ISBN 1-870870-66-2
- Snakes Alive!: Fortean Times Issues 93–97 (John Brown Publishing Ltd, 1998) ISBN 1-902212-04-5
  - "Fortean Times" Index by Steve Moore (John Brown Publishing Ltd, October 1997) ISBN 1-870870-68-9

==== CDs ====
Around 2005, FT began to release a series of digital archives. Beginning with more recent issues (presumably for reasons of ease — more recent issues would be more readily available as digital files), they have also begun to re-release the earliest issues — apparently the digital archive CD format has taken over from print collections.

- Issues 1–15 CD (The complete The News)
- Issues 16–25 CD
- Issues 26–30 CD
  - Issues 1–30 3-CD boxset
- 2001 CD Archive (Issues 142–153)
- 2002 CD Archive (Issues 154–165)
- 2003 CD Archive (Issues 166–178)
- 2004 CD Archive (Issues 179–191)
- 2005 CD Archive (Issues 192–204)
- 2006 CD Archive (Issues 205–217)
  - 2002–2005 Four-CD Archive

=== Fortean Studies ===
A sister publication, Fortean Studies, began in the mid-1990s and was edited by Steve Moore. In the words of frequent contributor Neil Nixon, it "compiled serious research and opinion on a range of paranormal and conspiracy-related issues", and was a more academic counterpart to FT.

- Rickard, Bob (producer) & Moore, Steve (ed.) Fortean Studies: Volume 1 (John Brown Publishing Ltd, 1994) ISBN 1-870870-55-7
- Rickard, Bob (producer) & Moore, Steve (ed.) Fortean Studies: Volume 2 (John Brown Publishing Ltd, 1995) ISBN 1-870870-70-0
- Rickard, Bob (producer) & Moore, Steve (ed.) Fortean Studies: Volume 3 (John Brown Publishing Ltd, 1996) ISBN 1-870870-82-4
- Rickard, Bob (producer) & Moore, Steve (ed.) Fortean Studies: Volume 4 (John Brown Publishing Ltd, 1998) ISBN 1-870870-96-4
- Rickard, Bob (producer) & Moore, Steve (ed.) Fortean Studies: Volume 5 (John Brown Publishing Ltd, 1998) ISBN 1-902212-14-2
- Rickard, Bob (producer) & Moore, Steve (ed.) Fortean Studies: Volume 6 (John Brown Publishing Ltd, 1999) ISBN 1-902212-20-7
- Simmons, Ian & Quin, Melanie (eds.) Fortean Studies: Volume 7 (John Brown Publishing Ltd, 2001) ISBN 1-902212-36-3

=== Other titles ===
- Wild Man: China's Yeti by Yuan Zhenxin and Huang Wanpo with Fan Jingquan and Zhou Xinyan, edited and introduced by Steve Moore. Fortean Times Occasional Paper no.1, 1981. No ISBN or ISSN assigned
- Toad in the Hole: Source Material on the Entombed Toad Phenomenon selected and annotated by Bob Skinner. Fortean Times Occasional Paper no.2, 1986. ISSN 0260-5856
- The Halifax Slasher: An Urban Terror in the North of England by Michael Goss. Fortean Times Occasional Paper no.3, 1987. ISSN 0260-5856
- The World's Most Incredible Stories: The Best of Fortean Times by Adam Sisman and Hunt Emerson (May 1992)
- Fortean Times 1993 Diary by Paul Sieveking (December 1992)
- "Fortean Times" Book of Strange Deaths compiled by Steve Moore, illustrated by Etienne (John Brown Publishing Ltd 1994) ISBN 1-870870-50-6
  - US edition: The Comedian Who Choked to Death on a Pie—and the Man Who Quit Smoking at 116: A Collection of Incredible Lives and Unbelievable Deaths (November 1996)
- "Fortean Times" Book of Weird Sex (September 1995)
- "Fortean Times" Book of Life's Losers by Ian Simmons, illustrated by Geoff Coupland (October 1996)
- "Fortean Times" Book of Inept Crime compiled by Steve Moore, illustrated by Geoff Coupland (October 1996)
  - US edition: The World's Stupidest Criminals (June 1998)
- "Fortean Times" Book of Exploding Pigs and Other Strange Animal Stories by Ian Simmons (October 1997)
- "Fortean Times" Book of Bizarre Behaviour by Ian Simmons (October 1998)
- "Fortean Times" Book of More Strange Deaths by Paul Sieveking (October 1998)
- "Fortean Times" Book of Unconventional Wisdom (1999)
- "Fortean Times" Book of Close Shaves by Steve Moore (John Brown Publishing Ltd October 1999) ISBN 1-902212-18-5
- "Fortean Times" Book of Medical Mayhem by Paul Sieveking and Ian Simmons (October 1999)
- "Fortean Times" Book of the Millennium by Kevin McClure (September 1996)
- "Fortean Times" Presents UFO: 1947–1997 – 50 Years of Flying Saucers by Dennis Stacy and Hilary Evans (May 1997)
- Aliens Ate My Trousers: Crazy Comics from the Pages of "Fortean Times" by Hunt Emerson (March 1998)
- Weird Year 1996: The Best of Strange Days by James Wallis and Joe McNally (November 1995)
- Weird World 1999 by Mark Pilkington and Joe McNally (November 1998)
  - (Barmy Sutra by David Sutton — planned for 2001; unpublished)

== See also ==
- Fortean TV
- List of magazines of anomalous phenomena
