= James Godwin =

United States admiral

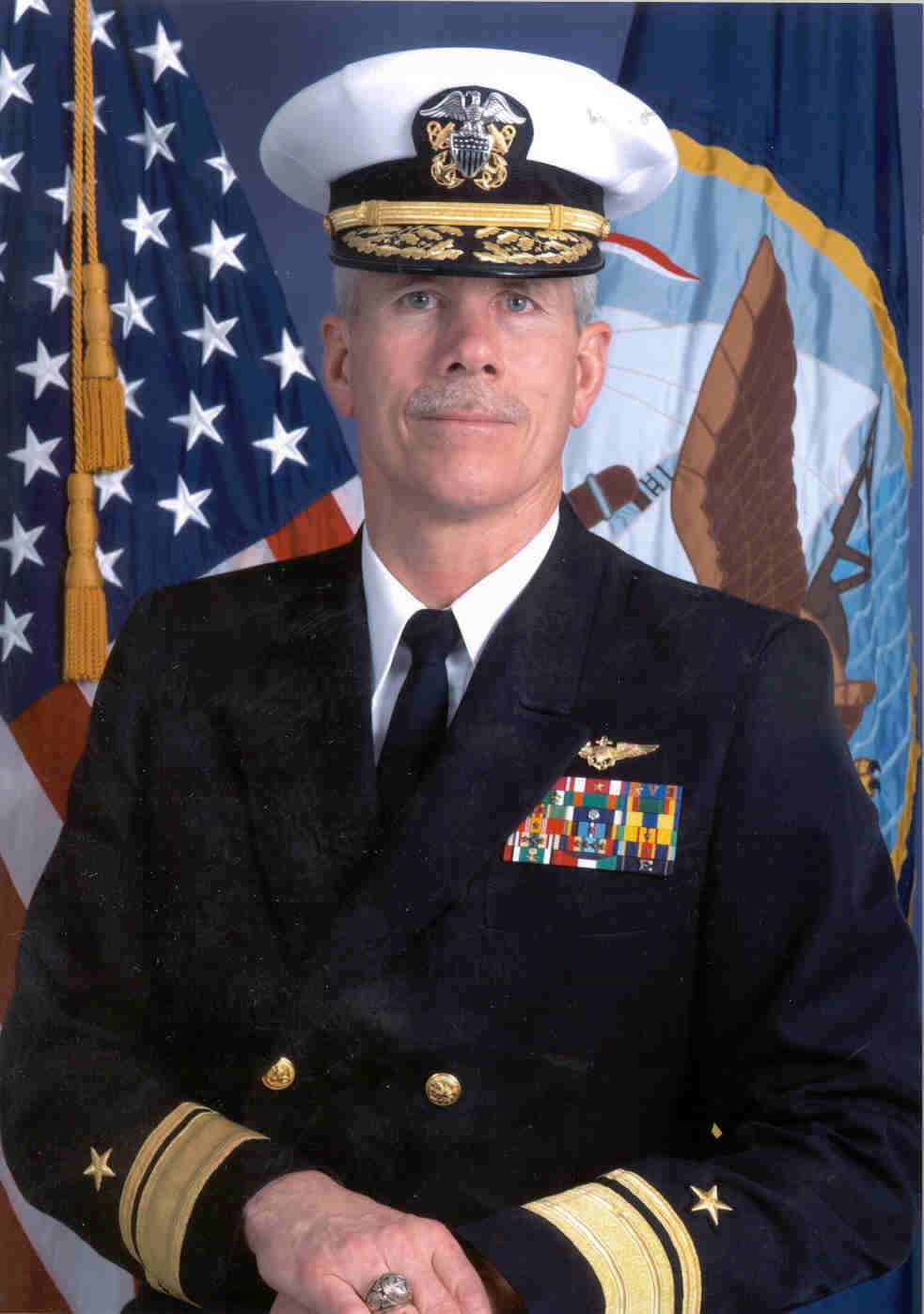
Rear Adm. James B. Godwin III

James Basil "Gib" Godwin III (born February 6, 1951), a retired Rear Admiral (upper half) of the United States Navy, was the Program Executive Officer – Enterprise Information Systems of the Department of the Navy. His responsibilities included oversight of the Navy/Marine Corps Intranet.

== Early life ==
Born in Fort Worth, Texas and raised in San Antonio, Godwin graduated from Churchill High School in 1969. He received a scholarship to play football for Tulane University, where he played the tight end position and caught the game-winning touchdown pass in a 10–0 upset victory over Boston College in 1972. Godwin earned a Bachelor of Science in Civil Engineering from Tulane in 1973. He was directly commissioned as an Ensign into the United States Navy and subsequently received his Naval Aviator wings in July 1975.

== Military career ==
Godwin's initial tours include numerous fleet assignments with VA-147, VA-122, Air Wing 9, VFA-125, and VFA-25. During those tours, he flew the A-7 Corsair II and the F/A-18 Hornet. From March 1991 until June 1992, he served as a Commanding Officer of Strike Fighter Squadron 192 (VFA-192) while embarked on the USS Midway (CV-41) and the USS Independence (CV-62). As a combat veteran during his command tour, Godwin amassed 34 Desert Storm missions.

After detaching from VFA-192, he reported to the Naval Air Systems Command (NAVAIR) where he began his career in Navy acquisition. This career path, as the lead systems engineer, Deputy Program Manager and ultimately the F/A-18 Program Manager, led to the position of Program Executive Officer for Tactical Aircraft (PEO(T)) in April 2000, which included the procurement of all tactical aircraft and weapons systems on the Navy's aircraft carriers. In addition, Godwin co-led the NAVAIR Warfighter Focus Group, which was tasked with balancing near-term and future readiness of the aviation fleet.

Godwin managed a network of aviation technology experts and program managers, tasked with delivering tactical aircraft and weapon systems to the fleet. These programs included delivering the cornerstone of Naval Aviation, F/A-18E/F Super Hornet, as well as the early operational fielding of the Advanced Targeting Forward Looking Infrared, Multifunctional Information Distribution System, the Shared Reconnaissance Pod, Improved Capability III Airborne Electronic Attack system, and latest version of the AIM-9 Sidewinder missile, the AIM-9X. Systems under development included the Active Electronically Scanned Array (AESA) radar for the Super Hornet, an Electronically Scanned Radar for the E-2 Advanced Hawkeye, and the U.S Navy's replacement for the EA-6B Prowler, the EA-18G Growler aircraft.

Godwin assumed command as the Director of the Navy Marine Corps Intranet (NMCI) in September 2004. In May 2005 under a reorganization, he was named Direct Reporting Program Manager for NMCI, and under another reorganization in February he became the Program Executive Officer Enterprise Information Systems. He was a direct report to the Assistant Secretary of the Navy for Research, Development and Acquisition and was responsible for delivering an enterprise-wide computer network for Navy and Marine Corps, one of the most transformational contracting initiatives ever undertaken by the Department of the Navy. With the goal of connecting approximately 400,000 "seats," the NMCI network is the largest single integrated network in the world and represents the largest federal information technology contract ever awarded.

Godwin retired from active duty in 2006.

== Awards and accolades ==
His awards include the Legion of Merit (four awards), Meritorious Service Medal (two awards), Air Medal with Strike/Flight (three awards), Air Medal (with Combat "V"), Navy Commendation Medal (three awards including one Combat "V"), Navy Achievement Medal, Navy Expert Pistol Medal, and several unit awards and citations.

== Personal ==
Godwin is the son of James Basil Godwin Jr. and Cora Lee "Corky" (Leutwyler) Godwin. His father was a naval aviator during World War II, serving as a Coronado Flying Boat pilot.

Godwin and his wife Karen have four children.
