= Laurie Rosenwald =

American author, artist and designer (born 1955)

- Born: 1955 (age 70–71)
- Education: Rhode Island School of Design
- Known for: Illustration, Graphic Design, Painting, Author
- Website: Rosenworld.com

Laurie Rosenwald (born 1955) is an American author, artist, Emmy-nominated animator, and principal of rosenworld, a design studio. A New York City native, she graduated from Rhode Island School of Design with a degree in painting. She is a recipient of awards from the Type Directors Club, Art Directors Club, American Illustration, Print Magazine, Communication Arts and AIGA. She lives in Manhattan.

== Career ==
As a designer, Laurie has worked for Ikea, Sony Music, Warner Bros., The Sundance Channel, Bloomingdale's, J. Walter Thompson, Bravo, Conde Nast, The Whitney Museum, Vintage Books, Little Brown, Houghton Mifflin Harcourt, and Knopf, among countless others. Her typeface, Loupot, designed in collaboration with Cyrus Highsmith, is published by Occupant Fonts.

Her illustrations have appeared in The New Yorker, The New York Times, New York Magazine, The Atlantic, The Wall Street Journal, Vanity Fair, The Baffler, and many other publications. Her collaboration with the writer David Sedaris, "David's Diary," is an animated app for iPad and iPhone.

She has authored and illustrated How to Makes Mistakes on Purpose (Hachette), All the Wrong People Have Self-Esteem (Bloomsbury), And to Name but Just a Few: Red, Yellow, Green, Blue (Blue Apple Books), and New York Notebook (Chronicle Books).

Her paintings have been exhibited by Sotheby’s, Chashama, and Spring/Break Art Show 2020 and 2021, in New York, Galerie Pixi in France, and Galleri Konstepidemin in Sweden. A large mural in encaustic has been installed at Target Corporation's New York City headquarters, and on Times Square billboards for Target as well.

She has taught both Graphic Design and Illustration at School of Visual Arts and Parsons School of Design, as well as NYU, and Pratt Institute.

As a writer, Rosenwald's humor pieces can be found in the books, "101 Damnations" and "Mirth of a Nation", and she is often featured in The American Bystander as both writer and artist.

She has written essays for Communication Arts where her articles include How to Make Mistakes on Purpose, Illustration: Graphic Design’s Poor Relation, and Mutant Bastard Yucky Colors of the Apocalypse.

Rosenwald has a second career as emcee and comedian. She appeared as "Woman" in Season Five Episode One of The Sopranos.

== How to Make Mistakes on Purpose ==
Rosenwald runs a popular creativity workshop, "How to Make Mistakes on Purpose", which has been hosted by schools and corporations in both North America and Europe, including Johnson & Johnson, Kurt Andersen's Studio 360, TEDx, Starbucks, Google, Adobe, BuzzFeed, Art Directors Club, AIGA New York, Edenspiekermann in Berlin and schools such as RISD, MICA, Camberwell and CalArts.

The details of this workshop remain a mystery, as participants are sworn to secrecy. With the November, 2021 release of How to Make Mistakes on Purpose, these secrets are at last revealed.
