= Operation Cyber Condition Zebra =

Operation Cyber Condition Zebra is a network operations campaign conducted by the United States Navy to deny network intrusion and establish an adequate computer network defense posture to provide defense-in-depth and warfighting capability. The operation specifies that perimeter security for legacy networks will deny intrusions and data infiltration, that firewalls will be maintained through risk assessment and formal adjudication of legacy application waiver requests, and that legacy networks will be shut down as quickly a possible after enterprise networks (such as the NMCI) are established.

Its name is an analogue of the term "material condition Zebra," which is a standard configuration of equipment systems set on a warship to provide the greatest degree of subdivision and tightness to the ship. It is set immediately and automatically when general quarters is sounded.
