= Rupert Bottenberg =

Canadian illustrator, comic artist, editor

- Born: July 19, 1971 (age 55) Wolfville, Nova Scotia, Canada
- Area: Montreal
- Notable works: En Masse Lost Myths Traumstadtdenken

Rupert Bottenberg (born 19 July 1971 in Wolfville, Nova Scotia) is a Canadian illustrator, comic artist and writer.

Bottenberg grew up in Montreal. After graduation, and many freelance jobs, he established "Comix Jams, public events centered on collaborative, improvised comic art," a concept that was picked up by many other North American cities. His style of drawing has been called "clean-line" and full of "technical precision."

Bottenberg is currently the co-director of the En Masse collaborative art initiative, and co-creator, with writer Claude Lalumière, of the cryptomythological multimedia project Lost Myths. In 2012, Éditions TRIP released Bottenberg's first solo book, Traumstadtdenken, a collection of artworks, graphic literature and comics.
