= Fortean Society =

USA paranormal organization (1931-1959)

The Fortean Society was a New York City-based society started in the United States in 1931 during a meeting held in the home of American writer Charles Hoy Fort, in order to promote his ideas of Forteana.

Its first president was Theodore Dreiser, an old friend of Charles Fort, who had helped to get his work published. Founding members of the Fortean Society included Tiffany Thayer, Booth Tarkington, Ben Hecht, Alexander Woollcott, and many of New York's literati such as Dorothy Parker. Other members included Vincent Gaddis, Ivan T. Sanderson, A. Merritt, Frank Lloyd Wright, and Buckminster Fuller. But "Fort had his share of detractors; his friend H. L. Mencken said his head was filled with 'Bohemian mush'".

The first six issues of the Fortean Society's newsletter, Doubt, were each edited by a different member, starting with Theodore Dreiser. Tiffany Thayer thereafter took over editorship of subsequent issues. Thayer began to assert extreme control over the society, largely filling the newsletter with articles written by himself, and excommunicating the entire San Francisco chapter, reportedly their most active, after disagreements over the society's direction, and forbidding them to use the name Fortean. During World War II, for example, Thayer used every issue of Doubt to espouse his politics. He particularly opposed civil defense, going to such lengths as encouraging readers to turn on their lights in defiance to air raid sirens. In contrast to the spirit of Charles Fort, he not only dismissed flying saucers as nonsense, but also dismissed the atomic bomb as a hoax.

The Fortean Society Magazine (also called Doubt) was published regularly until Thayer's death in Nantucket, Massachusetts in 1959, when the society went on hiatus and the magazine came to an end. Writers Paul and Ron Willis, publishers of Anubis, acquired most of the original Fortean Society material and revived the Fortean Society as the International Fortean Organization (INFO) in 1961. INFO continues to this day and went on to incorporate in 1965, publish The INFO Journal: Science and the Unknown for over 35 years and created the first conference dedicated to the work and spirit of Charles Fort, the annual FortFest.

The original magazine Doubt and society were not connected to the present-day magazine Fortean Times, created by a British Fortean and long-time correspondent to Paul Willis, Bob Rickard, who encouraged Willis to publish. Much of the Fortean Society material including material from Fort, Dreiser and Hecht, excepting many of the notes of Charles Fort which were donated to the New York Public Library as a collection, was incorporated into the International Fortean Organization (INFO).
