= William Wallen =

William Wallen may refer to:

- William Wallén (born 1991), Swedish ice hockey forward
- William Wallen Sr. (1790–1873), English architect and surveyor in London
- William Wallen Jr. (1817–1891), English architect and surveyor in London
- William Wallen (architect, born 1807) (1807–1888), English architect who practiced in London and Huddersfield, Yorkshire

== See also ==
- Wallen (disambiguation)
