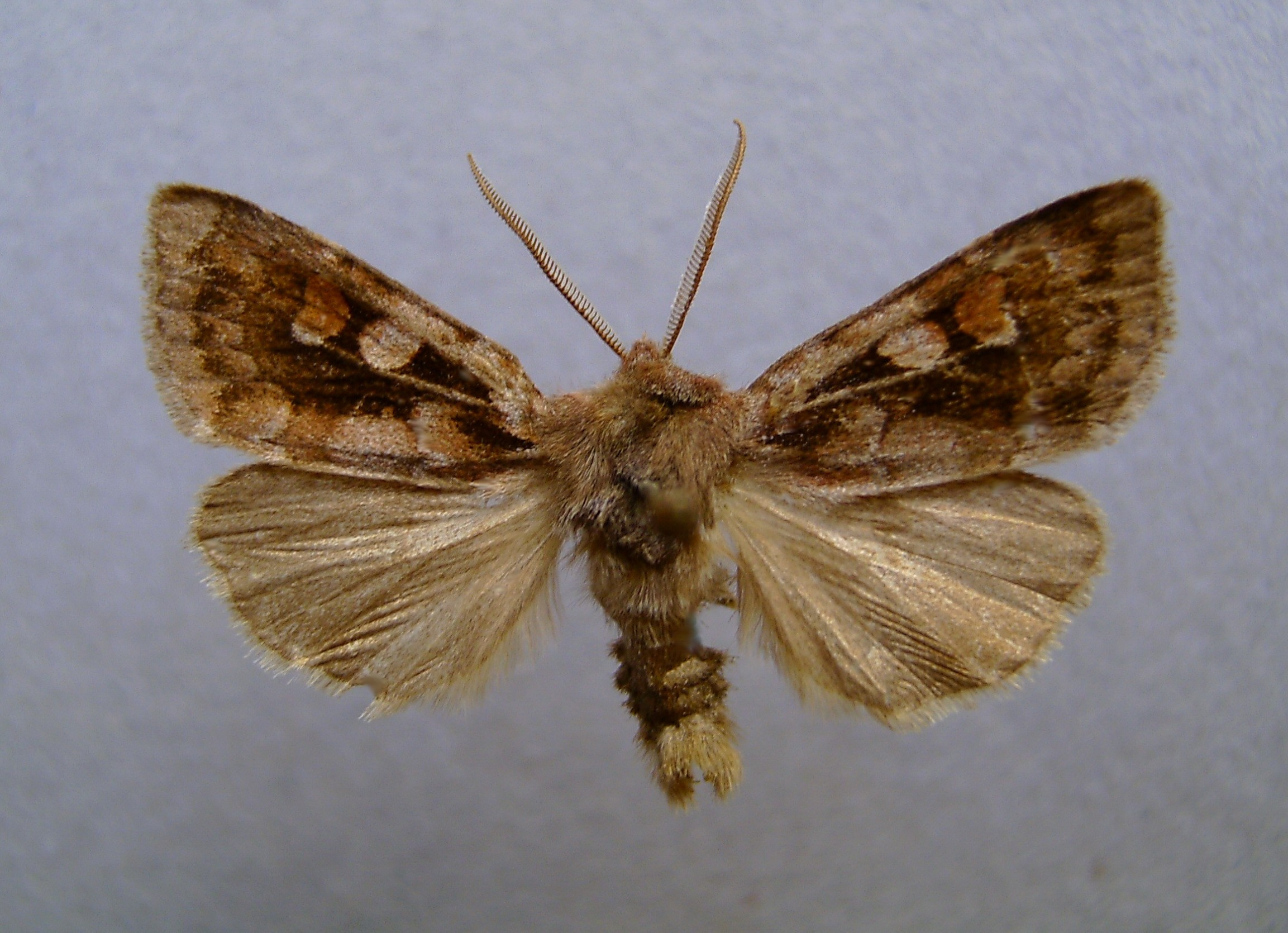

Scientific classification
- Kingdom: Animalia
- Phylum: Arthropoda
- Class: Insecta
- Order: Lepidoptera
- Superfamily: Noctuoidea
- Family: Noctuidae
- Genus: Xestia
- Species: X. alpicola

Binomial name
- Xestia alpicola (Humphreys & Westwood, 1843)

Synonyms
- Agrotis alpina Humphreys & Westwood, 1843; Agrotis carnica Hering, 1846; Agrotis iveni Hüber, 1870; Hadena alpicola Zetterstedt, 1839; Hadena aquilonaris Zetterstedt, 1839; Hadena hyperborea Zetterstedt, 1839; Orthosia glacialis Herrich-Schäffer, 1849; Xestia hyperborea Zetterstedt 1839

= Xestia alpicola =

Northern dart

Species of moth

Xestia alpicola, the northern dart, is a moth of the family Noctuidae. It is found from northern Europe across the Palearctic to central Siberia and in the Alps.

== Technical description and variation ==
The wingspan is 35–40 mm. Forewing grey shaded with fuscous, with only a slight reddish tint in the middle, the stigmata, which are large, and the lines, fairly distinct; hindwing fuscous with pale fringe; the female smaller than the male; — ab. hyperborea Zett. has the grey ground more varied with reddish and fuscous, the markings clearer; — in ab. aquilonaris Zett., grey clouded with brownish fuscous, the markings are blurred; all these greyer forms are from Lapland; — ab. alpina Humphr. & Westw., is buff grey varied with red, occurring in the North of Scotland and Ireland; — ab. coerulescens Tutt is the rich red-brown form with lilac-grey markings and blackish wedge-shaped streaks, found in the Shetland isles; — ab. carnica Hering is the rufous insect taken in the Carinthian Alps.

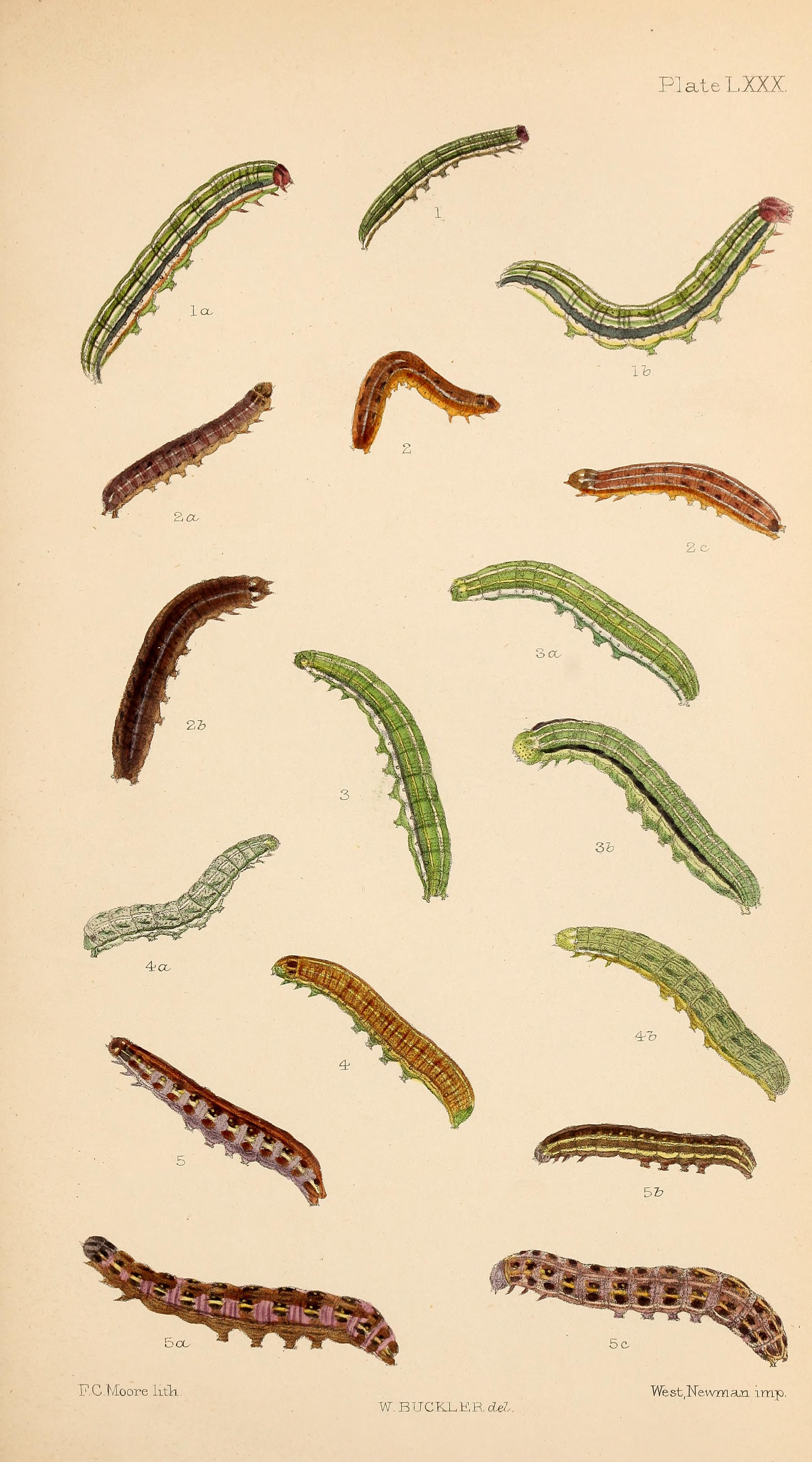
Figs. 2, 2a, 2b, 2c larvae in various stages

== Biology ==
Adults are on wing from June to August. It has a two-year life cycle, the larvae overwintering twice.

Larva brown-red; dorsum with dark striae forming a row of V-shaped marks; dorsal and subdorsal lines ochreous, partially black-edged; spiracular pale and obscure. The larvae mainly feed on Empetrum nigrum, but have also been recorded from other plants, including Calluna

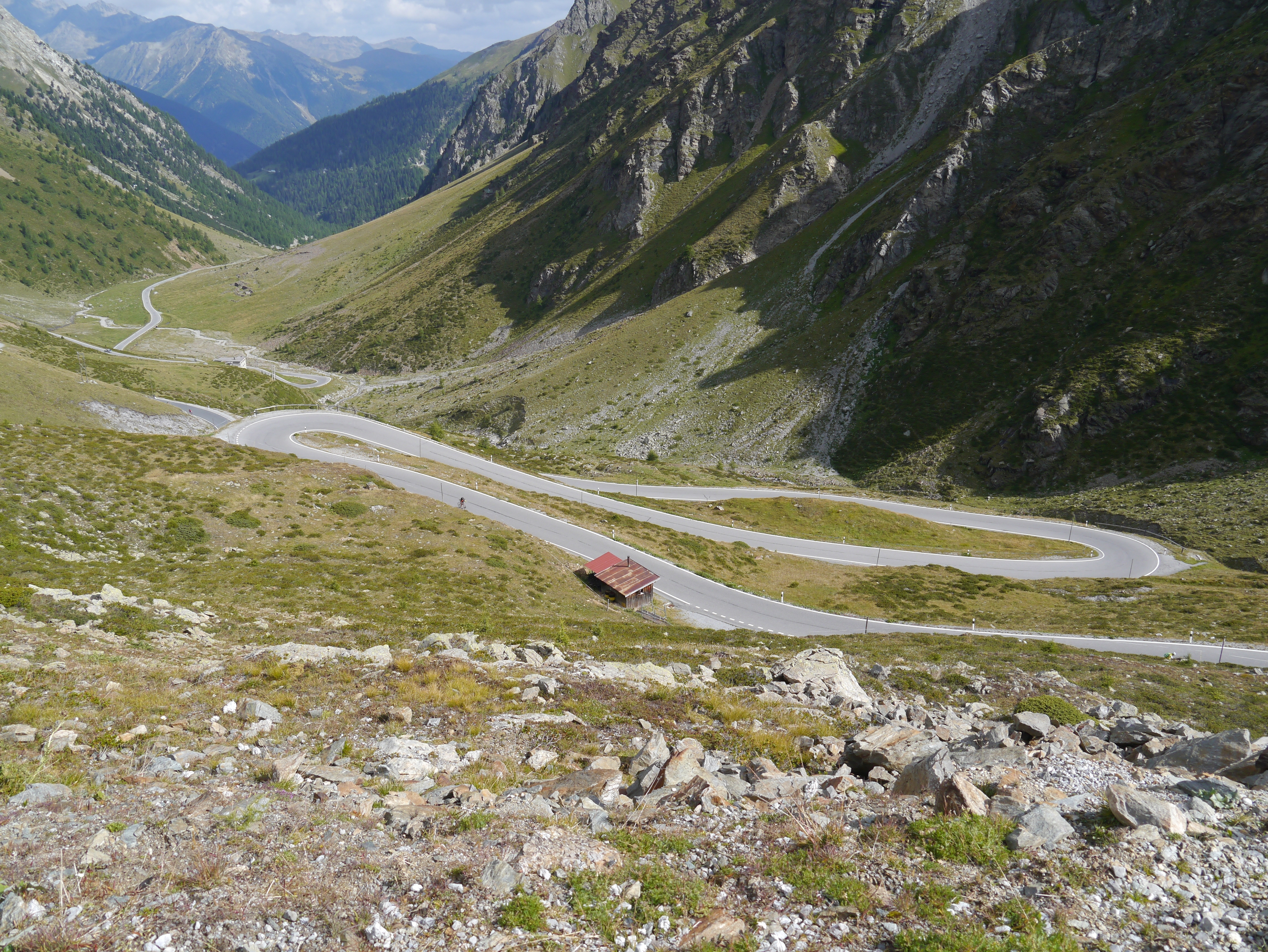
Habitat, Switzerland

== Subspecies ==
- Xestia alpicola alpicola (Zetterstedt, 1839) (northern Europe to central Siberia)
- Xestia alpicola alpina (northern British Isles)
- Xestia alpicola carnica (Hering, 1846) (Alps)
- Xestia alpicola ryffelensis (Oberthür, 1904) (Alps)
