= Mark Lane, London =

Street in the City of London

Coordinates: 51°30′37″N 0°4′50″W

Mark Lane
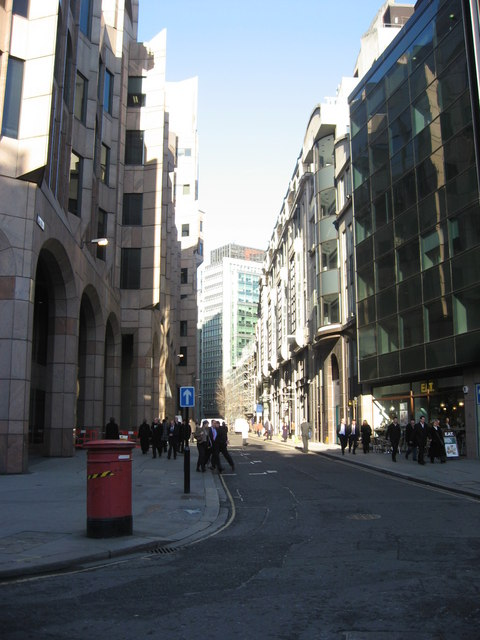
- Mark Lane in 2008, viewed from Great Tower Street
- Interactive map of Mark Lane
- Location: London, United Kingdom
- Postal code: EC3
- North end: Fenchurch Street
- South end: Great Tower Street

Mark Lane is a street in the City of London linking Great Tower Street and Fenchurch Street. It gave its name to the nearby Mark Lane tube station, which was opened in 1884, renamed Tower Hill in 1946, and closed in 1967. For some 240 years, Mark Lane was known for the corn exchange (which was the only market in London for corn, grain and seed); it occupied a series of properties on the east side of the southern end of the street.

== Description ==
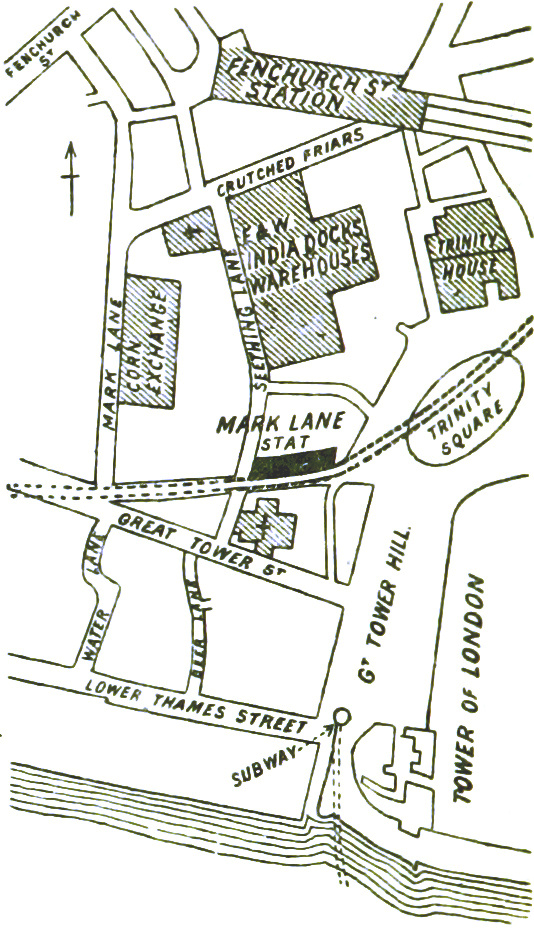
Mark Lane (left) with its nearby station, on an 1888 plan.

At its northern end, Mark Lane originates as a two-way side-road off Fenchurch Street, leading to Dunster Court, the home of the Worshipful Company of Clothworkers.

The street plays host to a number of offices and restaurants. The nearest London Underground station is Tower Hill (Circle and District lines) and the nearest mainline railway station is Fenchurch Street (with services towards east London and Essex).

Near the northern end of the lane stood the medieval Church of All Hallows Staining, which was demolished in 1870 when its parish was united with nearby St Olave's Church, Hart Street. Only the 12th or 13th century bell tower survives at the junction with Dunster Court. It is a Grade I listed building.

According to the antiquarian John Stow, writing at the end of the 16th century, the name of the lane is derived from a former cattle market or "mart" once held there.

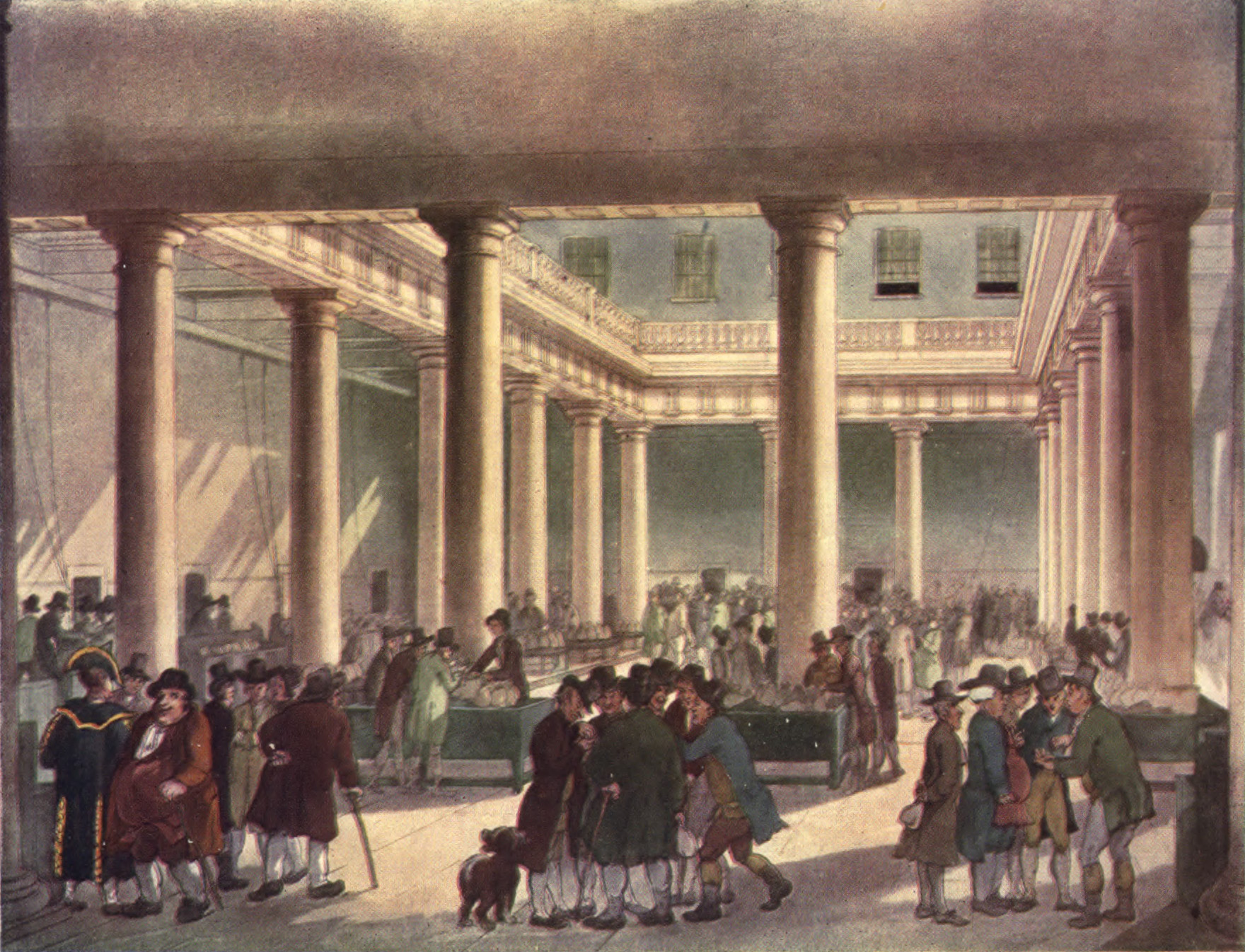
Corn Exchange, London, 1808.

In the nineteenth century 'Mark Lane' was a metonym for London's corn and grain markets. The original London Corn Exchange dated back to 1747. It was designed by George Dance the Elder in the neoclassical style, built around a courtyard which was open to the sky. In 1826 a rival exchange was set up by a group of discontented traders. Permission having been granted by Parliament, they established their new exchange, also in Mark Lane, immediately alongside the old; it was designed by George Smith in the Greek Revival style, and opened in 1828. In 1882, the Old Exchange was largely demolished and replaced by a far larger building, designed by Edward I'Anson in the Italianate style. Both exchanges continued in operation until they were amalgamated in 1926. Smith's New Exchange was demolished five years later; ten years after that, I'Anson's 1882 Corn Exchange was destroyed in the Blitz. Its replacement, by Terence Heysham, was opened in 1952. Twenty years later it too was demolished and rebuilt.

The Mark Lane Express, a weekly agricultural journal began publication in 1832. Later issues of the publication feature an engraving of the London Corn Exchange in its masthead, suggesting the journal may have been produced by the exchange, or someone, or group, associated with it.

A number of buildings in the lane were bombed and destroyed in the 1940s during the Blitz.

== In popular culture ==
Dornford Yates used Mark Lane as a setting for some of the action in his 1939 thriller, Gale Warning. It is the location of the fictitious "City Conservative Club".

== Notable people ==
- Thomas Boddington, slave-owner and philanthropist, who shared an office in Mark Lane with his brother Benjamin in the 18th century
- John Bristow, merchant and financier.
- John William Buckle, merchant and shipowner had an office at 33 Mark Lane in the first half of the 19th century.
- Alexander Ellice, Phyn, Ellice, Inglis principal, merchant, slave owner, who resided and established an office in Mark Lane.
- Mather & Co., merchants, contractors and shipowners had offices in Mark Lane in the late 18th and early 19th centuries.

== See also ==
- Corn exchanges in England
- Eastcheap
- Thames Street
