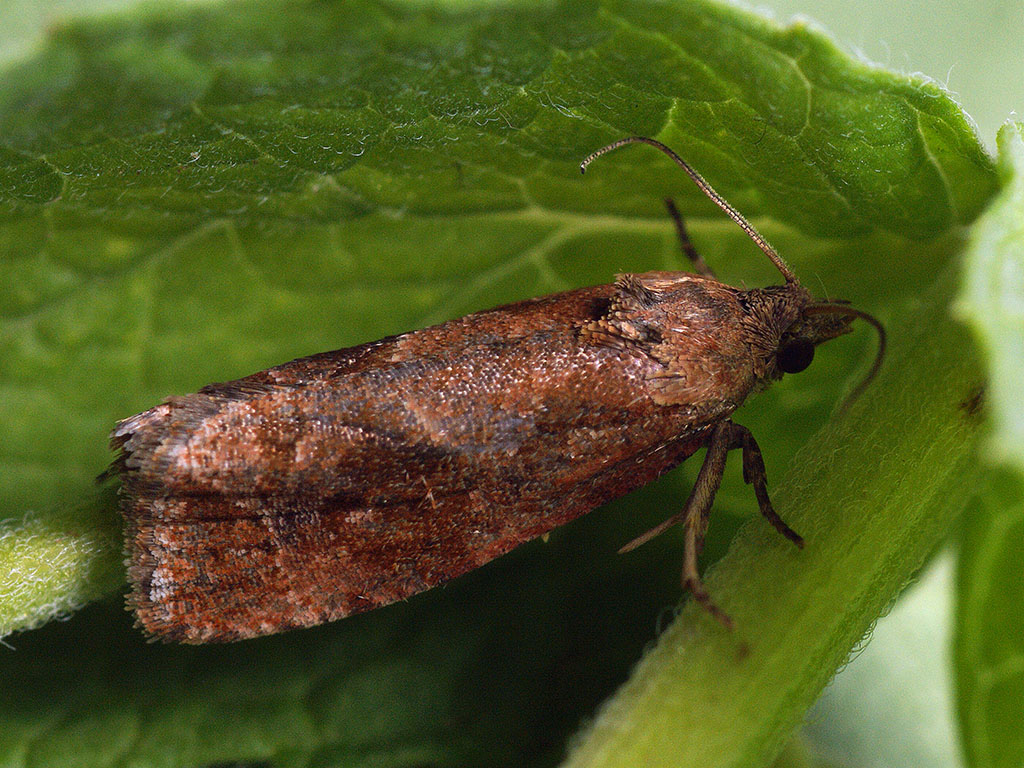
- Endothenia ericetana Moscow Oblast

Scientific classification
- Kingdom: Animalia
- Phylum: Arthropoda
- Class: Insecta
- Order: Lepidoptera
- Family: Tortricidae
- Genus: Endothenia
- Species: E. ericetana

Binomial name
- Endothenia ericetana (Humphreys & Westwood, 1845)

= Endothenia ericetana =

Species of moth

Endothenia ericetana is a species of moth, belonging to the family Tortricidae first described by Henry Noel Humphreys and John O. Westwood in 1845.

It is native to the Palearctic including Europe.

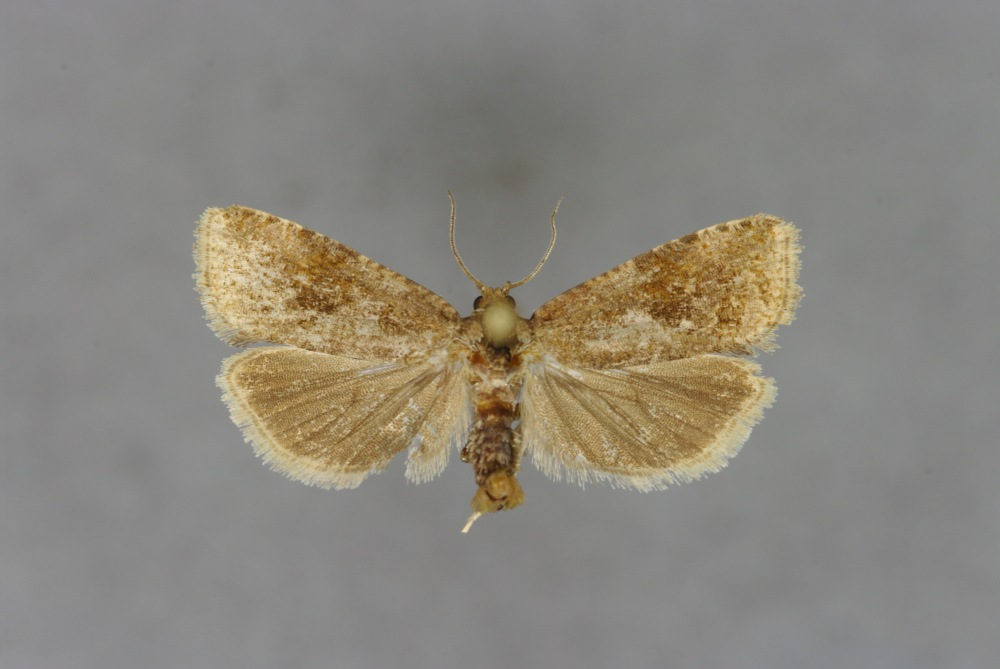
Set specimen Austria

The wingspan is 14–20 mm. The forewings are light fuscous, sometimes obscurely darker-strigulated . The base is obscurely darker or ferruginous-tinged. There is an indistinct central fascia not reaching the dorsum, a short transverse tornal streak, and a subapical streak not reaching costa All are darker fuscous or ochreous - brown and obscure. The hindwings are rather dark grey.

The species is found in connection with meadows, fields and farmland. The larvae feed in the stems and rootstock of woundwort Stachys and corn-mint Mentha arvensis. The moths fly in July–August.
