= Wallen =

Wallen or Wallén may refer to:

== People with the surname ==
=== Wallen ===
- Wallen (singer) (born 1978), French singer
- Ashley Wallen, Australian choreographer
- Byron Wallen (born 1969), British jazz trumpeter, composer and educator
- Catherine Wallen, American politician
- Dick Wallen (born c. 1936), American football player
- Errollyn Wallen (born 1958), Belize-born British composer
- Filippa Wallen (born 2000), Swedish footballer
- Gary Wallen (born 1955), English cricketer
- Harley Wallen, Swedish-American actor, writer and director
- John Wallen (1785–1865), British architect and surveyor
- Keith Wallen (born 1980), American singer, songwriter
- Morgan Wallen (born 1993), American country music singer and songwriter
- Norm Wallen (1918–1994), American Major League Baseball player
- R. T. Wallen (born 1942), American artist
- Romel V. Wallen (born 1980), Jamaican footballer
- William Wallen (disambiguation), a number of architects and/or surveyors carrying the name

=== Wallens ===
- Johan Wallens (born 1992), Colombian footballer
- Ronald Wallens (1916–1995), British Royal Air Force officer

=== Wallén ===
- Angelica Wallén (born 1986), Swedish handball player
- Ebbe Wallén (1917–2009), Swedish bobsledder
- Hans Wallén (born 1961), Swedish sailor
- Jan Wallén (born 1935), Swedish former sports shooter
- Martti Wallén (1948–2024), Finnish operatic bass singer
- Mona Wallén-Hjerpe sometimes called Sjösalakvinnan (1932-2008), Swedish author and criminal
- Peter Wallén (born 1965), Swedish ice hockey player
- Sigurd Wallén (1884–1947), Swedish actor, film director, and singer
- Ville Wallén (born 1976), Finnish footballer
- William Wallén (born 1991), Swedish ice hockey forward
- Zonja Wallen-Lawrence (1892–1986), Swedish-American biochemist, born Zonja Elizabeth Wallén

== People with the given name ==
- Wallen Mapondera (born 1985), Zimbabwean visual artist

== Places ==
- Wallen Slate Formation, a geologic formation in Germany
- Wallen Ridge (also called Wallens Ridge), a ridge in the U.S. states of Tennessee and Virginia

== See also ==
- De Wallen or De Walletjes, the largest and best known red-light district in Amsterdam, Netherlands
