= Owen Jones (architect) =

British architect (1809–1874)

- Born: 15 February 1809; City of London, England
- Died: 19 April 1874 (aged 65); Westminster, Middlesex, England
- Education: Royal Academy Schools
- Occupation: Architect
- Buildings: The Crystal Palace at Sydenham, 1854
- Projects: Great Exhibition, 1851

Owen Jones (15 February 1809 – 19 April 1874) was a British architect. A versatile architect and designer, he was also one of the most influential design theorists of the nineteenth century. He helped pioneer modern colour theory, and his theories on flat patterning and ornament still resonate with contemporary designers.

He rose to prominence with his studies of Islamic decoration at the Alhambra, and the associated publication of his drawings, which pioneered new standards in chromolithography. Through his association with Henry Cole, Jones advised on the foundation collections for what later became the Victoria and Albert Museum. Jones was also responsible for the interior decoration and layout of exhibits for the Great Exhibition building of 1851, and for its later incarnation at Sydenham. Jones formulated decorative arts principles which became teaching frameworks for the Government School of Design. These design propositions also formed the basis for his seminal publication, The Grammar of Ornament, the global and historical design sourcebook for which Jones is perhaps best known today.

Jones believed in the search for a modern style unique to the nineteenth century, radically different from the prevailing aesthetics of Neo-Classicism and the Gothic Revival. He looked towards the Islamic world for much of this inspiration, using his studies of Islamic decoration at the Alhambra to develop theories on flat patterning, geometry and abstraction in ornament.

== Family background ==
Jones was born on 15 February 1809 at 148 Thames Street, London the son of Owen Jones (1741–1814), a successful furrier and amateur Welsh antiquary, and his wife, Hannah Jane Jones (1772/3–1838). Being the Son of Owen Jones Snr. (bardic name of Owain Myfyr), a Welsh antiquary and the principal founder of the Gwyneddigion Society in London in 1770 for the encouragement of Welsh studies and literature, Jones Jnr. was born into a Welsh-speaking family at the heart of the Welsh cultural and academic societies in London.

== Early travel ==
Jones embarked on a Grand Tour to the continent in 1832, having completed studies at the Royal Academy Schools, an apprenticeship with the architect Lewis Vulliamy (1791–1871) and with Vulliamy's consent, employment by William Wallen snr, thus gaining experience as a surveyor. He travelled first to Italy and then to Greece where he met the young French architect Jules Goury (1803–1834), who was assisting Gottfried Semper (1803–1879) with his radical studies of the polychromy of Ancient Greek buildings. Jones and Goury travelled together to Egypt to study the Islamic architecture of Cairo and the ancient sites, and continued on to Constantinople before finally arriving at Granada in southern Spain where they embarked on their studies of the Islamic decoration at the Alhambra.

== The Alhambra ==
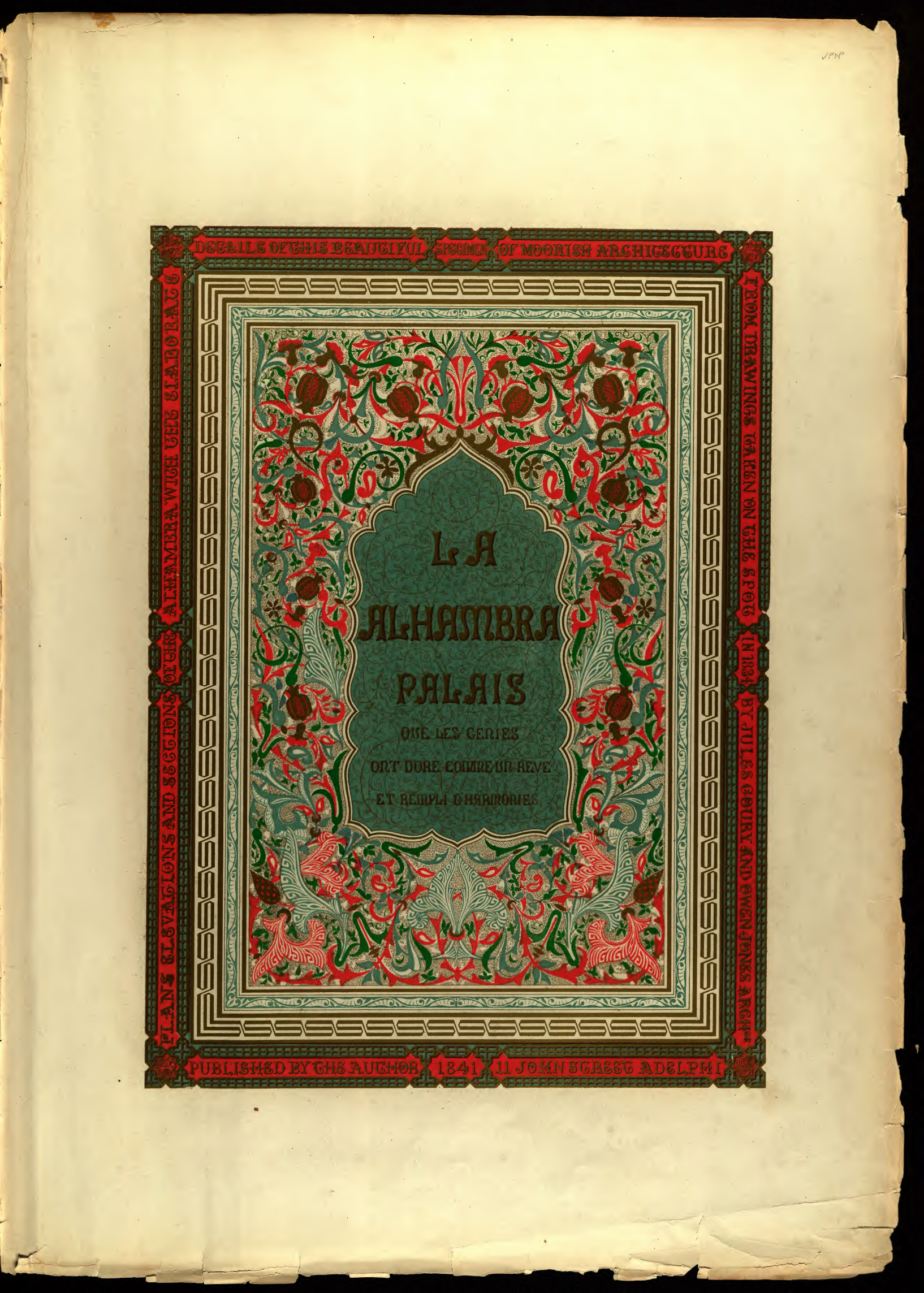
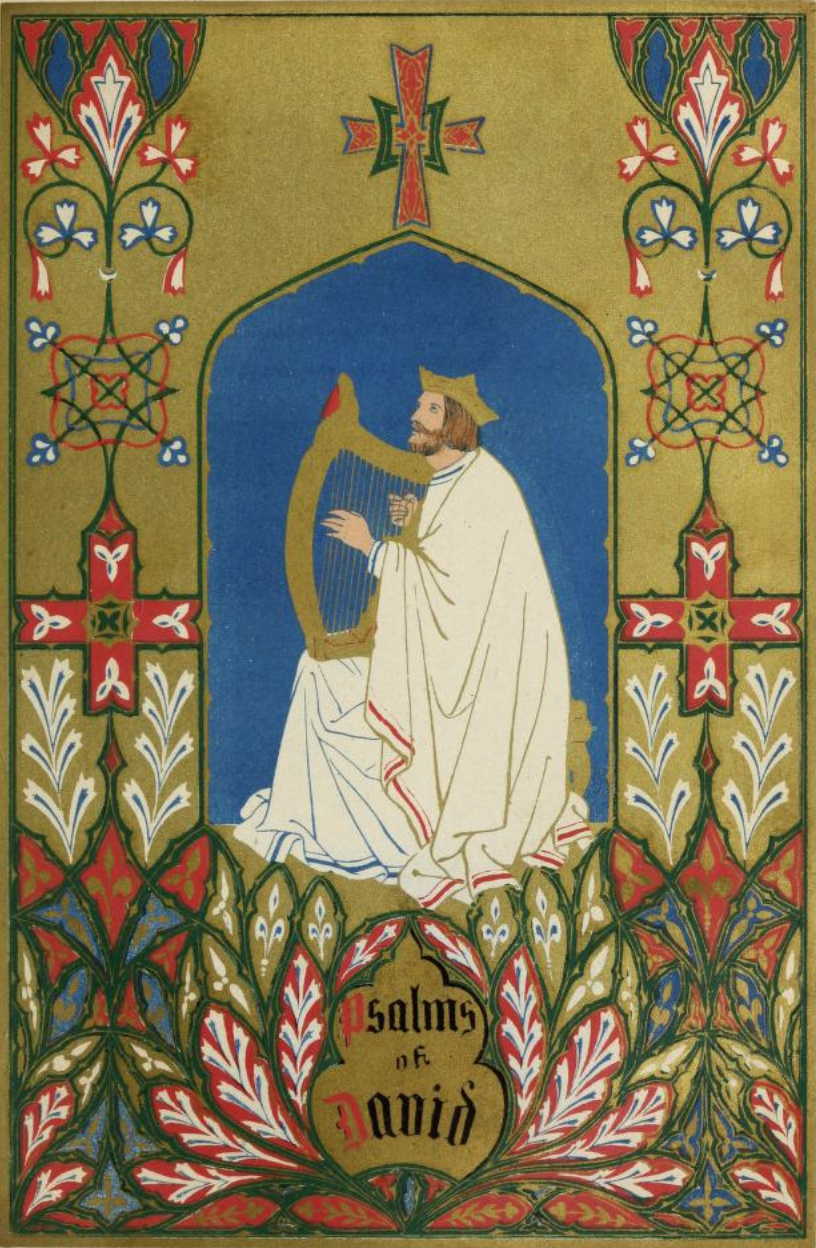
Left: drawing from La Alhambra palais; right: illustration from the 1845 illuminated Book of Common Prayer, showing aesthetic influence of the Alhambra.

Jones's studies of the Alhambra in Granada were pivotal in the development of his theories on flat pattern, geometry and polychromy. His travelling companion, Jules Goury, had recently been working with Gottfried Semper on his analysis of the polychromy of Ancient Greek buildings, and this was very likely a key factor in Jones embarking on such a scientific and detailed appraisal of the decoration at the Alhambra. Goury died of cholera – at the age of 31 – during their six-month stay at the Alhambra, and Jones returned to London determined to publish the results of their studies. The standard of colour printing at that time was not sophisticated enough to do justice to the intricate decoration of the Alhambra, therefore Jones undertook the printing work himself.

Collaborating with chemists and printers, Jones took it upon himself to research the new process of chromolithography. He subsequently issued Plans, Elevations, Sections and Details of the Alhambra, in twelve parts over a period of almost ten years, from 1836 to 1845. It was the world's first ever published work of any significance to employ chromolithography, and was to be a key milestone in the development of Owen Jones's reputation as a design theorist.

== Book designs and other printing projects ==
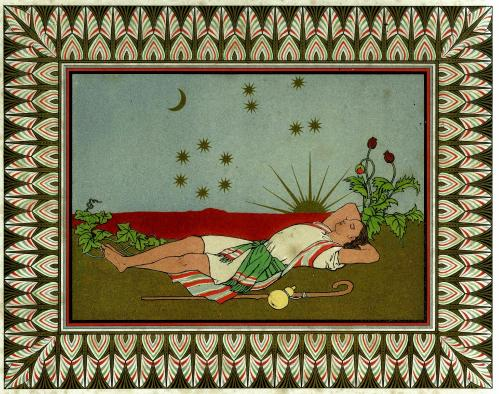
Joseph Dreams of Stars: page from The History of Joseph and His Brethren (1869), illustrated by Jones.

Printing Plans, Elevations, Sections and Details of the Alhambra had been a significant financial strain for Jones, but the publication had gained Jones a huge profile due to its pioneering standards of chromolithography. After, and possibly during, the long gestation period for Alhambra, Jones used his printing press to enter the lucrative market for illustrated and illuminated gift books which were becoming increasingly popular with the Victorian middle class.

Jones designed both secular and religious books (collaborating most notably with the publishers Day & Son and Longman & Co.) and developed innovative new binding techniques using materials such as embossed leather, papier-mâché and terracotta – all in an attempt to do justice to the luxurious contents, much of which could trace its aesthetic lineage back to sumptuous medieval illuminated manuscripts and religious bindings. Apart from these books, Jones's most significant (and most widely consumed) printing output was through his long-standing relationship with the firm of De La Rue. From the mid-1840s until the end of his life, some 30 years later, Jones designed a wide variety of products for De La Rue including playing cards, menus, biscuit-tin wrappers, postage stamps, chessboards, endpapers, scrap albums and diaries.

== The Great Exhibition ==
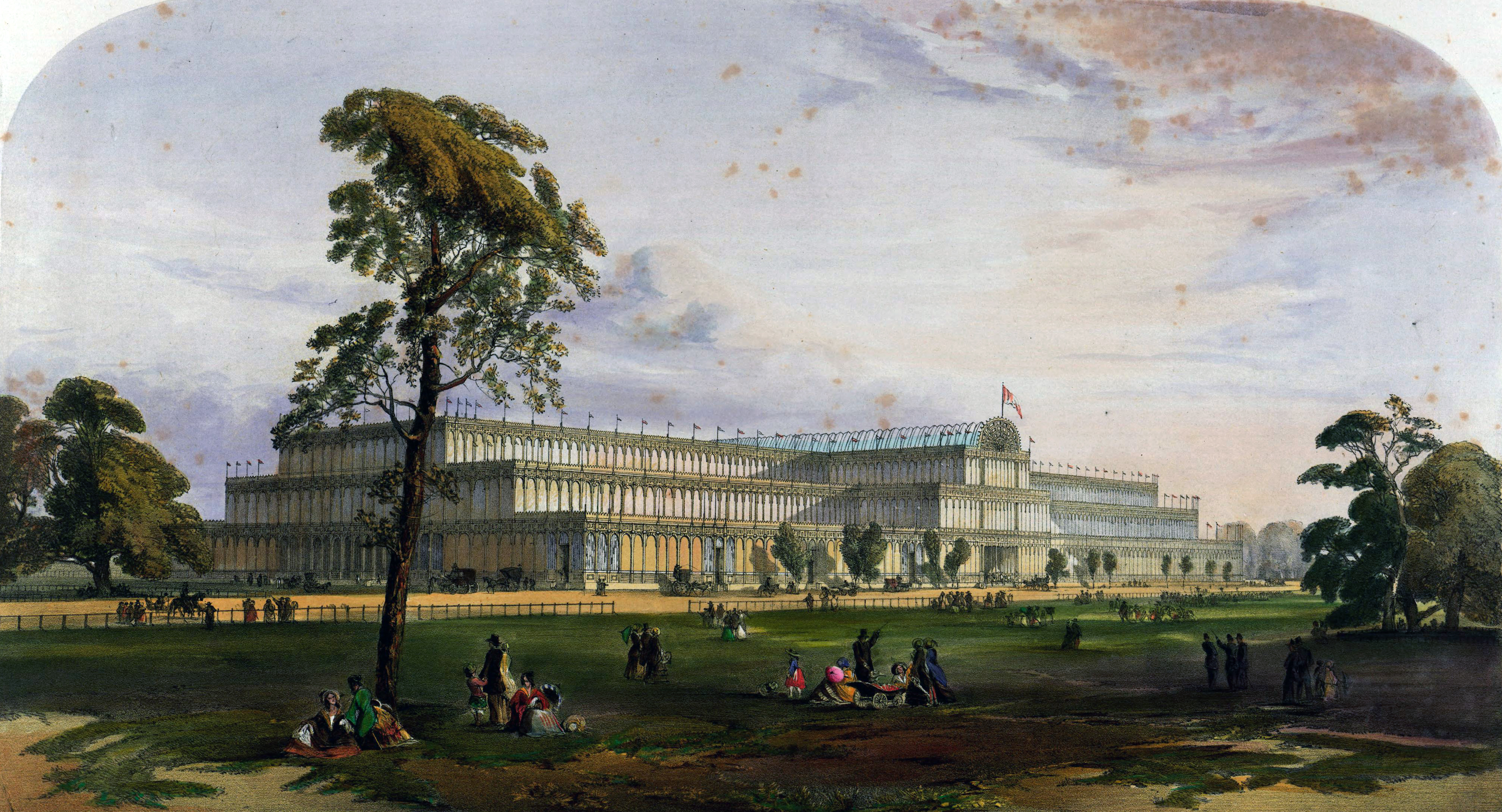
The Great Exhibition 1851

Jones was employed as one of the Superintendents of Works for the Great Exhibition of 1851. He was responsible for not only the decoration of Joseph Paxton's gigantic cast iron and glass palace, but also for the arrangement of the exhibits within, and this was the architectural project which first brought Jones to the wider public's attention.

Based on his observations of primary colour polychromy within the architecture of Ancient Egypt, Ancient Greece and at the Alhambra, he chose a simple palette of red, yellow and blue for the interior ironwork. Colour theories were relatively new, and his controversial paint scheme created much debate and negative publicity in the newspapers and journals of the day. Crucially, after early viewings, Prince Albert maintained his support, and Jones ploughed on regardless. The public and professional criticism gradually dissipated until the building was eventually unveiled by Queen Victoria to much critical acclaim – some commenting that Jones's colouring was similar in effect to the paintings of J. M. W. Turner. Jones had been offered a rare chance to put some of his theories on polychromy into practice on a grand scale: six million people witnessed his vision at the Great Exhibition during its short existence – roughly three times the population of London at that time.

== The Crystal Palace at Sydenham ==
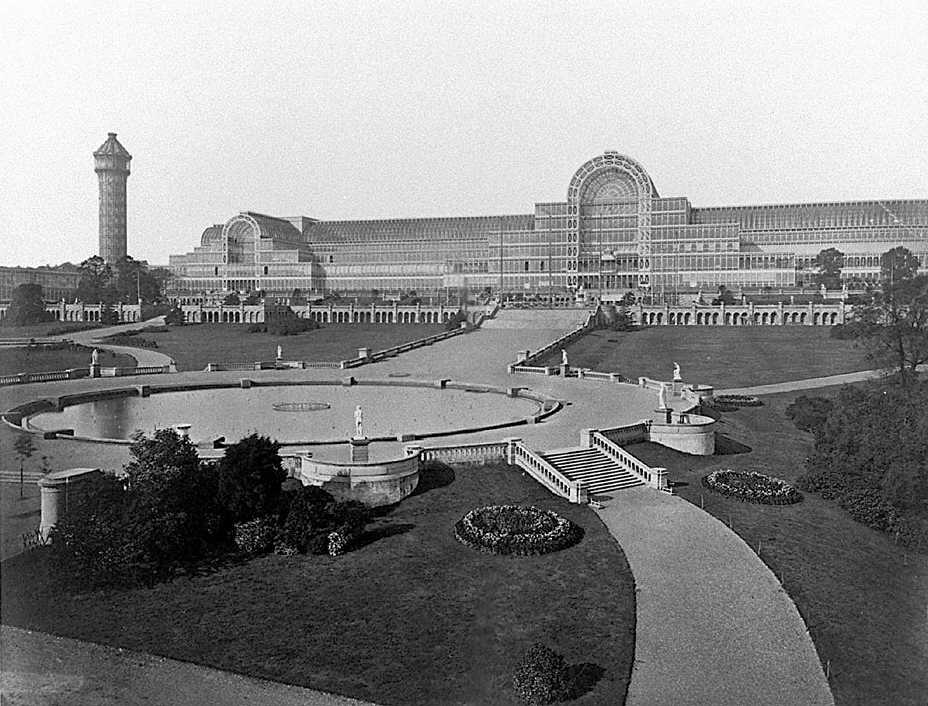
The Crystal Palace at Sydenham

After the Great Exhibition, "The Crystal Palace" was re-erected in Sydenham. Jones was given joint responsibility, with Matthew Digby Wyatt (1820–1877), for the decoration and layout for this new incarnation. It opened in 1854 as a permanent venue for education and entertainment.

Jones and Digby Wyatt envisaged a series of 'Fine Arts Courts' which would take the visitor through a grand narrative of the history of design and ornament. Jones had the opportunity to re-visit his work at the Alhambra by building a luxurious re-creation of the famed palace in the 'Alhambra Court'. He designed the Egyptian, Greek and Roman courts. For its first thirty years, the Crystal Palace at Sydenham welcomed approximately 2 million visitors a year. The Crystal Palace was destroyed by a fire in 1936, and was never rebuilt.

== The Grammar of Ornament ==
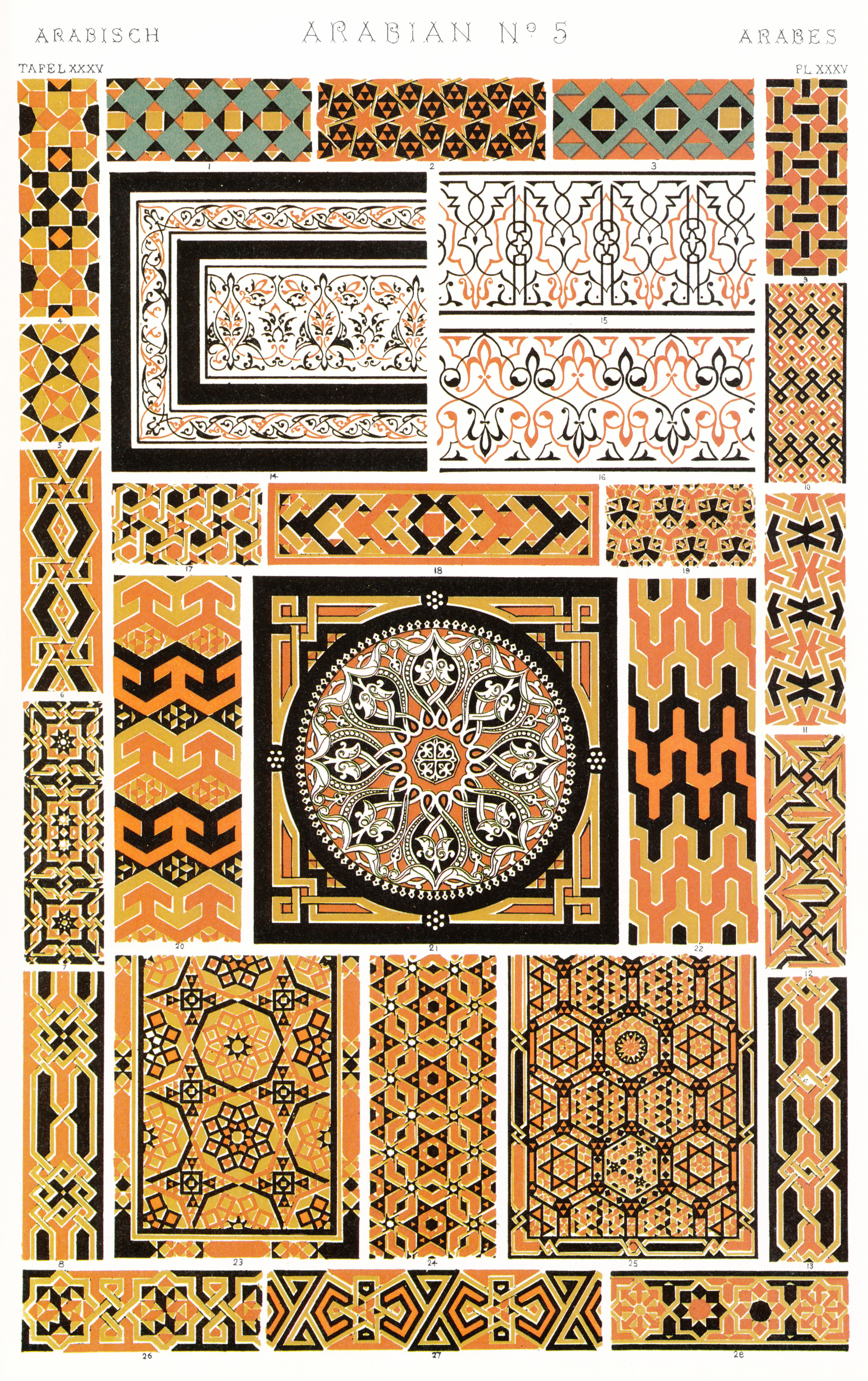
A plate from the Grammar

Through his work at the Great Exhibition, Jones developed a close working relationship with the civil servant Henry Cole (1808–1882) who went on to become the first director of the South Kensington Museum (later to become the V&A). Through his contact with Cole, Jones was able to present his theories on decoration, ornament and polychromy via a series of lectures at the Society of Arts and at the Government School of Design (latter the "Museum of Manufactures"), whose headmaster was the artist Richard Burchett, and which was administered by the newly formed Department of Practical Art at Marlborough House. Jones also advised on the formation of the teaching collections at Marlborough House (much of it acquired from exhibits at the Great Exhibition) which were collated together as the "Museum of Ornamental Art", and which later became the foundation collections for the South Kensington Museum.

Both Jones and Cole were concerned that these collections would encourage students to simply copy examples of ornament, rather than be inspired to examine the underlying decorative principles behind the objects. Furthermore, the location of the collections in London made it difficult for students at the provincial Schools of Design to gain access to them. These two factors would undoubtedly have been significant catalysts in motivating Jones to publish, in 1856, what is possibly his longest-lasting legacy: his seminal design sourcebook, The Grammar of Ornament.

Through his articles and lectures, Jones had been formulating what he considered to be key principles for the decorative arts, and indeed these principles provided the new educational framework for the Government School of Design at Marlborough House. Jones expanded his propositions to create 37 "general principles in the arrangement of form and colour in architecture and the decorative arts" which became the preface to the 20 chapters of The Grammar of Ornament.

The first 19 chapters of the Grammar present key examples of ornament from a number of sources which were diverse both historically and geographically – examining the Middle East in the chapters on Arabian, Turkish, Moresque (Alhambra) and Persian ornament. The final chapter, titled 'Leaves and Flowers from Nature' acknowledges the underlying principle that dictates the design of ornament around the world, which is the form found in nature: "in the best periods of art, all ornament was based upon an observation of the principles which regulate the arrangement of form in nature" and that "true art consists of idealising, and not copying, the forms of nature".

Christopher Dresser, Jones's best known protégé, contributed one of the plates in this final chapter, and he was concurrently presenting theories on natural-form ornament in his famous botanical lectures at the Government School of Design in the mid-1850s. This last chapter raises some critics about the inability to produce new ornamental design since repetition is a common factor among nature, and Jones describes this as "going back to nature like the ancients did" but his own response to this issue evolves around the fact that nature has a great variety of line and form, and is based in geometry which gives an enormous amount of freedom to the designer to follow and idealize the form of nature as a basic element while creating something that society has never seen before.

Jones gathered together all these samples of ornament as 'best' examples of decoration in an attempt to encourage designers to follow his lead in examining the underlying principles contained within the broad history of ornament and polychromy. The Grammar was influential in design schools in the latter half of the nineteenth century, and is still in print today.

== Decorative design ==
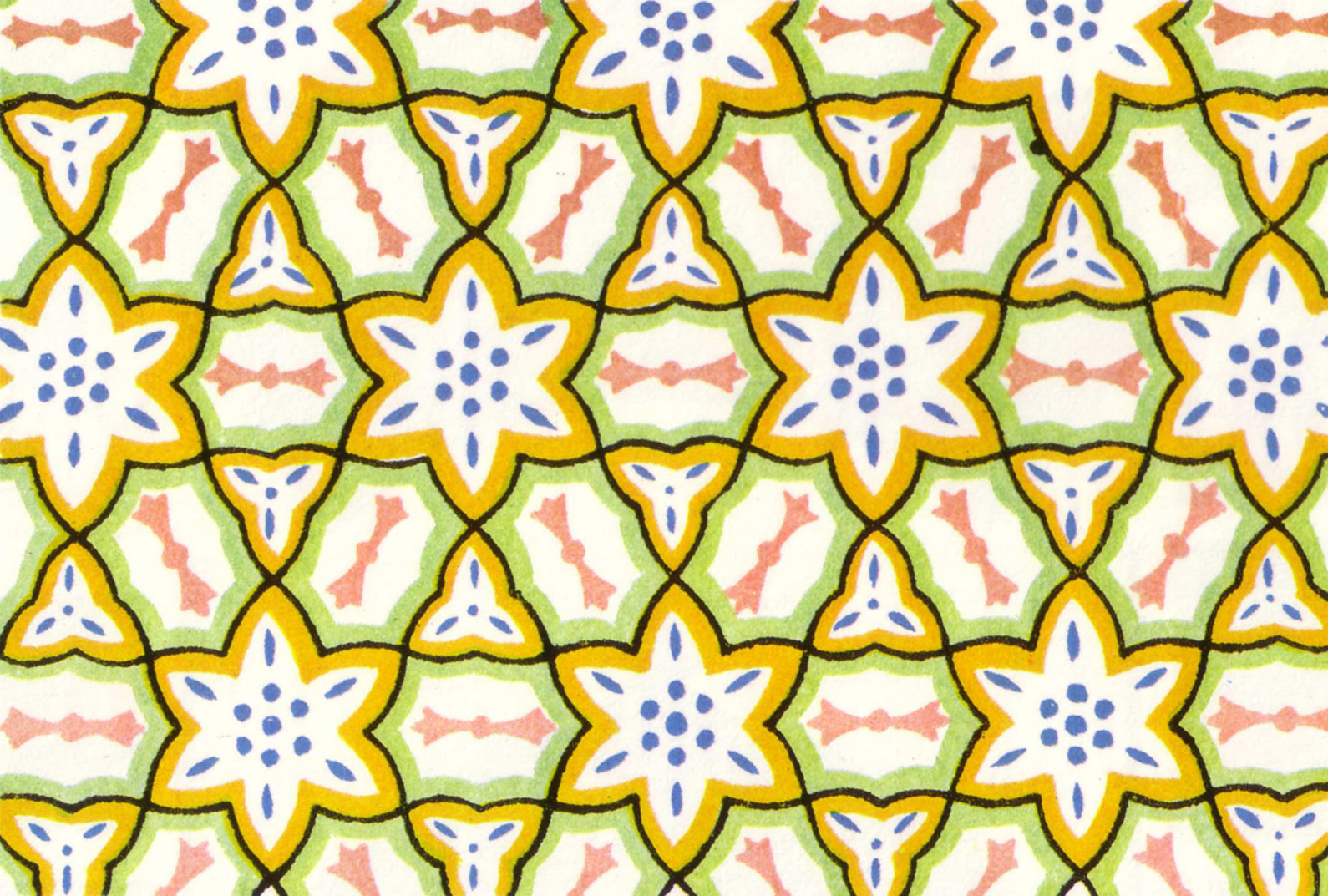
Illustration from The Grammar of Ornament (1856)

Jones was able to disseminate his theories on pattern and ornament through his work for several of the key manufacturers of the period, thus facilitating public consumption of his decorative visions in a number of diverse contexts. During the 1840s, having been inspired by the tilework at the Alhambra, Jones became known for his designs for mosaics and tessellated pavements, working for firms such as Maw & Co., Blashfield and Minton.

He designed wallpapers for several firms from the 1840s until the 1870s including Townsend and Parker, Trumble & Sons and Jeffrey & Co. Jones was also prolific in the field of textiles – designing silks for Warner, Sillett & Ramm and carpets for Brinton and James Templeton & Co. Jones also immersed himself in a number of decorative schemes for domestic interiors, most notably working in collaboration with the London firm Jackson & Graham to produce furniture and other fittings.

== Architectural projects and other commissions ==
Jones was well known for his work as an architect. Many of his built projects have been demolished or destroyed, including the Crystal Palace at Sydenham.

His most important building was St James's Hall between Piccadilly and Regent Street; for almost fifty years it was London's principal concert hall. He was also responsible for two grand shopping emporiums: the Crystal Palace Bazaar and a showroom for Osler's, the glassware manufacturer, both in the West End. These three buildings all opened within a few years of each other, between 1858 and 1860, but had all been demolished by 1926. Their sumptuous polychromed interiors of cast iron, plaster and stained glass were monuments to leisure and consumption.

One of the earliest examples of Jones's decoration as applied to architecture (and one of the few examples to exist today, albeit restored) was his work on Christ Church, Streatham, built in 1841 by James Wild (1814–1892), who became Jones's brother-in-law. Jones was responsible for the interior decoration, but would most probably have also contributed to the design of the exterior which exhibits brick polychromy and architectural details with Byzantine and Islamic influences. During the early 1860s, Jones was commissioned to design the South Kensington Museum's Indian Court and Chinese & Japanese Court, collectively known as the Oriental Courts. The V&A also holds design drawings by Jones for a speculative 'Alhambra' Court, which presumably would have housed exhibits of Islamic art – but this scheme was rejected in favour of his designs for the Chinese & Japanese Court. By the early twentieth century, the Oriental Courts were closed, but 1980s conservation work showed that much of Jones's decoration survives beneath the modern paintwork.

He designed two "Moresque" mansions on Kensington Palace Gardens, London's "millionaire's row", numbers 8 and 24. Number 8 was part of the London Cage in World War II, but is now demolished.

Also in the 1860s, Jones designed luxurious interiors for wealthy clients, in collaboration with firms such as Jackson & Graham (for furniture) and Jeffrey & Co. (for wallpapers.) For example, for the art collector Alfred Morrison, Jones designed the interiors for his country house at Fonthill (1863) and his London town house at 16 Carlton House Terrace (1867). He designed interiors for the palace of the Viceroy of Egypt, Ismail Pasha, in Cairo (1864), both using Arab and Moorish design principles.

== Bibliography ==
- Ashmore, S. Owen Jones and the V&A Collections (V&A Online Journal, Issue 1, 2008)
- Aslet, Clive; Powers, Alan (1985). The National Trust book of the English house. Harmondsworth: Penguin / Viking / The National Trust. ISBN 0-670-80175-5. OCLC 12037000.
- Braga, Ariane Varela (2016). "Owen Jones and the Oriental Perspective". In Giese, Francine; Braga, Ariane Varela (eds.). The Myth of the Orient: Architecture and Ornament in the Age of Orientalism. Peter Lang. pp. 147–162. ISBN 978-3-0343-2107-5.
- Clouse, Doug (2009). The Handy Book of Artistic Printing: Collection of Letterpress Examples with Specimens of Type, Ornament, Corner Fills, Borders, Twisters, Wrinklers, and other Freaks of Fancy. Princeton Architectural Press.
- Crinson, M. Empire Building: Orientalism and Victorian Architecture (Routledge, 1996)
- Darby, M. The Islamic Perspective: An Aspect of British Architecture and Design in the 19th Century (exhibition catalogue, World of Islam Festival Trust, 1983)
- Darby, M. Owen Jones and the Eastern Ideal (unpublished Ph.D. thesis, University of Reading, 1974)
- Edwards, Clive (2011). Interior Design: A Critical Introduction. Berg Publishers.
- Ferry, K. R. Awakening a Higher Ambition: The Influence of Travel upon the Early Career of Owen Jones (unpublished Ph.D. thesis, University of Cambridge, 2004)
- Ferry, K. R. Printing the Alhambra (Architectural History, vol. 46, 2003)
- Flores, Carol A. Hrvol (1996). Owen Jones, Architect (Thesis). Atlanta: Georgia Institute of Technology.
- Flores, Carol A. Hrvol (2006). Owen Jones: Design, Ornament, Architecture & Theory in an Age of Transition. Rizzoli.
- Horsfall Turner, Olivia (2023). Owen Jones and the V&A. Lund Humphries.
- Jespersen, J. K. Originality and Jones's The Grammar of Ornament of 1856 (Journal of Design History, vol. 21, no. 2, 2008)
- Jones, Owen (1856). The grammar of ornament. London: Published by Day and Son, Lithographers to the Queen, Gate Street, Lincoln's Inn Fields. OCLC 2111842.
- Moser, Stephanie. Designing Antiquity: Owen Jones, Ancient Egypt and the Crystal Palace (Yale University Press, 2012).
- Papier (n.d.). "A Journey in Pattern & Colour: The Grand Tour of Owen Jones". The Fold. Papier.
- Sloboda, S. The Grammar of Ornament : Cosmopolitanism and Reform in British Design (Journal of Design History, vol. 21, no. 3, 2008)
- Smith, Nicholas (20 January 2014). "What's in a name?". Victoria and Albert Museum.
