= Edward Jones (Welsh architect) =

Welsh architect and surveyor (1796–1835)

Edward Jones (1796–1835) was a Welsh-born architect and surveyor. He was a pupil of John Wallen, Architect and Principal Surveyor to London. Jones was influenced by Greek Revival Architecture.

== Biography ==
Edward Jones was born in February 1796 in Wrexham, Denbighshire, Wales, the youngest son of John and Ann Jones. John Jones was a Wrexham carpenter who built Linen Hall, also known as Jones' Hall, in Queen Street, Wrexham. By 1815, John and Anne also owned properties in Pentrefelin and in the townships of Broughton and Brombo.

On 1 March 1823, Edward married Sophia Edwards (1801–1880) at St Lukes, Deptford. Their marriage was witnessed by Harriet and Maria Wallen. Edward and Sophia had four children, all born in Wrexham:

- Edward George Jones (1828–1873)
- Sophia Elizabeth Jones (1829–1922)
- Harriet Jones (1830–1832)
- William Jones (1832–1832)

In 1834, Edward Jones was a trustee of the Presbyterian Chapel, Chester Street, Wrexham. On 1 May 1835, Edward died aged 39, at his home next to Linen Hall, Queen Street, Wrexham. He was buried on 8 May 1835 by Rev. John Pearce in the Dissenters' Burial Ground, Rhosddu Road, Wrexham

Edward Jones, (1834). Design for an Athenian Villa. Yale Center for British Art.

== Career ==
In about 1813, Edward became a pupil of architect and surveyor, John Wallen . During his tutelage in Wallen's office he would have encountered a diverse range of architectural projects including Wallen's innovative, steel-framed, commercial designs. During 1818, he undertook the ‘Grand Tour’ of Greece and Italy, thus complementing his architectural education.

It can be assumed that he had returned to John Wallen's office at 10 White Lion Street, Pentonville, by 1819, because this information is attached to Edward's first recorded exhibition at the Royal Academy. Wallen is known to have introduced another pupil, William Beatson, to the Royal Academy; therefore, it is probable that Edward was also an academy student and exposed to Ancient Greek architecture by the academy's professor of architecture, Sir John Soane.

During 1823, Edward was practicing at 21–20 Providence Row, Finsbury Square, London and he is assumed to be the ‘Mr Jones’ who made a design for the North front and wings of Broomhall, Fife, the seat of Thomas Bruce, the 7th Earl of Elgin. His design was never executed due to Elgin's financial embarrassment largely due to the cost of acquiring and shipping the Parthenon Marbles.

By 1826, Edward had moved to 24 Charles Street, Bedford Square and was also listed as Architect and Surveyor, Queen Street, Wrexham In 1830, he designed an ornamental temple, based on the Temple on the Ilissus, for Mrs. Powis of Berwick Hall on the Severn. By 1834, his practice had moved to 67 Great Russell Street, Bedford Square, London.

== Publications ==
Grecian Revival Architecture was originally led by Robert Smirke and William Wilkins, however, by 1820, opposition to this architectural genre was being expressed in the periodicals and defenders of Classic and Gothic styles were initiating the Battle of Styles as it would be known during the Victorian period. Nevertheless, the Greek Revival continued to spread throughout Britain, in part, because young London-based architects built in the provinces.

In 1835, Edward published a folio with plates, Athenian or Grecian Villas: Being a Series of Original Designs for Villas or Country Residences to exemplify in effect its applicability to Domestic Edifices of this country, and its adaption in Plan to the modern arrangement of their usual arrangements. Price 15 shillings. Edward dedicated his work, by permission, to Sir Robert Smirke. He relied upon the “pleasing description” of temples and villas given by the earliest authors and also studies by the highly regarded author and topographer of Greece, Colonel Leake. Edward noted the discovery of several bas-reliefs depicting Grecian villas, finding they embodied the same qualities as Greek public edifices. Edward's 1835 designs allowed for the addition of similar sculpture, bronze statues and other art that “were invariably adjuncts to the tasteful and elegant buildings of the Greeks”. The estimated cost of construction was attached to each design.

In November 1835, John Claudius Loudon’s Architectural Magazine attacked Edward’s publication. In a highly critical review, Loudon suggested that Edward’s plans not only displayed the mediocrity of Grecian architecture but also violated architectural principle by marking stone sizes on masonry walls. Loudon deemed this to be an aesthetic “sin” committed by the builders of Whitehall, Somerset House and “almost every portico of the street houses of London”. The review ignored Edward's research, instead asserting that Grecian architectural simplicity, which embodies straight horizontal and vertical geometry, is inherently inferior in resources to Gothic and Roman architecture. Loudon invited Edward's reply, apparently unaware that Edward had already died.

== Art Work ==
Edward was an exhibitor at The Royal Academy of Arts, Liverpool Academy of Arts and The Society of British Artists in Suffolk Street. Work by Edward Jones displayed at the Royal Academy of Arts, London.

- 1819. North-west view of the Tower of Wrexham Church, North Wales.
- 1826. Temple of Jupiter Olympius at Athens, as it might have appeared shortly posterior to the time of Hadrian. The spectator supposed to be placed above the walls of the city, etc.
- 1831. Design for an ornamental temple, based on the Temple on the Ilissus,
- 1835. Design for an Athenian cottage.

Work by Edward Jones, now held by Yale Center for British Art, New Haven, USA.

- 1818 Ruins at Chiaravalle near Ancona, Italy
- 1834 Design for an Athenian Villa. Front Elevation
- 1834 Design for an Athenian Villa. Side Elevation
- 1834 Design for an Athenian Villa. Transverse Section
- Undated Design for an Athenian Villa.
- 1834 Design for an Athenian Villa. Perspective View showing the principal and garden fronts.
