= Francis Hodgson Nixon =

Francis Hodgson Nixon (c. 1832 – 5 November 1883) was an Australian architect, newspaper owner, and the grandfather of playwright Mona Brand. He sometimes wrote under the pseudonym of Peter Perfume.

== Early life and education ==
Francis Hodgson Nixon was the son of a Royal Navy captain and received a liberal education in England.

== Career ==
In 1846, Nixon became a pupil of the London-based architect and surveyor William Wallen Jr. In 1852, Nixon immigrated to Victoria where he was engaged as an architect, reportedly "having duly accredited certificates, in superintending the erection of government buildings in the Ovens–Beechworth district". Although Nixon advertised as: "Architect and Surveyor, Articled pupil of Mr. William Wallen Jnr., London and Greenwich", his indenture agreement had been annulled, by mutual consent, on 22 June 1849.

When the population had settled, he started and briefly edited the Ovens and Murray Advertiser. He then acted as secretary to the Bendigo waterworks and subsequently edited the Hamilton Spectator and Wagga Wagga Advertiser. He was at one time associated with the well known Mr. G. C. Levey in the conduct of the Melbourne Morning Herald. About 1879, he moved to Rockhampton, Queensland and joined the Daily Northern Argus, eventually assuming the role of proprietor before selling the paper to a local solicitor, Mr Lyons. He ended his career in architecture in 1881, possibly due to stress gained from overworking.

== Personality and writing style ==
Nixon was reputed by his peers to have had an excellent memory, strong intelligence and enthusiasm, and profound taste in literary culture, being well experienced in literature and politics despite not undergoing training in journalism. His style of composition and the manner in which he reproduced the thoughts and words of speakers was described as easy and graceful. Despite differences of opinion with others, he was able to avoid personal antagonism with his acquaintances. He was earnest in his advocacy of any cause which he took up, and in his long connection with the press exercised considerable influence on the communities in which he worked.

== Death ==
Nixon committed suicide on 5 November 1883 at about 4:00 p.m. via a gunshot wound to the head. He suffered from insomnia produced from overwork in his profession as a journalist, believed to have been the reason he took his own life. Earlier that afternoon, after transacting business in Rockhampton, he hired a cab and drove to the vicinity of Mr. W. Pattison near Alligator Creek, instructing the cabman to wait on the Rockhampton side of the bridge across the creek. Shortly after, a man on the bridge heard a shot fired and informed manager Mr. J. Hyland to report to the site of the sound. Not long after, the party found Nixon lying against a tree holding a Colt's Derringer with a gunshot wound through the temple. Nixon was believed to have died about five minutes after Hyland's party reached him.

Nixon's remains were transported to his residence in Quay Street, leaving a widow and ten children. The funeral of Nixon took place on 6 November 1884, and was attended by his friends and a number of principal citizens, who testified to the respect they had for him by following his coffin to the South Rockhampton cemetery.
