= St Michael and All Angels, Blackheath =

Coordinates: 51.4648°N 0.0137°E

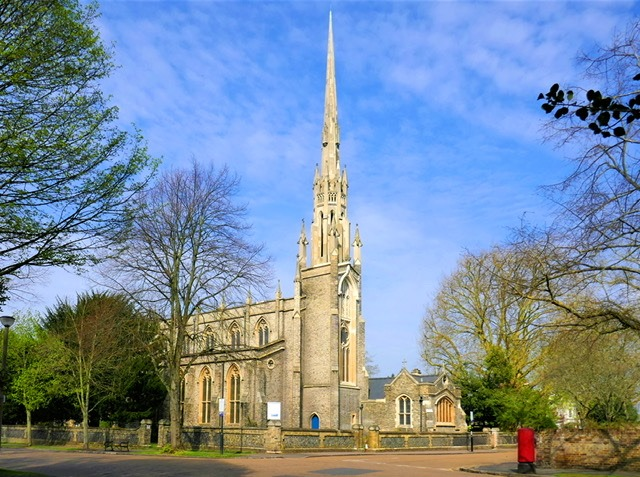
- St Michael and All Angels, Blackheath
- St Michael and All Angels, Blackheath
- OS grid reference: TQ 39969 75896
- Location: London, SE3
- Country: England
- Denomination: Church of England
- Website: Church website

History
- Founded: 1830
- Dedicated: 1874; 152 years ago

Architecture
- Heritage designation: Grade II*
- Architect: George Smith
- Style: Gothic

Administration
- Diocese: Southwark
- Archdeaconry: Lewisham and Greenwich
- Deanery: Charlton

Clergy
- Vicar: Rev Trevor Kemp

St Michael and All Angels, Blackheath is an Anglican parish church in Blackheath, London. The church is a part of the Diocese of Southwark. This Grade II* listed building was designed by the architect George Smith.

== History ==
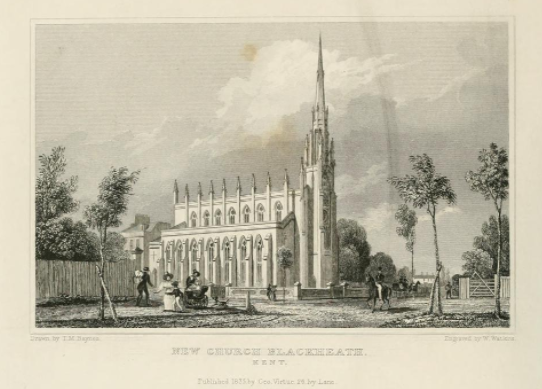
New Church in Blackheath 1830 – Drawing by Thomas Mann Baynes

St Michael and All Angels is located in the Cator Estate in Blackheath. The estate was purchased by John Cator in 1783. The area purchased included the Wricklemarsh mansion along with its 250-acre estate, previously owned by Sir Gregory Page. Following Cator's death in 1806, the estate was inherited by his nephew John Barwell Cator (1791–1850). As there was no church close to the residents of the estate, Cator provided a portion of land and £4,000 towards the construction of the church.

The foundations were laid on 20 December 1828 and the building was completed in February 1830. The architect was George Smith and the builder was William Moore, a local bricklayer and carpenter.

The chapel was consecrated as the parish church of St Michael and All Angels in 1874. Until then, the church had been called either Trinity or St Peter’s Chapel or simply ‘Mr Cator’s chapel'.

During the Second World War, when Frank Colquhoun was vicar, the church was heavily affected by air raids.

=== Architecture ===
The church was designed in a Gothic style unusual for the 1830s. The building has a distinctive, tall 172 ft (52 m) high spire, which is known as "the Needle of Kent". The steeple is placed unusually at the east end of the building. The location is thought to have been intended to attract attention as seen from the crossroads of the estate. The building is made of white Gault bricks with Bath stone dressings and roofed with Welsh slate. Ian Nairn describes it as "far more individual than the usual run", and "more than a studious crib from a pattern book", and notes "the highly successful Eastern Tower".

The stone pulpit was erected in 1920 as a World War I memorial.
