= Corn Exchange, London =

Commercial building in London, England

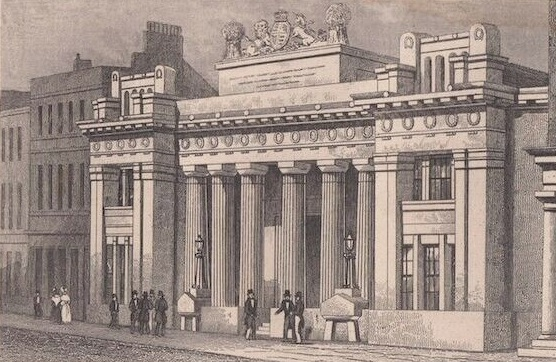
- The new Corn Exchange, completed in 1828

- Shown in Central London
- 51.5103°N 0.0801°W
- Location: Mark Lane, London

History
- Built: 1828

Site notes
- Architect: George Smith
- Architectural style: Greek Revival style

The Corn Exchange was a commercial building in Mark Lane, London, England. The original structure dated from 1747, but the exchange later amalgamated with a rival exchange and was rebuilt several times before finally closing in 1987.

== History ==
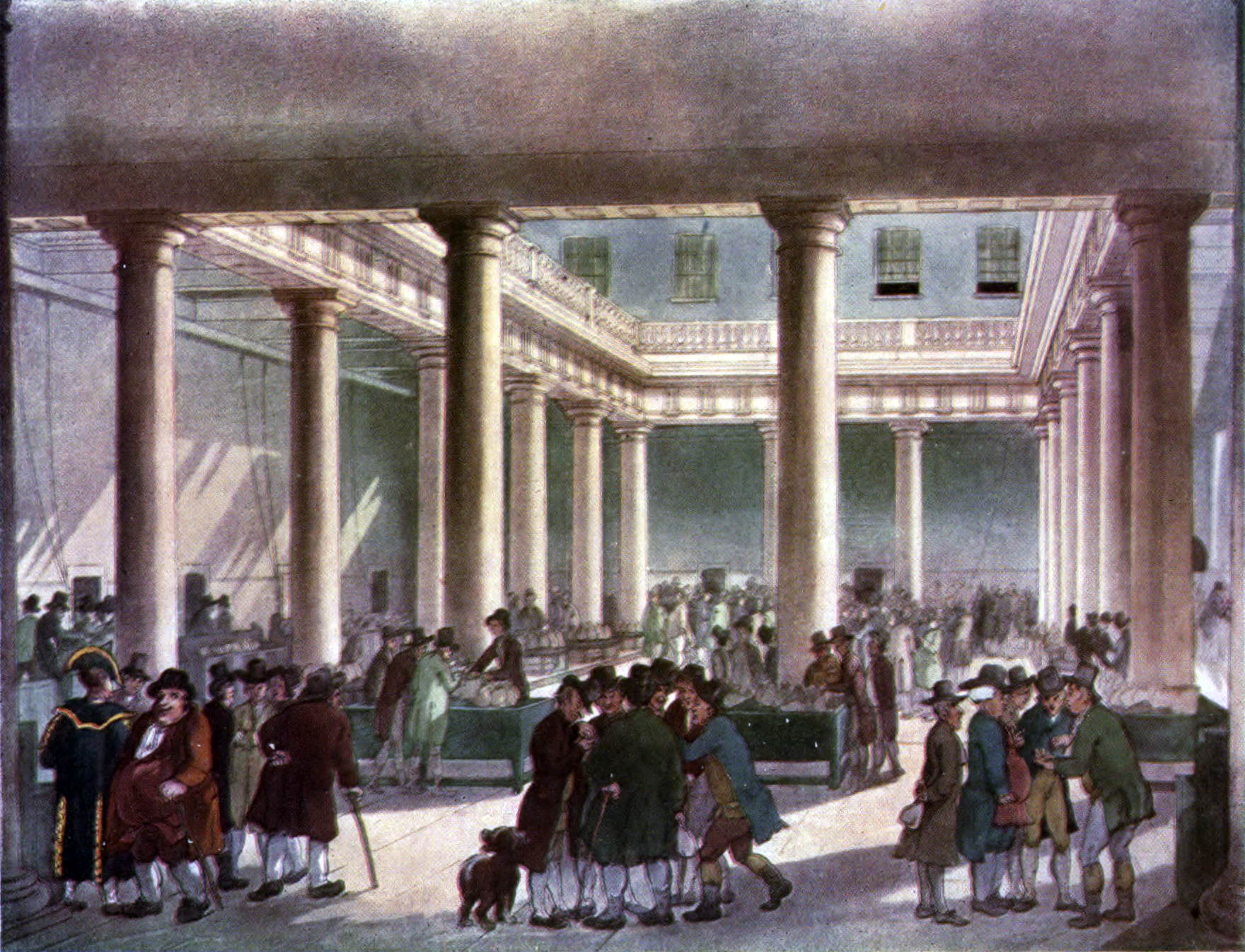
The interior of the old Corn Exchange, London, 1808.

In the mid-18th century corn merchants sought a location to trade their corn, which was brought by river into the city, and customarily landed at Bear Quay.

The first corn exchange, known simply as the Corn Exchange, was designed by George Dance the Elder in the neoclassical style, built in ashlar stone and was completed on the east side of Mark Lane in 1747. It brought together the various agents who sold oats, beans and all kinds of grain on behalf of the farmers and was built around a courtyard which was open to the sky. The courtyard was surrounded by stalls or counters at which samples of the goods being traded were available. Either side of the corn exchange were coffee-houses, where further business was transacted.

London Corn Exchange Act 1826
- Act of Parliament
- Parliament of the United Kingdom
- Long title: An Act for erecting and providing a New Corn Exchange at or near Mark Lane in the City of London.
- Citation: 7 Geo. 4. c. lv

Dates
- Royal assent: 5 May 1826

Other legislation
- Repealed by: Corn Exchange Act 1929

Status: Repealed

Corn Exchange Act 1872
- Act of Parliament
- Parliament of the United Kingdom
- Long title: An Act for incorporating and conferring powers on the Proprietors of the Corn Exchange in Mark Lane in the City of London; and for other purposes.
- Citation: 35 & 36 Vict. c. xxxvi

Dates
- Royal assent: 27 June 1872

Other legislation
- Repealed by: Corn Exchange Act 1975

Status: Repealed

Text of statute as originally enacted

Corn Exchange Act 1914
- Act of Parliament
- Parliament of the United Kingdom
- Long title: An Act to make further provision as to the affairs of the Corn Exchange Company and for regulating the user of the Corn Exchange (Mark Lane).
- Citation: 4 & 5 Geo. 5. c. x

Dates
- Royal assent: 8 July 1914

Other legislation
- Repealed by: Corn Exchange Act 1975

Status: Repealed

Text of statute as originally enacted

London Corn Exchange Act 1917
- Act of Parliament
- Parliament of the United Kingdom
- Long title: An Act to confer further powers upon the London Corn Exchange Company to alter the capital of the Company and for other purposes.
- Citation: 7 & 8 Geo. 5. c. xiii

Dates
- Royal assent: 10 July 1917

Other legislation
- Repealed by: Corn Exchange Act 1929

Status: Repealed

Text of statute as originally enacted

Corn Exchange Act 1929
- Act of Parliament
- Parliament of the United Kingdom
- Long title: An Act to transfer to the Corn Exchange Company the undertaking of the London Corn Exchange Company to confer further powers on the Corn Exchange Company and authorise them to raise additional capital and for other purposes.
- Citation: 19 & 20 Geo. 5. c. xv

Dates
- Royal assent: 25 April 1929

Other legislation
- Repeals/revokes: London Corn Exchange Act 1826; London Corn Exchange Act 1917
- Repealed by: Corn Exchange Act 1975

Status: Repealed

Text of statute as originally enacted

Corn Exchange Act 1955
- Act of Parliament
- Parliament of the United Kingdom
- Long title: An Act to increase the capital and borrowing powers of the Corn Exchange Company and for other purposes.
- Citation: 4 & 5 Eliz. 2. c. xv

Dates
- Royal assent: 27 July 1955

Other legislation
- Repealed by: Corn Exchange Act 1969

Status: Repealed

Text of statute as originally enacted

Corn Exchange Act 1969
- Act of Parliament
- Parliament of the United Kingdom
- Long title: An Act to increase the capital and borrowing powers of the Corn Exchange Company; to convert the existing capital stock into shares; to confer further powers on the Company; and for other purposes.
- Citation: 1969 c. xxvi

Dates
- Royal assent: 25 June 1969

Other legislation
- Repeals/revokes: Corn Exchange Act 1955
- Repealed by: Corn Exchange Act 1975

Status: Repealed

Text of statute as originally enacted

Corn Exchange Act 1975
- Act of Parliament
- Parliament of the United Kingdom
- Long title: An Act to provide for the alteration of the share capital, the extension of the objects and powers and otherwise to increase the powers of The Corn Exchange Company Limited; and for other purposes.
- Citation: 1975 c. xii

Dates
- Royal assent: 22 May 1975

Other legislation
- Repeals/revokes: Corn Exchange Act 1872; Corn Exchange Act 1914; Corn Exchange Act 1969
- Amended by: Corn Exchange Act 1988

Status: Amended

Text of statute as originally enacted

Corn Exchange Act 1988
- Act of Parliament
- Parliament of the United Kingdom
- Long title: An Act to relieve The Corn Exchange Company Limited of its statutory obligations to provide a corn exchange; to alter the objects and powers of the Company; and for other purposes.
- Citation: 1988 c. x

Dates
- Royal assent: 15 March 1988

Other legislation
- Amends: Corn Exchange Act 1975

Status: Current legislation

Text of statute as originally enacted

In 1826 a group of discontented traders sought to establish a rival corn exchange, to be known as the London Corn Exchange. Permission having been granted by Parliament in the London Corn Exchange Act 1826 (7 Geo. 4. c. lv), they established their new corn exchange, also in Mark Lane, immediately to the north of the old corn exchange. The new building was designed by George Smith in the Greek Revival style, built in ashlar stone at a cost of £90,000 and was completed in 1828. The design involved a symmetrical main frontage of nine bays facing onto Mark Lane with the end bays slightly projected forward. The central section of seven bays featured a hexastyle portico formed by Doric order columns supporting an entablature, a frieze decorated by paterae, a cornice and a parapet. At the centre of the parapet there was a large commemorative stone inscribed with the words "Corn Exchange, Erected 1828, By Command of Parliament".

Corn merchants trading at the corn exchanges were required to make daily returns to the comptroller of corn returns for the purposes of paying duties. The volume of corn traded at the corn exchanges grew rapidly after the repeal of the Corn Laws in 1846. The old corn exchange was largely demolished and replaced by a far larger building designed by Edward I'Anson in the Italianate style and completed in 1882.

The use of the buildings as corn exchanges declined significantly in the wake of the Great Depression of British Agriculture in the late 19th century. Both exchanges continued in operation until they were amalgamated in 1926. An "Annual Pelting Rag" during which traders pelted each other in riotous fashion was held each year until 1929, when a trader was killed at Mark Lane and the tradition was abandoned.

Smith's new corn exchange was demolished in 1931; meanwhile, I'Anson's 1882 corn exchange was destroyed in 1941 during the Blitz in the Second World War. Its replacement, designed by Terence Heysham, was funded in part by the commercial letting of an eight-storey office block built as part of the design, and was officially opened by the Minister of Food, Gwilym Lloyd George, on 27 July 1953. It too was demolished and rebuilt in 1973; but the corn exchange continued trading "cereals of every kind, pulse vegetables, flour, seeds, animal feeds and fertilisers".

After several years' decline in trading the corn exchange building on Mark Lane closed in 1987; at the same time the market, and its remaining traders, relocated to the Baltic Exchange in St Mary Axe. However, the name "Corn Exchange" was preserved in the name of the building at numbers 55–56, Mark Lane, which was redeveloped by British Land and completed in 1996.

== See also ==
- Corn exchanges in England
