= George Smith (architect) =

English architect (1782–1869)

George Smith (28 September 1782 – 5 January 1869) was an English architect and surveyor of the early 19th century, with strong connections with central and south-east London.

== Life and work ==
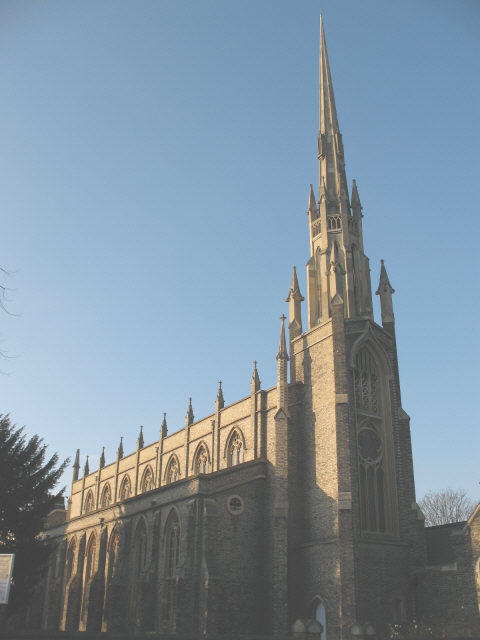
St Michael and All Angels, Blackheath Park (1828–9)

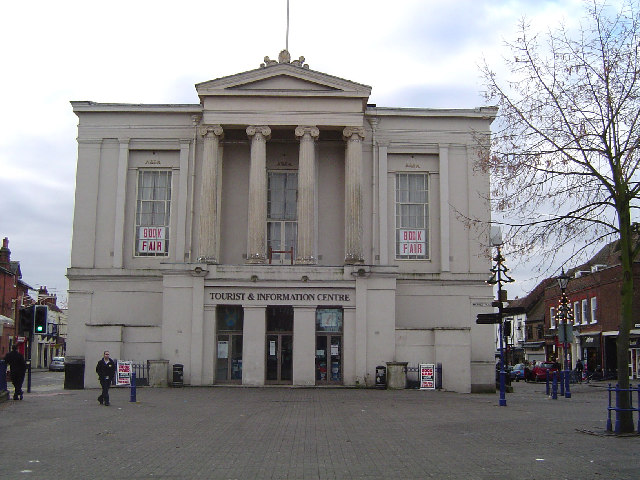
St Albans Town Hall (1829)

Smith was born on 28 September 1783 at Aldenham in Hertfordshire. He was articled to Robert Furze Brettingham, and later worked for James Wyatt, Daniel Asher Alexander, and then Charles Beazley, before eventually setting up his own practice in the City of London.

He was appointed District Surveyor of the southern division of the City in 1810, and was elected Surveyor to the Mercers' Company in 1814, holding both appointments until his death. He also held the post of Surveyor to the Coopers' Company, and later served as their master.

Smith's works included St Paul's School, then sited at the east end of St Paul's Churchyard (replacing a building demolished in 1824), and Gresham College in Basinghall Street (opened in 1843). For the Mercers' Company he built the Whittington Almshouses (1822) at Highgate, in a Gothic style; John Summerson noted that the company had sufficient wealth to afford "a great many crockets". Smith built the Mercers' School on the previous site of the almhouses, in College Hill in the city. At the Royal Exchange he replaced the wooden tower and entrance with a stone one. In collaboration with A.B. Clayton he built the New Corn Exchange in Mark Lane (1827), with a Doric colonnade, echoing that of George Dance's neighbouring exchange of 1749–50.

At Hornsey in 1832-3 he replaced the body of the church with a white brick Gothic structure, leaving only the medieval tower standing.

His Gothic church of St Michael and All Angels at Blackheath Park (1828–1829) on the Cator estate was built in white brick with stone facings, and has what the Buildings of England guide describes as "a fanciful thin east spire", sometimes called "the Needle of Kent". Ian Nairn describes it as "far more individual than the usual run", "more than a studious crib from a pattern book", and notes "the highly successful Eastern Tower". A house called "Brooklands" (1825), designed for himself survives nearby.

For the Cator family, Smith also rebuilt Woodbastwick Hall in Norfolk, following its damage by fire in 1819.

Smith later built later another house for himself, called "Newlands", at Copthorne, in Sussex.

He was also surveyor to the South East Rail Company and Morden College and his other works included:

- "Bellefield" (No. 26 Blackheath Park / 3 Foxes Dale, London SE3)
- Greenwich railway station (1840)
- College Place in Greenwich (1842)
- Blackheath railway station (1849)
- Housing estate centred on Pelton Road and Christchurch Way, east Greenwich, London

Works in his native Hertfordshire include the Church of St. Peter, London Colney, a very early example of the Norman revival style (1825) and the neoclassical St Albans Town Hall (1829), with a giant portico of four Ionic columns.

He was a member of the Royal Institute of British Architects, of which he was elected a Fellow in 1834, a member of the Surveyors' Club from 1807, and a Fellow of the Society of Antiquaries. He exhibited at the Royal Academy between 1801 and 1829.
