= Ovens and Murray Advertiser =

Newspaper in Victoria, Australia

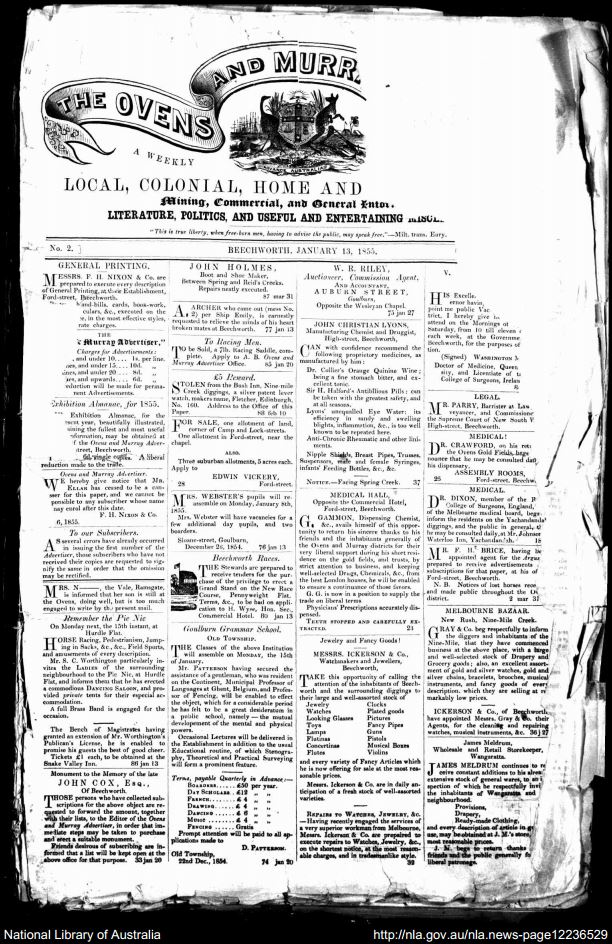
Ovens and Murray Advertiser

Ovens and Murray Advertiser (ISSN 2200-1344), also published as The Chiltern and Howlong times, Ovens register, and Beechworth and district news, is a weekly English language newspaper published in the town of Beechworth, Victoria, Australia.

== History ==
Published in Beechworth, Victoria from 1855, the paper was conceived by architect Francis Hodgson Nixon and auctioneer J.H Gray.

Ovens and Murray Advertiser was launched in Beechworth in 1855. In April 1918 the Ovens & Murray Advertiser absorbed the Ovens Register, which had previously been published as the Chiltern and Howling times and mining, commercial and agricultural directory (1886-1889) and the Chiltern and Howling times and Ovens register (1889-1918).

== Digitisation ==
The paper has been digitised as part of the Australian Newspapers Digitisation Program of the National Library of Australia.

== See also ==
- List of newspapers in Australia
