= St Anne and St Agnes =

Historic church in London, England

Coordinates: 51°30′59″N 0°5′47″W

St Anne & St Agnes Church
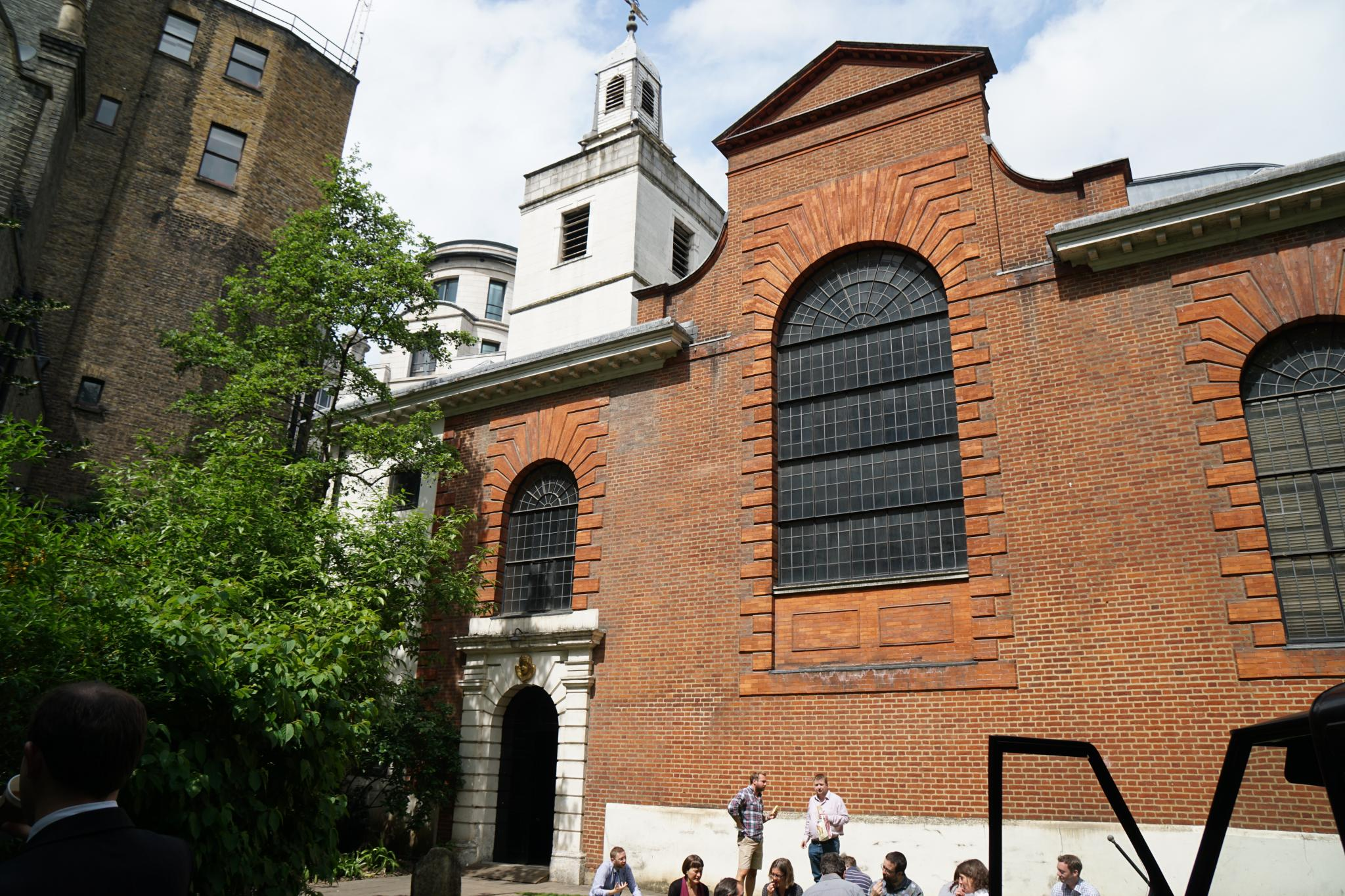
- Exterior of St Anne & St Agnes Church

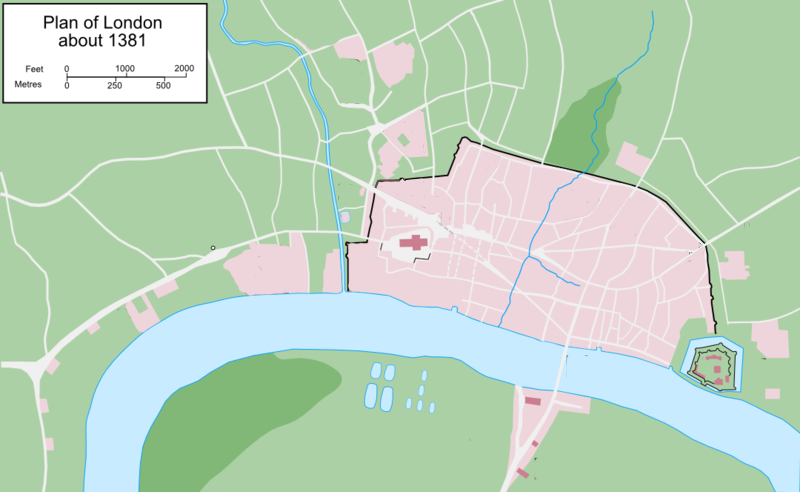
- Location within City of London Location within City of London in 1300
- Location: London, EC2
- Country: England
- Language: English
- Denomination: Anglican, Lutheran, originally Roman Catholic

History
- Former name(s): St Agnes near Alderychgate, St Anne-in-the-Willows
- Founded: By 1137
- Dedication: Saint Anne and Agnes of Rome

Architecture
- Heritage designation: Grade I listed building
- Architect: Sir Christopher Wren
- Style: English Baroque
- Years built: rebuilt 1680

St Anne and St Agnes is a church located at Gresham Street in the City of London, near the Barbican. While St Anne's is an Anglican foundation, from 1966 to 2013 it was let to a congregation of the Lutheran Church in Great Britain.

== History ==
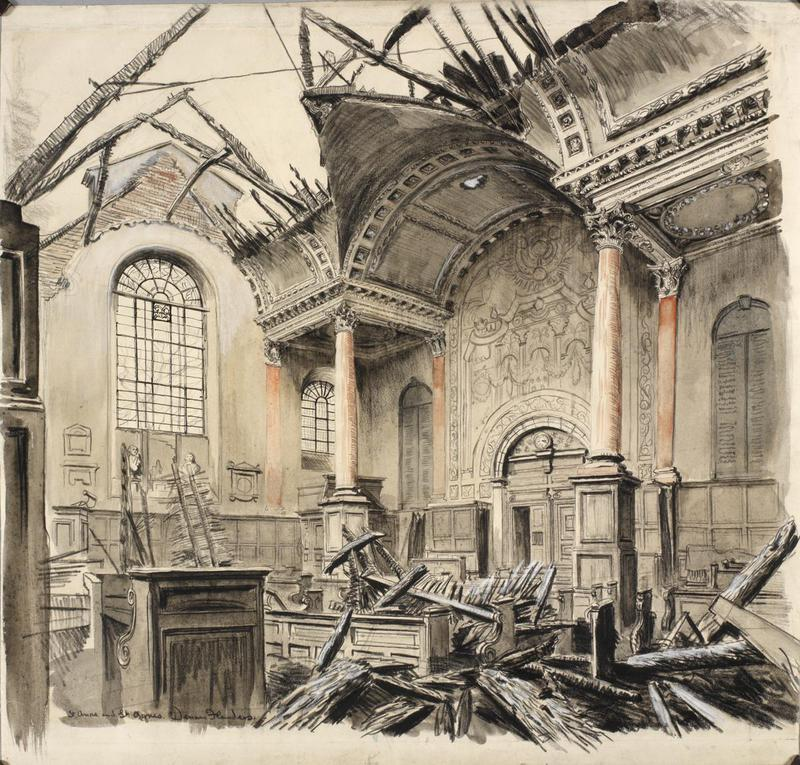
The Church of St Anne and St Agnes, Gresham Street, EC2, 1941 by Dennis Flanders

The first mention of a church on the present site is in documents of 1137 which refer to 'St Agnes near Alderychgate' and the 'priest of St Anne's' which was situated near Aldredesgate'. There was confusion over the name since the church was described variously in Norman records as St Anne-in-the-Willows and as St Agnes. Its unusual double dedication, unique in the City, seems to have been acquired some time in the 15th century. It is also uncertain which Saint Agnes is referred to; it is believed to be the 4th-century virgin martyr Agnes of Rome.

The church was gutted by a fire in 1548 but was rebuilt soon after. Further work was done in 1624. However, the building's 14th-century tower was its only section to survive the Great Fire of London in 1666 (and then only partially).

St Anne and St Agnes was rebuilt by Sir Christopher Wren in 1680, with possible contributions from Robert Hooke. The small brick church is of an unusual design in London, being based on that of a Greek cross; it utilises a vaulted square within a square, a formula based on the Nieuwe Kerk in Haarlem in the Netherlands. Wren also used a similar design at St Martin Ludgate and St Mary-at-Hill. The parish was united with the parish of St John Zachary by section 55 of the Rebuilding of London Act 1670 (22 Cha. 2. c. 11), as St John's was not rebuilt after the Great Fire.

The church was extensively restored in the 18th and 19th centuries, but was largely destroyed by Second World War bombing by German bombers during the London Blitz during the night of 29–30 December 1940. It was rededicated in 1966, largely through donations by the worldwide Lutheran church, for use by the exile Estonian and Latvian communities in London. The reconstructed interior is a mixture of replicas of the prewar fittings and original or copied fittings from other London churches, some of which had also been destroyed in the war but were not reconstructed. The congregation of St Anne's Lutheran Church left the church in June 2013, and began to share St Mary-at-Hill with its existing Anglican congregation. The building, now called the VOCES8 Centre, has become the home of the VOCES8 Foundation, an educational charity incorporating the vocal ensemble Voces8.

Famous past parishioners have included the poet John Milton and John Bunyan, author of Pilgrim's Progress. John Wesley, founder of Methodism, preached twice at the church in 1738. The church was designated a Grade I listed building on 4 January 1950.

== See also ==
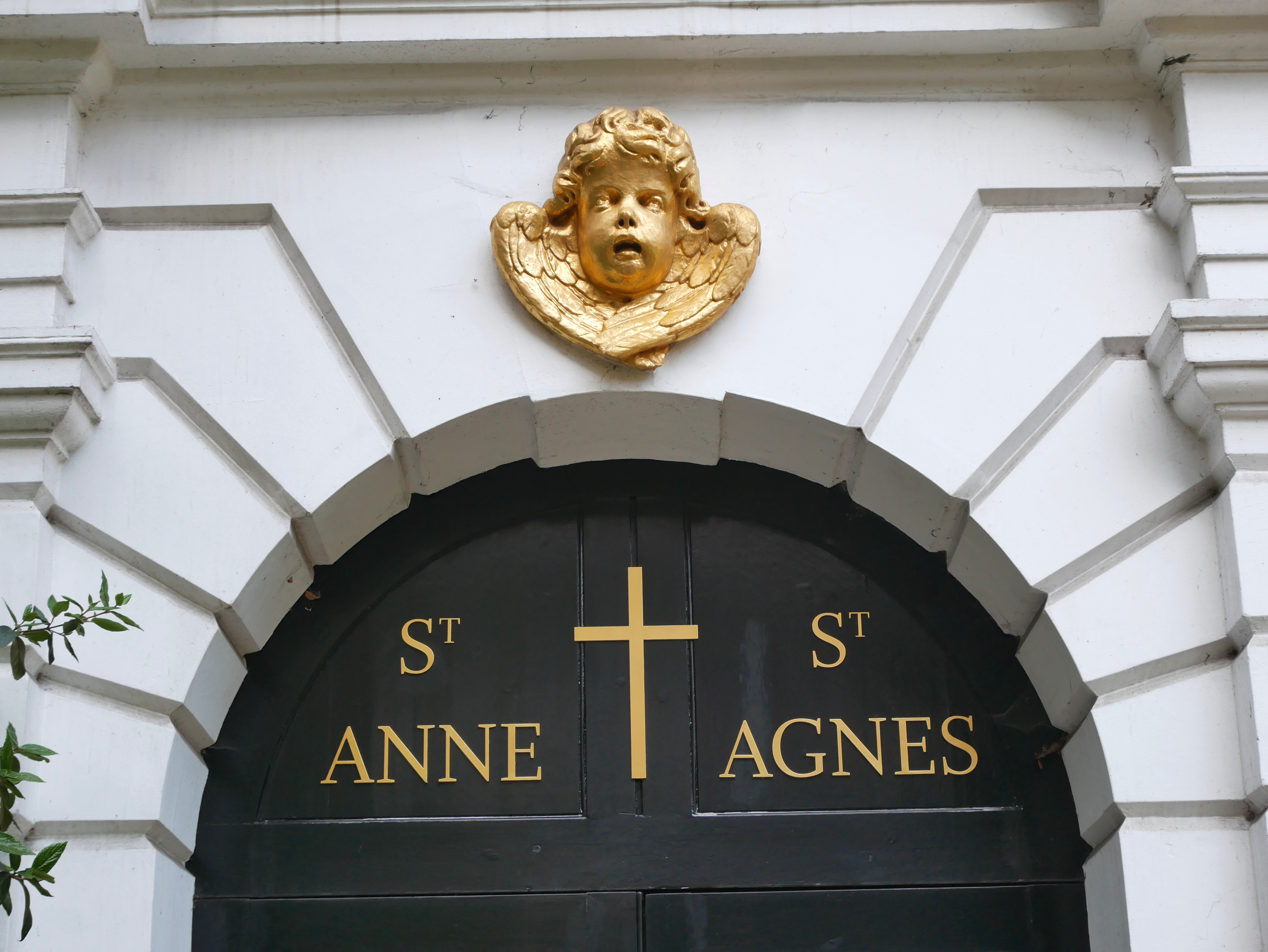
South doorway

- List of churches in London
- List of Christopher Wren churches in London
