= John Wallen =

British architect

John Wallen (1785–1865) was a 19th-century British architect and surveyor. He was the principal quantity surveyor in the City of London during the 1830s. Many of his former students, such as Edward I'Anson went on to have notable careers.

== Biography ==
Wallen was born in St Saviour parish, London. He was the older brother of William Wallen (1790–1873) who also became a well known surveyor. In 1807, as a minor, John married Maria Adams with the consent of his father, William Wallen. John and Maria had two sons and four daughters. Maria died in 1827.

On 3 July 1830, at Deptford St Paul, John married Harriet Edwards (1808–1852). Harriet was the sister-in-law of John's former pupil, Edward Jones. John and Harriet had two sons and four daughters. John Wallen died at 80 years of age, on 13 February 1865, at 14 Bedford Road, Stockwell.

== Professional life ==
Wallen was a pupil of Daniel Asher Alexander (1768–1846), architect and engineer. It is probable that Alexander's specialisation in the design of large industrial buildings and warehouses influenced Wallen's career. While Wallen produced only a few prominent buildings, his practice not only undertook projects requiring huge budgets but also offered an exceptional standard of training for his pupils. From about 1812 to 1826, Wallen was in partnership with George Ferry . From 1812 to 1819, 'Ferry and Wallen, Surveyors', operated from 5 Spital Square and also No. 17 (now No. 13) Elder Street. In 1817, 'Wallen and Ferry, Surveyors and Architects' appeared at No. 22 Folgate Street.

In 1813, Ferry and Wallen produced a report for the repair of Norton Folgate workhouse and in 1818, they built Myddelton House, Bulls Cross, Enfield for Henry Carrington Bowles the last Governor of the New River Company.

Myddelton House

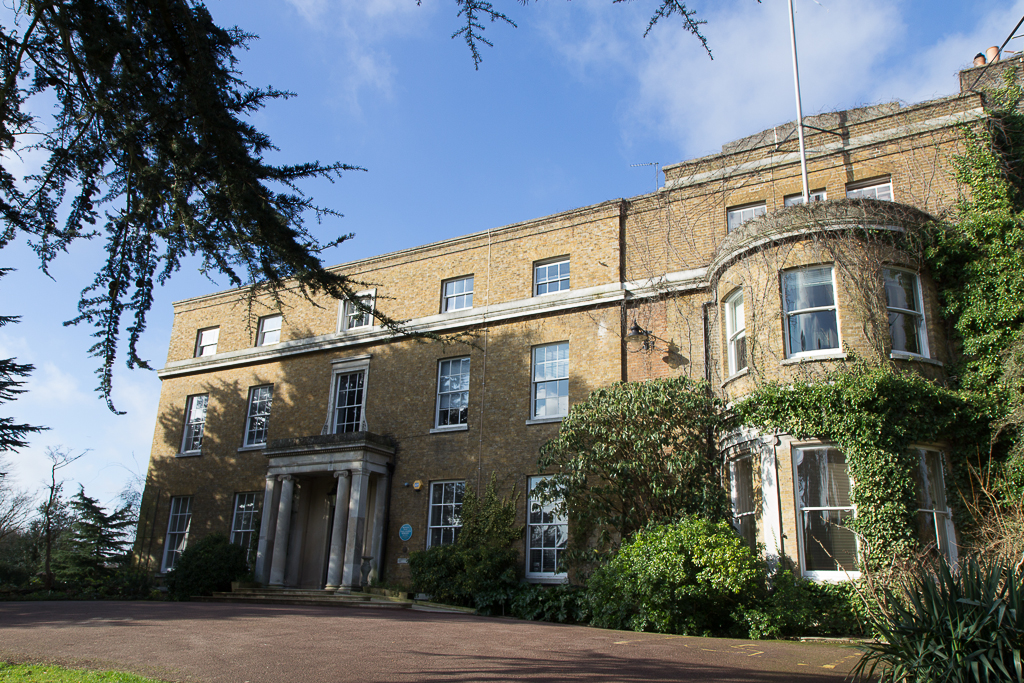

In 1817, Wallen joined other surveyors and builders to give opinion to the House of Commons that "the practice of employing children to climb and sweep chimneys should be abolished…" They also asserted that mechanical devices should be used instead of children.

In 1818, Thomas Wilson of Highbury outlaid over £6,000 to build Claremont Chapel in New Road (now No. 44a Pentonville Road), Pentonville. Wilson was a philanthropist who built several Non-conformist chapels in London. John Wallen, practicing nearby at 10 White Lion Street, was possibly the "Mr Wallen" who was paid £203 17s 8d for surveying. This substantial fee suggests that John or his brother William Wallen also designed the chapel. William is credited with two similar architectural projects; the non-conformist chapels in Newbury, Berkshire and Newark, Nottinghamshire, built between 1822 and 1823.

In 1830, William Beatson married John's daughter Maria Wallen. By 1831, John occupied 11 Spital Square, Liberty of Norton Folgate, London. Also by 1831, John, his son William Wallen(1807–1888) and William Beatson had become business partners. In 1836, the firm, Wallen, Son and Beatson, superintended the repairs of Christ Church, Spitalfields.

Warehouse design predominated in Wallen's work. At a time when the use of steel was treated with suspicion by many architectural theorists, his designs used "interior metal skeleton construction". Not only did this innovation allow Wallen to create warehouses with improved natural light and open space, it also gave him design flexibility in the emerging Neo-Classical era.

His work included warehouses in Milton Street (formerly Grub Street), Cripplegate for Messers Morrison; a block of buildings in Gresham (formerly Cateaton) Street for Morley & Co and a warehouse in Wood Street for Dent & Co.

In 1843, Wallen repaired the Unitarian Chapel, South Place, Finsbury Circus and from 1847 to 1850, he repaired the Church of St. Anne and St. Agnes, Gresham Street. In 1852, he repaired the Great Synagogue, Duke's Place, Aldgate. In 1852, Wallen designed St Mark's Hospital in City Road. The site was acquired from Dyers Company and the almshouses that occupied it were converted to a "fine new, three storey, Italianate building". The 25-bed hospital was opened on St Mark's Day, 25 April 1854.

In 1856, a witness to a burglary at 11 Spital Square told the Old Bailey "[John Wallen] is a great invalid, and not able to attend to his business". However, his son, John James Wallen (1818 – c. 1865), an auctioneer, continued his father's interest in the development of London, publishing both criticism of the Bishopsgate Rail Terminus and advice for the improvement of railway shares.

== Pupils ==
Wallen's pupils included:

- Sir Horace Jones (1819–1887), architect and surveyor to the City of London and designer of the Tower Bridge, London;
- Edward Jones (1797–1835), architect and surveyor, who practiced in Wrexham, Wales and regularly exhibited at the Royal Academy;
- Edward I'Anson (1812–1888), his work includes buildings in London;
- William Beatson (1807–1870), one of the first practicing architects to immigrate to New Zealand;
- William Wallen (1807–1888), John Wallen's son, practiced in Manchester Road, Huddersfield .
- Richard Hussey (1806–1887) architect to Chester Cathedral, vice-president of RIBA, partnership with Thomas Rickman
- Edward Walters (1808–1872) Pupil of Thomas Cubitt, Lewis Vulliamy, John Wallen, and finally Sir John Rennie. From 1939, he practised in Manchester
- Henry Jones Lanchester (1834–1914) Articled to William Wallen, educated in offices of John Wallen, Edward Ryde, Charles Broadbridge and William James Gardiner
