= William Wallen Jr. =

British architect

William Wallen Jr. (1817–1891) was an architect and surveyor in London. He is the son of William Wallen Sr. (1790–1873) also an architect and surveyor. The Wallen family was linked to British architecture during the 19th century.

== Early life ==
Wallen was born in Hoxton and married Mary Ann Sydney (1828–1899) at Guildhall in 1848. They produced four sons and one daughter. William died in Greenwich aged 74 Years.

== Career ==
William designed the first school in the Isle of Dogs. Millwall British School was built by James and Jonathan Coleman of Bermondsey in 1846–47. He also designed a Lecture Hall for the Deptford Literary Institution. It was built by Joseph Lester in 1852. William won an allegedly corrupt competition to design the Vestry Hall at the Greenwich Public Offices. The hall was built in 1876–77 by W. W. Allen.

William Wallen the younger of Lawrence Pountney Lane, in the City of London, Architect, Surveyor, Builder, Dealer and Chapman was declared bankrupt on 25 March 1854. William (jnr) was again declared bankrupt on 29 September 1869, but an Order of Discharge was granted on 10 December 1869. Francis Hodgson Nixon (1832–83) became a pupil of William (jnr) in 1846. By mutual consent, Nixon and Wallen annulled the indenture agreement in 1849. Nixon moved to Australia to pursue a career in architecture before turning to journalism.
