= William Wallen Sr. =

British architect

William Wallen Sr. (1790–1873) was both an architect and surveyor in London. His son, William Wallen Jr. (1817–1891) was also an architect and a surveyor. The Wallen family was linked to British architecture during the 19th century.

== Early life ==
Wallen was born in 1790 in Southwark, Surrey, the son of William Wallen and probably Frances Wallen née Smith. William married Amy Elizabeth Willcocks (1790–C 1865) at Guildhall, Blackfriars, in 1814. They lived in Hoxton, London, producing four sons and five daughters. William died at Hackney in 1873, aged 83. William Wallen Senior practised as an architect and surveyor, however; he appears to have favoured surveying commissions. His career was somewhat overshadowed by his older brother, John Wallen (1783–1865) who was an architect and the principal surveyor to London during the 1830s. Nevertheless, William is credited with at least two architectural projects between 1822 and 1823. They were non-conformist chapels in Newbury, Berkshire and Newark, Nottinghamshire. It is also suggested that he was the “Mr Wallen” who received a substantial fee for the survey and probably the design of Claremont Chapel in New Road, Pentonville.

== Career ==
During the 1830s, William’s professional office was at 1 Circus Place, Finsbury. Here he designed the British School in Wood Street, Spitalfields, and the Abbey Street British School in Bethnal Green. He briefly employed Owen Jones, a pupil of architect Lewis Vulliamy. This was probably an arrangement between Vulliamy and Wallen to equip Jones with essential surveying skills before he undertook a Grand Tour of Europe and the Middle East in 1832.

Wallen family correspondence, dating from the 1800s, indicates that one, or both, the Wallen brothers were involved in the surveying of the London to Birmingham railway. Apparently, a ‘mistake’ caused the Wallens' major financial hardship. Notably, William was declared bankrupt in February 1839. Undaunted, William returned to the Court in the same year. In Wallen v. Smith, he successfully appealed costs exceeding £40 previously awarded against him. His case became legal precedent referred to during the 1800s. By 1848, William had opened an office at 17 King St, London City and through the 1850s, he and his son, William (Jnr), operated from 25 Bassinghall Street, London. In 1850, Henry Jones Lanchester (1834–1914) was articled to William Wallen and was educated in several offices including that of John Wallen. Lanchester is noted for laying out part of Hove and also the design of Palmeira Mansions, Hove.
