= Henry Noel Humphreys =

British illustrator, naturalist, entomologist, and numismatist

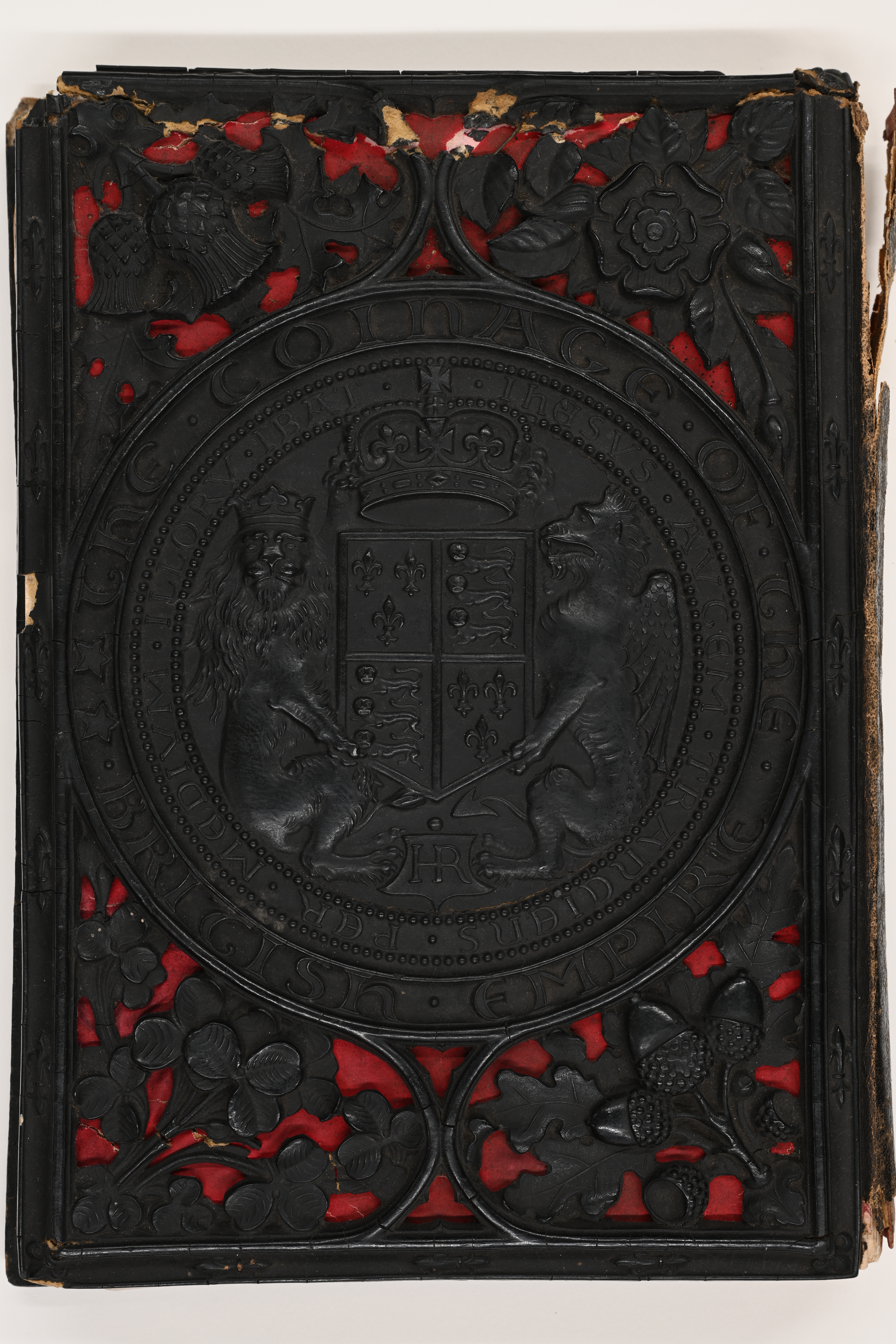
The back cover of Humphreys' Coinage of the British Empire (1855), in a papier-mâché binding also designed by Humphreys.

Henry Noel Humphreys (1810–1879), was a British illustrator, naturalist, entomologist, and numismatist.

Humphreys was born on 4 January 1810 in Birmingham, the son of James Humphreys, and was educated at King Edward's School there. He studied medieval manuscripts in Italy as a young man, and became an accomplished scholar in numerous subjects. In addition to his entomological texts, Humphreys wrote works on ancient Greek and Roman coins, archaeology, and the art of writing and printing.

He died on 10 June 1879.

== Works ==
- A Record of the Black Prince. A Series of original passages from the chroniclers relating to the career and exploits of Edward the Black Prince; enriched with highly-wrought illuminations from different Manuscripts referring to the history of the period. In a elaborate pierced paper mache binding. London: Longman and Co, 1850.
- British Moths and Their Transformations. With John Obadiah Westwood London: William Smith, 1843–1845. 2 Volumes.
- The Parables of Our Lord.. New York: D. Appleton, 1848. London: Longman and Co, 1847.
- The Miracles of Our Lord. 1848.
- The Coins of England. William Smith, London. 1848.
- Maxims and Precepts of the Saviour.
- The Illuminated Books of the Middle Ages, (large folio): a Series of Magnificent Specimens, of the size of the originals, from the finest illuminated MSS. From the 4th to the 17th Century. London Longman, Brown, Green, and Longmans, 1849.
- The Book of Ruth. London, Longman and Co, 1850.
- Sentiments and Similes of William Shakespeare. London, Longman Brown, Green, Longmans and Roberts, 1851 & 1857.
- Art of Illumination. (18 ) - a manual on the technique of illumination. It contains high-quality chromolithographs, some printed in fourteen different colors. It is bound in white leather with a chromolithograph paper label inset into the binding and lined with gold.
- The Butterfly Vivarium., or Insect Home: Being an Account of a New Method of Observing the Curious Metamorphoses of Some of the Most Beautiful of Our Native Insects, Comprising also a Popular Description of the Habits and Instincts of Many of the Insects of the Various Classes Referred to, with Suggestions for the Successful Study of Entomology by Means of an Insect Vivarium. London: William Lay, King William Street, Strand, 1853.
- The Coinage of the British Empire.: An outline of the Progress of the coinage in Great Britain and her dependencies, from the earliest period to the present time. Published David Bogue, Fleet Stteet, 1855 with plates worked in gold silver & copper.
- Ancient Coins: being a concise account of the origin of the art of coining, its early progress, highest development, and its gradual decay with the decline of the Roman Empire. Illustrated by a number of specimens in relief, in gold, silver and copper, in positive facsimile of the originals. Grant & Griffith, 1850.
- River Gardens: being an account of the best methods of cultivating fresh-water plants in aquaria in such a manner as to afford suitable abodes to ornamental fish, and many interesting kinds of aquatic animals. Sampson Low, Son, and Co., London, 1857
- The Genera and Species of British Butterflies: being described and arranged according to the system adopted by the British Museum. Illustrated by 32 hand coloured lithographs of all the species then known to inhabit or visit the British Isles, including their caterpillars and the plants upon which they feed. London, Paul Gerrard & Son, 1859.
- The Genera of British Moths
- Insect Changes
- A History of the Art of Printing, From its Invention to its Wide-Spread Development in the Middle of the 16th Century, Preceded by a Short Account of the Origin of the Alphabet, and the Successive Methods of Recording Events and Multiplying Ms. Books Before the Invention of Printing. London: Bernard Quaritch, 1867 (first issue).
