= Papier-mâché binding =

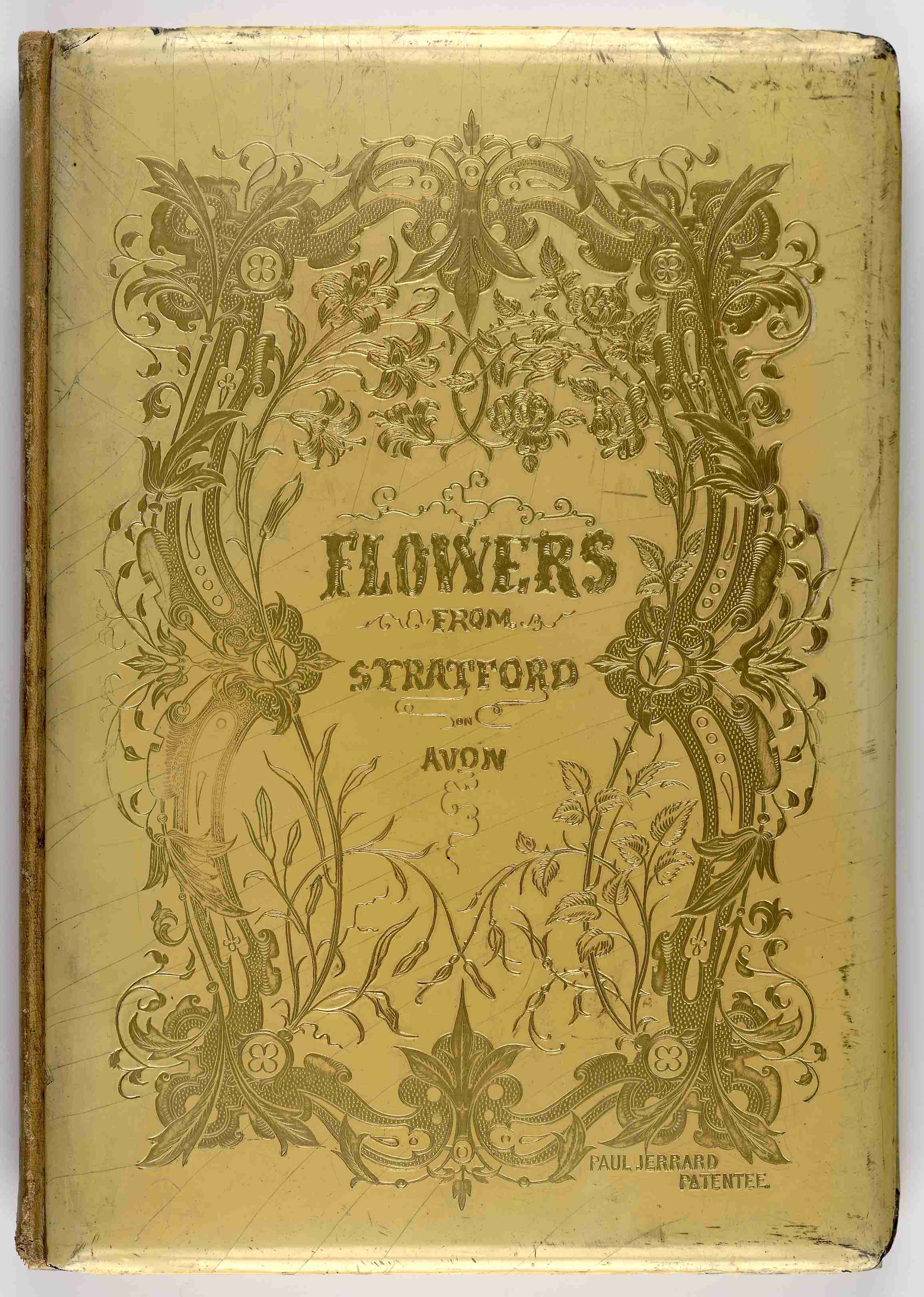
Flowers from Stratford on Avon. Paper (dyed yellow) has been drawn over the boards. The cover material is papier-mâché. The boards resemble wood, and are smooth bevelled. Yellow endleaves and pastedowns printed in gold. A gift book produced by Paul Jerrard.

Papier-mâché binding is an approach to bookbinding in which the boards of the book are decoratively-sculpted papier-mâché covered in plaster, pressed in a mold. Papier-mâché binding was used in England during the mid-nineteenth century.

== See also ==
- Victorian era
