= 1994 Harrow London Borough Council election =

- 5 May 1994

All 63 seats up for election to Harrow London Borough Council 32 seats needed for a majority
- Registered: 148,757
- Turnout: 72,708, 48.88% (▼2.24)

	First party	Second party
Leader	Christopher Noyce	Donald Abbott
Party	Liberal Democrats	Conservative
Leader since	14 May 1993 (Note: Noyce replaced Howard Cooper after he resigned citing ill-health)	21 Oct 1991
Leader's seat	Rayners Lane	Hatch End
Last election	11 seats, 21.07%	36 seats, 47.91%
Seats before	13	34
Seats won	29	17
Seat change	▲16	▼17
Popular vote	69,701	69,075
Percentage	34.14%	33.83%
Swing	▲13.07	▼14.08
	Third party	Fourth party
Leader	Albert Toms	Unknown
Party	Labour	Ind. Residents
Leader since	8 May 1990 (Note: Toms was elected as leader at the local party annual general meeting)	Unknown
Leader's seat	Kenton East	Unknown
Last election	13 seats, 27.98%	3 seats, 2.08%
Seats before	13	3
Seats won	14	3
Seat change	▲1	Steady
Popular vote	59,837	5,259
Percentage	29.31%	2.58%
Swing	▲1.33	▲0.50
Council control before election
Conservative
Council control after election
No Overall Control

The 1994 Harrow Council election took place on 5 May 1994 to elect members of Harrow London Borough Council in London, England. The whole council was up for election and the council went in no overall control.

== Background ==
The Harrow London Borough Council had been under Conservative Party control following the 1990 Harrow London Borough Council election, at which the Conservatives won 36 of the 63 available seats, with the Liberal Democrats on 11, Labour on 13, and the Independent Residents Association holding 3. Over the subsequent four-year term, a number of by-elections and changes of political allegiance altered the council's composition, and by February 1994 the Conservatives held 34 seats, the Liberal Democrats 13, Labour 13, and others 3.

== Election result ==
1994 Harrow London Borough Council elections
Party	Seats	Gains	Losses	Net gain/loss	Seats %	Votes %	Votes	+/−
Liberal Democrats	29	16	0	▲16	46.03	34.14	69,701	▲13.07
Conservative	17	0	17	▼17	26.98	33.83	69,075	▼14.08
Labour	14	4	3	▲1	22.22	29.31	59,837	▲1.33
Ind. Residents	3	0	0	Steady	4.76	2.58	5,259	▲0.50
Independent	0	0	0	Steady	0.00	0.14	289	▼0.46
Total	63						204,161	

== Ward results ==
(*) - Indicates an incumbent candidate

(†) - Indicates an incumbent candidate standing in a different ward

=== Canons ===
Canons (3)
Party	Candidate	Votes	%	±%
Conservative	John Cowan*	1,551	52.68	▼15.75
Conservative	Garry Leon* (Note: Leon replaced Cllr Ronald Grant after his resignation in 1993)	1,468		
Conservative	Richard Romain*	1,434		
Liberal Democrats	Philip Benjamin	1,007	34.65	▲25.72
Liberal Democrats	Ronald Warshaw	982		
Liberal Democrats	Anthony Noakes	939		
Labour	Charles Blake	378	12.67	▼9.97
Labour	Danielle Mercey	351		
Labour	David Rice	342		
Registered electors		6,223		▼789
Turnout		3,012	48.40	▼0.12
Rejected ballots		5	0.17	▼0.04
Conservative hold				
Conservative hold				
Conservative hold				

=== Centenary ===
Centenary (3)
Party	Candidate	Votes	%	±%
Labour	Paul Fox	1,409	45.92	▼5.16
Labour	Daniel Redford	1,365		
Labour	Keekira Thammaiah	1,365		
Conservative	Robert Goodman	1,224	40.23	▼19.01
Conservative	John Campbell*	1,208		
Conservative	Jayantha Amarasinghe	1,194		
Liberal Democrats	Oenone Cox	440	13.84	New
Liberal Democrats	Valerie Baxter	413		
Liberal Democrats	Susan Bartrick	394		
Registered electors		6,678		▲233
Turnout		3,260	48.82	▼5.52
Rejected ballots		15	0.46	▲0.12
Labour gain from Conservative				
Labour gain from Conservative				
Labour gain from Conservative				

=== Greenhill ===
Greenhill (3)
Party	Candidate	Votes	%	±%
Liberal Democrats	Maureen de Beer* (Note: replaced Cllr Leslie Nixon following their death in 1993)	1,333	44.56	▲10.62
Liberal Democrats	Peter Budden	1,184		
Liberal Democrats	Nahid Boethe	1,181		
Labour	Jeffrey Anderson	908	29.89	▲0.78
Labour	Norman Campbell	802		
Labour	Mark Schuck	771		
Conservative	Anthony Seymour	716	25.55	▼11.40
Conservative	Henry Paterson	715		
Conservative	Henry Venour	689		
Registered electors		5,791		▼230
Turnout		2,960	51.11	▲1.47
Rejected ballots		10	0.34	▲0.11
Liberal Democrats hold				
Liberal Democrats gain from Conservative				
Liberal Democrats gain from Conservative				

=== Harrow on the Hill ===
Harrow on the Hill (3)
Party	Candidate	Votes	%	±%
Conservative	Eileen Kinnear*	1,305	41.74	▼12.07
Conservative	Duncan Rogers*	1,304		
Conservative	Cliver Scowen*	1,285		
Liberal Democrats	Philip Mellor	1,012	31.45	▲14.00
Liberal Democrats	Adrien Smith	968		
Liberal Democrats	Peter Fletcher	954		
Labour	John Powell	712	21.96	▲3.26
Labour	Gerald Stonehouse	683		
Labour	Alexander Webb	655		
Independent	Roy Edey	151	4.86	New
Registered electors		7,317		▲135
Turnout		3,229	44.13	▼3.67
Rejected ballots		7	0.22	▲0.16
Conservative hold				
Conservative hold				
Conservative hold				

=== Harrow Weald ===
Harrow Weald (3)
Party	Candidate	Votes	%	±%
Liberal Democrats	Brian Williams* (Note: Williams replaced Cllr Howard Cooper after his resignation)	2,052	60.07	▲15.06
Liberal Democrats	Patricia Lyne*	2,023		
Liberal Democrats	Mary Graham	1,981		
Conservative	Thomas Brown	836	24.10	▼12.80
Conservative	Trevor Goodman	818		
Conservative	Paul Stanley	777		
Labour	Colin Crouch	565	15.83	▼2.26
Labour	Colin Gray	534		
Labour	Rajeshri Shah	496		
Registered electors		7,494		▲283
Turnout		3,542	47.26	▼7.67
Rejected ballots		3	0.08	▼0.05
Liberal Democrats hold				
Liberal Democrats hold				
Liberal Democrats hold				

=== Hatch End ===
Hatch End (3)
Party	Candidate	Votes	%	±%
Conservative	Donald Abbott*	1,638	51.12	▼14.10
Conservative	Mary John	1,570		
Conservative	Jean Lammiman	1,498		
Liberal Democrats	Geraldine Finch	912	28.74	▲13.92
Liberal Democrats	James Jackson	870		
Liberal Democrats	John Gray	865		
Labour	Susan Anderson	641	20.14	▲0.18
Labour	Ronald Fairhead	609		
Labour	John Solomon	605		
Registered electors		6,945		▼98
Turnout		3,269	47.07	▼4.84
Rejected ballots		2	0.06	▼0.10
Conservative hold				
Conservative hold				
Conservative hold				

=== Headstone North ===
Headstone North (3)
Party	Candidate	Votes	%	±%
Liberal Democrats	John Knight	1,761	44.39	▲19.57
Liberal Democrats	Nicola Lane	1,746		
Liberal Democrats	Janet Skipworth	1,682		
Conservative	John Nickolay	1,609	40.16	▼17.07
Conservative	Eric Silver*	1,547		
Conservative	Arthur Turner*	1,538		
Labour	Susan Gray	643	15.45	▼2.50
Labour	Asoke Dutta	592		
Labour	Gary Simms	572		
Registered electors		7,620		▲183
Turnout		4,097	53.77	▲1.33
Rejected ballots		4	0.10	▼0.16
Liberal Democrats gain from Conservative				
Liberal Democrats gain from Conservative				
Liberal Democrats gain from Conservative				

=== Headstone South ===
Headstone South (3)
Party	Candidate	Votes	%	±%
Liberal Democrats	Stepehen Giles-Medhurst*	1,567	47.05	▲6.74
Liberal Democrats	John Branch*	1,475		
Liberal Democrats	Derek Wiseman*	1,455		
Labour	Margaret Davine	1,022	31.45	▲3.37
Labour	Archie Foulds	996		
Labour	William Stephenson	987		
Conservative	Peter Hardy	576	17.17	▼7.53
Conservative	Jean Keen	536		
Conservative	John Medcalf	529		
Independent	Colin Palmer	138	4.33	New
Registered electors		6,534		▼199
Turnout		3,293	50.40	▲1.11
Rejected ballots		4	0.12	▲0.06
Liberal Democrats hold				
Liberal Democrats hold				
Liberal Democrats hold				

=== Kenton East ===
Kenton East (3)
Party	Candidate	Votes	%	±%
Labour	Cyril Davies*	1,849	61.85	▲7.57
Labour	Navin Shah	1,813		
Labour	Albert Toms*	1,756		
Conservative	John Hall	795	24.52	▼12.54
Conservative	Walter Harland	718		
Conservative	Jeremy Zeid	634		
Liberal Democrats	Karen Daniels	443	13.63	▲4.97
Liberal Democrats	Charlotte Lambden	379		
Liberal Democrats	Mark Salter	371		
Registered electors		7,302		▲19
Turnout		3,293	45.10	▲0.38
Rejected ballots		11	0.33	▲0.08
Labour hold				
Labour hold				
Labour hold				

=== Kenton West ===
Kenton West (3)
Party	Candidate	Votes	%	±%
Conservative	Janet Cowan*	1,358	39.96	▼15.46
Labour	Raymond Frogley	1,355	39.27	▲7.44
Conservative	Joseph Grenfell	1,345		
Labour	Jack Gilbert	1,334		
Conservative	David Topper*	1,320		
Labour	John Rowe	1,265		
Liberal Democrats	Sally Harvey	754	20.77	▲8.02
Liberal Democrats	Lala Das	673		
Liberal Democrats	Jean Macklin	664		
Registered electors		7,685		▲42
Turnout		3,627	47.20	▼4.44
Rejected ballots		4	0.11	▲0.01
Conservative hold				
Labour gain from Conservative				
Conservative hold				

=== Marlborough ===
Marlborough (3)
Party	Candidate	Votes	%	±%
Liberal Democrats	Veronica Chamberlain	1,258	40.92	▲5.06
Labour	Ann Groves*	1,248	40.47	▲1.84
Liberal Democrats	Brian Campbell	1,229		
Labour	Phillip O'Dell*	1,172		
Labour	Pravin Shah*	1,134		
Liberal Democrats	Baldev Sharma	1,107		
Conservative	Stephen Jobson	552	18.61	▼6.90
Conservative	Stephen Bye	551		
Conservative	Dennis Orger	531		
Registered electors		6,465		▼108
Turnout		3,141	48.58	▼1.15
Rejected ballots		4	0.13	▼0.05
Liberal Democrats gain from Labour				
Labour hold				
Liberal Democrats gain from Labour				

=== Pinner ===
Pinner (3)
Party	Candidate	Votes	%	±%
Conservative	Mavis Champagnie*	1,879	58.10	▲9.32
Conservative	Andrew Olins*	1,826		
Conservative	Antony Cocksedge	1,813		
Liberal Democrats	David Crawford	759	21.93	▲11.33
Liberal Democrats	Ian Green	708		
Labour	Frances Trott	665	19.97	▲6.41
Labour	Sean White	643		
Liberal Democrats	Julia Todesco	615		
Labour	Ashok Kumar	589		
Registered electors		7,399		▲134
Turnout		3,356	45.36	▼8.18
Rejected ballots		6	0.18	▼0.03
Conservative hold				
Conservative hold				
Conservative hold				

=== Pinner West ===
Pinner West (3)
Party	Candidate	Votes	%	±%
Liberal Democrats	Graham Finch	1,932	47.05	▲30.99
Liberal Democrats	David Walster	1,785		
Liberal Democrats	John Tuck	1,728		
Conservative	Jean Clark*	1,720	41.16	▼24.10
Conservative	Mark Mallon* (Note: Mallon replaced Cllr Charles Green after his death in 1992)	1,560		
Conservative	Ernest Sailor^{†} (Note: Sailor was a sitting councillor representing the Greenhill ward)	1,485		
Labour	Joseph Lilley	477	11.79	▼6.90
Labour	Anthony Scott	451		
Labour	Phyllis Trott	437		
Registered electors		7,126		▲38
Turnout		4,040	56.69	▲2.30
Rejected ballots		6	0.15	▲0.05
Liberal Democrats gain from Conservative				
Liberal Democrats gain from Conservative				
Liberal Democrats gain from Conservative				

=== Rayners Lane ===
Rayners Lane (3)
Party	Candidate	Votes	%	±%
Liberal Democrats	Christoper Noyce*	2,279	62.87	▲9.38
Liberal Democrats	Alastair Alexander	1,994		
Liberal Democrats	Prakash Nandhra*	1,994		
Conservative	Stephanie Goldman	809	23.32	▼8.20
Conservative	John Probyn	763		
Conservative	Pesi Nanji	754		
Labour	David Barrett	494	13.81	▼1.18
Labour	Donovan Reuben	451		
Labour	Ernest Selby	433		
Registered electors		6,630		▼192
Turnout		3,529	53.23	▼3.42
Rejected ballots		5	0.14	▲0.01
Liberal Democrats hold				
Liberal Democrats hold				
Liberal Democrats hold				

=== Ridgeway ===
Ridgeway (3)
Party	Candidate	Votes	%	±%
Liberal Democrats	Herbert Crossman	1,483	42.44	▲10.12
Liberal Democrats	Norah Murphy	1,470		
Liberal Democrats	Andrew Wiseman	1,456		
Conservative	Leonard Harsant*	1,194	33.11	▼7.15
Conservative	Jane Swinton*	1,140		
Conservative	John Rennie	1,107		
Labour	Brian Gate	883	24.45	▲3.93
Labour	Alex Bruce	840		
Labour	Kevin Gray	818		
Registered electors		6,874		▲291
Turnout		3,629	52.79	▼4.89
Rejected ballots		2	0.06	▲0.06
Liberal Democrats gain from Conservative				
Liberal Democrats gain from Conservative				
Liberal Democrats gain from Conservative				

=== Roxbourne ===
Roxbourne (3)
Party	Candidate	Votes	%	±%
Liberal Democrats	Susan Boobis*	1,716	44.52	▲9.01
Liberal Democrats	John Skipworth*	1,615		
Liberal Democrats	Robert Prowse	1,612		
Labour	Glyn Davies*	1,393	36.20	▲2.42
Labour	Huw Davies	1,362		
Labour	Susan Thomason	1,265		
Conservative	Lily Nickolay	732	19.29	▼11.42
Conservative	Stephen Dixon	720		
Conservative	Norman Stevenson	691		
Registered electors		7,278		▼59
Turnout		3,870	53.17	▼1.98
Rejected ballots		5	0.13	▼0.02
Liberal Democrats hold				
Liberal Democrats hold				
Liberal Democrats gain from Labour				

=== Roxeth ===
Roxeth (3)
Party	Candidate	Votes	%	±%
Ind. Residents	Neville Hughes*	1,776	51.02	▲9.91
Ind. Residents	John Cripps*	1,771		
Ind. Residents	Alan Hamlin*	1,712		
Labour	Jeremy Miles	1,235	33.67	▼0.42
Labour	Jonathan Ransley	1,146		
Labour	Timothy Oelman	1,091		
Conservative	Raymond Arnold	538	15.31	▼9.49
Conservative	Stephen Hall	529		
Conservative	Jeffrey Needham	512		
Registered electors		7,346		▼60
Turnout		3,613	49.18	▼1.47
Rejected ballots		7	0.19	▲0.06
Ind. Residents hold				
Ind. Residents hold				
Ind. Residents hold				

=== Stanmore Park ===
Stanmore Park (3)
Party	Candidate	Votes	%	±%
Conservative	Camilla Bath*	1,759	59.77	▼6.00
Conservative	Christine Bednell*	1,716		
Conservative	Neil Whitfield	1,634		
Labour	Alfred Elderton	628	22.01	▲2.00
Labour	Anthony Smith	628		
Labour	Lilu Elderton	624		
Liberal Democrats	Shirley Williams	545	18.22	▲9.14
Liberal Democrats	Leslie Moss	518		
Liberal Democrats	Shanta Das	493		
Registered electors		7,563		▲15
Turnout		3,080	40.72	▼5.99
Rejected ballots		4	0.13	▼0.07
Conservative hold				
Conservative hold				
Conservative hold				

=== Stanmore South ===
Stanmore South (3)
Party	Candidate	Votes	%	±%
Labour	Simon Brown*	2,169	57.68	▲2.37
Labour	Tony McNulty*	2,094		
Labour	Robert Lawrence*	2,049		
Conservative	Khalid Mahmood	1,201	31.03	▼5.91
Conservative	Edward Kerr	1,168		
Conservative	David Wesley-Rogers	1,028		
Liberal Democrats	Stephani Bartrick	423	11.29	▲3.54
Liberal Democrats	James Bartrick	421		
Liberal Democrats	Carol Prowse	392		
Registered electors		8,593		▲1,858
Turnout		4,050	47.13	▼1.10
Rejected ballots		9	0.22	▼0.24
Labour hold				
Labour hold				
Labour hold				

=== Wealdstone ===
Wealdstone (3)
Party	Candidate	Votes	%	±%
Labour	Ann Swaine*	1,582	54.23	▲6.42
Labour	Robert Shannon*	1,536		
Labour	Gareth Thomas*	1,516		
Liberal Democrats	Delia Campbell	745	25.20	▲4.60
Liberal Democrats	Norman Simmons	706		
Liberal Democrats	Yvonne Palmer	703		
Conservative	Anne Jobson	598	20.57	▼11.02
Conservative	Jane Fitzgerald	582		
Conservative	Stewart Bolasco	579		
Registered electors		6,531		▼185
Turnout		3,065	46.93	▼0.84
Rejected ballots		7	0.23	▲0.01
Labour hold				
Labour hold				
Labour hold				

=== Wemborough ===
Wemborough (3)
Party	Candidate	Votes	%	±%
Liberal Democrats	Laurence Cox* (Note: Cox replaced Cllr Richard Denney after his resignation in 1991)	1,919	52.15	New
Liberal Democrats	Olga Abrahams	1,815		
Liberal Democrats	Anne Diamond	1,801		
Conservative	Jonathan Lemon^{†} (Note: Lemon was a sitting councillor representing the Headstone North ward)	1,273	34.57	▼35.90
Conservative	Marilyn Ashton	1,225		
Conservative	Paul Lennon	1,171		
Labour	Joyce Angeletta	480	13.28	▼16.25
Labour	Howard Bluston	473		
Labour	William Spring	456		
Registered electors		7,363		▲243
Turnout		3,753	50.97	▲2.88
Rejected ballots		7	0.19	▼0.13
Liberal Democrats hold				
Liberal Democrats gain from Conservative				
Liberal Democrats gain from Conservative				
