= 1998 Harrow London Borough Council election =

1998 local election in England

- 7 May 1998

all 63 seats up for election to Harrow London Borough Council 32 seats needed for a majority
- Registered: 155,120
- Turnout: 56,846, 36.65 (▼12.23)

	First party	Second party
Leader	Robert Shannon (Note: Shannon was the leader of the Labour Party group as of this meeting on the 23 April 1998 and at a meeting held just after the election)	Christine Bednell (Note: Bednell was still leader of the Conservative group in the last meeting before the election and the first meeting just after the election)
Party	Labour	Conservative
Leader since	19 Feb 1998 (Note: Shannon was first mentioned as leader of the Labour Group in the minutes of a meeting that took place on 19 Feb 1998)	18 July 1996 (Note: Bednell was first referenced as leader of the Harrow Conservative Group in the minutes of a meeting held on 18 July 1996, so at some time between the last meeting on the 25 April 1996 and then she replaced Cllr Romain as leader)
Leader's seat	Wealdstone	Stanmore Park
Last election	14 seats, 29.31%	17 seats, 33.83%
Seats before	16	18
Seats won	32	20
Seat change	▲16	▲4
Popular vote	61,556	51,809
Percentage	39.48%	33.23%
Swing	▲10.17	▼0.60
	Third party	Fourth party
Leader	Christopher Noyce (Note: Noyce was identified as leader of the Liberal Democrats in Harrow Council in the minutes of the last meeting held before the election on 23 April 1998)	John Cripps (Note: Cripps was referenced as a leader of the Independent Residents Group both in a meeting held just before the election On 23 April 1998 and in the first meeting after the election on 20 May 1998)
Party	Liberal Democrats	Ind. Residents
Leader since	7 Nov 1997 (Note: The earliest mention by name of Noyce being the leader of the Liberal Democrats is from am meeting held on the 14 July 1994, however he was briefly replaced By Cllr. Wiseman from 18 July 1996 until sometime between 17 July 1997 and the 7 November 1997)	23 Apr 1998 (Note: The earliest reference to Cllr Cripps being the leader is in the minutes of a meeting that took place on the 23 April 1998)
Leader's seat	Rayners Lane	Roxeth
Last election	29 seats, 34.14%	3 seats, 2.58%
Seats before	26	2
Seats won	9	2
Seat change	▼20	Steady
Popular vote	37,244	4,475
Percentage	23.89%	2.87%
Swing	▼10.25	▲0.29
Council control before election
No Overall Control
Council control after election
Labour

The 1998 Harrow Borough Council election took place on 7 May 1998 to elect members of Harrow London Borough Council in London, England. The whole council was up for election and the Labour Party gained overall control of the council.

== Election result ==
1998 Harrow London Borough Council elections
Party	Seats	Gains	Losses	Net gain/loss	Seats %	Votes %	Votes	+/−
Labour	32	16	0	▲16	50.79	39.48	61,556	▲10.17
Conservative	20	7	3	▲4	31.75	33.23	51,809	▼0.60
Liberal Democrats	9	0	20	▼20	14.29	23.89	37,244	▼10.25
Ind. Residents	2	0	0	Steady	3.17	2.87	4,475	▲0.29
Green	0	0	0	Steady	0.00	0.26	405	New
Independent	0	0	0	Steady	0.00	0.16	252	▲0.02
National Front	0	0	0	Steady	0.00	0.11	168	New
Total	63						155,909	

== Ward results ==
(*) - Indicates an incumbent candidate

(†) - Indicates an incumbent candidate standing in a different ward

=== Canons ===
Canons (3)
Party	Candidate	Votes	%	±%
Conservative	John Cowan*	1,218	60.29	▲7.61
Conservative	Janet Cowan^{†} (Note: Cowan was a sitting councillor representing the Kenton West ward)	1,204		
Conservative	Richard Romain*	1,131		
Labour	Charles Blake	580	27.76	▲15.09
Labour	Benjamin Novick	575		
Labour	Kathleen Kurji	481		
Liberal Democrats	Ronald Warshaw	257	11.95	▼22.70
Liberal Democrats	David Sandford	237		
Liberal Democrats	Natoo Bhana	210		
Registered electors		6,472		▲249
Turnout		2,119	32.74	▼15.66
Rejected ballots		12	0.57	▲0.40
Conservative hold				
Conservative hold				
Conservative hold				

=== Centenary ===
Centenary (3)
Party	Candidate	Votes	%	±%
Labour	Mitzi Green	1,356	57.63	▲11.71
Labour	Daniel Redford*	1,312		
Labour	Keekira Thammaiah*	1,269		
Conservative	Frank Budden	816	33.58	▼6.65
Conservative	Manji Patel	781		
Conservative	Simon Pratt	697		
Liberal Democrats	Oenone Cox	219	8.78	▼5.06
Liberal Democrats	Sheila O'Reilly	201		
Liberal Democrats	Michael Fierstone	180		
Registered electors		6,906		▲228
Turnout		2,552	36.95	▼11.87
Rejected ballots		20	0.78	▲0.32
Labour hold				
Labour hold				
Labour hold				

=== Greenhill ===
Greenhill (3)
Party	Candidate	Votes	%	±%
Labour	Anastasia Attiki	937	40.55	▲10.66
Labour	Howard Bluston	921		
Labour	Damian Krushner	856		
Liberal Democrats	Maureen de Beer*	739	31.36	▼13.20
Liberal Democrats	Nahid Boethe*	685		
Conservative	Gary Hughes	685	28.09	▲2.54
Liberal Democrats	Peter Budden*	675		
Conservative	Henry Venour	601		
Conservative	Amrit Mediratta	594		
Registered electors		6,317		▲526
Turnout		2,426	38.40	▼12.71
Rejected ballots		10	0.41	▲0.07
Labour gain from Liberal Democrats				
Labour gain from Liberal Democrats				
Labour gain from Liberal Democrats				

=== Harrow on the Hill ===
Harrow on the Hill (3)
Party	Candidate	Votes	%	±%
Conservative	Eileen Kinnear*	1,087	36.86	▼4.88
Conservative	Clive Scowen*	1,051		
Labour	Huw Davies	1,022	34.25	▲12.29
Conservative	Mark Versallion	1,017		
Labour	Margaret Davine	992		
Labour	Chloe Smith	917		
Liberal Democrats	Judith Day	698	23.25	▼8.20
Liberal Democrats	Duncan Rogers* (Note: Rogers was originally elected as a Conservative but has since switched allegiance to the Liberal Democrats)	665		
Liberal Democrats	Vipin Varsani	627		
Green	Matthew Peace	161	5.64	New
Registered electors		7,746		▲429
Turnout		2,993	38.64	▼5.49
Rejected ballots		15	0.50	▲0.28
Conservative hold				
Conservative gain from Liberal Democrats				
Labour gain from Conservative				

=== Harrow Weald ===
Harrow Weald (3)
Party	Candidate	Votes	%	±%
Liberal Democrats	Patricia Lyne*	1,067	42.34	▼17.73
Liberal Democrats	Mary Graham*	1,019		
Liberal Democrats	Ahmed Marikar	870		
Labour	Colin Crouch	706	28.46	▼12.63
Conservative	Richard Cowan	693	29.20	▲5.10
Conservative	Gary Hunter	676		
Conservative	Brian Jones	670		
Labour	Michael Kinsey	653		
Labour	Patrick McManus	628		
Registered electors		7,658		▲164
Turnout		2,513	32.82	▼14.44
Rejected ballots		16	0.64	▲0.56
Liberal Democrats hold				
Liberal Democrats hold				
Liberal Democrats hold				

=== Hatch End ===
Hatch End (3)
Party	Candidate	Votes	%	±%
Conservative	Adrian Knowles	1,417	55.34	▲4.22
Conservative	Mary John*	1,382		
Conservative	Jean Lammiman*	1,342		
Labour	Susan Anderson	694	26.03	▲13.36
Labour	John Solomon	660		
Labour	Patricia Skacel	594		
Liberal Democrats	James Jackson	520	18.63	▼16.02
Liberal Democrats	Zia Baig	441		
Liberal Democrats	Paul Salter	433		
Registered electors		7,191		▲968
Turnout		2,691	37.42	▼10.98
Rejected ballots		13	0.48	▲0.31
Conservative hold				
Conservative hold				
Conservative hold				

=== Headstone North ===
Headstone North (3)
Party	Candidate	Votes	%	±%
Conservative	Anthony Seymour	1,218	40.42	▲0.26
Liberal Democrats	Nicola Lane*	1,208	39.17	▼5.22
Conservative	Eric Silver	1,195		
Conservative	Khalid Mahmood	1,171		
Liberal Democrats	Michael Sayer	1,166		
Liberal Democrats	Janet Skipworth*	1,149		
Labour	Ernest Selby	618	20.40	▲4.95
Labour	James Titmuss	600		
Labour	Sonalie Dharmarajah	591		
Registered electors		7,831		▼211
Turnout		3,184	40.66	▼13.11
Rejected ballots		15	0.47	▲0.37
Conservative gain from Liberal Democrats				
Liberal Democrats hold				
Conservative gain from Liberal Democrats				

=== Headstone South ===
Headstone South (3)
Party	Candidate	Votes	%	±%
Labour	Bill Stephenson	1,324	44.64	▲13.19
Labour	Gillian Travers	1,167		
Labour	Anne Whitehead	1,143		
Liberal Democrats	Stephen Giles-Medhurst*	922	31.29	▼15.76
Liberal Democrats	Clifford Thomas* (Note: Thomas was elected in a by-election triggered by the resignation of Cllr Derek Wiseman)	870		
Liberal Democrats	John Branch*	755		
Conservative	Stephen Hall	434	15.08	▼2.09
Conservative	Theresa Hyde	402		
Conservative	Richard Booth	391		
Green	Justin Challener	244	8.99	New
Registered electors		6,758		▲224
Turnout		2,693	39.85	▼10.55
Rejected ballots		23	0.85	▲0.73
Labour gain from Liberal Democrats				
Labour gain from Liberal Democrats				
Labour gain from Liberal Democrats				

=== Kenton East ===
Kenton East (3)
Party	Candidate	Votes	%	±%
Labour	Navin Shah*	1,404	63.10	▲1.25
Labour	Albert Toms*	1,308		
Labour	Archie Foulds	1,303		
Conservative	John Hall	507	21.09	▼3.43
Conservative	Edmund Costelloe	424		
Conservative	Jonathan Lemon	411		
Liberal Democrats	Mahendra Patel	404	15.81	▲2.18
Liberal Democrats	Barbara Angell	335		
Liberal Democrats	Paul Jeffery	267		
Registered electors		7,787		▲485
Turnout		2,461	31.60	▼13.50
Rejected ballots		12	0.49	▲0.16
Labour hold				
Labour hold				
Labour hold				

=== Kenton West ===
Kenton West (3)
Party	Candidate	Votes	%	±%
Labour	Cyril Davies^{†} (Note: Davies was a sitting councillor representing the Kenton East ward)	1,268	46.46	▲7.19
Labour	Raymond Frogley*	1,210		
Labour	Sanjay Dighé	1,194		
Conservative	Joseph Grenfell*	973	35.94	▼4.02
Conservative	Mayur Bhatt	959		
Conservative	Jeremy Zeid	908		
Liberal Democrats	Eileen Colledge	312	10.39	▼10.38
Liberal Democrats	Anthony Thorne	270		
Liberal Democrats	Gerald de Jayasinghe	239		
Independent	Akil Dhalla	190	7.21	New
Registered electors		7,952		▲267
Turnout		2,788	35.06	▼12.14
Rejected ballots		19	0.68	▲0.57
Labour gain from Conservative				
Labour hold				
Labour gain from Conservative				

=== Marlborough ===
Marlborough (3)
Party	Candidate	Votes	%	±%
Labour	Ann Groves*	1,226	52.19	▲11.72
Labour	Phillip O'Dell	1,131		
Labour	Margaret Sims	1,008		
Liberal Democrats	Brian Campbell*	714	31.47	▼9.45
Liberal Democrats	Stephen Campbell	662		
Liberal Democrats	Baldev Sharma	653		
Conservative	Peter Hardy	368	16.35	▼2.26
Conservative	Margaret Carr	360		
Conservative	Joyce Osborn	326		
Registered electors		6,989		▲524
Turnout		2,359	33.75	▼14.83
Rejected ballots		17	0.72	
Labour gain from Liberal Democrats				
Labour hold				
Labour gain from Liberal Democrats				

=== Pinner ===
Pinner (3)
Party	Candidate	Votes	%	±%
Conservative	Mavis Champagnie*	1,644	63.01	▲4.91
Conservative	Andrew Olins*	1,636		
Conservative	Anthony Cocksedge*	1,595		
Labour	Jeffrey Gallant	633	23.72	▲3.75
Labour	Timothy Oelman	616		
Labour	Michael Heavey	586		
Liberal Democrats	Leslie Moss	374	13.27	▼8.66
Liberal Democrats	Ian Green	346		
Liberal Democrats	Martin Land	307		
Registered electors		7,677		▲278
Turnout		2,748	35.80	▼9.56
Rejected ballots		15	0.55	▲0.37
Conservative hold				
Conservative hold				
Conservative hold				

=== Pinner West ===
Pinner West (3)
Party	Candidate	Votes	%	±%
Conservative	Charles Mote	1,461	47.74	▲6.58
Conservative	Graham Howard	1,434		
Conservative	John Nickolay	1,383		
Liberal Democrats	Veronica Chamberlain^{†} (Note: Chamberlain was a sitting councillor representing the Marlborough ward)	835	27.22	▼19.83
Liberal Democrats	Graham Finch*	816		
Labour	Joseph Lilley	795	25.04	▲13.25
Liberal Democrats	David Walster*	788		
Labour	Kenneth Moss	758		
Labour	Asoke Dutta	691		
Registered electors		7,206		▲80
Turnout		3,191	44.28	▼12.41
Rejected ballots		22	0.69	▲0.54
Conservative gain from Liberal Democrats				
Conservative gain from Liberal Democrats				
Conservative gain from Liberal Democrats				

=== Rayners Lane ===
Rayners Lane (3)
Party	Candidate	Votes	%	±%
Liberal Democrats	Christopher Noyce*	1,443	47.47	▼15.40
Liberal Democrats	Prakash Nandhra*	1,226		
Liberal Democrats	Alastair Alexander*	1,199		
Conservative	Herbert Crossman^{†} (Note: Crossman was a sitting councillor representing the Ridgeway ward)	819	28.92	▲5.60
Conservative	Raymond Arnold	775		
Conservative	Heather Murgett	762		
Labour	Rajeshri Shah	674	23.61	▲9.80
Labour	Sean Jinks	673		
Labour	Namachivaya Idaikkadar	577		
Registered electors		6,852		▲222
Turnout		2,872	41.91	▼11.32
Rejected ballots		9	0.31	▲0.17
Liberal Democrats hold				
Liberal Democrats hold				
Liberal Democrats hold				

=== Ridgeway ===
Ridgeway (3)
Party	Candidate	Votes	%	±%
Labour	Brian Gate* (Note: Gate was elected in a by-election triggered by the resignation of Cllr Andrew Wiseman in 1997)	1,283	42.51	▲18.06
Labour	Paul Fox^{†} (Note: Fox was a sitting councillor representing the Centenary ward)	1,147		
Labour	Norman Stillerman	1,067		
Liberal Democrats	Alanna Coombes	847	29.87	▼12.57
Conservative	Leonard Harsant	824	27.62	▼5.49
Liberal Democrats	Edward Tiley	819		
Liberal Democrats	Adrien Smith* (Note: Smith was elected in a by-election triggered by the resignation of Norah B. Murphy in 1995)	791		
Conservative	Paul Osborn	747		
Conservative	John Rennie	701		
Registered electors		7,102		▲228
Turnout		3,025	42.59	▼10.20
Rejected ballots		12	0.40	▲0.34
Labour gain from Liberal Democrats				
Labour gain from Liberal Democrats				
Labour hold				

=== Roxbourne ===
Roxbourne (3)
Party	Candidate	Votes	%	±%
Labour	Robert Currie	1,447	52.17	▼15.97
Labour	Manoharan Dharmarajah	1,381		
Labour	Mark Ingram	1,323		
Liberal Democrats	John Skipworth*	773	27.76	▼16.76
Liberal Democrats	Robert Prowse*	769		
Liberal Democrats	Ronald Smith	667		
Conservative	Stephen Dixon	576	20.07	▲0.78
Conservative	Lily Nickolay	546		
Conservative	Norman Stevenson	475		
Registered electors		7,611		▲333
Turnout		2,920	38.37	▼14.80
Rejected ballots		23	0.79	▲0.66
Labour gain from Liberal Democrats				
Labour gain from Liberal Democrats				
Labour gain from Liberal Democrats				

=== Roxeth ===
Roxeth (3)
Party	Candidate	Votes	%	±%
Ind. Residents	Charles Cox	1,540	49.97	▼1.05
Ind. Residents	John Cripps*	1,529		
Labour	Jeremy Miles* (Note: Miles was elected in a by-election triggered by the death of Cllr Alan Hamlin)	1,423	44.41	▲10.74
Ind. Residents	Christopher Hastie	1,406		
Labour	Michael Miller	1,318		
Labour	Michael Tushaw	1,236		
National Front	Gerald Hutchins	168	5.63	New
Registered electors		7,552		▲206
Turnout		3,193	42.28	▼6.90
Rejected ballots		15	0.47	▲0.28
Ind. Residents hold				
Ind. Residents hold				
Labour hold				

=== Stanmore Park ===
Stanmore Park (3)
Party	Candidate	Votes	%	±%
Conservative	Camilla Bath*	1,356	61.29	▲1.52
Conservative	Marilyn Ashton	1,346		
Conservative	Christine Bednell*	1,307		
Labour	Jeffrey Anderson	624	26.48	▲4.47
Labour	Connie Williams	555		
Labour	Vincent Masterson	553		
Liberal Democrats	Barry Harns	318	12.23	▼5.99
Liberal Democrats	Sylvia Warshaw	282		
Liberal Democrats	Marion Garner-Patel	200		
Registered electors		7,799		▲236
Turnout		2,362	30.29	▼10.43
Rejected ballots		18	0.76	▲0.63
Conservative hold				
Conservative hold				
Conservative hold				

=== Stanmore South ===
Stanmore South (3)
Party	Candidate	Votes	%	±%
Labour	Simon Brown*	1,479	62.09	▲4.41
Labour	Keith Burchell* (Note: Burchell was elected in a by-election triggered by the resignation of Cllr Tony McNulty)	1,418		
Labour	Robert Lawrence*	1,334		
Conservative	Jody Best	591	24.89	▼6.14
Conservative	Paul Lennon	591		
Conservative	Stewart Bolasco	514		
Liberal Democrats	Jaydeep Patel	369	13.02	▲1.73
Liberal Democrats	Susan Bartrick	294		
Liberal Democrats	Graham Lippiatt	224		
Registered electors		9,267		▲674
Turnout		2,688	29.01	▼18.12
Rejected ballots		31	1.15	▲0.93
Labour hold				
Labour hold				
Labour hold				

=== Wealdstone ===
Wealdstone (3)
Party	Candidate	Votes	%	±%
Labour	Cyril B. Harrison* (Note: Harrison was elected in a by-election triggered by the resignation of Cllr Gareth Thomas)	1,562	69.72	▲15.49
Labour	Ann Swalne*	1,439		
Labour	Robert Shannon*	1,421		
Conservative	Paul Stanley	389	14.93	▼5.64
Liberal Democrats	Norman Taylor	342	12.42	▼12.78
Conservative	Eleanor Zeid	335		
Liberal Democrats	Peter Fletcher	249		
Conservative	Rosamund Taylor	223		
Liberal Democrats	Kenneth Garraway	197		
Independent	Mohammed Taj	62	2.93	New
Registered electors		6,886		▲355
Turnout		2,270	32.97	▼13.96
Rejected ballots		19	0.84	▲0.61
Labour hold				
Labour hold				
Labour hold				

=== Wemborough ===
Wemborough (3)
Party	Candidate	Votes	%	±%
Liberal Democrats	Anne Diamond*	1,124	40.44	▼11.71
Liberal Democrats	Laurence Cox*	1,113		
Conservative	David Ashton	988	34.84	▲0.27
Liberal Democrats	Ranjit Ramsaran	863		
Conservative	Sherin Aminossehe	842		
Conservative	Keith Nelson-Tomsen	840		
Labour	Colin Gray	661	24.72	▲11.44
Labour	Alan Blann	642		
Labour	Nizam Ismail	592		
Registered electors		7,561		▲198
Turnout		2,798	37.01	▼13.96
Rejected ballots		17	0.61	▲0.42
Liberal Democrats hold				
Liberal Democrats hold				
Conservative gain from Liberal Democrats				
