= 1990 Harrow London Borough Council election =

1990 local election in England

- 3 May 1990

63 seats for election to Harrow London Borough Council 32 seats needed for a majority
- Registered: 147,203
- Turnout: 75,245, 51.12%

	First party	Second party
Party	Conservative	Labour
Seats before	32	9
Seats won	36	13
Seat change	▲4	▲4
Popular vote	99,825	58,302
Percentage	47.91%	27.98%
	Third party	Fourth party
Party	Liberal Democrats	Ind. Residents
Seats before	18	3
Seats won	11 (Note: Includes the results of candidates who ran under the Liberal Democratic Focus Team label)	3
Seat change	▼7	Steady
Popular vote	43,906	4,327
Percentage	21.07%	2.08%
	Fifth party
Party	Independent
Seats before	1
Seats won	0
Seat change	▼1
Popular vote	1,243
Percentage	0.60%
Council control before election
Conservative
Council control after election
Conservative

The 1990 Harrow Council election took place on 3 May 1990 to elect members of Harrow London Borough Council in London, England. The whole council was up for election and the Conservative party stayed in overall control of the council.

== Election result ==
1990 Harrow London Borough Council elections
Party	Seats	Gains	Losses	Net gain/loss	Seats %	Votes %	Votes	+/−
Conservative	36	4	0	▲4	57.14	47.91	99,825	
Labour	13	4	0	▲4	20.64	27.98	58,302	
Liberal Democrats	11	0	7	▼7	17.46	21.07	43,906	
Ind. Residents	3	0	0	Steady	4.76	2.08	4,327	
Independent	0	0	0	▼1	0.00	0.60	1,243	
Green	0	0	0	Steady	0.00	0.36	746	
Total	63						208,349	

== Ward results ==
(*) - represents an incumbent candidate

(†) - represents an incumbent candidate who is standing in a different ward

=== Canons ===
Canons (3)
Party	Candidate	Votes	%
Conservative	Ronald P. Grant*	2,247	68.43
Conservative	John H. Cowan*	2,220	
Conservative	Richard D. Romain*	2,089	
Labour	Peter Hamill	763	22.64
Labour	George W. Temple	709	
Labour	Dominic S.J. Snowdon	698	
Liberal Democrats	Jean E. Macklin	300	8.93
Liberal Democrats	David J. Weingott	291	
Liberal Democrats	Stephani S. Plester	263	
Registered electors		7,012	
Turnout		3,402	48.52
Rejected ballots		7	0.21
Conservative hold			
Conservative hold			
Conservative hold			

=== Centenary ===
Centenary (3)
Party	Candidate	Votes	%
Conservative	Adele L. Blakeley	1,953	59.24
Conservative	Paul J. Blakeley*	1,898	
Conservative	John A. Campbell*	1,835	
Labour	William T. Booroff	1,360	40.76
Labour	Janice L. Jaggers	1,290	
Labour	Keekira A. Thammaiah	1,261	
Registered electors		6,445	
Turnout		3,502	54.34
Rejected ballots		12	0.34
Conservative hold			
Conservative hold			
Conservative hold			

=== Greenhill ===
Greenhill (3)
Party	Candidate	Votes	%
Conservative	Leslie Nixon	1,053	36.95
Conservative	David C. Wesley-Rogers	1,010	
Conservative	Ernest J. Sailor	991	
Lib Dem Focus Team	John E.H Davies	951	33.94
Lib Dem Focus Team	Lala P. Das	942	
Lib Dem Focus Team	Brian G.T. Williams	913	
Labour	Norman Campbell	833	29.11
Labour	Anne J. Connell	821	
Labour	Alfred H. Elderton	753	
Registered electors		6,021	
Turnout		2,989	49.64
Rejected ballots		7	0.23
Conservative gain from Liberal Democrats			
Conservative gain from Liberal Democrats			
Conservative gain from Liberal Democrats			

=== Harrow on the Hill ===
Harrow on the Hill (3)
Party	Candidate	Votes	%
Conservative	Eileen M. Kinnear	1,899	53.81
Conservative	Duncan W. Rogers*	1,884	
Conservative	Clive R. Scowen	1,784	
Labour	Neil H. Rice	715	18.70
Labour	Eileen Samuroff	644	
Lib Dem Focus Team	Philip E. Mellor	623	17.45
Lib Dem Focus Team	Peter A. Fletcher	598	
Lib Dem Focus Team	Deanna J. Leboff	586	
Labour	Stephen R. Samuroff	576	
Green	Jennifer M. Hunt	346	10.03
Registered electors		7,182	
Turnout		3,433	47.80
Rejected ballots		2	0.06
Conservative hold			
Conservative hold			
Conservative hold			

=== Harrow Weald ===
Harrow Weald (3)
Party	Candidate	Votes	%
Liberal Democrats	Howard C. Cooper*	1,784	45.01
Liberal Democrats	Patricia M. Lyne	1,662	
Liberal Democrats	Andrew D. Wiseman*	1,635	
Conservative	Robert E. Goodman	1,422	36.90
Conservative	Michael J. Jacobson	1,389	
Conservative	Ernest J. Behde	1,356	
Labour	Rose J. Clifton	698	18.09
Labour	Victor Adeyeri	686	
Labour	Andrew D. Sharpe	660	
Registered electors		7,211	
Turnout		3,961	54.93
Rejected ballots		5	0.13
Liberal Democrats hold			
Liberal Democrats hold			
Liberal Democrats hold			

=== Hatch End ===
Hatch End (3)
Party	Candidate	Votes	%
Conservative	Donald Abbott*	2,336	65.22
Conservative	David Rhodes	2,234	
Conservative	Jonathan A. Kosky	2,205	
Labour	Ronald A. Fairhead	707	19.96
Labour	Avis I. Levene	695	
Labour	John Solomon	670	
Liberal Democrats	Ian C. Green	531	14.82
Liberal Democrats	James K. Jackson	531	
Liberal Democrats	Peter J. Thompson	478	
Registered electors		7,043	
Turnout		3,656	51.91
Rejected ballots		6	0.16
Conservative hold			
Conservative hold			
Conservative hold			

=== Headstone North ===
Headstone North (3)
Party	Candidate	Votes	%
Conservative	Jonathan J. Lemon	2,160	57.23
Conservative	Eric Silver	2,131	
Conservative	Arthur B.C. Turner^{†} (Note: Arthur originally was a councillor representing the Kenton West ward)	2,130	
Lib Dem Focus Team	Susan M. Bartrick	955	24.82
Lib Dem Focus Team	Eric A. Noyce	936	
Lib Dem Focus Team	Leslie N. Moss	894	
Labour	Muriel R. Lawrence	699	17.95
Labour	Robert M. Woodrow	659	
Labour	Radhikaranjan Ray	656	
Registered electors		7,437	
Turnout		3,900	52.44
Rejected ballots		10	0.26
Conservative hold			
Conservative hold			
Conservative hold			

=== Headstone South ===
Headstone South (3)
Party	Candidate	Votes	%
Lib Dem Focus Team	Stephen B.A.F.H Giles-Medhurst*	1,317	40.31
Lib Dem Focus Team	Derek R. Wiseman*	1,317	
Lib Dem Focus Team	John S.W. Branch	1,302	
Labour	Susan B. Buchanan	946	28.08
Labour	Susan T. Gray	913	
Labour	William Stephenson	884	
Conservative	Alan A. Brown	832	24.70
Conservative	John C. Hall	801	
Conservative	Stephen W.J. Hall	779	
Green	Neil Mabbs	225	6.91
Registered electors		6,733	
Turnout		3,319	49.29
Rejected ballots		2	0.06
Lib Dem Focus Team hold			
Lib Dem Focus Team hold			
Lib Dem Focus Team hold			

=== Kenton East ===
Kenton East (3)
Party	Candidate	Votes	%
Labour	Cyril Davies*	1,714	54.28
Labour	Albert K. Toms*	1,603	
Labour	Stanley H. Roan	1,573	
Conservative	John T.G. Hall	1,149	37.06
Conservative	Walter H.J. Harland	1,102	
Conservative	Ruth Topper	1,087	
Liberal Democrats	Stephen J. Grist	296	8.66
Liberal Democrats	Norman F. Taylor	260	
Liberal Democrats	Prem G. Warden	225	
Registered electors		7,283	
Turnout		3,257	44.72
Rejected ballots		8	0.25
Labour hold			
Labour hold			
Labour hold			

=== Kenton West ===
Kenton West (3)
Party	Candidate	Votes	%
Conservative	Janet R. Cowan	2,032	55.42
Conservative	Eric W.H. Feakins*	2,023	
Conservative	David M. Topper	1,941	
Labour	Jack A. Coulter	1,216	31.83
Labour	Ramanbhai J. Patel	1,128	
Labour	Jill Morsman	1,100	
Liberal Democrats	Eric J. Harris	501	12.75
Liberal Democrats	Lesley M. Thompson	463	
Liberal Democrats	Baldev K. Sharma	416	
Registered electors		7,643	
Turnout		3,947	51.64
Rejected ballots		4	0.10
Conservative hold			
Conservative hold			
Conservative hold			

=== Marlborough ===
Marlborough (3)
Party	Candidate	Votes	%
Labour	Ann T. Groves	1,216	38.63
Labour	Phillip W. O'Dell	1,128	
Labour	Pravinchandra Shah	1,117	
Lib Dem Focus Team	Brian K. Campbell	1,088	35.86
Lib Dem Focus Team	Veronica M. Chamberlain	1,077	
Lib Dem Focus Team	Laurence J. Cox	1,049	
Conservative	Stephen A. Jobson	783	25.51
Conservative	Elaine M. Shell	764	
Conservative	Paul L.R. Stanley	739	
Registered electors		6,573	
Turnout		3,269	49.73
Rejected ballots		6	0.18
Labour gain from Liberal Democrats			
Labour gain from Liberal Democrats			
Labour gain from Liberal Democrats			

=== Pinner ===
Pinner (3)
Party	Candidate	Votes	%
Conservative	Eric J.S. Hannam	2,306	48.78
Conservative	Mavis J. Champagnie*	2,276	
Conservative	Andrew R. Olins	2,140	
Independent	James S.S. Bond*	1,243	27.06
Labour	Frederick D. Flower	690	13.56
Labour	Anne T. O'Callaghan	595	
Labour	Frances M. Trott	585	
Liberal Democrats	Sonya Grist	506	10.60
Liberal Democrats	David J. Walster	467	
Registered electors		7,265	
Turnout		3,890	53.54
Rejected ballots		8	0.21
Conservative gain from Independent			
Conservative hold			
Conservative hold			

=== Pinner West ===
Pinner West (3)
Party	Candidate	Votes	%
Conservative	Derek B.I. Clark*	2,465	65.26
Conservative	Jean S. Clark*	2,426	
Conservative	Charles D. Green*	2,328	
Labour	Joseph T. Lilley	713	18.69
Labour	David W. Nash	691	
Labour	Anthony D. Scott	662	
Liberal Democrats	David Crawford	608	16.06
Liberal Democrats	Nigel G. Porter	587	
Liberal Democrats	Arthur H. Davis	582	
Registered electors		7,088	
Turnout		3,855	54.39
Rejected ballots		4	0.10
Conservative hold			
Conservative hold			
Conservative hold			

=== Rayners Lane ===
Rayners Lane (3)
Party	Candidate	Votes	%
Lib Dem Focus Team	Christopher D. Noyce*	2,092	53.49
Lib Dem Focus Team	Janet Skipworth	1,891	
Lib Dem Focus Team	Prakash K. Nandhra*	1,873	
Conservative	Michael W. McKersie	1,232	31.52
Conservative	Jaykant Jobanputra	1,139	
Conservative	Parthab Singh	1,078	
Labour	Ernest M. Selby	554	14.99
Labour	Stephen M. Willson	551	
Labour	Asoke K. Dutta	537	
Registered electors		6,822	
Turnout		3,865	56.65
Rejected ballots		5	0.13
Lib Dem Focus Team hold			
Lib Dem Focus Team hold			
Lib Dem Focus Team hold			

=== Ridgeway ===
Ridgeway (3)
Party	Candidate	Votes	%
Conservative	Leonard G.C. Harsant*	1,585	40.26
Conservative	Susan M. Searle*	1,570	
Conservative	Jane C.M. Swinton	1,466	
Lib Dem Focus Team	Maureen de Beer	1,327	32.32
Lib Dem Focus Team	Thrity A.J. Shroff	1,270	
Lib Dem Focus Team	Ronald D. Warshaw	1,111	
Labour	Colin J. Gray	806	20.52
Labour	Shamsul Alam	782	
Labour	Gillian Woodrow	768	
Green	Philip G. Tarver	264	6.90
Registered electors		6,583	
Turnout		3,797	57.68
Rejected ballots		0	0.0
Conservative hold			
Conservative hold			
Conservative hold			

=== Roxbourne ===
Roxbourne (3)
Party	Candidate	Votes	%
Lib Dem Focus Team	Susan Boobis	1,373	35.51
Lib Dem Focus Team	John C. Skipworth*	1,347	
Labour	Glyn Davies	1,328	33.78
Lib Dem Focus Team	Robert G. Prowse	1,296	
Labour	Alexander J. Bruce	1,272	
Labour	Huw S. Davies	1,223	
Conservative	John W. Nickolay	1,199	30.71
Conservative	Charles F. Gilliard	1,158	
Conservative	Dermot G. Glennon	1,116	
Registered electors		7,337	
Turnout		4,046	55.15
Rejected ballots		6	0.15
Lib Dem Focus Team hold			
Lib Dem Focus Team hold			
Labour hold			

=== Roxeth ===
Roxeth (3)
Party	Candidate	Votes	%
Ind. Residents	John E. Cripps*	1,492	41.11
Ind. Residents	Neville F. Hughes	1,425	
Ind. Residents	Alan W. Hamlin*	1,410	
Labour	Malcolm J. Campbell	1,265	34.09
Labour	Navin F. Shah	1,202	
Labour	Timothy Oelman	1,121	
Conservative	Roger J. Cantwell	909	24.80
Conservative	Paul Lecker	856	
Conservative	Norman S. Stevenson	844	
Registered electors		7,406	
Turnout		3,751	50.65
Rejected ballots		5	0.13
Ind. Residents hold			
Ind. Residents hold			
Ind. Residents hold			

=== Stanmore Park ===
Stanmore Park (3)
Party	Candidate	Votes	%
Conservative	Camilla M.A. Bath	2,292	65.77
Conservative	Maureen Geldman	2,232	
Conservative	Christine A. Bednell*	2,193	
Labour	Jonas Ferguson	712	20.01
Labour	Elizabeth Herbert	695	
Labour	Peter N. Tomsett	635	
Liberal Democrats	Anthony J. Noakes	350	9.08
Liberal Democrats	Margaret E, Warne	298	
Liberal Democrats	Jitendra Savani	280	
Green	Allon Schick-Maier	175	5.14
Registered electors		7,548	
Turnout		3,526	46.71
Rejected ballots		7	0.20
Conservative hold			
Conservative hold			
Conservative hold			

=== Stanmore South ===
Stanmore South (3)
Party	Candidate	Votes	%
Labour	Simon W. Brown*	1,710	55.31
Labour	Robert H. Lawrence*	1,592	
Labour	Anthony J. McNulty*	1,558	
Conservative	Nicholas J. Ball	1,099	36.94
Conservative	Stewart E. Bolasco	1,074	
Conservative	Edmond D.C. Camille	1,073	
Liberal Democrats	David R. Lerner	260	7.75
Liberal Democrats	Barbara M. Noyce	218	
Liberal Democrats	Carol S. Prowse	203	
Registered electors		6,735	
Turnout		3,248	48.23
Rejected ballots		15	0.46
Labour hold			
Labour hold			
Labour hold			

=== Wealdstone ===
Wealdstone (3)
Party	Candidate	Votes	%
Labour	Robert W.F. Shannon	1,410	47.81
Labour	Ann L. Swaine	1,392	
Labour	Gareth R. Thomas	1,336	
Conservative	Anne M. Jobson	948	31.59
Conservative	Joseph A. Hickmott	906	
Conservative	Dennis F. Orger	878	
Lib Dem Focus Team	Musarrat H. Akhtar	716	20.60
Lib Dem Focus Team	Malcolm L. Burton	544	
Lib Dem Focus Team	John S. Winter	523	
Registered electors		6,716	
Turnout		3,208	47.77
Rejected ballots		7	0.22
Labour hold			
Labour hold			
Labour gain from Lib Dem Focus Team			

=== Wemborough ===
Wemborough (3)
Party	Candidate	Votes	%
Conservative	Richard J. Denney*	2,270	70.47
Conservative	Phyllis P. Harkett*	2,260	
Conservative	John Goodwin	2,249	
Labour	Howard S. Bluston	967	29.53
Labour	Keith E. Snell	961	
Labour	William H. Spring	912	
Registered electors		7,120	
Turnout		3,424	48.09
Rejected ballots		11	0.32
Conservative hold			
Conservative hold			
Conservative hold			
