= Marlborough (ward) =

Electoral ward in London, England

- Electoral ward for the Harrow London Borough Council
- Marlborough ward boundaries since 2022
- Borough: Harrow
- County: Greater London
- Population: 11,990 (2021) (Note: 2021 Census data reported for 2022 ward boundaries)
- Electorate: 7,766 (2022)
- Major settlements: Harrow
- Area: 1.402 square kilometres (0.541 sq mi)

Current electoral ward
- Created: 1978
- Number of members: 3
- Councillors: David Perry; Varsha Parmar; Pamela Fitzpatrick
- GSS code: E05000296 (2002–2022); E05013553 (2022–present)

Marlborough is an electoral ward in the London Borough of Harrow. The ward was first used in the 1978 elections and elects three councillors to Harrow London Borough Council.

== List of councillors ==
Seat	Councillor	Took office	Left office	Party	Election
1	Barry Elliott	1978	1982	Labour	1978
2	Roger Curtis	1978	1982	Conservative	1978
3	Rosalind Elliott	1978	1982	Labour	1978
1	Ralph Bancroft	1982	1986	Alliance	1982
2	William Gardner	1982	1990	Alliance	1982, 1986
3	William Short	1982	1986	Alliance	1982
1	Marianne Lyons	1986	1990	Alliance	1986
3	Michael Hamill	1986	1990	Alliance	1986
1	Ann Groves	1990	2006	Labour	1990 ... 2002
2	Phillip O'Dell	1990	1994	Labour	1990
3	Pravinchandra Shah	1990	1994	Labour	1990
2	Veronica Chamberlain	1994	1998	Liberal Democrats	1994
3	Brian Campbell	1994	1998	Liberal Democrats	1994
2	Phillip O'Dell	1998	2006	Labour	1998, 2002
3	Margaret Sims	1998	2002	Labour	1998
3	Dhirajlal Lavingia	2002	2008	Labour	2002, 2006
1	David Gawn	2006	2010	Labour	2006
2	David Perry	2006	Incumbent	Labour	2006 ... 2022
3	Krishna James	2008	2014	Labour	2008, 2010
1	Varsha Parmar	2010	Incumbent	Labour	2010 ... 2022
3	Antonio Weiss	2014	2026	Labour	2014 ... 2022
3	Pamela Fitzpatrick	2026	Incumbent	Arise	2026

== Summary ==
Councillors elected by party at each general borough election.

- Labour
- Conservative
- Alliance
- Liberal Democrats
- Arise

== Harrow council elections since 2022 ==
There was a revision of ward boundaries in Harrow in 2022. Marlborough ward was significantly redrawn, with the loss of Wealdstone area in the northeast and the expansion in the southwest further into Harrow. Territory was gained from Greenhill and Headstone South wards and lost to Belmont and Wealdstone South.

=== 2026 election ===
The election took place on 7 May 2026.

2026 Harrow London Borough Council election: Marlborough (3)
Party	Candidate	Votes	%	±%
Labour	David Perry	900	30	
Arise	Pamela Fitzpatrick	878	30	
Labour	Varsha Parmar	848	30	
Labour	Asif Hussain	800	27	
Conservative	Joyce Osborn	760	27	
Conservative	Krish Sharma	731	24	
Conservative	Jaydeep Patel	724	24	
Arise	Sheila Guhadasan	722	24	
Arise	Asha Mohamed	660	21	
Green	Rowan Langley	654	21	
Reform	Mihaela Stroe	313	12	
Reform	Steve Watson	312	12	
Liberal Democrats	Paolo Arrigo	294	9	
Reform	Fathima Razick	238	9	
Turnout				
Labour hold		Swing		
Arise gain from Labour		Swing		
Labour hold		Swing		

=== 2022 election ===
The election took place on 5 May 2022.

2022 Harrow London Borough Council election: Marlborough (3)
Party	Candidate	Votes	%	±%
Labour	David Perry	1,172	50.0	
Labour	Varsha Parmar	1,134	48.4	
Labour	Antonio Weiss	1,095	46.7	
Conservative	Savitha Prakash	563	24.0	
Conservative	Jaydeep Patel	534	22.8	
Conservative	Dinesh Solanki	529	22.6	
Green	Lawrence Mathias	439	18.7	
Independent	Samantha Pali	401	17.1	
Independent	Edmond Bicari	356	15.2	
Liberal Democrats	Paolo Arrigo	320	13.6	
Independent	Nish Patel	256	10.9	
Liberal Democrats	David Al-Basha	236	10.1	
Turnout		2482	32	
Labour win (new boundaries)				
Labour win (new boundaries)				
Labour win (new boundaries)				

== 2002–2022 Harrow council elections ==
Marlborough ward boundaries from 2002 to 2022

There was a revision of ward boundaries in Harrow in 2002.

=== 2018 election ===
The election took place on 3 May 2018.

2018 Harrow London Borough Council election: Marlborough (3)
Party	Candidate	Votes	%	±%
Labour	David Perry	2,059	62.1	+11.9
Labour	Varsha Parmar	2,039	61.5	+12.5
Labour	Antonio Weiss	1,917	57.9	+13.8
Conservative	William Diffey	938	28.3	+0.2
Conservative	Pravin Seedher	872	26.3	+0.8
Conservative	Sukeshi Thakkar	783	23.6	+1.1
Green	Mark Baker	517	15.6	+2.1
Total votes				
Labour hold		Swing		
Labour hold		Swing		
Labour hold		Swing		

=== 2014 election ===
The election took place on 22 May 2014.

2014 Harrow London Borough Council election: Marlborough
Party	Candidate	Votes	%	±%
Labour	David Perry	1,648	50.2	+3.4
Labour	Varsha Parmar	1,611	49.0	+3.6
Labour	Antonio Weiss	1,448	44.1	−3.5
Conservative	Coral Dawkins	924	28.1	−0.5
Conservative	Mathilde Kaplan	837	25.5	−1.4
Conservative	Joel Musongela	738	22.5	−4.4
Green	Lawrence Mathias	442	13.5	N/A
Independent Labour	Rehana Khanum	441	13.4	N/A
Independent Labour	Noor Sultani	398	12.1	N/A
Independent Labour	Virginie James	349	10.6	N/A
Independent	Asif Iqbal	145	4.4	N/A
Turnout		3,286	37.3	
Labour hold		Swing		
Labour hold		Swing		
Labour hold		Swing		

=== 2010 election ===
The election on 6 May 2010 took place on the same day as the United Kingdom general election.

2010 Harrow London Borough Council election: Marlborough (3)
Party	Candidate	Votes	%	±%
Labour	Krishna James	2,458	47.6	
Labour	David Perry	2,419	46.8	
Labour	Varsha Parmar	2,346	45.4	
Conservative	Bharti Solanki	1,475	28.6	
Conservative	Edwin Solomon	1,392	26.9	
Conservative	Puja Solanki	1,391	26.9	
Liberal Democrats	Peter Budden	1,143	22.1	
Liberal Democrats	Jaydeep Patel	946	18.3	
Liberal Democrats	Ronald Warshaw	924	17.9	
Turnout		5,197	61.8	
Labour hold		Swing		
Labour hold		Swing		
Labour hold		Swing		

=== 2008 by-election ===
The by-election took place on 13 March 2008, following the death of Dhirajlal Lavingia.

2008 Marlborough by-election
Party	Candidate	Votes	%	±%
Labour	Krishna James	972	41.4	−2.1
Liberal Democrats	Peter Budden	628	26.7	+3.1
Conservative	Kamaljit Chana	507	21.6	−11.3
BNP	Howard Studley	97	4.1	+4.1
Independent	Herbert Crossman	74	3.2	+3.2
Green	Antony Rablen	71	3.0	+3.0
Majority		344	14.4	
Turnout		2,349	29.6	
Labour hold		Swing		

=== 2006 election ===
The election took place on 4 May 2006.

2006 Harrow London Borough Council election: Marlborough (3)
Party	Candidate	Votes	%	±%
Labour	Dhirajlal Lavingia	1,186	43.5	
Labour	David Gawn	1,169		
Labour	David Perry	1,044		
Conservative	Bharti Solanki	895	32.9	
Conservative	Michael McKersie	854		
Conservative	Dusko Grba	784		
Liberal Democrats	Chris Modi	643	23.6	
Liberal Democrats	Jaydeep Patel	625		
Liberal Democrats	Ronald Warshaw	607		
Turnout			38.0	
Labour hold		Swing		
Labour hold		Swing		
Labour hold		Swing		

=== 2002 election ===
The election took place on 2 May 2002.

2002 Harrow London Borough Council election: Marlborough (3)
Party	Candidate	Votes	%
Labour	Ann Groves	1,261	21.7
Labour	Dhirajlal Lavingia	1,189	20.3
Labour	Phillip O'Dell	1,178	19.2
Conservative	Joseph Grenfell	640	14.2
Conservative	Jonathan Lemon	599	12.6
Conservative	Paul Stanley	594	10.7
Total votes		5,461	100
Turnout			27.5
Labour win (new boundaries)			
Labour win (new boundaries)			
Labour win (new boundaries)			

== 1978–2002 Harrow council elections ==
Marlborough ward boundaries from 1978 to 2002

=== 1998 election ===
The election on 7 May 1998 took place on the same day as the 1998 Greater London Authority referendum.

1998 Harrow London Borough Council election: Marlborough (3)
Party	Candidate	Votes	%	±%
Labour	Ann Groves	1,226	52.19	▲11.72
Labour	Phillip O'Dell	1,131		
Labour	Margaret Sims	1,008		
Liberal Democrats	Brian Campbell	714	31.47	▼9.45
Liberal Democrats	Stephen Campbell	662		
Liberal Democrats	Baldev Sharma	653		
Conservative	Peter Hardy	368	16.35	▼2.26
Conservative	Margaret Carr	360		
Conservative	Joyce Osborn	326		
Registered electors		6,989		▲524
Turnout		2,359	33.75	▼14.83
Rejected ballots		17	0.72	
Labour gain from Liberal Democrats		Swing		
Labour hold		Swing		
Labour gain from Liberal Democrats		Swing		

=== 1994 election ===
The election took place on 5 May 1994.

1994 Harrow London Borough Council election: Marlborough (3)
Party	Candidate	Votes	%	±%
Liberal Democrats	Veronica Chamberlain	1,258	40.92	▲5.06
Labour	Ann Groves	1,248	40.47	▲1.84
Liberal Democrats	Brian Campbell	1,229		
Labour	Phillip O'Dell	1,172		
Labour	Pravin Shah	1,134		
Liberal Democrats	Baldev Sharma	1,107		
Conservative	Stephen Jobson	552	18.61	▼6.90
Conservative	Stephen Bye	551		
Conservative	Dennis Orger	531		
Registered electors		6,465		▼108
Turnout		3,141	48.58	▼1.15
Rejected ballots		4	0.13	▼0.05
Liberal Democrats gain from Labour		Swing		
Labour hold		Swing		
Liberal Democrats gain from Labour		Swing		

=== 1990 election ===
The election took place on 3 May 1990.

=== 1986 election ===
The election took place on 8 May 1986.

=== 1982 election ===
The election took place on 6 May 1982.

=== 1978 election ===
The election took place on 4 May 1978.
