= 2022 Harrow London Borough Council election =

2022 local election in Harrow

- 5 May 2022

All 55 seats to Harrow London Borough Council 28 seats needed for a majority
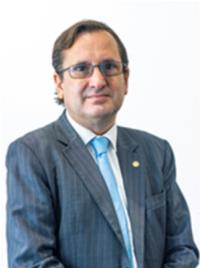
	First party	Second party
Leader	Paul Osborn	Graham Henson
Party	Conservative	Labour
Leader's seat	Pinner	Roxbourne
Last election	28 seats, 45.2%	35 seats, 46.6%
Seats before	28	34
Seats won	31	24
Seat change	▲3	▼11
Popular vote	83,261	71,893
Percentage	47.1%	40.7%
Swing	▲1.9 pp	▼5.9 pp
- Map of the results of the 2022 Harrow London Borough Council election. Conservatives in blue and Labour in red.
Leader before election
Graham Henson
Labour
Leader after election
Paul Osborn
Conservative

The 2022 Harrow London Borough Council election took place on 5 May 2022. All 55 members of Harrow London Borough Council were elected. The elections took place alongside local elections in the other London boroughs and elections to local authorities across the United Kingdom.

The 2022 election took place under new election boundaries, which reduced the number of councillors to 55. In the previous election in 2018, the Labour Party maintained its control of the council, winning 35 out of the 63 seats with the Conservative Party as the council opposition with the remaining 28 seats. However, in the 2022 elections, the Conservative Party won control from Labour with net gains of 8 seats to gain a total of 31 seats. This was the only council in London the Conservatives gained control of bucking the citywide trend with Labour gaining Barnet, Wandsworth and Westminster from the Conservatives.

== Background ==
=== History ===
Result of the 2018 borough election

The thirty-two London boroughs were established in 1965 by the London Government Act 1963. They are the principal authorities in Greater London and have responsibilities including education, housing, planning, highways, social services, libraries, recreation, waste, environmental health and revenue collection. Some of the powers are shared with the Greater London Authority, which also manages passenger transport, police and fire.

Since its formation, Harrow has been under Labour control, Conservative control and no overall control. The Labour Party most recently gained an overall majority on the council from no overall control in the 2014 election, winning 34 seats to the Conservatives' 26, with the Liberal Democrats winning one seat and independent candidates winning two. In the most recent election in 2018, Labour gained one seat to win 35 with 46.6% of the vote and the Conservatives gained two to win 28 seats with 45.1% of the vote. The Liberal Democrats received 6.4% of the vote across the borough and lost their only seat.

=== Council term ===
Shortly after the 2018 election, a Labour group annual general meeting elected Graham Henson as group leader, defeating the incumbent Sachin Shah. Henson consequently became leader of the council. The former Conservative leader of the council and councillor for Pinner South, Chris Mote, died in July 2021. Mote had been a councillor in Harrow since 1982. A by-election to replace him was held in October 2021. The by-election was held for the Conservatives by the businessperson Hitesh Karia, with the Liberal Democrat candidate coming in second place. A councillor for Headstone South, Pamela Fitzpatrick, was expelled from the Labour Party in November 2021, which she said was for speaking to the Socialist Appeal newspaper.

As with most London boroughs, Harrow was electing its councillors under new boundaries decided by the Local Government Boundary Commission for England, which it produced after a period of consultation. The number of councillors fell by eight to 55, representing eleven three-councillor wards and eleven two-councillor wards.

== Electoral process ==
Harrow, like other London borough councils, elects all of its councillors at once every four years. The previous election took place in 2018. The election took place by multi-member first-past-the-post voting, with each ward being represented by two or three councillors. Electors had as many votes as there are councillors to be elected in their ward, with the top two or three being elected.

All registered electors (British, Irish, Commonwealth and European Union citizens) living in London aged 18 or over were entitled to vote in the election. People who live at two addresses in different councils, such as university students with different term-time and holiday addresses, were entitled to be registered for and vote in elections in both local authorities. Voting in-person at polling stations took place from 7:00 to 22:00 on election day, and voters were able to apply for postal votes or proxy votes in advance of the election.

== Previous council composition ==
Council composition after the 2018 election

Council composition ahead of the 2022 election

After 2018 election		Before 2022 election	
Party	Seats	Party	Seats
Labour	35	Labour	34
Conservative	28	Conservative	28
		Independent	1

== Overall result ==
2022 Harrow Council election result
Party	Seats	Gains	Losses	Net gain/loss	Seats %	Votes %	Votes	+/−
Conservative	31	5		+3	56	47.1	83,261	+2.0
Labour	24		5	-11	44	40.7	71,893	-5.9
Liberal Democrats	0	0	0	0	0	6.3	11,207	-0.1
Green	0	0	0	0	0	3.3	5,800	+1.9
Independent	0	0	0	0	0	2.4	4,269	+2.0
Reform	0	0	0	0	0	0.2	411	New

Changes to 2018 election result

== Ward results ==
Belmont (2)
Party	Candidate	Votes	%	±%
Conservative	Anjana Patel*	1,720	62.5	
Conservative	Mina Parmar*	1,707	62.0	
Labour	Sue Anderson	843	30.6	
Labour	Kuldeep Mathur	716	26.0	
Green	Sunita Mehta	309	11.2	
Independent	Annie Kendall	211	7.7	
Turnout			42.1	
Conservative hold		Swing		
Conservative hold		Swing		

Canons (2)
Party	Candidate	Votes	%	±%
Conservative	Ameet Jogia*	1,679	69.1	
Conservative	Amir Moshenson*	1,490	61.3	
Labour	Sanjay Dighe	698	28.7	
Labour	Linda Lockie	673	27.7	
Liberal Democrats	James Bore	323	13.3	
Turnout			36.7	
Conservative hold		Swing		
Conservative hold		Swing		

Centenary (3)
Party	Candidate	Votes	%	±%
Conservative	Govind Bharadia	2,267	58.7	
Conservative	David Ashton	2,165	56.0	
Conservative	Salim Chowdhury	1,799	46.6	
Labour	Parvine Mawkin	1,523	39.4	
Labour	Brahma Mohanty	1,484	38.4	
Labour	Yusuf Yusuf	1,294	33.5	
Liberal Democrats	Nishi Karia	549	14.2	
Liberal Democrats	Laurence Cox	511	13.2	
Turnout			39.5	
Conservative win (new seat)				
Conservative win (new seat)				
Conservative win (new seat)				

Edgware (3)
Party	Candidate	Votes	%	±%
Conservative	Nicola Blackman	2,091	54.4	
Conservative	Yogesh Teli	1,934	50.3	
Labour	Nitin Parekh*	1,880	48.9	
Conservative	Stefan Voloseniuc	1,801	46.8	
Labour	James Lee*	1,752	45.5	
Labour	Angella Murphy-Strachan*	1,687	43.9	
Liberal Democrats	Steven Kuo	394	10.2	
Turnout			36.7	
Conservative gain from Labour		Swing		
Conservative gain from Labour		Swing		
Labour hold		Swing		

Greenhill (3)
Party	Candidate	Votes	%	±%
Labour	Dan Anderson*	1,115	48.5	
Labour	Ghazanfar Ali*	1,017	44.2	
Labour	Aneka Shah-Levy	1,009	43.9	
Conservative	Simon Dunkerley	852	37.0	
Conservative	Rhys Benjamin	841	36.6	
Conservative	Eileen Kinnear	800	34.8	
Green	Sonia Moore	401	17.4	
Liberal Democrats	Prakash Nandhra	337	14.7	
Liberal Democrats	Nahid Boethe	265	11.5	
Liberal Democrats	Lucy Tonge	263	11.4	
Turnout			29.8	
Labour hold		Swing		
Labour hold		Swing		
Labour hold		Swing		

Harrow on the Hill (2)
Party	Candidate	Votes	%	±%
Labour	Eden Kulig	1,261	46.1	
Labour	Stephen Hickman	1,260	46.1	
Conservative	Kiran Fothergill	1,208	44.2	
Conservative	Will Jackson	1,116	40.8	
Green	Soody Kim	325	11.9	
Liberal Democrats	Gaye Branch	296	10.8	
Turnout			39.1	
Labour hold		Swing		
Labour hold		Swing		

Harrow Weald (3)
Party	Candidate	Votes	%	±%
Conservative	Ramji Chauhan*	2,055	55.9	
Conservative	Pritesh Patel*	2,017	54.9	
Conservative	Stephen Greek*	1,989	54.1	
Labour	Sophie Green	1,318	35.9	
Labour	Tejinder Sharma	1,227	33.4	
Labour	Ahmed Ali-Ashghar	1,221	33.2	
Liberal Democrats	Valerie Taylor	437	11.9	
Liberal Democrats	Darren Diamond	395	10.7	
Liberal Democrats	Derek Hill	366	10.0	
Turnout			36.2	
Conservative hold		Swing		
Conservative hold		Swing		
Conservative hold		Swing		

Hatch End (2)
Party	Candidate	Votes	%	±%
Conservative	Susan Hall	1,629	59.0	
Conservative	Matthew Goodwin-Freeman	1,452	52.6	
Labour	Nimmi Patel	725	26.3	
Labour	Bill Stephenson	706	25.6	
Liberal Democrats	Sarah Ismail	406	14.7	
Green	Bhavna Roopram	395	14.3	
Reform	Ian Price	208	7.5	
Turnout		2846	40	
Conservative hold		Swing		
Conservative hold		Swing		

Headstone (3)
Party	Candidate	Votes	%	±%
Labour	Simon Brown	1,860	43.3	
Labour	Natasha Proctor	1,820	42.3	
Labour	Sasi Suresh	1,733	40.3	
Conservative	Lesline Lewinson	1352	31.5	
Conservative	Anthony Seymour	1302	30.3	
Conservative	Vijay Singh	1278	29.7	
Independent	Heshma Shah	796	18.5	
Independent	Geoffrey Eldridge	782	18.2	
Independent	Mary Turner	742	17.3	
Green	Adele Poskitt	499	11.6	
Liberal Democrats	Tony Levene	421	9.8	
Liberal Democrats	Pietro Rescia	311	7.2	
Turnout		4458	41	
Labour win (new seat)				
Labour win (new seat)				
Labour win (new seat)				

Kenton East (3)
Party	Candidate	Votes	%	±%
Conservative	Nitesh Hirani	2,695	65.7	
Conservative	Chetna Halai	2,498	60.9	
Conservative	Samir Sumaria	2,223	54.2	
Labour	Rohit Dixit	1650	40.3	
Labour	Manju Raghwani	1626	39.7	
Labour	Rangdatt Joshi	1605	39.2	
Turnout		4368	40	
Conservative hold		Swing		
Conservative gain from Labour		Swing		
Conservative hold		Swing		

Kenton West (2)
Party	Candidate	Votes	%	±%
Conservative	Vipin Mithani	1,701	54.9	
Conservative	Kanti Rabadia	1,635	52.7	
Labour	Ajay Maru	1300	41.9	
Labour	Meera Maru	1295	41.8	
Liberal Democrats	Charles Boethe	269	8.7	
Turnout		3181	44	
Conservative gain from Labour		Swing		
Conservative hold		Swing		

Marlborough (3)
Party	Candidate	Votes	%	±%
Labour	David Perry	1,172	50.0	
Labour	Varsha Parmar	1,134	48.4	
Labour	Antonio Weiss	1,095	46.7	
Conservative	Savitha Prakash	563	24.0	
Conservative	Jaydeep Patel	534	22.8	
Conservative	Dinesh Solanki	529	22.6	
Green	Lawrence Mathias	439	18.7	
Independent	Samantha Pali	401	17.1	
Independent	Edmond Bicari	356	15.2	
Liberal Democrats	Paolo Arrigo	320	13.6	
Independent	Nish Patel	256	10.9	
Liberal Democrats	David Al-Basha	236	10.1	
Turnout		2482	32	
Labour hold		Swing		
Labour hold		Swing		
Labour hold		Swing		

North Harrow (2)
Party	Candidate	Votes	%	±%
Conservative	Christopher Baxter	1,510	54.2	N/A
Conservative	Janet Mote	1,487	53.4	N/A
Labour	Hugh Brown	1482	53.2	N/A
Labour	Georgia Weston	1448	52.0	N/A
Green	Emma Wallace	331	11.9	N/A
Liberal Democrats	Marshel Amutharasan	255	9.2	N/A
Turnout		2,785	40.0	
Conservative win (new seat)				
Conservative win (new seat)				

Pinner (3)
Party	Candidate	Votes	%	±%
Conservative	Norman Stevenson	2,044	51.4	−2.5
Conservative	Kuha Kumaran	2,012	50.6	−2.7
Conservative	Paul Osborn	1,945	48.9	−1.1
Labour	Jeffrey Anderson	1,271	32.0	+6.4
Labour	James Lockie	1,104	27.8	+4.7
Labour	Lesley Stackpoole	1,077	27.1	+4.3
Liberal Democrats	Veronica Chamberlain	775	19.5	+6.0
Green	Krystel Lee	618	15.6	N/A
Liberal Democrats	Jacalina Bunce-Linsell	552	13.9	+1.7
Turnout		3,974	39.0	
Conservative hold		Swing		
Conservative hold		Swing		
Conservative hold		Swing		

Pinner South (3)
Party	Candidate	Votes	%	±%
Conservative	June Baxter	2,418	52.3	−8.1
Conservative	Hitesh Karia	2,305	49.8	−6.9
Conservative	Jean Lammiman	2,097	45.3	−11.2
Labour	Finley Harnett	1,728	37.4	+10.4
Labour	William Phillips	1,442	31.2	+4.8
Labour	Raj Vakesan	1,380	29.9	+4.4
Liberal Democrats	Sanjay Karia	865	18.7	+3.5
Green	Alexander Soon Lee	747	16.1	N/A
Reform	Zbigniew Kowalczyk	108	2.3	N/A
Turnout		4,626	41.0	
Conservative hold		Swing		
Conservative hold		Swing		
Conservative hold		Swing		

Rayners Lane (2)
Party	Candidate	Votes	%	±%
Labour	Krishna Suresh	1,399	44.1	+1.2
Conservative	Thaya Idaikkadar	977	30.8	+1.9
Labour	Tarza Sharif	962	30.3	−8.6
Conservative	Mala Morjaria	886	27.9	+0.0
Liberal Democrats	Chris Noyce	665	20.9	−15.9
Independent	Sockalingam Yogalingam	559	17.6	N/A
Liberal Democrats	Gerri Noyce	426	13.4	−14.7
Green	Rowan Langley	182	5.7	N/A
Independent	Herbie Crossman	166	5.2	N/A
Turnout		3,175	45.0	
Labour hold		Swing		
Conservative gain from Labour		Swing		

Roxbourne (2)
Party	Candidate	Votes	%	±%
Labour	Graham Henson	1,446	65.2	
Labour	Maxine Henson	1,369	61.7	
Conservative	Arunasalam Rajalingam	764	34.4	
Conservative	John Hinkley	687	31.0	
Liberal Democrats	Thomas Yasin	170	7.7	
Turnout		2306	33	
Labour hold		Swing		
Labour hold		Swing		

Roxeth (3)
Party	Candidate	Votes	%	±%
Labour	Jerry Miles	2,180	60.8	
Labour	Peymana Assad	2,009	56.0	
Labour	Rashmi Kalu	1,991	55.5	
Conservative	Rajagopal Deleepan	1422	39.6	
Conservative	Sockalingam Karunalingam	1364	38.0	
Conservative	Subankani Pratheepan	1242	34.6	
Green	Swati Patel	553	15.4	
Turnout		3881	35	
Labour hold		Swing		
Labour hold		Swing		
Labour hold		Swing		

Stanmore (3)
Party	Candidate	Votes	%	±%
Conservative	Marilyn Ashton	2,340	66.8	
Conservative	Philip Benjamin	2,244	64.0	
Conservative	Zak Wagman	1,992	56.8	
Labour	Hannah Gibbons	852	24.3	
Labour	Navin Shah	803	22.9	
Labour	Jeffrey Gallant	784	22.4	
Liberal Democrats	Nikki Kopelman	392	11.2	
Green	Linda Robinson	356	10.2	
Liberal Democrats	Philip Levy	330	9.4	
Liberal Democrats	Sheila Levy	327	9.3	
Reform	Howard Koch	95	2.7	
Turnout		3653	36	
Conservative win (new seat)				
Conservative win (new seat)				
Conservative win (new seat)				

Wealdstone North (2)
Party	Candidate	Votes	%	±%
Labour	Shahania Choudhury	1,405	65.2	
Labour	Phillip O'Dell	1,361	63.1	
Conservative	Vinod Tikoo	781	36.2	
Conservative	Paul Greek	766	35.5	
Turnout		2266	33	
Labour win (new seat)				
Labour win (new seat)				

Wealdstone South (2)
Party	Candidate	Votes	%	±%
Labour	Kandy Dolor	888	54.8	
Labour	Dean Gilligan	847	52.3	
Conservative	Manjibhai Kara	661	40.8	
Conservative	Naresh Gothadiya	635	39.2	
Green	Halema Khatun	208	12.8	
Turnout		1680	33	
Labour win (new seat)				
Labour win (new seat)				

4

West Harrow (2)
Party	Candidate	Votes	%	±%
Labour	Rekha Shah	1,507	54.7	
Labour	Asif Hussain	1,459	52.9	
Conservative	Luke Wilson	911	33.0	
Conservative	Caroline Ojo	849	30.8	
Green	Monika Sobiecki	437	15.9	
Liberal Democrats	Em Dean	351	12.7	
Turnout		2841	40	
Labour hold		Swing		
Labour hold		Swing		

== Changes 2022–2026 ==
- Phillip O'Dell, elected for Labour, was suspended from the party in June 2023 and subsequently listed as an independent.
