= Greenhill, Harrow =

Coordinates: 51.5839°N 0.3336°W

Greenhill
- Location within Greater London
- Population: 12,420 (2011 Census. Ward)
- OS grid reference: TQ155885
- London borough: Harrow
- Ceremonial county: Greater London
- Region: London
- Country: England
- Sovereign state: United Kingdom
- Post town: HARROW
- Postcode district: HA1
- Dialling code: 020
- Police: Metropolitan
- Fire: London
- Ambulance: London
- UK Parliament: Harrow West
- London Assembly: Brent and Harrow

Greenhill is a district of Harrow. It was an ecclesiastical parish with similar but not identical boundaries in the London Borough of Harrow.

== Parish ==
The parish church (dedicated to St John the Baptist) is at the junction of Station Road and Sheepcote Road. The parish war memorial for the Second World War is outside the church, but the names (and the First World War memorial) are inside the church.

== Geography ==
The 2001 ward boundary is mostly contained to the east by the railway between Kenton station and The Bridge, Wealdstone; from there to Lower Mead (including Tesco/the previous location of Wealdstone Football Club); from there westward along Hindes Road to the junction with Roxborough Road; from there to the roundabouts above the Underground railway at the West end of College Road; from there along Bessborough Road to the NW corner of the cricket ground opposite Whitmore Road; from there along the footpath leading toward St Mary's church to where it meets the footpath continuing from Roxborough Park; from there to the Southern end of (the road named) Roxborough Park; from there to the SE corner of The Grove Open Space; from there to the junction of Lowlands Road and Tyburn Lane; from there along Tyburn Lane and Kenton Road to Kenton Station.

It does not include the Harrow parish church dedicated to St. Mary or the greater part of Harrow Hill; these are within the Harrow on the Hill ward.

The recent resident population figures are:-

1991: 7,876
2001: 9,324

== Locality ==
The locality derives its name from the hollow (which has been built over from the 19th century) to the north of Harrow Hill. It was not recorded in the Domesday Book but was mentioned as early as 1334 as "Grenehulle". In addition, one or more families bearing the "Greenhulle" or "Greenhill" surname lived there from at least 1247, and are likely to have taken their name from this location.

Greenhill is not often recognised by visitors or incomers but is practically regarded as the main shopping area of Harrow between the bottom of Harrow Hill and Wealdstone. The local council has continued the name by using it for "Greenhill Way" a new road which by-passes the mainly-pedestrianised and modernised shopping area based around College Road and St. Anns Road.

== Politics ==
Greenhill is part of the Harrow West constituency for elections to the House of Commons of the United Kingdom.

Greenhill is part of the Greenhill ward for elections to Harrow London Borough Council.
