= Roxbourne =

Coordinates: 51.574936°N 0.382424°W

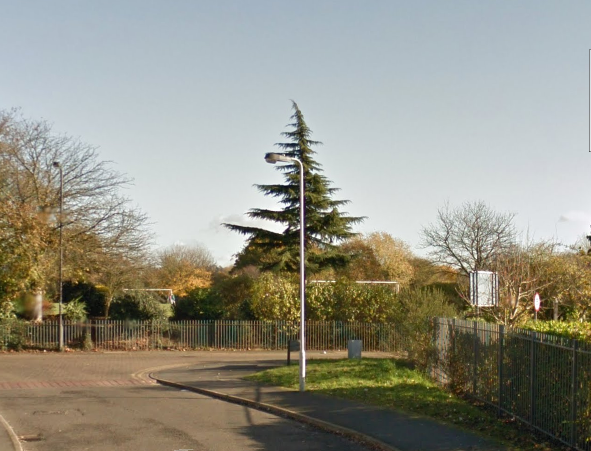
- Roxbourne Park West boundary line.

- Location within Greater London
- Population: 12,828 (2011 Census. Ward)
- OS grid reference: TQ128873
- London borough: Harrow
- Ceremonial county: Greater London
- Region: London
- Country: England
- Sovereign state: United Kingdom
- Post town: HARROW
- Postcode district: HA2
- Post town: PINNER
- Postcode district: HA5
- Dialling code: 020
- Police: Metropolitan
- Fire: London
- Ambulance: London
- UK Parliament: Harrow West
- London Assembly: Brent and Harrow

Roxbourne is a suburb in the London Borough of Harrow, located west of Rayners Lane in the north west of Greater London (being in the county of Middlesex before its inclusion in Greater London in 1965). Historically s a hamlet, it now includes the Yeading Brook and Roxbourne Park which provides 26 hectares of open space including football and cricket facilities; the Roxbourne Rough Nature Reserve, enriched with wildlife; and the Roxbourne (miniature) Railway.

== Social Structure ==
The first census in 1801 simply divided people into those employed in agriculture and those in trade or manufacturing, and the 1841 census, the first to gather detailed occupational data, imposed no real order on it at all. However, the first occupational classification, introduced in 1851, was clearly concerned with social status as well as with what people made: it began with the Queen, followed by government officials and then by 'the learned professions'.

== Politics ==
Roxbourne is part of the Harrow West constituency for elections to the House of Commons of the United Kingdom.

Roxbourne is part of the Roxbourne ward for elections to Harrow London Borough Council.
