= Edgware (Harrow ward) =

Electoral ward in London, England

- Electoral ward for the Harrow London Borough Council
- Borough: Harrow
- County: Greater London
- Population: 15,713 (2021)
- Major settlements: Edgware
- Area: 1.655 km²

Current electoral ward
- Created: 2002
- Seats: 3

Edgware is an electoral ward in the London Borough of Harrow. The ward was first used in the 2002 elections and elects two councillors to Harrow London Borough Council.

== Geography ==
The ward is named after the town of Edgware.

== Councillors ==
Election	Councillors		
2022	Nicola Blackman (Conservative)	Nitin Parekh (Labour)	Yogesh Teli (Conservative)

== Elections ==
=== 2022 ===
Edgware (3)
Party	Candidate	Votes	%	±%
Conservative	Nicola Blackman	2,091	54.4	
Conservative	Yogesh Teli	1,934	50.3	
Labour	Nitin Parekh*	1,880	48.9	
Conservative	Stefan Voloseniuc	1,801	46.8	
Labour	James Lee*	1,752	45.5	
Labour	Angella Murphy-Strachan*	1,687	43.9	
Liberal Democrats	Steven Kuo	394	10.2	
Turnout			36.7	
Conservative gain from Labour		Swing		
Conservative gain from Labour		Swing		
Labour hold		Swing		

== See also ==
- List of electoral wards in Greater London
