= Headstone (ward) =

Electoral ward in London, England

- Electoral ward for the Harrow London Borough Council
- Borough: Harrow
- County: Greater London
- Population: 14,882 (2021)
- Major settlements: Headstone, London
- Area: 3.146 km²

Current electoral ward
- Created: 2022
- Seats: 3
- Created from: Headstone North, Headstone South

Headstone is an electoral ward in the London Borough of Harrow. The ward was first used in the 2022 elections and elects three councillors to Harrow London Borough Council.

== Geography ==
The ward is named after the suburb of Headstone, London.

== Councillors ==
Election	Councillors		
2022	Simon Brown (Labour)	Natasha Proctor (Labour)	Sasi Suresh (Labour)

== Elections ==
=== 2022 ===
Headstone (3)
Party	Candidate	Votes	%	±%
Labour	Simon Brown	1,860	43.3	
Labour	Natasha Proctor	1,820	42.3	
Labour	Sasi Suresh	1,733	40.3	
Conservative	Lesline Patricia Lewinson	1352	31.5	
Conservative	Anthony Harry Seymour	1302	30.3	
Conservative	Vijay Yeshwanth Singh	1278	29.7	
Independent	Heshma Shah	796	18.5	
Independent	Geoffrey Peter Eldridge	782	18.2	
Independent	Mary Ellen Turner	742	17.3	
Green	Adele Poskitt	499	11.6	
Liberal Democrats	Tony Levene	421	9.8	
Liberal Democrats	Pietro Rescia	311	7.2	
Turnout		4458	41	
Labour win (new seat)				
Labour win (new seat)				
Labour win (new seat)				

== See also ==
- List of electoral wards in Greater London
