= Stanmore (ward) =

Electoral ward in London, England

- Electoral ward for the Harrow London Borough Council
- Borough: Harrow
- County: Greater London
- Population: 13,501 (2021)
- Major settlements: Stanmore
- Area: 7.470 km²

Current electoral ward
- Created: 2022
- Seats: 3
- Created from: Stanmore Park

Stanmore is an electoral ward in the London Borough of Harrow. The ward was first used in the 2022 elections and elects three councillors to Harrow London Borough Council.

== Geography ==
The ward is named after the suburb of Stanmore.

== Councillors ==
Election	Councillors		
2022	Marilyn Ashton (Conservative)	Philip Benjamin (Conservative)	Zak Wagman (Conservative)

== Elections ==
=== 2022 ===
Stanmore (3)
Party	Candidate	Votes	%	±%
Conservative	Marilyn Joy Ashton	2,340	66.8	
Conservative	Philip Richard Benjamin	2,244	64.0	
Conservative	Zak Oliver Wagman	1,992	56.8	
Labour	Hannah Louise Gibbons	852	24.3	
Labour	Navin Shah	803	22.9	
Labour	Jeffrey Charles Gallant	784	22.4	
Liberal Democrats	Nikki Kopelman	392	11.2	
Green	Linda Carol Robinson	356	10.2	
Liberal Democrats	Philip Grenville Levy	330	9.4	
Liberal Democrats	Sheila Michelle Levy	327	9.3	
Reform	Howard Keith Koch	95	2.7	
Turnout		3653	36	
Conservative win (new seat)				
Conservative win (new seat)				
Conservative win (new seat)				

== See also ==
- List of electoral wards in Greater London
