= Belmont (Harrow ward) =

Electoral ward in London, England

- Electoral ward for the Harrow London Borough Council
- Borough: Harrow
- County: Greater London
- Population: 9,021 (2021)
- Major settlements: Belmont, Harrow
- Area: 1.519 km²

Current electoral ward
- Created: 1965, 2002
- Councillors: 2 (since 2022); 3 (1965-1974) (2002-2022)

Belmont is an electoral ward in the London Borough of Harrow. Begun as a three-councillor ward, its first use in its current (second) creation was for the 2002 elections (to elect councillors to Harrow London Borough Council); since 2022 its has been a two-councillor division (ward) as other wards have had greater housing and population growth. Belmont also refers to its indirect successor, a ward of three councillors which spanned April 1965 to May 1974.

== Geography ==
The ward is named after the suburb of Belmont, Harrow.

== Councillors ==
Election	Councillors	
2022	Mina Parmar (Conservative)	Anjana Patel (Conservative)
2026	Mina Parmar (Conservative)	Anjana Patel (Conservative)

== Elections ==
=== 2022 ===
Belmont (2 councillors)
Party	Candidate	Votes	%	±%
Conservative	Anjana Patel* (Note: (nominal hold, based on an approximation of predecessor ward overlap with this new ward, and personally for the councillor up for re-election,))	1,720	62.5	
Conservative	Mina Parmar* (Note: (nominal hold as above))	1,707	62.0	
Labour	Sue Anderson	843	30.6	
Labour	Kuldeep Mathur	716	26.0	
Green	Sunita Mehta	309	11.2	
Independent	Annie Kendall	211	7.7	
Turnout			42.1	
Conservative hold		Swing		
Conservative hold		Swing		

=== 2026 ===
Belmont (2)
Party	Candidate	Votes	%	±%
Conservative	Anjana Patel*	1,845	33	
Conservative	Mina Parmar*	1,679	30	
Green (E&W)	Soody Kim	385	7	
Labour	Navin Shah	383	7	
Green (E&W)	Sunita Mehta	380	7	
Reform	Keval Radia	294	5	
Labour	Yogeshwar C. Vasdev	286	5	
Reform	Fathima F. M. Farzan	217	5	
Liberal Democrats	Colin J. Webber	198	3	
Turnout		5,667	45	+2.9%
Conservative hold		Swing		
Conservative hold		Swing		

== See also ==
- List of electoral wards in Greater London
