= Hatch End (ward) =

Electoral ward in the London Borough of Harrow

- Electoral ward for the Harrow London Borough Council
- Hatch End ward boundaries since 2022
- Borough: Harrow
- County: Greater London
- Population: 9,822 (2021) (Note: 2021 Census data reported for 2022 ward boundaries)
- Electorate: 7,140 (2022)
- Major settlements: Hatch End
- Area: 3.047 square kilometres (1.176 sq mi)

Current electoral ward
- Created: 1978
- Councillors: 1978–2022: 3; 2022–present: 2
- GSS code: E05000291 (2002–2022); E05013549 (2022–present)

Hatch End is an electoral ward in the London Borough of Harrow. The ward was first used in the 1978 elections. It returns councillors to Harrow London Borough Council.

== Harrow council elections since 2022 ==
There was a revision of ward boundaries in Harrow in 2022.

=== 2022 election ===
The election took place on 5 May 2022.

2022 Harrow London Borough Council election: Hatch End (2)
| Party | Candidate | Votes | % | ±% |
|---|---|---|---|---|
| Conservative | Susan Hall | 1,629 | 59.0 | |
| Conservative | Matthew Goodwin-Freeman | 1,452 | 52.6 | |
| Labour | Nimmi Patel | 725 | 26.3 | |
| Labour | Bill Stephenson | 706 | 25.6 | |
| Liberal Democrats | Sarah Ismail | 406 | 14.7 | |
| Green | Bhavna Roopram | 395 | 14.3 | |
| Reform UK | Ian Price | 208 | 7.5 | |
| Turnout | | 2846 | 40 | |
| Conservative win (new boundaries) | | | | |
| Conservative win (new boundaries) | | | | |

== 2002–2022 Harrow council elections ==
Hatch End ward boundaries from 2002 to 2022

There was a revision of ward boundaries in Harrow in 2002.

=== 2018 election ===
The election took place on 3 May 2018.

2018 Harrow London Borough Council election: Hatch End (3)
| Party | Candidate | Votes | % | ±% |
|---|---|---|---|---|
| Conservative | Susan Hall | 2,236 | 66.7 | |
| Conservative | John Hinkley | 2,035 | 60.7 | |
| Conservative | Jean Lammiman | 2,017 | 60.2 | |
| Labour | Stephen Hickman | 978 | 29.2 | |
| Labour | Bill Stephenson | 807 | 24.1 | |
| Labour | Adam Shabbir | 803 | 24.0 | |
| Liberal Democrats | John Bryant | 346 | 10.3 | |
| Liberal Democrats | Nana Adjepong | 278 | 8.3 | |
| Total votes | | | | |
| Conservative hold | | Swing | | |
| Conservative hold | | Swing | | |
| Conservative hold | | Swing | | |

=== 2014 election ===
The election took place on 22 May 2014.

2014 Harrow London Borough Council election: Hatch End (3)
| Party | Candidate | Votes | % | ±% |
|---|---|---|---|---|
| Conservative | Susan Hall | 2,014 | | |
| Conservative | John Hinkley | 1,697 | | |
| Conservative | Jean Lammiman | 1,696 | | |
| Labour | Samir Juthani | 909 | | |
| Labour | Matthew Lloyd | 851 | | |
| Labour | Bill Stephenson | 796 | | |
| UKIP | Stanley Sheinwald | 609 | | |
| Liberal Democrats | Bhupinder Nandhra | 321 | | |
| Independent Labour | Brian Ley | 159 | | |
| Total votes | | | | |
| Conservative hold | | Swing | | |
| Conservative hold | | Swing | | |
| Conservative hold | | Swing | | |

=== 2010 election ===
The election on 6 May 2010 took place on the same day as the United Kingdom general election.

2010 Harrow London Borough Council election: Hatch End (3)
| Party | Candidate | Votes | % | ±% |
|---|---|---|---|---|
| Conservative | Susan Hall | 3,602 | 63.1 | |
| Conservative | Jean Lammiman | 3,316 | | |
| Conservative | Stanley Sheinwald | 3,099 | | |
| Labour | Jeffrey Anderson | 1,649 | 28.9 | |
| Labour | Michael Boria | 1,634 | | |
| Labour | John Solomon | 1,579 | | |
| Independent | Joan Langrognat | 460 | 8.1 | |
| Turnout | | 5,712 | 70 | |
| Conservative hold | | Swing | | |
| Conservative hold | | Swing | | |
| Conservative hold | | Swing | | |

=== 2006 election ===
The election took place on 4 May 2006.

2006 Harrow London Borough Council election: Hatch End (3)
| Party | Candidate | Votes | % | ±% |
|---|---|---|---|---|
| Conservative | Susan Hall | 2,268 | 67.2 | |
| Conservative | Jean Lammiman | 2,190 | | |
| Conservative | Stanley Sheinwald | 2,129 | | |
| Labour | Susan Anderson | 651 | 19.3 | |
| Labour | John Solomon | 591 | | |
| Labour | Timothy Oelman | 587 | | |
| Liberal Democrats | Eileen Colledge | 455 | 13.5 | |
| Liberal Democrats | Alfred Colledge | 427 | | |
| Liberal Democrats | Joan Langrognat | 409 | | |
| Turnout | | | 42.8 | |
| Conservative hold | | Swing | | |
| Conservative hold | | Swing | | |
| Conservative hold | | Swing | | |

=== 2002 election ===
The election took place on 2 May 2002.

2002 Harrow London Borough Council election: Hatch End (3)
| Party | Candidate | Votes | % |
|---|---|---|---|
| Conservative | Mary John | 1,641 | 24.3 |
| Conservative | Adrian Knowles | 1,598 | 23.6 |
| Conservative | Jean Lammiman | 1,585 | 23.4 |
| Labour | Susan Anderson | 663 | 9.8 |
| Labour | John Solomon | 9.4 | 14.5 |
| Labour | Patricia Rogers | 628 | 9.3 |
| Total votes | | 6,750 | 100 |
| Turnout | | | 30.8 |
| Conservative win (new boundaries) | | | |
| Conservative win (new boundaries) | | | |
| Conservative win (new boundaries) | | | |

== 1978–2002 Harrow council elections ==
Hatch End ward boundaries from 1978 to 2002

=== 1998 election ===
The election took place on 7 May 1998.

1998 Harrow London Borough Council election: Hatch End (3)
| Party | Candidate | Votes | % |
|---|---|---|---|
| Conservative | Adrian Knowles | 1,417 | 18.9 |
| Conservative | Mary John | 1,382 | 18.4 |
| Conservative | Jean Lammiman | 1,342 | 17.9 |
| Labour | Susan Anderson | 694 | 9.2 |
| Labour | John Solomon | 660 | 8.8 |
| Labour | Patricia Skacel | 594 | 7.9 |
| Liberal Democrats | James Jackson | 520 | 6.9 |
| Liberal Democrats | Zia Baig | 441 | 5.8 |
| Liberal Democrats | Paul Salter | 433 | 5.7 |
| Total votes | | 7,483 | 100 |
| Turnout | | | 37.4 |

=== 1994 election ===
The election took place on 5 May 1994.

=== 1990 election ===
The election took place on 3 May 1990.

1990 Harrow London Borough Council election: Hatch End (3)
| Party | Candidate | Votes | % |
|---|---|---|---|
| Conservative | Donald Abbott | 2,336 | 65.22 |
| Conservative | David Rhodes | 2,234 | |
| Conservative | Jonathan Kosky | 2,205 | |
| Labour | Ronald Fairhead | 707 | 19.96 |
| Labour | Avis Levene | 695 | |
| Labour | John Solomon | 670 | |
| Liberal Democrats | Ian Green | 531 | 14.82 |
| Liberal Democrats | James Jackson | 531 | |
| Liberal Democrats | Peter Thompson | 478 | |
| Registered electors | | 7,043 | |
| Turnout | | 3,656 | 51.91 |
| Rejected ballots | | 6 | 0.16 |
| Conservative hold | | | |
| Conservative hold | | | |
| Conservative hold | | | |

=== 1986 election ===
The election took place on 8 May 1986.

=== 1982 election ===
The election took place on 6 May 1982.

=== 1978 election ===
The election took place on 4 May 1978.
