= Susan Hall =

British politician (born 1955)

Cllr Susan Hall AM
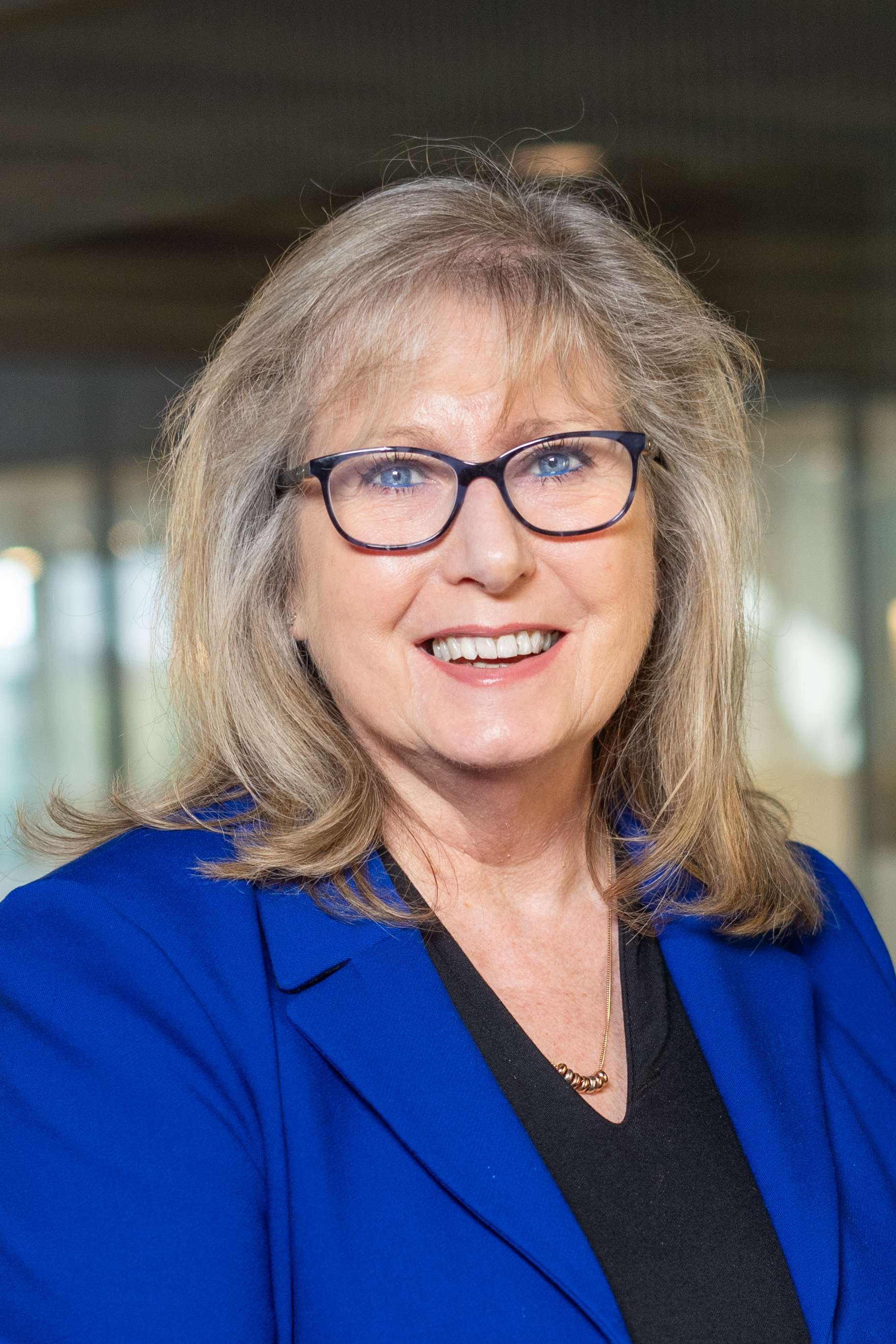
- Hall in 2023

Leader of the Conservative Party in the London Assembly
- Incumbent
- Assumed office 2 May 2025
- Deputy: Emma Best
- Preceded by: Neil Garratt
- In office 17 December 2019 – 2 May 2023
- Deputy: Peter Fortune
- Preceded by: Gareth Bacon
- Succeeded by: Neil Garratt

Member of the London Assembly as an additional member
- Incumbent
- Assumed office 20 June 2017
- Preceded by: Kemi Badenoch

Leader of Harrow Council
- In office 16 September 2013 – 22 May 2014
- Preceded by: Thaya Idaikkadar
- Succeeded by: David Perry

Leader of the Conservative group in Harrow Council
- In office 6 May 2010 – 31 August 2017
- Deputy: Barry Macleod-Cullinane
- Preceded by: David Ashton
- Succeeded by: Paul Osborn

Member of Harrow Council for Hatch End
- Incumbent
- Assumed office 4 May 2006
- Preceded by: Mary John

Personal details
- Born: Susan Mary Cole; March 1955 (age 71) Willesden, Middlesex, England
- Party: Conservative
- Other political affiliations: Restore Britain (2025-2026)
- Spouse: Gerald Peter Hall (m. 1977, divorced)
- Children: 2
- Education: Roxeth Manor Secondary Modern School
- Susan Hall's voice Hall on why she became an Assembly Member; Recorded 21 September 2018

Susan Mary Hall (née Cole; born March 1955) is a British politician. A member of the London Assembly since 2017, she has served as Leader of the London Conservatives in the Assembly since May 2025, having previously held the same position between 2019 and 2023. She was the Conservative Party candidate for the 2024 London mayoral election, finishing in second place behind incumbent mayor Sadiq Khan.

== Early life and business career ==
Susan Mary Cole was born in March 1955 at Willesden, Middlesex (since 1965 in Greater London). She is the elder daughter of Benjamin Cole (1912–72) and Mary née Palmer (1926–99). In her late teens she gained practical work experience as a car mechanic in a garage owned by her father, where she learnt how to 'strip down an engine'.

== Political career ==
=== Harrow London Borough Council ===
Hall was elected as a councillor for Hatch End ward on Harrow London Borough Council in the 2006 election, after previously standing unsuccessfully for Headstone South in 2002. She has been re-elected as a councillor at subsequent elections in 2010, 2014, 2018 and 2022. In 2007, she was appointed to Harrow Council's cabinet, responsible for the environment and community safety. Hall became deputy leader of the Conservative group on Harrow Council in 2008. She was then elected in 2010 as Leader of the group, becoming Leader of the Opposition. She was appointed to the London Fire and Emergency Planning Authority as a Borough nominee in June 2010.

Hall took over as the leader of Harrow's hung council in September 2013. As council leader, Hall commissioned thermal imaging cameras to stop illegal 'beds in sheds' developments and identify five cannabis farms. Hall returned to Opposition leader after the May 2014 election. Also in 2014, she tweeted that TOWIE star Gemma Collins, in a short appearance on ITV's I'm a Celebrity...Get Me Out of Here, was fat and ghastly and a "stupid fat blonde woman". Hall subsequently told ITV News "I meant it and would say it to her face" and said she was a victim of a campaign by the Fire Brigades Union.

=== London Assembly ===
Hall became a Member of the London Assembly in June 2017, replacing Kemi Badenoch AM who stood down upon being elected as MP for Saffron Walden. Hall was the fourth London-wide candidate on the Conservative Party list at the 2016 London Assembly election. Hall was elected deputy leader of the London Conservatives in 2018, before succeeding Gareth Bacon as Leader of the Conservatives on the London Assembly, after he was elected as MP for Orpington in the December 2019 general election. In March 2020, regarding the COVID-19 pandemic in London, Hall wrote to Mayor Sadiq Khan, asking him to "call in the police" to "enforce the coronavirus lockdown" in order to protect National Health Service workers.

Ahead of the 2020 U.S. presidential election, Hall tweeted "Come on Donald Trump - make sure you win and wipe the smile off this man's face", referring to Sadiq Khan, who is a vocal critic of Trump. Following the storming of the United States Capitol by Trump's supporters in January 2021, Hall compared the cause of the riot with remaining opposition to Brexit in the UK. Re-elected in the 2021 London Assembly election, Hall stood down as leader of the London Conservatives in May 2023, and was replaced by Neil Garratt. Hall was re-elected to the London Assembly as a London-wide member at the 2024 election.

=== London mayoral candidacy ===
Hall was selected, on 19 July 2023, as the Conservative Party candidate for the 2024 London mayoral election. Her campaign slogan was "Safer with Susan".

To tackle crime, Hall said she would invest £200 million in the Metropolitan Police, funded by reducing staff costs at Transport for London. She would establish police units specialising in attending to burglaries, robberies and thefts. Hall pledged to reverse the 2023 ULEZ outer expansion and in its place set up a £50 million fund to "tackle air pollution hotspots." She supported Londoners having the choice to send non-compliant ULEZ cars and particularly 4x4s to Ukraine in support of the war effort.

On 19 July 2023, the Conservative Party deputy chairman Nickie Aiken MP wrote to the Evening Standard's editor Dylan Jones accusing the paper of "misogyny" with their choice of photo of Hall for their front page, describing it as "a clear mockery". In August 2023, Dawn Butler and nine other Labour MPs wrote to Conservative Party chairman Greg Hands criticising Hall's comments that the Notting Hill Carnival was "dangerous" and put local residents through "hell." The letter accused Hall of implying that the Black community "has a propensity towards violence and disorder." Hall's team said that the allegations were "desperate smears and a complete mischaracterisation" of her comments.

In September 2023, Hall was reported to have liked tweets that praised Enoch Powell and described London's Mayor Sadiq Khan as "our nipple height mayor of Londonistan". Hall's spokesman said "Susan engages with many people on Twitter without endorsing their views". In October 2023, Hall received criticism from political opponents and Jewish groups for saying "I know how frightened some of the [Jewish] community is because of the divisive attitude of Sadiq Khan". Nusrat Ghani, Minister of State for Industry, criticised Hall for using the "language of fear and demeaning our political opponents", to which Hall replied her comments were "misinterpreted". Hall’s campaign drew controversy in March 2024 for using images of panicking people in New York.

Hall advocated for tourist tax-free shopping in London working. Writing to Chancellor of the Exchequer in September 2023 she pointed to research by the Centre for Economics and Business Research which found that were refunds restored then for every £1 refunded in sales tax to foreign tourists the Exchequer would gain £1.56 in other taxes due to the "dynamic economic effects" of tourist expenditure. She said that this would amount "to an increase in GDP of £10.7bn in 2023" and help support more than 200,000 jobs.

Hall finished in second place, behind incumbent mayor Sadiq Khan. After the election, Conservative Party figures blamed the "negative" campaign run by Hall as being partly behind the loss. Greg Hands, then a Conservative MP, said there was not a "knockout candidate" selected, with one campaigner telling the Evening Standard that Hall "was the worst candidate ever, worse than Shaun Bailey.”

Hall later stated in an interview on the YouTube channel M.D.Johnson that she would not look to run again for Mayor, saying she will "leave that to someone that's younger".

=== 2025 ===
With effect from 2 May 2025, Hall was reappointed to her former position as leader of the Conservatives in the London Assembly, replacing Neil Garratt.

On 2 July 2025, it was revealed that Hall had been appointed as an adviser to the Rupert Lowe-led Restore Britain organisation. She left Restore Britain following its establishment as a political party.

== Political positions ==
Harry Phibbs, writing in The Sunday Telegraph in September 2023, described Hall as an "authentic, unapologetic Conservative". Hall advocates for community safety and campaigns for crime prevention, calling for an increase in police funding in 2019 to tackle knife crime. As a candidate for London Mayor, Hall pledged to invest £200 million into the Metropolitan Police. Claiming in November 2023 her wallet was pickpocketed on the London Underground, she asserted crime was "completely out of control" in London, but the wallet was returned by another passenger who suggested that Hall had dropped it rather than it being stolen.

Hall opposed the 2023 outer expansion of ULEZ, a congestion pricing program in Greater London, vowing to scrap the expansion if elected mayor. She also calls for the removal of low traffic neighbourhoods (LTNs), which impose restrictions on cars. Hall has been described as a populist. In her London mayoral campaign, Hall said she would reduce costs at Transport for London by reforming bonuses, pension arrangements and the provision of nominee passes, which enable Londoners who live with TfL staff to travel free. Sadiq Khan has defended these, arguing that no net savings would be made by scrapping them.

Hall said that if elected mayor, she would pivot away from building more apartment blocks in London, arguing that tower blocks are "not where you could raise a family".

In August 2023, Hall tweeted support for Restore Trust, a political advocacy group which seeks to change policies of the National Trust.

== Personal life ==
In 1977, she married Gerald Peter Hall, a hairdresser, with whom she has two children; the couple are now divorced. They established a beauty salon in Harrow, which grew to employ over 20 people before closing. Her daughter, Louise Staite, stood as the Conservative parliamentary candidate for Oxford East at the 2019 general election, but failed to gain the Labour-held seat.

== See also ==
- List of female members of the London Assembly
