= Headstone South (ward) =

- Former electoral ward for the Harrow London Borough Council
- Borough: Harrow
- County: Greater London

Former electoral ward
- Created: 1978
- Abolished: 2022
- Replaced by: Headstone ward
- GSS code: E05000293 (2002–2022)

Headstone South was an electoral ward in the London Borough of Harrow from 1978 to 2022. The ward was first used in the 1978 elections and last used for the 2018 elections.

It returned councillors to Harrow London Borough Council.

== 2002–2022 Harrow council elections ==
There was a revision of ward boundaries in Harrow in 2002.

=== 2018 election ===
The election took place on 3 May 2018.

2018 Harrow London Borough Council election: Headstone South (3)
Party	Candidate	Votes	%	±%
Labour	Simon Brown	2,066	61.9	
Labour	Pamela Fitzpatrick	2,002	60.0	
Labour	Sasi Suresh	1,880	56.4	
Conservative	Calum McHale	974	29.2	
Conservative	Mala Morjaria	938	28.1	
Conservative	Prakash Raja	850	25.5	
Liberal Democrats	Lisa-Maria Bornemann	414	12.4	
Liberal Democrats	Claire Ingham	328	9.8	
Total votes				
Labour hold		Swing		
Labour hold		Swing		
Labour hold		Swing		

=== 2014 election ===
The election took place on 22 May 2014.

2014 Harrow London Borough Council election: Headstone South (3)
Party	Candidate	Votes	%	±%
Labour	Simon Brown	1,602	47.3	+5.1
Labour	Pamela Fitzpatrick	1,519	44.8	+10.4
Labour	Sasi Suresh	1,458	43.0	+7.2
Conservative	Christine Thomas	954	28.1	−2.2
Conservative	Prakash Raja	922	27.2	−0.8
Conservative	Pravin Seedher	859	25.3	−1.1
Independent Labour	Asad Omar	408	12.0	−22.4
Independent Labour	Dushka Ahmad	401	11.8	N/A
Liberal Democrats	Rosemarie Beynon	361	10.6	−17.9
Liberal Democrats	David Barks	335	9.9	−15.5
Independent Labour	James Allie	322	9.5	N/A
Liberal Democrats	Simon Gardiner	312	9.2	−14.6
Turnout		3,390	40.7	
Labour hold		Swing		
Labour hold		Swing		
Labour hold		Swing		

=== 2010 election ===
The election on 6 May 2010 took place on the same day as the United Kingdom general election.

2010 Harrow London Borough Council election: Headstone South (3)
Party	Candidate	Votes	%	±%
Labour	Bill Stephenson	2,260	40.5	
Labour	Sasikala Suresh	1,914		
Labour	Asad Omar	1,843		
Conservative	Christine Thomas	1,623	29.1	
Liberal Democrats	Ronald Thornton	1,527	27.4	
Conservative	Prakash Raja	1,499		
Conservative	Savan Shah	1,413		
Liberal Democrats	Riyaz Khaku	1,357		
Liberal Democrats	Nahid Boethe	1,272		
CPA	Margaret Clarke	171	3.1	
CPA	Mauran Uthayakumar	157		
CPA	Gloria Folaranmi	60		
Turnout		5,381	67	
Labour hold		Swing		
Labour hold		Swing		
Labour hold		Swing		

=== 2006 election ===
The election took place on 4 May 2006.

2006 Harrow London Borough Council election: Headstone South (3)
Party	Candidate	Votes	%	±%
Labour	Bill Stephenson	1,249	34.0	
Labour	Sasikala Suresh	1,145		
Labour	Asad Omar	1,097		
Liberal Democrats	Oenone Cox	1,067	29.0	
Liberal Democrats	Darren Diamond	1,036		
Liberal Democrats	Sohail Anwar	1,011		
Conservative	Jeremy Child	928	25.3	
Conservative	Mary John	897		
Conservative	Purshottam Patel	856		
Green	Jennifer Hunt	431	11.7	
Turnout			46.7	
Labour hold		Swing		
Labour hold		Swing		
Labour hold		Swing		

=== 2002 election ===
The election took place on 2 May 2002.

2002 Harrow London Borough Council election: Headstone South (3)
Party	Candidate	Votes	%
Labour	William Stephenson	1,275	20.3
Labour	Anne Whitehead	1,218	19.4
Labour	Asad Omar	1,187	18.9
Conservative	Susan Hall	743	11.8
Conservative	Stephen Dixon	730	11.6
Conservative	Ian Moore	685	10.9
Green	Jennifer Hunt	418	6.6
Total votes		6,256	100
Turnout			31.2
Labour win (new boundaries)			
Labour win (new boundaries)			
Labour win (new boundaries)			

== 1978–2002 Harrow council elections ==
=== 1998 election ===
The election took place on 7 May 1998.

1998 Harrow London Borough Council election: Headstone South (3)
Party	Candidate	Votes	%	±%
Labour	William Stephenson	1,324	17.3	
Labour	Gillian Travers	1,167	15.2	
Labour	Anne Whitehead	1,143	14.9	
Liberal Democrats	Stephen Giles-Medhurst	922	12.0	
Liberal Democrats	Clifford Thomas	870	11.3	
Liberal Democrats	John Branch	755	9.8	
Conservative	Stephen Hall	434	5.6	
Conservative	Theresa Hyde	402	5.2	
Conservative	Richard Booth	391	5.1	
Green	Justin Challener	244	3.1	
Total votes		7,652	100	
Turnout			39.8	
Labour gain from Liberal Democrats		Swing		
Labour gain from Liberal Democrats		Swing		
Labour gain from Liberal Democrats		Swing		

=== 1994 election ===
The election took place on 5 May 1994.

=== 1990 election ===
The election took place on 3 May 1990.

1990 Harrow London Borough Council election: Headstone South (3)
Party	Candidate	Votes	%
Lib Dem Focus Team	Stephen Giles-Medhurst	1,317	40.31
Lib Dem Focus Team	Derek Wiseman	1,317	
Lib Dem Focus Team	John Branch	1,302	
Labour	Susan Buchanan	946	28.08
Labour	Susan Gray	913	
Labour	William Stephenson	884	
Conservative	Alan Brown	832	24.70
Conservative	John Hall	801	
Conservative	Stephen Hall	779	
Green	Neil Mabbs	225	6.91
Registered electors		6,733	
Turnout		3,319	49.29
Rejected ballots		2	0.06
Lib Dem Focus Team hold			
Lib Dem Focus Team hold			
Lib Dem Focus Team hold			

=== 1986 election ===
The election took place on 8 May 1986.

=== 1982 election ===
The election took place on 6 May 1982.

=== 1978 election ===
The election took place on 4 May 1978.
