= Harrow on the Hill (ward) =

Electoral ward in London, England

- Electoral ward for the Harrow London Borough Council
- Borough: Harrow
- County: Greater London
- Population: 10,786 (2021)
- Major settlements: Harrow on the Hill
- Area: 3.329 km²

Current electoral ward
- Created: 1978
- Seats: 2 (since 2022); 3 (until 2022)
- Created from: Harrow-on-the-Hill & Greenhill

Harrow on the Hill is an electoral ward in the London Borough of Harrow. The ward was first used in the 1978 elections and elects three councillors to Harrow London Borough Council. The ward was known as Harrow-on-the-Hill from 1978 to 2002.

== Geography ==
The ward is named after Harrow on the Hill.

== Councillors ==
Election	Councillors	
2022	Eden Kulig (Labour)	Stephen Hickman (Labour)

== Elections ==
=== 2022 ===
Harrow on the Hill (2)
Party	Candidate	Votes	%	±%
Labour	Eden Kulig	1,261	46.1	
Labour	Stephen Hickman	1,260	46.1	
Conservative	Kiran Fothergill	1,208	44.2	
Conservative	Will Jackson	1,116	40.8	
Green	Soody Kim	325	11.9	
Liberal Democrats	Gaye Branch	296	10.8	
Turnout			39.1	
Labour hold		Swing		
Labour hold		Swing		

== See also ==
- List of electoral wards in Greater London
