= Kenton West =

Electoral ward in London, England

- Electoral ward for the Harrow London Borough Council
- Borough: Harrow
- County: Greater London
- Population: 9,992 (2021)
- Major settlements: Kenton, London
- Area: 1.569 km²

Current electoral ward
- Created: 1978
- Seats: 2 (since 2022); 3 (until 2022)

Kenton West is an electoral ward in the London Borough of Harrow. The ward was first used in the 2022 elections and elects two councillors to Harrow London Borough Council.

== Geography ==
The ward is named after Kenton.

== Councillors ==
Election	Councillors	
2022	Vipin Mithani (Conservative)	Kanti Rabadia (Conservative)

== Elections ==
=== 2022 ===
Kenton West (2)
Party	Candidate	Votes	%	±%
Conservative	Vipin Chhotalal Mithani	1,701	54.9	
Conservative	Kanti Rabadia	1,635	52.7	
Labour	Ajay Harilal Maru	1300	41.9	
Labour	Meera Ajay Maru	1295	41.8	
Liberal Democrats	Charles David Boethe	269	8.7	
Turnout		3181	44	
Conservative gain from Labour		Swing		
Conservative hold		Swing		

== See also ==
- List of electoral wards in Greater London
