= Roxeth (ward) =

Electoral ward in London, England

- Electoral ward for the Harrow London Borough Council
- Borough: Harrow
- County: Greater London
- Population: 15,864 (2021)
- Major settlements: Roxeth
- Area: 1.905 km²

Current electoral ward
- Created: 1965
- Seats: 3 (since 1978); 4 (until 1978)

Roxeth is an electoral ward in the London Borough of Harrow. The ward was first used in the 1964 elections and elects three councillors to Harrow London Borough Council.

== Geography ==
The ward is named after the suburb of Roxeth.

== Councillors ==
Election	Councillors		
2026	John Baxter (Conservative)	Peymana Assad (Labour)	Rashmi Kalu (Labour)

== Elections ==
=== 2022 ===
Roxeth (3)
Party	Candidate	Votes	%	±%
Labour	Jerry Miles	2,180	60.8	
Labour	Peymana Assad	2,009	56.0	
Labour	Rashmi Suranga Kalu	1,991	55.5	
Conservative	Rajagopal Deleepan	1422	39.6	
Conservative	Sockalingam Karunalingam	1364	38.0	
Conservative	Subankani Pathmanathan Pratheepan	1242	34.6	
Green	Swati Rameshchandra Patel	553	15.4	
Turnout		3881	35	
Labour hold		Swing		
Labour hold		Swing		
Labour hold		Swing		

== See also ==
- List of electoral wards in Greater London
