= Pinner (ward) =

Electoral ward in London, England

- Electoral ward for the Harrow London Borough Council
- Borough: Harrow
- County: Greater London
- Population: 13,137 (2021)
- Major settlements: Pinner
- Area: 4.034 km²

Current electoral ward
- Created: 1978
- Seats: 3

Pinner is an electoral ward in the London Borough of Harrow. The ward was first used in the 1978 elections and elects three councillors to Harrow London Borough Council.

== Geography ==
The ward is named after Pinner.

== Councillors ==
Election	Councillors		
2022	Norman Stevenson (Conservative)	Kuha Kumaran (Conservative)	Paul Osborn (Conservative)

== Elections ==
=== 2022 ===
Pinner (3)
Party	Candidate	Votes	%	±%
Conservative	Norman Shairp Stevenson	2,044	51.4	−2.5
Conservative	Kuha Kumaran	2,012	50.6	−2.7
Conservative	Paul Simon Osborn	1,945	48.9	−1.1
Labour	Jeffrey Alan Anderson	1,271	32.0	+6.4
Labour	James Frank Lockie	1,104	27.8	+4.7
Labour	Lesley Stackpoole	1,077	27.1	+4.3
Liberal Democrats	Veronica Margaret Chamberlain	775	19.5	+6.0
Green	Krystel Shin Pei Lee	618	15.6	N/A
Liberal Democrats	Jacalina Bunce-Linsell	552	13.9	+1.7
Turnout		3,974	39.0	
Conservative hold		Swing		
Conservative hold		Swing		
Conservative hold		Swing		

== See also ==
- List of electoral wards in Greater London
