= Kenton East =

Electoral ward in London, England

- Electoral ward for the Harrow London Borough Council
- Borough: Harrow
- County: Greater London
- Population: 13,612 (2021)
- Major settlements: Kenton, London
- Area: 1.541 km²

Current electoral ward
- Created: 1978
- Seats: 3

Kenton East is an electoral ward in the London Borough of Harrow. The ward was first used in the 1978 elections and elects three councillors to Harrow London Borough Council.

== Geography ==
The ward is named after Kenton.

== Councillors ==
Election	Councillors		
2022	Nitesh Hirani (Conservative)	Chetna Halai (Conservative)	Samir Sumaria (Conservative)

== Elections ==
=== 2022 ===
Kenton East (3)
Party	Candidate	Votes	%	±%
Conservative	Nitesh Hirani	2,695	65.7	
Conservative	Chetna Halai	2,498	60.9	
Conservative	Samir Sobhagchand Sumaria	2,223	54.2	
Labour	Rohit Dixit	1650	40.3	
Labour	Manju Shivji Raghwani	1626	39.7	
Labour	Rangdatt Janakkumar Joshi	1605	39.2	
Turnout		4368	40	
Conservative hold		Swing		
Conservative gain from Labour		Swing		
Conservative hold		Swing		

== See also ==
- List of electoral wards in Greater London
