= Roxbourne (ward) =

Electoral ward in London, England

- Electoral ward for the Harrow London Borough Council
- Borough: Harrow
- County: Greater London
- Population: 9,905 (2021)
- Major settlements: Roxbourne
- Area: 1.059 km²

Current electoral ward
- Created: 1965
- Seats: 2 (since 2022); 3 (until 2022)

Roxbourne is an electoral ward in the London Borough of Harrow. The ward was first used in the 1964 elections and elects two councillors to Harrow London Borough Council.

== History ==
Since 2006, Graham Henson has been councillor. In 2018, he was elected leader of the Labour Group.

== Geography ==
The ward is named after the suburb of Roxbourne.

== Councillors ==
Election	Councillors	
2022	Graham Henson (Labour)	Maxine Henson (Labour)

== Elections ==
=== 2022 ===
Roxbourne (2)
Party	Candidate	Votes	%	±%
Labour	Graham Douglas Henson	1,446	65.2	
Labour	Maxine Margaret Henson	1,369	61.7	
Conservative	Arunasalam Rajalingam	764	34.4	
Conservative	John Stuart Haddon Hinkley	687	31.0	
Liberal Democrats	Thomas Peter Sikandar Yasin	170	7.7	
Turnout		2306	33	
Labour hold		Swing		
Labour hold		Swing		

== See also ==
- List of electoral wards in Greater London
