= Harrow Weald (ward) =

Electoral ward in London, England

- Electoral ward for the Harrow London Borough Council
- Borough: Harrow
- County: Greater London
- Population: 14,343 (2021)
- Major settlements: Harrow Weald
- Area: 4.856 km²

Current electoral ward
- Created: 1965
- Seats: 3 (since 1978); 4 (until 1978)

Harrow Weald is an electoral ward in the London Borough of Harrow. The ward was first used in the 1964 elections and elects three councillors to Harrow London Borough Council.

== Geography ==
The ward is named after the district of Harrow Weald.

== Councillors ==
| Election | Councillors | | |
|---|---|---|---|
| 2022 | Ramji Chauhan (Conservative) | Pritesh Patel (Conservative) | Stephen Greek (Conservative) |

== Elections ==
=== 2022 ===
Harrow Weald (3)
| Party | Candidate | Votes | % | ±% |
|---|---|---|---|---|
| Conservative | Ramji Chauhan* | 2,055 | 55.9 | |
| Conservative | Pritesh Patel* | 2,017 | 54.9 | |
| Conservative | Stephen Greek* | 1,989 | 54.1 | |
| Labour | Sophie Green | 1,318 | 35.9 | |
| Labour | Tejinder Sharma | 1,227 | 33.4 | |
| Labour | Ahmed Ali-Ashghar | 1,221 | 33.2 | |
| Liberal Democrats | Valerie Taylor | 437 | 11.9 | |
| Liberal Democrats | Darren Diamond | 395 | 10.7 | |
| Liberal Democrats | Derek Hill | 366 | 10.0 | |
| Turnout | | | 36.2 | |
| Conservative hold | | Swing | | |
| Conservative hold | | Swing | | |
| Conservative hold | | Swing | | |

== See also ==
- List of electoral wards in Greater London
