= Rayners Lane (ward) =

Electoral ward in London, England

- Electoral ward for the Harrow London Borough Council
- Borough: Harrow
- County: Greater London
- Population: 9,143 (2021)
- Major settlements: Rayners Lane
- Area: 1.085 km²

Current electoral ward
- Created: 1978
- Seats: 2 (since 2022); 3 (until 2022)

Rayners Lane is an electoral ward in the London Borough of Harrow. The ward was first used in the 1978 elections and elects two councillors to Harrow London Borough Council.

== Geography ==
The ward is named after the suburb of Rayners Lane.

== Councillors ==
Election	Councillors	
2022	Krishna Suresh (Labour)	Thaya Idaikkadar (Conservative)

== Elections ==
=== 2022 ===
Rayners Lane (2)
Party	Candidate	Votes	%	±%
Labour	Krishna Suresh	1,399	44.1	+1.2
Conservative	Thaya Idaikkadar	977	30.8	+1.9
Labour	Tarza Ahmed Sharif	962	30.3	−8.6
Conservative	Mala Morjaria	886	27.9	+0.0
Liberal Democrats	Chris Noyce	665	20.9	−15.9
Independent	Sockalingam Yogalingam	559	17.6	N/A
Liberal Democrats	Gerri Noyce	426	13.4	−14.7
Green	Rowan Nicholas Charles Langley	182	5.7	N/A
Independent	Herbie Crossman	166	5.2	N/A
Turnout		3,175	45.0	
Labour hold		Swing		
Conservative gain from Labour		Swing		

== See also ==
- List of electoral wards in Greater London
