= Centenary (ward) =

Electoral ward in London, England

- Former electoral ward for the Harrow London Borough Council
- Borough: Harrow
- County: Greater London
- Population: 15,201 (2021)
- Major settlements: Centenary Park
- Area: 2.054 km²

Former electoral ward
- Created: 1978, 2022
- Abolished: 2002
- Seats: 3

Centenary is an electoral ward in the London Borough of Harrow. The ward was first used in the 2022 elections and elects three councillors to Harrow London Borough Council. It was previously used between 1978 and 2002.

== Geography ==
The ward is named after Centenary Park.

== Councillors ==
Election	Councillors		
2022	David Ashton (Conservative)	Govind Bharadia (Conservative)	Salim Chowdhury (Conservative)

== Elections ==
=== 2022 ===
Centenary (3)
Party	Candidate	Votes	%	±%
Conservative	Govind Bharadia	2,267	58.7	
Conservative	David Ashton	2,165	56.0	
Conservative	Salim Chowdhury	1,799	46.6	
Labour	Parvine Mawkin	1,523	39.4	
Labour	Brahma Mohanty	1,484	38.4	
Labour	Yusuf Yusuf	1,294	33.5	
Liberal Democrats	Nishi Karia	549	14.2	
Liberal Democrats	Laurence Cox	511	13.2	
Turnout			39.5	
Conservative win (new seat)				
Conservative win (new seat)				
Conservative win (new seat)				

== See also ==
- List of electoral wards in Greater London
