= Canons (ward) =

Electoral ward in London, England

- Electoral ward for the Harrow London Borough Council
- Borough: Harrow
- County: Greater London
- Population: 9,735 (2021)
- Major settlements: Canons Park
- Area: 2.166 km²

Current electoral ward
- Created: 1978
- Councillors: 2 (since 2022); 3 (until 2022)

Canons is an electoral ward in the London Borough of Harrow. The ward was first used in the 1978 elections and elects two councillors to Harrow London Borough Council.

== Geography ==
The ward is named after the suburb of Canons Park.

== Councillors ==
Election	Councillors	
2022	Ameet Jogia (Conservative)	Amir Moshenson (Conservative)

== Elections ==
=== 2022 ===
Canons (2)
Party	Candidate	Votes	%	±%
Conservative	Ameet Jogia*	1,679	69.1	
Conservative	Amir Moshenson*	1,490	61.3	
Labour	Sanjay Dighe	698	28.7	
Labour	Linda Lockie	673	27.7	
Liberal Democrats	James Bore	323	13.3	
Turnout			36.7	
Conservative hold		Swing		
Conservative hold		Swing		

== See also ==
- List of electoral wards in Greater London
