= Greenhill (Harrow ward) =

Electoral ward in London, England

- Electoral ward for the Harrow London Borough Council
- Borough: Harrow
- County: Greater London
- Population: 11,015 (2021)
- Major settlements: Greenhill, Harrow
- Area: 1.067 km²

Current electoral ward
- Created: 1978
- Seats: 3

Greenhill is an electoral ward in the London Borough of Harrow. The ward was first used in the 1978 elections and elects three councillors to Harrow London Borough Council.

== Geography ==
The ward is named after Greenhill, Harrow.

== Councillors ==
Election	Councillors		
2022	Dan Anderson (Labour)	Ghazanfar Ali (Labour)	Aneka Shah-Levy (Labour)

== Elections ==
=== 2022 ===
Greenhill (3)
Party	Candidate	Votes	%	±%
Labour	Dan Anderson*	1,115	48.5	
Labour	Ghazanfar Ali*	1,017	44.2	
Labour	Aneka Shah-Levy	1,009	43.9	
Conservative	Simon Dunkerley	852	37.0	
Conservative	Rhys Benjamin	841	36.6	
Conservative	Eileen Kinnear	800	34.8	
Green	Sonia Moore	401	17.4	
Liberal Democrats	Prakash Nandhra	337	14.7	
Liberal Democrats	Nahid Boethe	265	11.5	
Liberal Democrats	Lucy Tonge	263	11.4	
Turnout			29.8	
Labour hold		Swing		
Labour hold		Swing		
Labour hold		Swing		

== See also ==
- List of electoral wards in Greater London
