= Harrow London Borough Council =

Local authority for the London Borough of Harrow in Greater London, England

Type
- Type: London borough

Leadership
- Mayor: Yogesh Teli, Conservative since 20 May 2026
- Leader: Paul Osborn, Conservative since 24 May 2022
- Managing Director: Alex Dewsnap since May 2023

Structure
- Seats: 55 councillors
- Political groups: Administration (41) Conservative (41) Other parties (14) Labour (12) Arise (1) Independent (1)
- Length of term: Whole council elected every four years

Elections
- Voting system: Plurality at-large (FPTP)
- Last election: 7 May 2026
- Next election: 2 May 2030

Meeting place
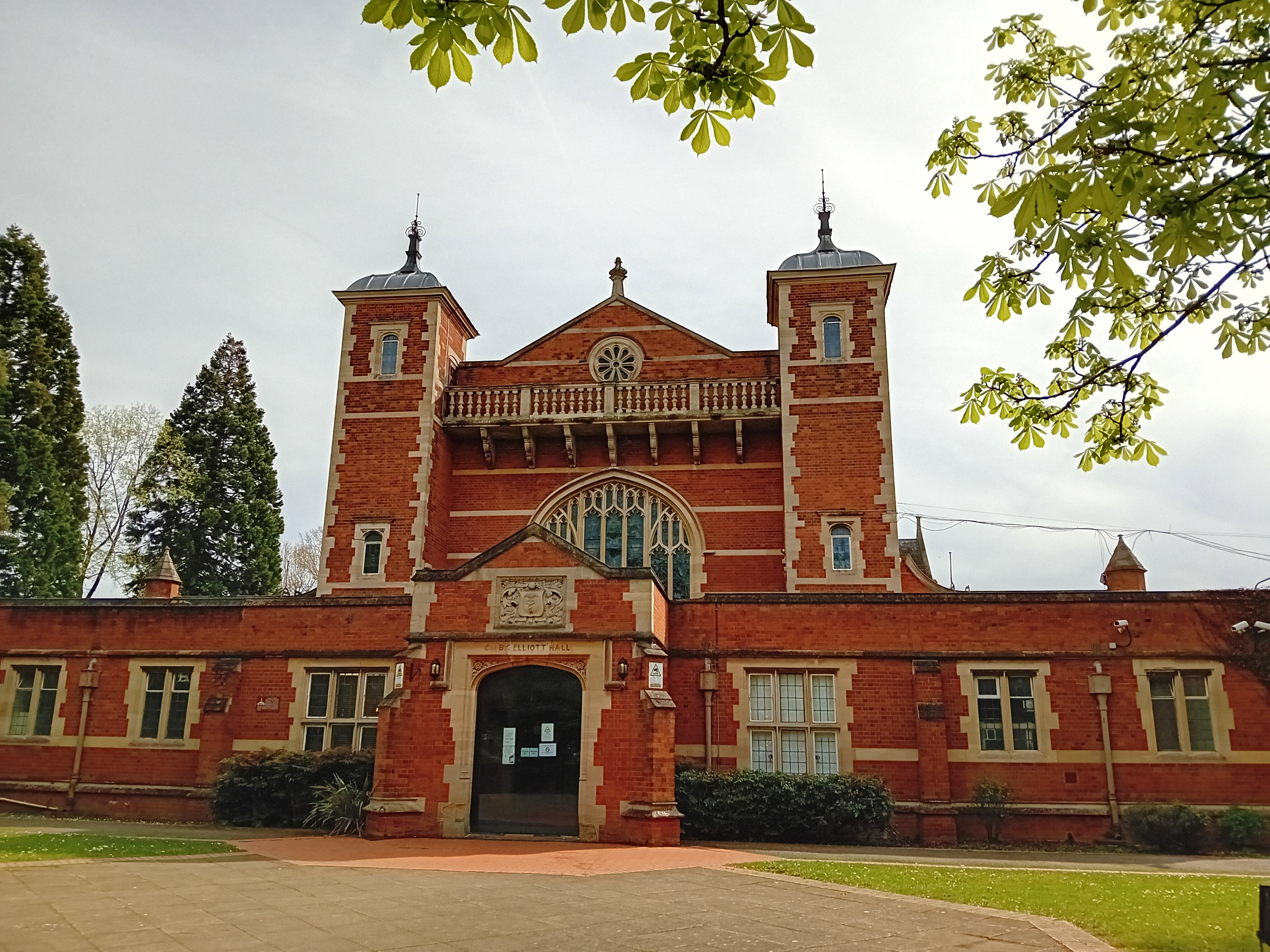
- Harrow Arts Centre, 171 Uxbridge Road, Pinner, HA5 4EA

Website
- www.harrow.gov.uk

Harrow London Borough Council /ˈhæroʊ/, also known as Harrow Council, is the local authority for the London Borough of Harrow in Greater London, England. The council is responsible for the provision of a number of services, within the borough of Harrow. The council has been under Conservative majority control since 2022. Full council meetings are held at the Harrow Arts Centre and the council's main offices are at the Council Hub in Wealdstone.

== History ==
The first elected local authority for Harrow was a local board, established in 1850 covering the central part of the ancient parish of Harrow on the Hill. Such boards were reconstituted as urban district councils under the Local Government Act 1894.

The urban district was significantly enlarged in 1934, at which point it was renamed from 'Harrow on the Hill' to just 'Harrow'. Harrow Urban District was incorporated as a municipal borough in 1954, governed by a body formally called the "Mayor, Aldermen and Burgesses of the Borough of Harrow", generally known as the corporation or borough council.

The London Borough of Harrow and its council were created under the London Government Act 1963, with the first election held in 1964. For its first year the council acted as a shadow authority alongside the outgoing Harrow Borough Council, which covered the same area. The new council formally came into its powers on 1 April 1965.

From 1965 until 1986 the council was a lower-tier authority, with upper-tier functions provided by the Greater London Council. The split of powers and functions meant that the Greater London Council was responsible for "wide area" services such as fire, ambulance, flood prevention, and refuse disposal; with the boroughs (including Harrow) responsible for "personal" services such as social care, libraries, cemeteries and refuse collection. As an outer London borough council Harrow has been a local education authority since 1965. The Greater London Council was abolished in 1986 and its functions passed to the London Boroughs, with some services provided through joint committees.

Since 2000 the Greater London Authority has taken some responsibility for highways and planning control from the council, but within the English local government system the council remains a "most purpose" authority in terms of the available range of powers and functions.

== Powers and functions ==
The local authority derives its powers and functions from the London Government Act 1963 and subsequent legislation, and has the powers and functions of a London borough council. It sets council tax and as a billing authority it also collects precepts for Greater London Authority functions and business rates. It sets planning policies which complement Greater London Authority and national policies, and decides on almost all planning applications accordingly. It is also the local education authority.

== Premises ==
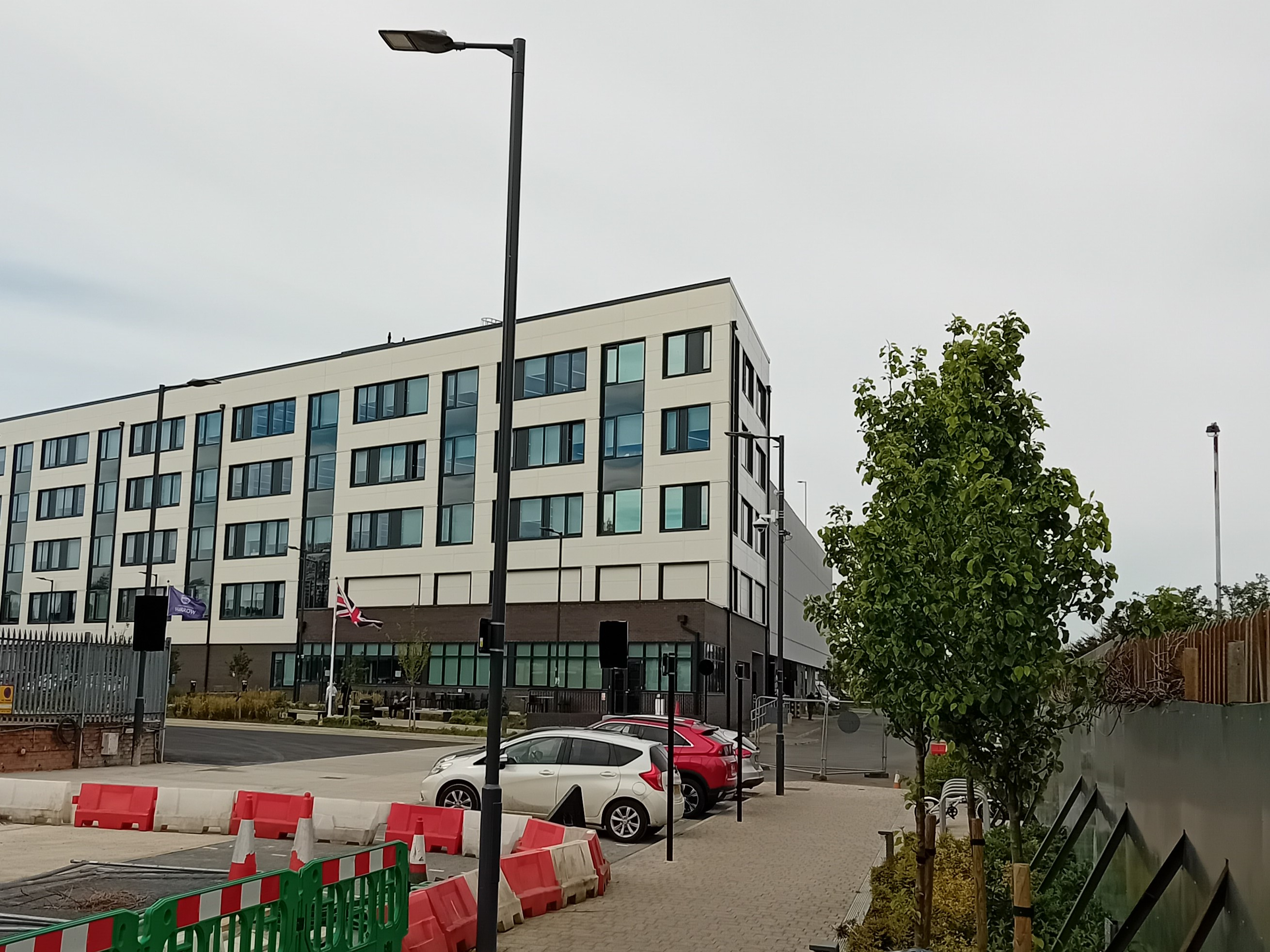
Council Hub, Kenmore Avenue, Harrow, HA3 8LU: Council's main offices, built 2022

The council has its main offices at the Council Hub on Kenmore Avenue in the Wealdstone area of Harrow. The building was purpose-built for the council in 2022. Full council meetings are held at the Harrow Arts Centre in Hatch End, which also houses the mayor's parlour.

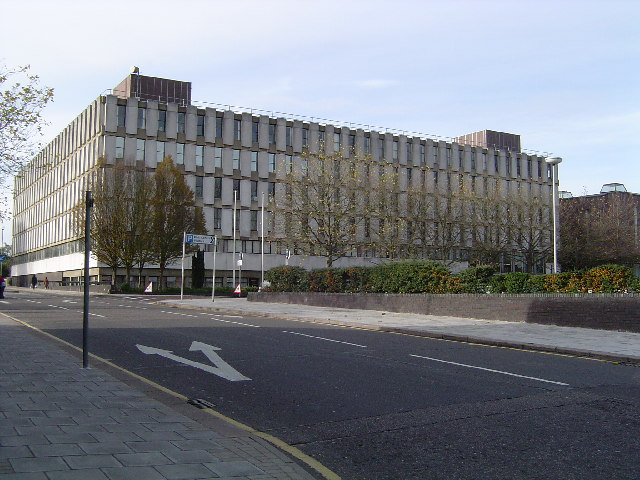
Harrow Civic Centre: Council's former headquarters 1973–2023

Prior to 2022 the council was based at Harrow Civic Centre on Station Road in Harrow, which had been purpose-built for the council, being completed in 1973.

== Political control ==
The council has been under Conservative majority control since 2022.

The first election was held in 1964, initially operating as a shadow authority alongside the outgoing authorities until it came into its powers on 1 April 1965. Political control of the council since 1965 has been as follows:

Party in control	Years
Conservative	1965–1971
No overall control	1971–1974
Conservative	1974–1994
No overall control	1994–1998
Labour	1998–2002
No overall control	2002–2006
Conservative	2006–2010
Labour	2010–2013
No overall control	2013–2014
Labour	2014–2022
Conservative	2022–present

=== Leadership ===
The role of mayor is largely ceremonial in Harrow. Political leadership is instead provided by the leader of the council. The leaders since 1965 have been:

Councillor	Party	From	To
Charles Jordan	Conservative	1965	1968
Edward Buckle	Conservative	1968	1971
Cyril Harrison	Labour	1971	1974
Harold Mote	Conservative	1974	1977
Edward Buckle	Conservative	1977	1979
Brian Clark	Conservative	1979	1984
Donald Abbott	Conservative	1984	1987
Ron Grant	Conservative	1987	1991
Donald Abbott	Conservative	1991	1994
Chris Noyce	Liberal Democrats	1994	1995
Andrew Wiseman	Liberal Democrats	1995	1996
Chris Noyce	Liberal Democrats	1996	May 1998
Bob Shannon	Labour	20 May 1998	28 Feb 2002
Archie Foulds	Labour	28 Feb 2002	21 Oct 2004
Navin Shah	Labour	21 Oct 2004	May 2006
Chris Mote	Conservative	25 May 2006	May 2008
David Ashton	Conservative	8 May 2008	May 2010
Bill Stephenson	Labour	25 May 2010	8 Nov 2012
Thaya Idaikkadar	Labour	8 Nov 2012	Apr 2013
Thaya Idaikkadar	Independent Labour	Apr 2013	16 Sep 2013
Susan Hall	Conservative	16 Sep 2013	May 2014
David Perry	Labour	12 Jun 2014	19 May 2016
Sachin Shah	Labour	19 May 2016	May 2018
Graham Henson	Labour	24 May 2018	May 2022
Paul Osborn	Conservative	26 May 2022	

== Composition ==
Following the 2026 election, the composition of councillors became as it remained as at November 2026:

Party	Councillors
Conservative	41
Labour	12
Arise	1
Independent	1 (Note: Councillor Will Jackson was nominated as a Conservative candidate but suspended from the party before the election and as of November 2026 sits on the council as an independent.)
Total	55

The next election is due in May 2030.

== Wards ==
The wards of Harrow and the number of seats:

1. Belmont (2)
2. Canons (2)
3. Centenary (3)
4. Edgware (3)
5. Greenhill (3)
6. Harrow on the Hill (2)
7. Harrow Weald (3)
8. Hatch End (2)
9. Headstone (3)
10. Kenton East (3)
11. Kenton West (2)
12. Marlborough (3)
13. North Harrow (2)
14. Pinner (3)
15. Pinner South (3)
16. Rayners Lane (2)
17. Roxbourne (2)
18. Roxeth (3)
19. Stanmore (3)
20. Wealdstone North (2)
21. Wealdstone South (2)
22. West Harrow (2)

== Elections ==
Since the last boundary changes in 2022, the council has comprised 55 councillors representing 22 wards, with each ward electing two or three councillors. Elections are held every four years.
