= 2026 Harrow London Borough Council election =

2026 English local government election

- 7 May 2026

All 55 seats to Harrow London Borough Council 28 seats needed for a majority
- Turnout: 42.24%
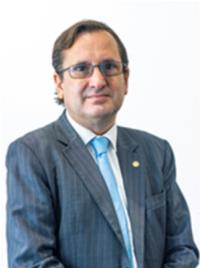

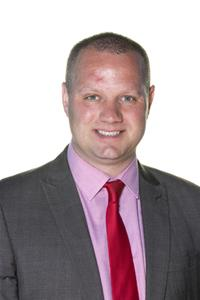

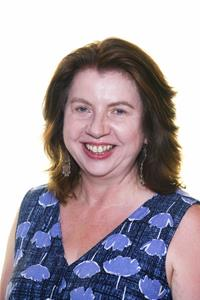
	First party	Second party	Third party
Leader	Paul Osborn	David Perry	Pamela Fitzpatrick
Party	Conservative	Labour	Arise
Leader's seat	Pinner	Marlborough	Marlborough
Last election	31 seats, 47.1%	24 seats, 40.7%	Did not exist
Seats before	31	23	0
Seats won	42	12	1
Seat change	▲11	▼12	▲1
Popular vote	88,771	44,095	6,078
Percentage	46.7%	23.2%	3.2%
Swing	▼0.4 pp	▼17.5 pp	New
	Fourth party	Fifth party	Sixth party
Leader	Savitha Prakash		Joseph Gaunt
Party	Reform	Green	Liberal Democrats
Leader's seat	Wealdstone South (contested)		Pinner (contested)
Last election	0 seats, 0.2%	0 seats, 3.3%	0 seats, 6.3%
Seats before	0	0	0
Seats won	0	0	0
Popular vote	21,676	18,718	10,864
Percentage	11.4%	9.8%	5.7%
Swing	▲11.2 pp	▲6.5 pp	▼0.6 pp
- Map of the results of the 2026 Harrow London Borough Council election. Conservatives in blue, Labour in red and Arise in purple.
Leader before election
Paul Osborn
Conservative
Leader after election
Paul Osborn
Conservative

The 2026 Harrow London Borough Council election took place on 7 May 2026. All 55 members of Harrow London Borough Council were elected. The elections took place alongside other 2026 United Kingdom local elections, including local elections in the other 31 London boroughs.

The Conservatives retained control of the council at this election and increased their majority.

== Background ==
London borough councils are the principal authorities in Greater London and have responsibilities including education, highways, social services, libraries, recreation, waste, environmental health, housing development and revenue collection. Some of the powers are shared with the Greater London Authority and the Mayor of London, which also manage passenger transport, police and fire.

Harrow voted in a Conservative council in its first election in 1964, and (excluding a brief three-year period of no overall control) Harrow remained Conservative-controlled till 1994. In that year, the Liberal Democrats became the biggest party on the council, although the council had no overall control. In 1998, Labour won a majority on Harrow Council for the first time.

Labour lost their majority in 2002 and the Tories retook the council in 2006, only to lose it to Labour again in 2010. Although there was a brief period of no overall control, Labour won majorities in 2014 and 2018.

In 2022, the Conservatives won a majority on Harrow Council, with 31 seats, while Labour were reduced to 24, defeating the incumbent Labour administration of twelve years, which had held a majority for eight of those years.

Both the Tories and Labour stood 55 candidates each in 2022, while the Liberal Democrats stood 28 candidates, Greens stood 14 candidates, and Reform stood 3 candidates. 9 candidates stood as independents.

The Conservatives took control of Harrow Council from Labour in 2022

In June 2023, Labour suspended a councillor, Phillip O'Dell, who became an independent. That same year, Mayor of London, Sadiq Khan, expanded the Ultra-Low Emission Zone to outer London (ULEZ). This was challenged in court by Bexley, Bromley, Harrow and Hillingdon councils, although the court challenge was defeated.

On 4 July 2024, the 2024 United Kingdom general election saw a Labour Party victory, with a total 411 seats. The Conservative Party saw a reduction in their total seats to 121, the lowest in their history, resulting in Keir Starmer becoming Prime Minister. However, Labour had won this landslide on less than 35 percent of the vote, and a rapid collapse in Labour (and also Conservative) polling combined with the surge of Reform UK, has led to some political commentators suggesting that the two-party system has ended or has come close to ending.

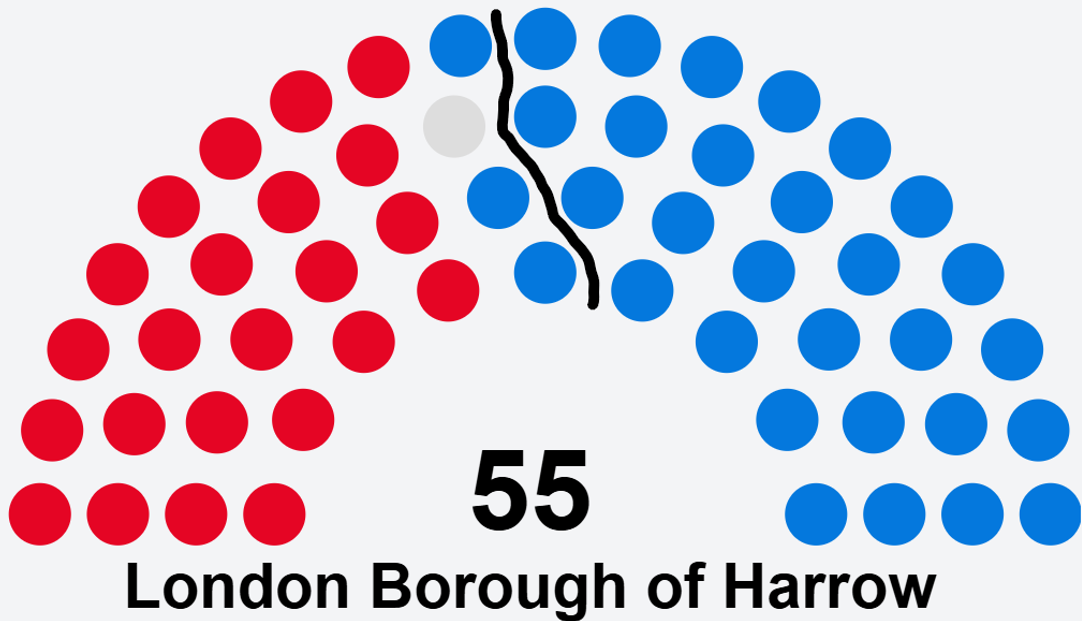
Council control of the London Borough of Harrow in 2022. The black line represents the majority line.

A new party, Arise, was formed in August 2025 with the backing of Jeremy Corbyn. This party is led by Pamela Fitzpatrick, a Labour councillor between 2014 and 2021, then an independent councillor until 2022, and an independent candidate for Harrow West in the 2024 general election. They have announced that they intend to target Marlborough ward.

== Council administration ==
In 2025, Harrow Times reported that the Conservative council invested £3 million into renovating council housing.

In 2026, the Conservatives increased Harrow council tax by 4.99%. Labour leader David Perry called the budget a "disaster for this Conservative administration," and claimed the Tories "voted to break their own election promises by raising council tax by the maximum 5 per cent for a fourth consecutive year." Harrow also has the third-highest council tax in London, having dropped down from the second-highest rate under the previous Labour administration at the 2022 election, which was run by Roxbourne councillor Graham Henson. The two councils that pay more council tax than Harrow are Lib Dem-run Kingston-upon-Thames and Conservative-run Croydon.

== Electoral system ==
London borough councils elect all of their councillors at once every four years. The previous election took place in 2022. The election will take place by multi-member first-past-the-post voting, with each ward being represented by two or three councillors. Electors will have as many votes as there are councillors to be elected in their ward, with the top two or three being elected, depending on the ward.

28 seats are needed for a majority on Harrow Council. Prior to the election, Conservatives had a majority and Labour needed an increase of 4 seats to gain a majority. The narrowest Labour defeats in 2022 were North Harrow, by 5 votes, Rayners Lane, by 15 votes, North Harrow, by 39 votes, and Edgware, by 49 votes. (North Harrow and Rayners Lane each have two councillors and Edgware has three.)

== Policies ==
The Harrow Conservatives have campaigned on their record leading the council, promising to protect one-hour free parking, crack down on houses in multiple occupation (HMOs), resist overdevelopment in the green belt, prosecute fly-tipping and maintain clean streets, invest more in road resurfacing and repairs, and protect the Freedom Pass and Winter Fuel Payments.

Harrow Labour has campaigned on six "key pledges", promising to freeze Council Tax in 2027, offer one-hour free parking, double residential cleaning to every two weeks, create an anti-social behaviour squad, introduce tougher penalties for fly-tippers and a private alleyway clearance scheme, and crack down on HMOs and rogue landlords.

The Harrow Liberal Democrats published a manifesto promising to improve waste management standards to reduce littering, build affordable homes that are built sustainably, make Harrow attractive for business, get an 'Outstanding' Ofsted rating for council-provided children's services, improve contacting the council, and make improvements to roads with an emphasis on active travel and safety.

The Harrow Green Party listed their priorities for Harrow as: improving access to GP services and supporting local schools, cracking down on bad landlords and raising standards for tenants, fixing poor housing and pushing for more affordable and accessible homes, cleaning up streets and tackling fly-tipping, protecting nature and biodiversity, protecting green spaces and making them safer, cleaning up rivers, supporting community wellbeing and local services, celebrating Harrow’s diversity and bringing communities together, and making the council more open, accountable and responsive.

Reform UK Harrow has promised to: tackle crime, drug dealing, antisocial behaviour and street drinking; protect one-hour free parking; stop overdevelopment and unlicensed HMOs; focus on repairing potholes to fix roads; make town centre improvements; and take public health seriously on spitting and tuberculosis.

Arise Harrow listed the issues of housing, education and SEN provision, poverty, community spaces, disability rights, social care, and having an ethical council as its priorities. Arise pledged to: stop the conversion of family homes into overcrowded HMOs, strengthen enforcement against rogue landlords, provide affordable homes by building council housing, investigate the high rate of school exclusions, ensure every child has a suitable school place, bring care homes under council control, introduce free adult social care at home with meals on wheels; create a not-for-profit community supermarket, divest the council from companies involved in human rights violations, such as in Palestine, Congo, and South Sudan, and repurpose empty buildings into community spaces.

26 candidates signed the Palestine Solidarity Campaign's 'Candidate Pledge for Palestine', pledging to "uphold the rights of the Palestinian people, stand up to Israel for its crimes of genocide and apartheid, and ensure their councils are not complicit, including through divestment of pension funds from complicit companies". This includes 12 Green candidates, 11 Arise candidates, and 3 Labour candidates.

== Campaign ==
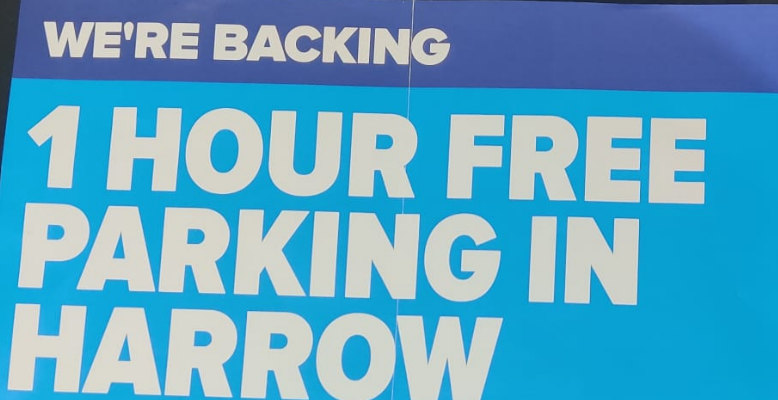
A leaflet from the Conservative Party

The Conservatives are led by Paul Osborn, Labour is led by David Perry, the Lib Dems are chaired by Joseph Gaunt, the Harrow Greens are volunteer-led, Reform is chaired by Savitha Prakash, and Arise was founded by Pamela Fitzpatrick.

Harrow Conservatives have campaigned on free parking in Harrow and other issues relating to public roads and streets. The Conservatives say they have "restored" the Westfield Lane pathway and introduced a scheme against fine-dodgers. They also cite their red route in Rayners Lane. They also have announced a resident contact centre on Gayton Road.

Will Jackson, a Conservative candidate in North Harrow, was deselected by the Conservatives after offensive social media comments, including saying independent MP Adnan Hussain should be bullied "back to Pakistan", and saying "Abolish all foreign MPs. Bye." in a reply to Your Party MP Zarah Sultana. The Conservative Party withdrew support for his campaign, describing his posts as "wholly unacceptable". Nathan Smith, a Conservative candidate in West Harrow, called for the "mass deportation" of Afghans living in the UK. He was suspended by the Conservatives. Both Jackson and Smith will remain as Conservative candidates on the ballot as the official deadline for nominations had passed.

Harrow Labour is focusing on more social issues, such as children's provisions. Labour have attacked the Conservatives for "waste" projects and for increasing council tax every year. They have also said that voting Labour sends Reform "a message." David Perry has attacked "vanity projects [...] that have cost taxpayers hundreds of thousands of pounds needlessly." Labour has also attacked the Conservatives for introducing evening and weekend parking charges in Council-owned car parks.

Reform leader Savitha Prakash has claimed that the United Kingdom is "regressing back to how things were in India." Prakash has claimed Reform activists in Harrow were subjected to abuse online.

The Harrow Liberal Democrats expressed "support for our Iranian residents in Harrow" and attacked "Tory economic vandalism."

Arise Harrow has been endorsed by Your Party, as one of multiple local independent groups it is supporting in the local elections.

== Analysis ==
London School of Economics professor Tony Travers has said that the "Conservatives will hold Harrow", and described it as one of the party's safest boroughs in London. A YouGov MRP poll has predicted a Conservative win in 2026 with the Conservatives winning the largest share of the popular vote, with Labour, Reform and the Greens within three points of each other.

== Previous council composition ==
After 2022 election		Before 2026 election		After 2026 election	
Party	Seats	Party	Seats	Party	Seats
Conservative	31	Conservative	31	Conservative	41
Labour	24	Labour	23	Labour	12
		Independent	1	Arise	1
				Independent	1

Although Will Jackson was a Conservative on the ballot paper, he had been deselected by the Tories before the election and the Harrow Council website says he is an independent.

== Election result ==
Council composition after the 2022 election

Council composition after the 2026 election

2026 Harrow London Borough Council election
Party	Candidates	Seats	Gains	Losses	Net gain/loss	Seats %	Votes %	Votes	+/−
Conservative	55	42	11	-	▲11	76.36	46.49	88,417	▲0.61
Labour	55	12	-	12	▼12	21.82	23.18	44,095	▼17.52
Arise	11	1	1	-	▲1	1.82	3.20	6,078	NEW
Reform	55	0	-	-	Steady	-	11.58	22,030	▲11.38
Green	32	0	-	-	Steady	-	9.84	18,718	▲6.54
Liberal Democrats	32	0	-	-	Steady	-	5.71	10,864	▼0.59

== Ward results ==
These are the final candidates listed in the Statement of Persons Nominated released on 10 April 2026. Labour and Reform each have a full slate of candidates. Some Labour candidates are standing under the 'Labour and Co-operative' banner. No independents are standing.

=== Belmont (2) ===
Belmont (2)
Party	Candidate	Votes	%
Conservative	Anjana Patel	1,845	66
Conservative	Mina Parmar	1,679	60
Green	Soody Kim	385	14
Labour	Navin Shah	383	14
Green	Sunita Mehta	380	14
Reform	Keval Radia	294	10
Labour	Yogeshwar Vasdev	286	10
Reform	Fathima Farzan	217	8
Liberal Democrats	Colin Webber	198	6
Conservative hold		Swing	
Conservative hold		Swing	

Mina Parmar is in charge of Housing.

=== Canons (2) ===
Canons (2)
Party	Candidate	Votes	%
Conservative	Ameet Jogia	1,991	70
Conservative	Amir Moshenson	1,535	54
Green	Roma Agrawal	408	14
Labour	Jim Lockie	386	14
Labour	Lesley Stackpoole	355	12
Reform	Marcello Borgese	339	12
Reform	Piibe Paide	238	8
Liberal Democrats	Sheila Levy	222	8
Liberal Democrats	Philip Levy	202	8
Conservative hold		Swing	
Conservative hold		Swing	

=== Centenary (3) ===
Centenary (3)
Party	Candidate	Votes	%
Conservative	Govind Bharadia	2,337	63
Conservative	David Ashton	2,334	63
Conservative	Salim Chowdhury	1,819	48
Labour	Hetal Patel	825	21
Labour	Andre Aalari	712	18
Green	Rebecca Lennon	685	18
Labour	Pratham Patel	682	18
Reform	Jayashree Patel	490	12
Reform	Robin Black	433	12
Reform	John Ogilvie	360	9
Liberal Democrats	Laurence Cox	302	9
Liberal Democrats	Sheila O'Reilly	268	6
Conservative hold		Swing	
Conservative hold		Swing	
Conservative hold		Swing	

David Ashton is in charge of Finance and Highways.

=== Edgware (3) ===
Edgware (3)
Party	Candidate	Votes	%
Conservative	Nicola Blackman	2,348	60
Conservative	Paresh Chudasama	2,157	54
Conservative	Yogesh Teli	1,895	48
Labour	Nitin Parekh	1,141	30
Labour	Devisha Patel	968	24
Labour	Hershil Patel	852	21
Green	Emma Raymond	634	15
Green	Richard Indrikut	593	15
Reform	Brian Pedro	375	9
Reform	Avi Orenstein	360	9
Liberal Democrats	Philip Hawkins	342	9
Reform	Suthventh Suralli	295	6
Conservative hold		Swing	
Conservative gain from Labour		Swing	
Conservative hold		Swing	

=== Greenhill (3) ===
Greenhill (3)
Party	Candidate	Votes	%
Conservative	Rhys Benjamin	975	36
Conservative	Alpeshkumar Patel	930	33
Conservative	Gabriele Montone	873	33
Labour	Aneka Shah-Levy	858	33
Labour	Ghazanfar Ali	853	30
Labour	Michael Borio	824	30
Green	Sophie Green	526	18
Green	Mike Blakeney	505	18
Green	Sobanon Narenthiran	455	18
Reform	Paul Bisnar	407	15
Reform	Jennifer Somers	344	12
Reform	Robert Selkirk	334	12
Liberal Democrats	Marshel Arasan	243	9
Conservative gain from Labour		Swing	
Conservative gain from Labour		Swing	
Conservative gain from Labour		Swing	

=== Harrow on the Hill (2) ===
Harrow on the Hill (2)
Party	Candidate	Votes	%
Conservative	Ellé Goodwin-Freeman	1,014	38
Conservative	Caroline Ojo	961	36
Labour	Viv Berwick	923	34
Labour	Stephen Hickman	876	32
Green	Patrick Thimbleby	478	18
Reform	Roger Clark	350	12
Reform	Philip Adrian Matthews	333	12
Liberal Democrats	Steve Carey	249	10
Liberal Democrats	Alexander Cunliffe	202	8
Conservative gain from Labour		Swing	
Conservative gain from Labour		Swing	

Stephen Hickman shadows Children and Education Services.

=== Harrow Weald (3) ===
Harrow Weald (3)
Party	Candidate	Votes	%
Conservative	Pritesh Patel	2,018	54
Conservative	Stephen Greek	2,005	54
Conservative	Michael Raven	1,928	51
Labour	Dan Anderson	826	21
Green	Ahsan Talib	770	21
Labour	Primesh Patel	752	21
Labour	Eden Kulig	724	18
Reform	Eric Bon	580	15
Reform	Cezar Mihai Damian	511	15
Reform	Cosmin Gilca	503	12
Liberal Democrats	Valerie Taylor	389	9
Liberal Democrats	Derek Hill	334	9
Conservative hold		Swing	
Conservative hold		Swing	
Conservative hold		Swing	

Stephen Greek is in charge of Performance, Communication and Customer Excellence. Eden Kulig shadows Performance, Communication and Customer Excellence.

=== Hatch End (2) ===
Hatch End (2)
Party	Candidate	Votes	%
Conservative	Matthew Goodwin-Freeman	2,013	66
Conservative	Susan Hall	1,876	60
Labour	Sue Anderson	612	20
Green	Mohinder Perihar	525	16
Labour	James Corbett	476	16
Liberal Democrats	Jeff Rollason	311	10
Reform	John Bugler	230	8
Reform	Adrian Mutti	147	4
Conservative hold		Swing	
Conservative hold		Swing	

=== Headstone (3) ===
Headstone (3)
Party	Candidate	Votes	%
Conservative	Raymond Grant	1,684	36
Conservative	Arunasalam Raj	1,517	33
Conservative	Meera Vadher	1,497	33
Labour	Simon Brown	1,343	30
Labour	Tasha Proctor	1,221	27
Labour	Sasi Suresh	1,127	24
Arise	Amaan Choudhry	1,078	24
Green	Rachel Leathers	948	21
Green	Ximena Poblete	704	15
Green	Esme Scarborough	667	15
Reform	Rohit Goel	568	12
Reform	Julian Wilson	531	12
Reform	Magan Kanjia	521	12
Liberal Democrats	Anthony Levene	317	6
Liberal Democrats	Pietro Rescia	203	3
Conservative gain from Labour		Swing	
Conservative gain from Labour		Swing	
Conservative gain from Labour		Swing	

Simon Brown shadows Adult Services and Public Health. Natasha Proctor is Deputy Leader of the Opposition and shadows Finance and Highways.

=== Kenton East (3) ===
Kenton East (3)
Party	Candidate	Votes	%
Conservative	Nitesh Hirani	2,818	72
Conservative	Chetna Halai	2,553	66
Conservative	Samir Sumaria	2,183	57
Labour	Rekha Shah	720	18
Labour	Dario Celaschi	700	18
Green	Boris Bose	630	15
Labour	Raj Vakesan	559	15
Reform	Rajni Patel	513	12
Reform	Michael Mantock	417	12
Reform	Namrata Shah	395	9
Liberal Democrats	Leslie Norman Moss	289	6
Conservative hold		Swing	
Conservative hold		Swing	
Conservative hold		Swing	

=== Kenton West (2) ===
Kenton West (2)
Party	Candidate	Votes	%
Conservative	Kanti Rabadia	2,017	66
Conservative	Ashish Halai	1,911	64
Labour	Sanjay Dighe	482	16
Labour	Chloe Smith	433	14
Green	Inigo Wilkins	431	14
Reform	Arindam Datta	274	10
Reform	Bhagyashree Singh	269	8
Liberal Democrats	Rajan Walia	208	6
Conservative hold		Swing	
Conservative hold		Swing	

=== Marlborough (3) ===
Marlborough (3)
Party	Candidate	Votes	%
Labour	David Perry	900	30
Arise	Pamela Fitzpatrick	878	30
Labour	Varsha Parmar	848	30
Labour	Asif Hussain	800	27
Conservative	Joyce Osborn	760	27
Conservative	Krish Sharma	731	24
Conservative	Jaydeep Patel	724	24
Arise	Sheila Guhadasan	722	24
Arise	Asha Mohamed	660	21
Green	Rowan Langley	654	21
Reform	Mihaela Stroe	313	12
Reform	Steve Watson	312	12
Liberal Democrats	Paolo Arrigo	294	9
Reform	Fathima Razick	238	9
Labour hold		Swing	
Arise gain from Labour		Swing	
Labour hold		Swing	

David Perry is Leader of the Opposition.

=== North Harrow (2) ===
North Harrow (2)
Party	Candidate	Votes	%
Conservative	Anola Savjani	1,319	44
Conservative	Will Jackson	1,230	40
Labour	Sechi Kailasa	966	32
Labour	James Watkins	890	30
Green	Simon Courtenage	612	20
Reform	Lesline Lewinson	354	12
Reform	Sagar Shukla	336	12
Liberal Democrats	Daniel Hawkes	310	10
Conservative hold		Swing	
Conservative hold		Swing	

Note: Will Jackson was deselected by the Conservatives after "wholly unacceptable" comments but was listed as the Conservative candidate on the ballot paper as the nomination deadline had passed.

=== Pinner (3) ===
Pinner (3)
Party	Candidate	Votes	%
Conservative	Paul Osborn	2,279	51
Conservative	Kuha Kumaran	2,169	51
Conservative	Norman Stevenson	2,136	48
Labour	Jeff Anderson	760	18
Green	Alexander Lee	760	18
Labour	Christine Robson	730	18
Green	Jacob Lyalls	632	15
Labour	Ben Wealthy	596	10
Liberal Democrats	Sarah Ismail	564	12
Reform	Jane Kowalczyk	548	12
Liberal Democrats	Joseph Gaunt	538	12
Reform	Anupam Pandey	538	12
Reform	Zbigniew Kowalczyk	492	12
Liberal Democrats	John Maddrell	351	9
Conservative hold		Swing	
Conservative hold		Swing	
Conservative hold		Swing	

Paul Osborn is leader of Harrow Council.

=== Pinner South (3) ===
Pinner South (3)
Party	Candidate	Votes	%
Conservative	Christopher Baxter	2,747	54
Conservative	Hitesh Karia	2,591	51
Conservative	Janet Mote	2,584	51
Labour	Rangdatt Joshi	945	18
Green	Rosa Gomez	919	18
Labour	Dinesh Murugesh-Warren	914	18
Labour	Hamda Ali	911	18
Liberal Democrats	Veronica Chamberlain	826	15
Reform	Vijay Singh	641	12
Reform	Herbert Crossman	633	12
Liberal Democrats	Nahid Boethe	605	12
Liberal Democrats	Paul Scott	556	12
Reform	Sangamithra Soundararajan	509	9
Conservative hold		Swing	
Conservative hold		Swing	
Conservative hold		Swing	

Hitesh Karia is in charge of Children and Education Services. Janet Mote is in charge of Community and Culture. Christopher Baxter is the Conservative chief whip.

=== Rayners Lane (2) ===
Rayners Lane (2)
Party	Candidate	Votes	%
Conservative	Thaya Idaikkadar	1,041	34
Labour	Krishna Suresh	945	30
Conservative	Metha Muthukumar	935	30
Labour	Ranjna Shiyani	757	24
Liberal Democrats	Chris Noyce	652	22
Liberal Democrats	Yogi Sockalingam	509	16
Green	Harshan Branauanathan	373	12
Green	Abigail Moore	346	12
Reform	Aeron Beckett	341	10
Reform	Dinesh Kannan	310	10
Conservative hold		Swing	
Labour hold		Swing	

Krishna Suresh shadows Community and Culture.

=== Roxbourne (2) ===
Roxbourne (2)
Party	Candidate	Votes	%
Labour	Graham Henson	1,092	44
Labour	Maxine Henson	947	38
Conservative	Mark Barreto	706	28
Conservative	Sunil Jaiswal	645	26
Green	Brandon Butler-Lewis	629	26
Reform	Emma Darbyshire	398	16
Reform	Noah Smith	346	14
Liberal Democrats	Thomas Yasin	243	10
Labour hold		Swing	
Labour hold		Swing	

Graham Henson shadows Housing.

=== Roxeth (3) ===
Roxeth (3)
Party	Candidate	Votes	%
Labour	Peymana Assad	1,450	36
Labour	Rashmi Kalu	1,426	36
Conservative	John Baxter	1,422	36
Conservative	Kumarasamy Indrachith	1,383	33
Labour	Jerry Miles	1,383	33
Conservative	Muthukumar Krishnasamy	1,356	33
Green	Swati Patel	861	21
Reform	Jyothy James	514	12
Arise	Kirsten Perkins	458	12
Reform	Viyan Parekh	425	9
Reform	Taruna Manchanda	424	9
Arise	Farid Mall	404	9
Arise	Yihya Sirhan	378	9
Liberal Democrats	Charles Boethe	367	9
Labour hold		Swing	
Labour hold		Swing	
Conservative gain from Labour		Swing	

=== Stanmore (3) ===
Stanmore (3)
Party	Candidate	Votes	%
Conservative	Marilyn Ashton	2,662	69
Conservative	Philip Benjamin	2,519	66
Conservative	Zak Wagman	2,270	60
Green	Margaret Murtagh	585	15
Reform	Joshua Selby	571	15
Reform	Caidian Johnson	504	12
Reform	Howard Koch	504	12
Green	Badri Wadawadigi	490	12
Labour	Jay Doshi	448	12
Labour	Jeff Gallant	376	9
Liberal Democrats	Jad Kanji	323	9
Labour	Michael Kinsey	321	9
Conservative hold		Swing	
Conservative hold		Swing	
Conservative hold		Swing	

Marilyn Ashton is the Deputy Leader of the Council.

=== Wealdstone North (2) ===
Wealdstone North (2)
Party	Candidate	Votes	%
Labour	Shahania Choudhury	820	34
Conservative	Ajay Agrawal	699	30
Labour	Ajay Maru	690	28
Conservative	Mayurika Chourdia	623	26
Green	Emma Stowell	473	20
Reform	Michael McCabe	350	14
Arise	Faran Khan	340	14
Reform	Paul II Bisnar	335	14
Arise	Dante Korjov	292	12
Liberal Democrats	Christopher Smith	151	6
Labour hold		Swing	
Conservative gain from Labour		Swing	

=== Wealdstone South (2) ===
Wealdstone South (2)
Party	Candidate	Votes	%
Labour	Angella Murphy-Strachan	570	30
Labour	Yusuf Yusuf	483	24
Reform	Savitha Prakash	453	24
Arise	Paul Crimmins	449	22
Conservative	Eileen Kinnear	444	22
Arise	Aghileh Djafari-Marbini	419	22
Conservative	Dimabo Wolseley	351	18
Reform	Charley Swarc	323	16
Green	Norman Uppard	286	14
Liberal Democrats	John Ingram	144	8
Labour hold		Swing	
Labour hold		Swing	

=== West Harrow (2) ===
West Harrow (2)
Party	Candidate	Votes	%
Labour	Sarah Butterworth	1,194	42
Labour	Mike Williams	1,034	36
Conservative	Jhala Janaksinh	719	24
Green	Sian Hume	695	24
Green	Pratik Doshi	679	24
Conservative	Nathan Smith	659	22
Reform	Bharatkumar Patel	367	12
Reform	Ian Price	323	12
Liberal Democrats	Alan Newman	152	6
Labour hold		Swing	
Labour hold		Swing	

Note: Nathan Smith was deselected by the Conservatives after "deeply concerning" social media posts but remained listed as the Conservative candidate on the ballot paper as the official deadline for nominations had passed.

== Result summary ==
Paul Osborn and the Harrow Conservatives emerged with an increased majority, gaining 11 seats from Labour despite a narrow drop in the Conservative voteshare. David Perry's Labour lost 12 seats, 11 to the Conservatives and one to Arise, led by Pamela Fitzpatrick. Labour had a 17.5% drop in vote share.

The Gallagher index gave the election a 23.92 score. All parties other than the Conservatives got a greater percentage of votes than seats.

Gallagher Index for the 2026 Harrow London Borough Council election
Party	Votes (%)	Seats (%)	Difference	Difference squared
Conservatives	46.70%	76.40%	29.7	882.09
Labour	23.20%	21.80%	-1.4	1.96
Reform UK	11.40%	0.00%	-11.4	129.96
Greens	9.80%	0.00%	-9.8	96.04
Liberal Democrats	5.70%	0.00%	-5.7	32.49
Arise	3.20%	1.80%	-1.4	1.96
Total of differences squared				1144.5
Total / 2				572.25
Square root of (Total / 2): Gallagher Index result				23.92

In the below table, the votes for each party per ward are the mean (average) of the votes for each of the party's candidates in the specific ward.

The vote and councillor numbers for the Conservatives include Will Jackson and Nathan Smith, both of whom were deselected by the Conservatives after "deeply concerning" social media posts but remained listed as the Conservative candidates on the ballot paper as the official deadline for nominations had passed.

Wards where the plurality of votes were won by Harrow Conservatives
Wards where the plurality of votes were won by Harrow Labour

		Harrow Conservatives		Harrow Labour		Reform UK Harrow		Harrow Greens		Harrow Liberal Democrats		Arise Harrow	
Ward	councillors	%	councillors	%	councillors	%	councillors	%	councillors	%	councillors	%	councillors
Belmont	2	63	2	12	0	9	0	14	0	3	0	0	0
Canons	2	62	2	13	0	10	0	7	0	8	0	0	0
Centenary	3	58	3	19	0	11	0	6	0	5	0	0	0
Edgware	3	54	3	25	0	8	0	15	0	3	0	0	0
Greenhill	3	34	3	32	0	13	0	18	0	3	0	0	0
Harrow on the Hill	2	37	2	33	0	12	0	9	0	9	0	0	0
Harrow Weald	3	53	3	20	0	14	0	7	0	9	0	0	0
Hatch End	3	63	2	18	0	6	0	8	0	10	0	0	0
Headstone	3	34	3	27	0	12	0	17	0	5	0	8	0
Kenton East	3	65	3	17	0	11	0	5	0	2	0	0	0
Kenton West	2	65	2	15	0	9	0	7	0	3	0	0	0
Marlborough	3	25	0	29	2	11	0	7	0	3	0	25	0
North Harrow	2	42	2	31	0	12	0	10	0	5	0	0	0
Pinner	3	50	3	15	0	12	0	17	0	11	0	0	0
Pinner South	3	52	3	18	0	11	0	6	0	13	0	0	0
Rayners Lane	2	32	1	27	1	10	0	19	0	12	0	0	0
Roxbourne	2	27	0	41	2	15	0	5	0	13	0	0	0
Roxeth	3	34	1	35	2	10	0	7	0	3	0	10	0
Stanmore	3	65	3	10	0	13	0	9	0	3	0	0	0
Wealdstone North	2	28	1	31	1	14	0	10	0	3	0	13	0
Wealdstone South	2	20	0	27	2	20	0	7	0	4	0	22	0
West Harrow	2	23	0	39	2	12	0	24	0	3	0	0	0
TOTALS:	55	46.7	42	23.2	12	11.4	0	9.8	0	5.7	0	3.2	1
