= Harrow West =

Parliamentary constituency in the United Kingdom, 1945 onwards

Coordinates: 51.585°N 0.364°W

- Borough constituency for the House of Commons
- Interactive map of boundaries from 2024
- Location within Greater London
- County: Greater London
- Electorate: 74,060 (March 2020)
- Major settlements: Harrow, Wealdstone, Headstone, Rayners Lane, South Harrow

Current constituency
- Created: 1945
- Member of Parliament: Gareth Thomas (Labour)
- Seats: One
- Created from: Harrow and Hendon
- During its existence contributed to new seat(s) of: Ruislip, Northwood and Pinner (as to Pinner), since 2010

Harrow West is a constituency (Note: A borough constituency (for the purposes of election expenses and type of returning officer)) (Note: As with all constituencies, the constituency elects one Member of Parliament (MP) by the first past the post system of election at least every five years.) in Greater London created in 1945 and represented in the House of Commons of the UK Parliament. Until 1997, it only returned Conservative MPs; since then, it has elected the Labour Co-operative MP Gareth Thomas on a fluctuating majority. Since 2010, this has been bolstered by the loss of Pinner from the seat and the gain of a favourable ward for Labour from Harrow East.

== Constituency profile ==
Harrow West is a mostly suburban constituency located on the outskirts of Greater London, around 10 miles (16 km) north-west of the centre of London. It covers the town of Harrow between Roxeth in the south and Wealdstone in the north. Harrow is the main commercial centre for the Metro-land suburbia of north-west London, which was developed during the early 20th century. The town contains Harrow School, a prestigious public boys' school, and also contains a campus of the University of Westminster. The constituency has average levels of wealth, although there are high levels of deprivation in Wealdstone, which contains most of the town's industrial sites. House prices in the constituency are below the London average.

The constituency is ethnically diverse. White people made up 34% of the population at the 2021 census, just under half of whom were of non-British origin; the area has a large Romanian community. Asians (primarily Indians) were the largest ethnic group, making up 45% of residents. The constituency has the largest concentration of Sri Lankans in the United Kingdom, and one of the largest Hindu populations, at 24%. Black people made up 9% of residents in 2021.

In general, residents of Harrow West are young and well-educated. Household income is above the London average, and a high proportion of residents work in retail and business administration. At the local council, most seats in the constituency are represented by the Labour Party with some Conservative representation in the west near Rayners Lane. An estimated 57% of voters in the constituency supported remaining in the European Union in the 2016 referendum, a similar proportion to the rest of London and higher than the nationwide figure of 48%.

== Political history ==
Summary of results

The Labour Party have held the seat since 1997, with the Conservative Party second-placed in each election. The 2015 result made the seat the 215th safest of the party's 232 seats (by majority percentage), and thus the 18th most marginal seat. Thomas's majority has ranged from 2.3% in 1997 to 26.4% in 2017.

Unlike Harrow East, it had always been won by the Conservative Party until Labour's landslide in 1997, when a swing of 17.5% was the eighth-highest swing in that election; it was the safest Tory seat lost to Labour. Its electorate produced another better than average result for Labour in 2001, with a swing from the Conservatives to Labour of 5.4%, bettered in only four seats out of 650. The 2005 challenge by future Conservative MP Mike Freer produced a pro-Conservative swing of 4.5%.

The 2010 inceptive seat saw a notional swing to the Tories in line with that nationally of 5.7%; in overall outcome the incumbent Labour MP's swing increased. The Harrow West and East seats now present as less marginal than they were in previous decades.

After a 1.1% swing to the Tories in 2015, the seat swung to Labour in 2017 by around 11%, with a local record number of votes for their incumbent candidate. At 34.4%, the Conservative vote share was the lowest in the seat's history, but the party received more votes in 2017 than in 2001 and 2010.

Other parties

UKIP, Liberal Democrat and Green Party candidates won less than 5% of the vote in 2015 and 2017, therefore forfeiting their deposits.

== Boundaries ==
The constituency was created for the 1945 general election when the Harrow constituency was split into the new seats of Harrow East and Harrow West. It was reduced in size for the 1950 general election, when a third Harrow seat, Harrow Central, was created. The Boundary Commission review before the 1983 general election saw the London Borough of Harrow contained in two seats, resulting in Harrow West gaining parts of the abolished Harrow Central.

=== Historic ===
Years	Local authority	Wards
1945–1950	Urban District of Harrow	Harrow-on-the-Hill and Greenhill, Headstone, Pinner North, Pinner South, Roxeth, West Harrow; part of Harrow Weald.
1950–1955	Urban District of Harrow	Pinner North and Hatch End, Pinner South, Roxbourne, Roxeth.
1955–1983	Municipal Borough of Harrow	Headstone, Pinner North and Hatch End, Pinner South, Roxbourne, Roxeth.
1983–2010	London Borough of Harrow	Harrow on the Hill, Hatch End, Headstone North, Headstone South, Pinner, Pinner West, Rayners Lane, Ridgeway, Roxbourne, Roxeth.
2010–2024	London Borough of Harrow	Greenhill, Harrow on the Hill, Headstone North, Headstone South, Marlborough (an easterly projection centred on Harrow and Wealdstone station and its compact urban hub), Rayners Lane, Roxbourne, Roxeth, West Harrow.

Map of boundaries 2010–2024

=== 2010 boundaries ===
Reviewing such representation in North London, the Boundary Commission for England (de facto), as is custom agreed by Parliament, altered the area's limits to avoid malapportionment, as London's housing and rates of occupancy have altered. The western border district, town or neighbourhood of Pinner went to a new cross-Borough seat, Ruislip, Northwood and Pinner, making its source, based on a ward breakdown of the last result, and mirrored by local election results, a stronger seat for Labour; this was coupled with the inclusion of Marlborough ward which had returned many Labour councillors since World War II.

=== Current ===
Following the 2023 review of Westminster constituencies, which came into effect for the 2024 general election, the constituency is composed of the following wards of the London Borough of Harrow:

- Greenhill, Harrow on the Hill, Headstone, Marlborough, North Harrow, Rayners Lane, Roxbourne, Roxeth, Wealdstone North, Wealdstone South, and West Harrow.

The new boundaries reflect the local authority boundary review which came into effect in May 2022. Wealdstone was transferred in from Harrow East. Minor losses to Ruislip, Northwood and Pinner.

== Members of Parliament ==
Election	Member	Party
1945	Norman Bower	Conservative
1951 by-election	Sir Albert Braithwaite	Conservative
1960 by-election	Sir John Page	Conservative
1987	Robert Hughes	Conservative
1997	Gareth Thomas	Labour, then Labour Co-op

== Election results ==
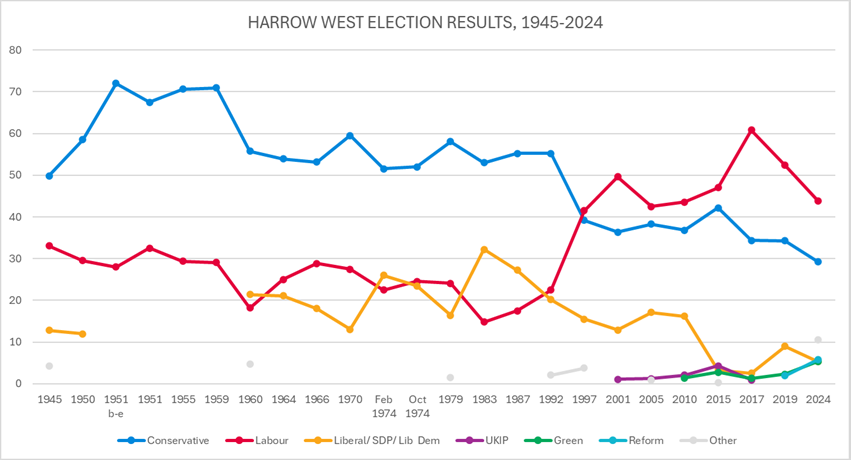
Election results 1945-2024

=== Elections in the 2020s ===
General election 2024: Harrow West
Party	Candidate	Votes	%	±%
Labour Co-op	Gareth Thomas	19,833	43.8	–9.3
Conservative	Abbas Merali	13,191	29.2	–5.6
Independent	Pamela Fitzpatrick	4,120	9.1	N/A
Reform	Michael Beavis	2,639	5.8	+4.0
Green	Rupert George	2,438	5.4	+3.3
Liberal Democrats	Chris Noyce	2,404	5.3	–2.9
Independent	Bharatkumar Patel	616	1.4	N/A
Majority		6,642	14.6	–8.6
Turnout		45,241	56.6	–10.6
Registered electors		79,902		
Labour hold		Swing	▼1.9	

=== Elections in the 2010s ===
2019 notional result
Party	Vote	%
Labour	26,437	53.1
Conservative	17,339	34.8
Liberal Democrats	4,107	8.2
Green	1,028	2.1
Brexit Party	882	1.8
Turnout	49,793	67.2
Electorate	74,060	

General election 2019: Harrow West
Party	Candidate	Votes	%	±%
Labour Co-op	Gareth Thomas	25,132	52.4	▼8.4
Conservative	Anwara Ali	16,440	34.3	▼0.1
Liberal Democrats	Lisa-Maria Bornemann	4,310	9.0	▲6.5
Green	Rowan Langley	1,109	2.3	▲1.0
Brexit Party	Richard Jones	931	1.9	N/A
Majority		8,692	18.1	▼8.3
Turnout		47,922	66.1	▼6.0
Registered electors		72,477		
Labour Co-op hold		Swing	▼4.2	

General election 2017: Harrow West
Party	Candidate	Votes	%	±%
Labour Co-op	Gareth Thomas	30,640	60.8	+13.8
Conservative	Hannah David	17,326	34.4	–7.8
Liberal Democrats	Christopher Noyce	1,267	2.5	–0.8
Green	Rowan Langley	652	1.3	–1.5
UKIP	Rathy Alagaratnam	470	0.9	–3.4
Majority		13,314	26.4	+21.6
Turnout		50,355	72.1	+5.2
Registered electors		68,797		
Labour Co-op hold		Swing	+10.8	

General election 2015: Harrow West
Party	Candidate	Votes	%	±%
Labour Co-op	Gareth Thomas	21,885	47.0	+3.4
Conservative	Hannah David	19,677	42.2	+5.4
UKIP	Ali Bhatti	2,047	4.3	+2.2
Liberal Democrats	Chris Noyce	1,567	3.3	–12.9
Green	Rowan Langley	1,310	2.8	+1.4
Independent	Kailash Trivedi	117	0.2	N/A
Majority		2,208	4.8	–2.0
Turnout		46,603	66.9	–0.7
Registered electors		69,644		
Labour Co-op hold		Swing	–1.1	

Note: From 2010 historically Conservative-strong Pinner formed part of the new seat Ruislip, Northwood and Pinner. The 2010 changes are not based on the 2005 result as the constituency underwent major changes.

General election 2010: Harrow West
Party	Candidate	Votes	%	±%
Labour Co-op	Gareth Thomas	20,111	43.6	−5.0
Conservative	Rachel Joyce	16,968	36.8	+6.4
Liberal Democrats	Christopher Noyce	7,458	16.2	−2.5
UKIP	Herbert Crossman	954	2.1	+0.8
Green	Rowan Langley	625	1.4	N/A
Majority		3,143	6.8	+2.6
Turnout		46,116	67.6	+3.2
Registered electors		68,554		
Labour Co-op hold		Swing	−5.7 (Note: Nominal, instead +seen, on new definition)	

=== Elections in the 2000s ===
General election 2005: Harrow West
Party	Candidate	Votes	%	±%
Labour Co-op	Gareth Thomas	20,298	42.5	−7.1
Conservative	Mike Freer	18,270	38.3	+1.9
Liberal Democrats	Christopher Noyce	8,188	17.1	+4.2
UKIP	Janice Cronin	576	1.2	+0.1
Independent	Berjis Daver	427	0.9	N/A
Majority		2,028	4.2	−9.0
Turnout		47,759	64.3	+1.3
Registered electors		74,133		
Labour Co-op hold		Swing	−4.5	

General election 2001: Harrow West
Party	Candidate	Votes	%	±%
Labour Co-op	Gareth Thomas	23,142	49.6	+8.1
Conservative	Daniel Finkelstein	16,986	36.4	−2.8
Liberal Democrats	Chris Noyce	5,995	12.9	−2.6
UKIP	Peter Kefford	525	1.1	N/A
Majority		6,156	13.2	+10.9
Turnout		46,648	63.0	−9.8
Registered electors		74,083		
Labour Co-op hold		Swing	+5.4	

=== Elections in the 1990s ===
General election 1997: Harrow West
Party	Candidate	Votes	%	±%
Labour	Gareth Thomas	21,811	41.5	+19.0
Conservative	Robert Hughes	20,571	39.2	−16.0
Liberal Democrats	Pash Nandhra	8,127	15.5	−4.67
Referendum	Herbert Crossman	1997	3.8	N/A
Majority		1,240	2.3	N/A
Turnout		52,506	72.8	−5.9
Registered electors		72,146		
Labour gain from Conservative		Swing	-17.5	

General election 1992: Harrow West
Party	Candidate	Votes	%	±%
Conservative	Robert Hughes	30,240	55.2	0.0
Labour	Claude Moraes	12,343	22.5	+5.0
Liberal Democrats	C. Noyce	11,050	20.2	−7.0
Liberal	G. Aitman	845	1.5	N/A
Natural Law	J. Argyle	306	0.6	N/A
Majority		17,897	32.7	+4.7
Turnout		54,784	78.7	+4.2
Registered electors		69,616		
Conservative hold		Swing		

=== Elections in the 1980s ===
General election 1987: Harrow West
Party	Candidate	Votes	%	±%
Conservative	Robert Hughes	30,456	55.2	+2.2
SDP	Stuart Bayliss	15,012	27.2	−5.0
Labour	Colin Bastin	9,665	17.5	+3.7
Majority		15,444	28.0	+7.2
Turnout		55,133	74.5	+2.1
Registered electors		74,041		
Conservative hold		Swing	+3.6	

General election 1983: Harrow West
Party	Candidate	Votes	%	±%
Conservative	John Page	28,056	53.0	−5.0
SDP	Stuart Bayliss	17,035	32.2	N/A
Labour	Albert Toms	7,811	14.8	−9.3
Majority		11,021	20.8	−13.2
Turnout		52,902	72.3	−6.4
Registered electors		73,151		
Conservative hold		Swing		

=== Elections in the 1970s ===
General election 1979: Harrow West
Party	Candidate	Votes	%	±%
Conservative	John Page	26,007	58.06	+6.07
Labour	Marie Catterson	10,794	24.10	−0.43
Liberal	Ronald Dick	7,350	16.41	−7.07
National Front	Timothy Bennett	646	1.44	N/A
Majority		15,213	33.96	+6.49
Turnout		44,797	78.72	+4.27
Registered electors		56,907		
Conservative hold		Swing		

General election October 1974: Harrow West
Party	Candidate	Votes	%	±%
Conservative	John Page	21,924	51.99	+0.44
Labour	M.P. Reynolds	10,342	24.53	+2.08
Liberal	R.E. Bell	9,903	23.48	−2.52
Majority		11,582	27.46	+1.91
Turnout		42,169	74.45	−8.34
Registered electors		56,641		
Conservative hold		Swing		

General election February 1974: Harrow West
Party	Candidate	Votes	%	±%
Conservative	John Page	23,950	51.55	−7.98
Liberal	R.E. Bell	12,081	26.00	+12.98
Labour	L. Wagner	10,430	22.45	−4.99
Majority		11,869	25.55	−6.54
Turnout		46,461	82.79	+10.04
Registered electors		56,122		
Conservative hold		Swing		

General election 1970: Harrow West
Party	Candidate	Votes	%	±%
Conservative	John Page	24,867	59.53	+6.40
Labour	Timothy P C Daniel	11,462	27.44	−1.43
Liberal	Jeffrey F Smith	5,440	13.02	−4.98
Majority		13,405	32.09	+7.83
Turnout		41,769	72.75	−7.40
Registered electors		57,418		
Conservative hold		Swing		

=== Elections in the 1960s ===
General election 1966: Harrow West
Party	Candidate	Votes	%	±%
Conservative	John Page	22,660	53.13	−0.78
Labour	Christopher Hubert Beaumont	12,313	28.87	+3.88
Liberal	Harry Charles Seigal	7,676	18.00	−3.10
Majority		10,347	24.26	−4.65
Turnout		42,649	80.15	+0.32
Registered electors		53,210		
Conservative hold		Swing		

General election 1964: Harrow West
Party	Candidate	Votes	%	±%
Conservative	John Page	23,132	53.91	−17.01
Labour	Kenneth W Childerhouse	10,725	24.99	−4.09
Liberal	Arnold E. Bender	9,055	21.10	N/A
Majority		12,407	28.92	−12.93
Turnout		42,912	79.83	+0.59
Registered electors		53,756		
Conservative hold		Swing		

1960 Harrow West by-election
Party	Candidate	Votes	%	±%
Conservative	John Page	18,526	55.77	−15.15
Liberal	John M. Wallbridge	7,100	21.38	N/A
Labour	Philip J. Jenkins	6,030	18.15	−10.93
New Conservative	John E. Dayton	1,560	4.70	N/A
Majority		11,426	34.39	−7.45
Turnout		33,216	61.60	−17.64
Registered electors		53,756		
Conservative hold		Swing		

=== Elections in the 1950s ===
General election 1959: Harrow West
Party	Candidate	Votes	%	±%
Conservative	Albert Braithwaite	30,512	70.92	+0.29
Labour	Philip J. Jenkins	12,512	29.08	−0.29
Majority		18,000	41.84	+0.58
Turnout		43,024	79.24	−1.95
Registered electors		54,295		
Conservative hold		Swing		

General election 1955: Harrow West
Party	Candidate	Votes	%	±%
Conservative	Albert Braithwaite	31,321	70.63	+3.16
Labour	Richard Leonard	13,024	29.37	−3.16
Majority		18,297	41.26	+6.33
Turnout		44,345	81.19	−2.57
Registered electors		54,616		
Conservative hold		Swing		

General election 1951: Harrow West
Party	Candidate	Votes	%	±%
Conservative	Albert Braithwaite	26,549	67.47	+8.93
Labour	Leslie Littlewood	12,802	32.53	+3.02
Majority		13,747	34.93	+5.90
Turnout		39,351	83.76	−2.94
Registered electors		46,979		
Conservative hold		Swing		

1951 Harrow West by-election
Party	Candidate	Votes	%	±%
Conservative	Albert Braithwaite	22,826	72.00	+13.46
Labour	Leslie Littlewood	8,877	28.00	−13.46
Majority		13,949	44.00	+14.97
Turnout		31,703	68.00	−18.70
Registered electors		46,599		
Conservative hold		Swing		

General election 1950: Harrow West
Party	Candidate	Votes	%	±%
Conservative	Norman Bower	23,744	58.54	+8.69
Labour	Leslie Littlewood	11,971	29.51	−3.52
Liberal	Philip Montague Syrett	4,846	11.95	−0.88
Majority		11,773	29.03	+12.21
Turnout		40,561	86.70	+8.09
Registered electors		46,781		
Conservative hold		Swing		

=== Elections in the 1940s ===
General election 1945: Harrow West
Party	Candidate	Votes	%	±%
Conservative	Norman Bower	28,617	49.85	
Labour	Joan Thompson	18,961	33.03	
Liberal	Hubert Winthrop Young	7,364	12.83	
Common Wealth	Hugh Lawson	2,462	4.29	
Majority		9,656	16.82	
Turnout		57,404	78.61	
Registered electors		73,024		
Conservative win (new seat)				

== See also ==
- List of parliamentary constituencies in London
