= Pamela Fitzpatrick =

British political activist

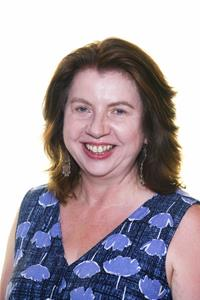

Member of Harrow Council for Marlborough
- Incumbent
- Assumed office 7 May 2026

Member of Harrow Council for Headstone South
- In office 22 May 2014 – 5 May 2022

Personal details
- Party: Arise (since 2025)
- Other political affiliations: Labour (until 2021); Independent (2021–2025); Your Party (since 2025)

Pamela Fitzpatrick is a British political activist, trade unionist, and councillor who is the founder of the Arise party, a Harrow Councillor, and the director of the Peace & Justice Project. Fitzpatrick has served as a Harrow Councillor for Marlborough since 2026, and previously served as a councillor for Headstone South from 2014 to 2022. She stood unsuccessfully as the Labour candidate for Harrow East in the 2019 general election and as an independent candidate for Harrow West in the 2024 general election.

Pamela Fitzpatrick is the director of the left-wing Peace & Justice Project and Collective groups, and has been involved in the founding of Your Party. Fitzpatrick founded the Arise party in 2025 and was elected as an Arise candidate in Marlborough ward in the 2026 Harrow London Borough Council election.

== Career ==
Pamela Fitzpatrick worked in the voluntary sector giving legal advice for more than 30 years. She has worked for Child Poverty Action Group, the Family Rights Group, and the National Association of Citizens Advice Bureaux, and has been a charity trustee and school governor. She is the director of the Harrow Law Centre, a law centre founded in 2010 to provide civil legal advice, and later support to victims of crime and criminal legal aid.

== Political career ==
=== Labour Party ===
Pamela Fitzpatrick was a member of Harrow London Borough Council for the ward of Headstone South from 2014 to 2022, and was elected in the 2014 and 2018 Harrow Council elections as a councillor for the Labour Party. She was briefly suspended from the Labour Party in 2016 for alleged rudeness in a meeting. She served as the Chair of the Planning Committee on the council and the Chair of the Harrow Labour Group prior to her expulsion in 2021.

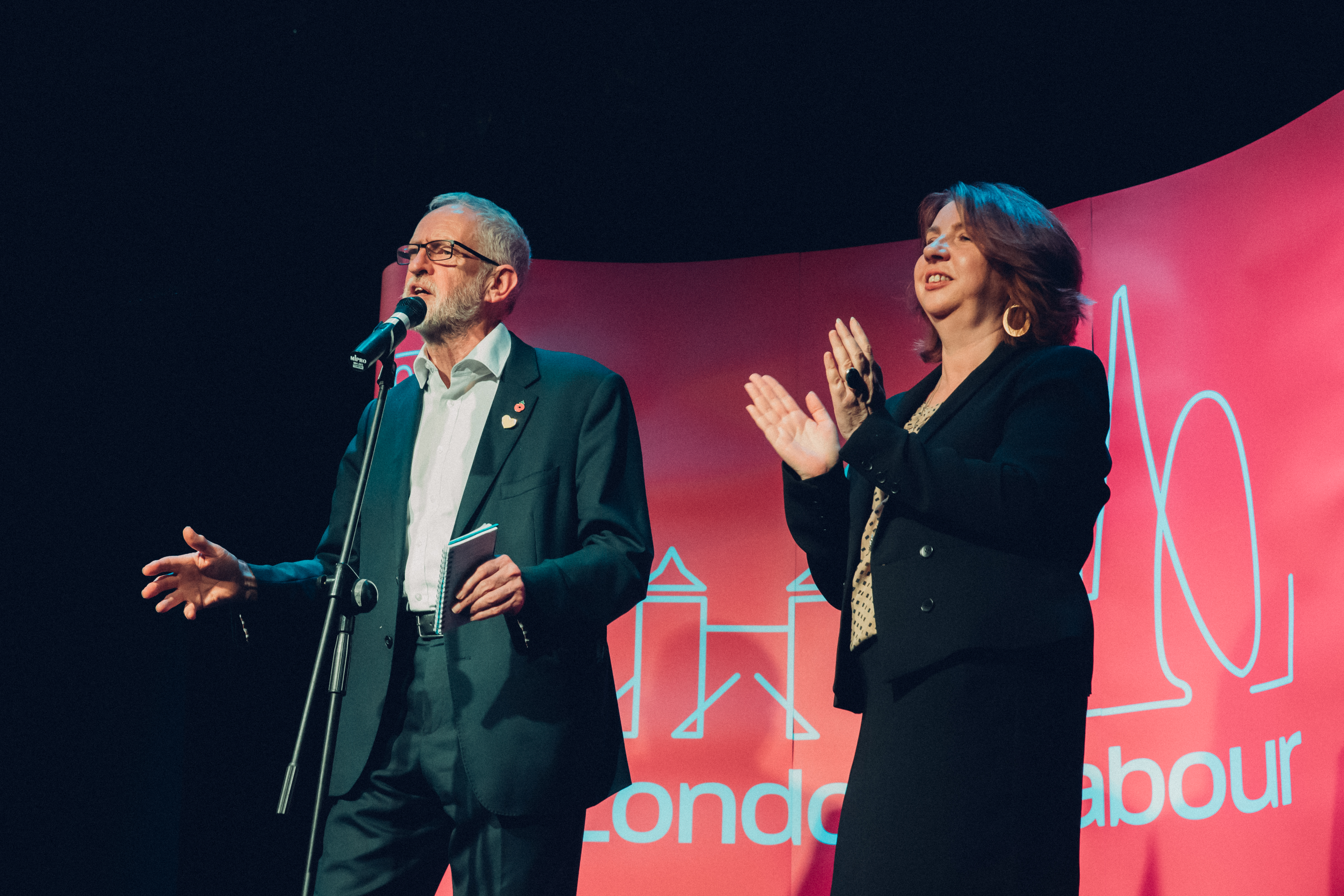
Fitzpatrick speaking alongside Jeremy Corbyn at a campaign event in Harrow East in 2019.

Fitzpatrick was selected in February 2018 as the Labour candidate for Harrow East at the 2019 general election, narrowly beating another Labour councillor, Kiran Ramchandani. She was endorsed by Momentum, Unite the Union, Owen Jones, and John McDonnell. Fitzpatrick campaigned against austerity measures and cuts to benefits, and named housing, health, education, and crime as major problems voters were discussing in doorstep conversations. OnLondon identified tensions between Fitzpatrick and parts of the local Jewish and Indian communities as important in the election. Fitzpatrick finished second behind incumbent Conservative MP Bob Blackman.

Fitzpatrick applied to be the General Secretary of the Labour Party in 2020, and was long-listed and interviewed but was not selected on the final shortlist. In June 2021, she was elected to Labour's National Women's Committee.

==== Expulsion from Labour ====
In August 2021, Fitzpatrick received a letter from the Labour Party saying that she was to be expelled from the party for allegedly being a supporter of the Marxist group Socialist Appeal, which was banned by the party's National Executive Committee in July 2021, after she was interviewed by the group's newspaper with the same name in 2020 about her bid to be General Secretary. She denied that she was a supporter of the group and accused the party's new leadership under Keir Starmer of unfairly applying rules retrospectively and giving disproportionately harsh sanctions, saying she was targeted as part of a wider campaign to remove socialists from the Labour Party. Fitzpatrick was expelled from Labour in November 2021, and served as an independent councillor until the 2022 Harrow Council election, which she did not stand in. She subsequently appealed her expulsion, but received no communication from the party.

=== Activities as an independent ===
In December 2020, following his expulsion from the Labour Party, former Labour Party leader Jeremy Corbyn announced the creation of the Peace & Justice Project, a new organisation with the goal of supporting social justice, peace, and human rights in the UK and around the world. Fitzpatrick was appointed as a director of the project alongside Corbyn in 2023.

Fitzpatrick is also a director of Collective, a left-wing group formed in 2024 with the goal of creating a new left-wing political party and grassroots movement. In this capacity she was involved in discussions around the founding of what became Your Party, as an ally of Corbyn, disagreeing with the initial announcement and the proposal of co-leaders versus Corbyn as interim leader.

Pamela Fitzpatrick stood as an independent candidate in Harrow West in the 2024 general election. She campaigned on providing affordable housing, fully funding local services, promoting workers' rights, renationalising railway, mail, water, and energy services, recognising Palestine, and ending arms sales to countries violating human rights. Fitzpatrick finished third with 9.1% of the vote, behind incumbent Labour MP Gareth Thomas and a Conservative candidate.

=== Arise party ===
In 2025, Pamela Fitzpatrick founded Arise, a left-wing local political party contesting elections in the London Borough of Harrow. Arise was registered to the Electoral Commission on 13 June 2025, with named Fitzpatrick as its leader. The party was launched at meeting on 27 August led by Fitzpatrick and attended by Jeremy Corbyn, who endorsed the party. Fitzpatrick has described Arise as an "openly socialist party", and as a local "grassroots" initiative that would coordinate with Your Party on a national level. Arise was endorsed by Your Party ahead of the 2026 local elections.

In the 2026 Harrow London Borough Council election, Arise stood 11 candidates in 5 wards, and received 3% of the total vote. Pamela Fitzpatrick stood in Marlborough ward and was elected as the party's first and only councillor, taking one of the three council seats from Labour. This was the first time since 2014 that a candidate other than from the Conservatives or Labour was elected in Harrow. She received 878 votes, or 29.8%.

== Personal life ==
Fitzpatrick was born in Harlesden to parents of Irish descent and moved to Harrow as a child. She has lived in Marlborough ward, Harrow since 2000.

== See also ==
- Arise (political party)
- Your Party (UK)
- Peace & Justice Project
- Collective (organisation)
- Karie Murphy
- Jeremy Corbyn
