= Arise (political party) =

Local political party in England

- Leader: Pamela Fitzpatrick
- Founded: 13 June 2025
- Headquarters: 85 Salisbury Road, London, HA1 1NX
- Ideology: Socialism
- National affiliation: Your Party
- Colors: Pink
- Slogan: We deserve better
- Harrow Council: 1 / 55

Website
- ariseparty.org.uk

Arise is a local political party in the London Borough of Harrow, England. It was founded in 2025 by Pamela Fitzpatrick, who is the party's sole councillor on Harrow London Borough Council.

== History ==
Arise was registered to the Electoral Commission on 13 June 2025. The party is named after a line from the Percy Bysshe Shelley poem The Masque of Anarchy. The party was launched at meeting on 27 August led by Pamela Fitzpatrick, a former Labour Harrow councillor and the director of the Peace & Justice Project. The launch was attended by Jeremy Corbyn MP, the former Leader of the Labour Party and founder of Your Party, who endorsed the party. Fitzpatrick described Arise as a local "grassroots" initiative that would coordinate with Your Party on a national level.

In the 2026 Harrow London Borough Council election, Arise stood 11 candidates in 5 wards. The party received 3% of the vote and elected its first councillor, Pamela Fitzpatrick, in Marlborough ward, who became the first non-Labour or Tory councillor elected in Harrow since 2014.

Arise has been endorsed by Your Party, as one of multiple local independent groups it supports in local elections.

== Ideology and policy ==
Pamela Fitzpatrick described Arise as an "openly socialist party" in an interview with The Canary.

Arise lists the issues of housing, education and SEN provision, poverty, community spaces, disability rights, social care, and having an ethical council as its priorities.

In the 2026 local elections, Arise pledged to: stop the conversion of family homes into overcrowded HMOs, strengthen enforcement against rogue landlords, provide affordable homes by building council housing, investigate the high rate of school exclusions, ensure every child has a suitable school place, bring care homes under council control, introduce free adult social care at home with meals on wheels, create a not-for-profit community supermarket, divest the council from companies involved in human rights violations, such as in Palestine, Congo, and South Sudan, and repurpose empty buildings into community spaces.

All 11 Arise candidates in the 2026 local elections signed the Palestine Solidarity Campaign's 'Candidate Pledge for Palestine', pledging to "uphold the rights of the Palestinian people, stand up to Israel for its crimes of genocide and apartheid, and ensure their councils are not complicit, including through divestment of pension funds from complicit companies".

== See also ==
- Your Party (UK)
