= North Harrow =

Suburban area in Northwest London

Coordinates: 51.58394°N 0.36324°W

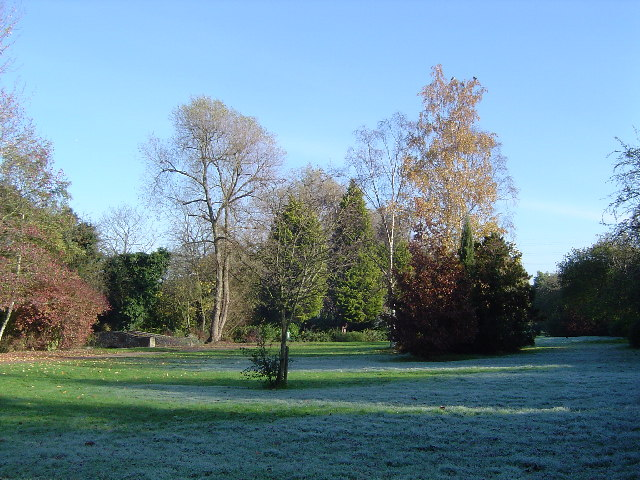
- Yeading Brook Open Space

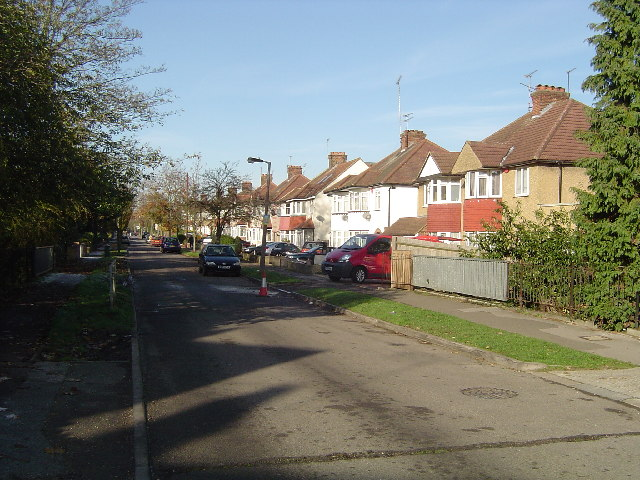
- Northumberland Road; Illustration of average North Harrow residential housing stock

- Location within Greater London
- OS grid reference: TQ135885
- Ceremonial county: Greater London
- Region: London
- Country: England
- Sovereign state: United Kingdom
- Post town: HARROW
- Postcode district: HA1, HA2
- Dialling code: 020
- Police: Metropolitan
- Fire: London
- Ambulance: London
- UK Parliament: Harrow West

North Harrow is a suburban area of North West London, situated north-west of central Harrow within the London Borough of Harrow. Its residential roads have expanded from North Harrow tube station, a station on the Metropolitan line of the London Underground which is one stop away from Harrow-on-the-Hill station in Harrow town centre. Before North Harrow tube station was opened and the suburb developed, the area was known as Hooking Green.

North Harrow's statistics exceed the London average in terms of safety, affluence and quality of education of its schools. In the area, there is predominantly low-rise, low-density, high floor space housing; there is substantial parkland in the neighbourhood such as on all sides of Headstone Manor, Yeading Brook Open Space and miniature railway and sports ground in adjoining pasture grasslands of Pinner Park, contrasted with diverse amenities, particularly in the areas of the tube station, Imperial Drive and along Pinner Road, including a post office, Tesco Express, a selection of restaurants, take-aways and cafés and independent specialist shops. The area is also served by North Harrow Library.

About 800m north of the tube line is a 14th-century moated manor house, Headstone Manor, which serves to support the area's excellence in sport with public grounds on all sides as well as Harrow Museum and Heritage Centre, which is based in Headstone Manor Recreation Ground. The Heritage Centre chronicles Harrow's historical past and runs many special events and exhibitions throughout the year.

== Sport at Headstone Manor ==
The Headstone Manor Recreation Ground is used for training for the Headstone Manor Youth football club for age groups ranging from Under 8's to the Senior team. The most successful Headstone Manor team to date was managed by Nigel 'Trout Pout' Trout, between 2000 and 2005. The team won the Middlesex Cup an unprecedented three years in a row (2001/02, 2002/03 and 2003/04) and became the first team to appear in four consecutive finals, losing the 2000/01 final. The team also won the Harrow Youth League Cup three times (2000/01, 2001/02 and 2003/04) and the Harrow Youth League Premier Division twice (2000/01 and 2001/02) therefore achieving the 'treble' in their 2001/02 season.

== Amenities ==
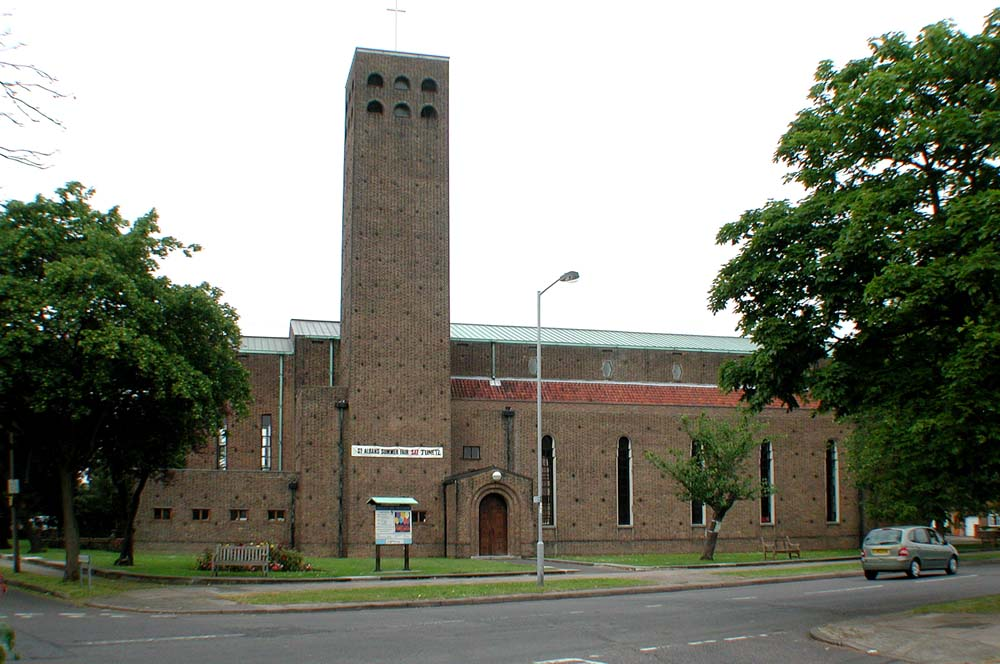
Parish Church of St Alban

There are several schools in the area and churches. Among the churches is the 1930s-built Anglican church south of the railway line to serve the area, which survived quite sporadic destruction in World War II, dedicated to St Alban, whose cathedral is not far away to the north in St Albans.

== Politics ==
North Harrow is part of the Harrow West constituency for elections to the House of Commons of the United Kingdom. The parliamentary constituency of Harrow West contains North Harrow along with West Harrow and central Harrow, is represented by Labour Party (UK) MP Gareth Thomas.

North Harrow is part of the North Harrow ward for elections to Harrow London Borough Council.
