= 1894 Wealdstone Urban District Council election =

Local election in England

The 1894 Wealdstone Urban District Council election took place in December 1894 to elect members of Wealdstone Urban District Council in London, England. The council had been created under the Local Government Act 1894 (56 & 57 Vict. c. 73), and the whole council was up for election. Of the 12 members elected, 9 had been endorsed by an organisation known as the Ratepayers’ Defence Association. Balk, who was elected, and Woodhead, who wasn't, received the endorsement of a public meeting of workmen.

== Election result ==
Wealdstone Urban District Council 12 seats Electorate: 652
| Party | Candidate | Votes | % | ±% |
|---|---|---|---|---|
| Ratepayers’ Defence Association | William A. Jepson | 200 | 51.7 | |
| Ratepayers’ Defence Association | James Smither | 190 | 49.1 | |
| Independent | Charles Tyler | 167 | 43.2 | |
| Independent | Frederick Judge | 162 | 41.9 | |
| Ratepayers’ Defence Association | Fred Gullett | 145 | 37.5 | |
| Ratepayers’ Defence Association | Joseph T. Draper | 144 | 37.2 | |
| Ratepayers’ Defence Association | Edwin J. Powell | 137 | 35.4 | |
| Ratepayers’ Defence Association | Matthew Dymock | 133 | 34.4 | |
| Independent Labour | Robert Balk | 115 | 29.7 | |
| Ratepayers’ Defence Association | Frederick King | 107 | 27.6 | |
| Ratepayers’ Defence Association | George Lander | 104 | 26.9 | |
| Ratepayers’ Defence Association | George R. Rogers | 103 | 26.6 | |
| Ratepayers’ Defence Association | Henry W. Job | 91 | 23.5 | |
| Independent | Miss Edith B. Joyner | 87 | 22.5 | |
| Independent Labour | John C. Woodhead | 87 | 22.5 | |
| Ratepayers’ Defence Association | James Winter | 80 | 20.7 | |
| Independent | Henry Drury | 78 | 20.2 | |
| Independent | Richard D. Rixon | 74 | 19.1 | |
| Independent | George E. Farnhill | 72 | 18.6 | |
| Independent | Thomas Smerdon | 70 | 18.1 | |
| Ratepayers’ Defence Association | Walter H. Collins | 60 | 15.5 | |
| Independent | John E.A. Durham | 22 | 5.7 | |
| Turnout | | 387 | 59.4 | |
