= 1960 Harrow West by-election =

UK Parliamentary by-election

The 1960 Harrow West by-election was held on 17 March 1960 due to the suicide of the incumbent Conservative MP, Sir Albert Braithwaite. It was won by the Conservative candidate John Page.

Harrow West by-election, 1960
Party	Candidate	Votes	%	±%
Conservative	John Page	18,526	55.77	−15.15
Liberal	John M. Wallbridge	7,100	21.38	New
Labour	Philip J. Jenkins	6,030	18.15	−10.93
New Conservative	John E. Dayton	1,560	4.70	New
Majority		11,426	34.39	−7.45
Turnout		33,216	61.60	−17.64
Registered electors		53,756		
Conservative hold		Swing		

The Liberal Party was said to be "much encouraged" by their share of the vote according to the acting chair of the Liberal standing committee Mark Bonham Carter who also noted his party had not contested the constituency for ten years. Liberal leader Jo Grimond said that "the result strengens our claim that what the nation wants is a Liberal alternative.

The by-election took place on the same day as the Brighouse and Spenborough by-election which saw the Conservatives gain that seat from the opposition Labour Party. Morgan Phillips, Labour's General Secretary, blamed the poor results on negative press coverage arguing that "a tremendous effort" had been undertaken to develop "an unfavourable image of the party" adding that in his view "Newspaper space seems to have been allocated on political, rather than on news value."
