= Hatch End High School =

Location
- Headstone Lane; Harrow; London, HA3 6NR; England; 51°36′22″N 0°21′24″W

Information
- Former name: Blackwell School
- Type: Single academy trust school
- Motto: Students thrive in this school
- Established: 1948; 78 years ago
- Department for Education URN: 137204 Tables
- Ofsted: Reports
- Head teacher: Marianne Jeanes
- Gender: Mixed
- Enrolment: 1,400
- Colours: Black and red
- Website: www.hatchend.harrow.sch.uk

Hatch End High School is an eight-form entry 11–18 co-educational academy school in Harrow, North London, England, in the United Kingdom. It was originally named Blackwell School.

The school's examination results at GCSE and A-Level have consistently been in the top 10% of all schools nationally in recent years.

Hatch End High School forms part of the Harrow Sixth Form Collegiate. There are 1100 students across Years 7 to 11 and there are over 300 students in the Sixth Form.

== History ==
- 1948/49 – Blackwell School opened.
- 1953 – The Great Hall, was completed on site.
- 1974 (September) – Hatch End High School Comprehensive Education was introduced in Harrow. Blackwell was renamed.
- 1995 – Hatch End's grounds were used to film the TV series The Demon Headmaster.
- 2004 – Round House (drama centre) opened.
- 2006 – Hatch End sixth Form was established.
- 2010 – Hatch End Sixth Form, a new modern building, was opened by Gareth Thomas, local politician and alumnus of the school.
- 2011 – Hatch End High school gained academy status.
- 2013 – M.U.G.A. opened (floodlit AstroTurf).
- 2014 – Hatch End Radio Studio opened and allowed students to host a radio station during 35 minute breaks. The show originally won a world record 'Longest Marathon Radio Show (Team)', by staff members Chris Firth and Richard Parker, the show lasted 74 hours.
- 2019 – Hatch End High School opened their new school building.

== Governance ==
The school is a single academy trust school.

Hatch End High School forms part of the Harrow collegiate Sixth Form. There are over 300 students in the Sixth Form.

The school and Headteacher also play a role in the Harrow Alternative Provision Academy Trust (The Jubilee Academy) and Harrow Academies Trust.

== Curriculum ==
The trust has chosen to run a two-year Key Stage 3 programme where it teaches all the elements of the National Curriculum: that is the core subjects plus a broad range of the Arts, Humanities, Modern Foreign Languages and Design and Technology.This is so the youngster are not excluded from future Ebac possibilities. They then benefit from a three-year Key Stage 4.

In Key Stage 4 they, the students, continue following the National Curriculum Subjects in English; Maths; Science; Physical Education; Religious Education and Personal, Citizenship, Social and Health Education (PCSHE). They choose options from History or Geography or both and a Modern Foreign Language enabling them to gain accreditation in All students will study either History or Geography with the option to study both if desired and the majority of students continue with a Modern Foreign Language enabling them to gain English Baccalaureate accreditation in the five subject areas needed. These subjects are accredited at the end of Year 11. One option subject will be examined at the end of Year 10. Eight GCSEs are expected and 10 GCSEs possible. There is flexibility here to allow for late incomers, with some modules taught in mixed year groups.

The sixth form, or Key Stage 5 is run in cooperation with other schools in the Harrow Collegium, students are offered A level courses and BTEC at the multiple sites.

== Buildings ==
=== Current buildings ===
These were the result of a 2019 rebuild. It is part of the Government's second phase of the Priority Schools Building Programme (PSBP). (Note: The PSBP was launched in July 2011 and is procured by the Education Funding Agency on behalf of the Department for Education. It aims to raise standards in education by a combination of investment in buildings and ICT.) The site is compact and limited by housing and other schools. The new building involved removing some mature trees, and fronting onto Headstone Lane. The main block is three storey high and about five classrooms long. (18.0m in depth and 50.5m) It provides 18 general teaching classrooms, 3 ICT classrooms, 2 Food Technology rooms, 1 special education needs seminar room . There are 4 departmental staff work rooms, a staff social room, 4 small group rooms and 4 two person admin offices and toilets and storage for staff and pupils.

=== The Great Hall and Round House ===
- 1953 – The Great Hall, was completed on site
  - Architects: John and Elizabeth Eastwick-Field
  - Builders: The Anglo-Scottish Construction Company Ltd
  - Consultant Engineers: F. J. Samuely and Partners Ltd
- 2017 – The Great Hall was refurbishment, as a 600-seater performance venue
- 2004 – Round House (drama centre) opened.

=== 1950 buildings ===
These buildings have been totally demolished. They consisted of four ranges of single storey buildings and placed around a central tarmac-ed playground. The site was entered from Tilotson Road from the north. There was also a two-storey sixth form block completed in 2006 to the south with the Great Hall and Round House.

- 1950 – The Main School Building (originally built for 900 pupils)
  - Architect: Cecil G Stillman, Middlesex County Council.
  - Builders: W. S. Try Ltd. High Street, Cowley.
  - Consultant Engineers: F. J. Samuely BSc (Eng)

== Notable alumni ==
- Elvis Bwomono – professional footballer playing for St Mirren
- Loick Essien – Rapper
- Philip Glenister – actor
- Kristian Leontiou – singer
- Tushar Makwana - radio presenter
- Tyrick Mitchell – professional footballer capped twice by England at senior level
- Olufela Olomola - professional footballer
- Paul Rose – screenwriter and journalist
- Melissa Suffield – actress
- Gareth Thomas – politician
- Jerome Thomas – professional footballer
