= John Page (MP for Harrow West) =

British politician

Sir Arthur John Page (16 September 1919 – 31 October 2008), known as Sir John Page, was a British Conservative politician.

The son of Sir Arthur Page, sometime Chief Justice of Burma, Page was educated at Harrow and Magdalene College, Cambridge. He was a sales manager and chairman of the Bethnal Green and east London Housing Association.

Page first campaigned for Parliament for the 1959 general election in Eton and Slough, but without success. He was elected as member of parliament (MP) for Harrow West at a by-election in 1960, and represented the district until he retired from Parliament at the 1987 general election. In the House of Commons he was chairman of the Conservative Parliamentary Labour Affairs Committee from 1970 to 1974 (secretary 1960–61, vice-chairman 1964–69). He was knighted in 1984.

Page was the father of Nathaniel Page, who in 1985 married Katherine Asquith, daughter of Julian Asquith.

Parliament of the United Kingdom
| Preceded by Albert Braithwaite | Member of Parliament for Harrow West; 1960–1987 | Succeeded by Robert Hughes |
