= Wealdstone =

Coordinates: 51.595697°N 0.335190°W

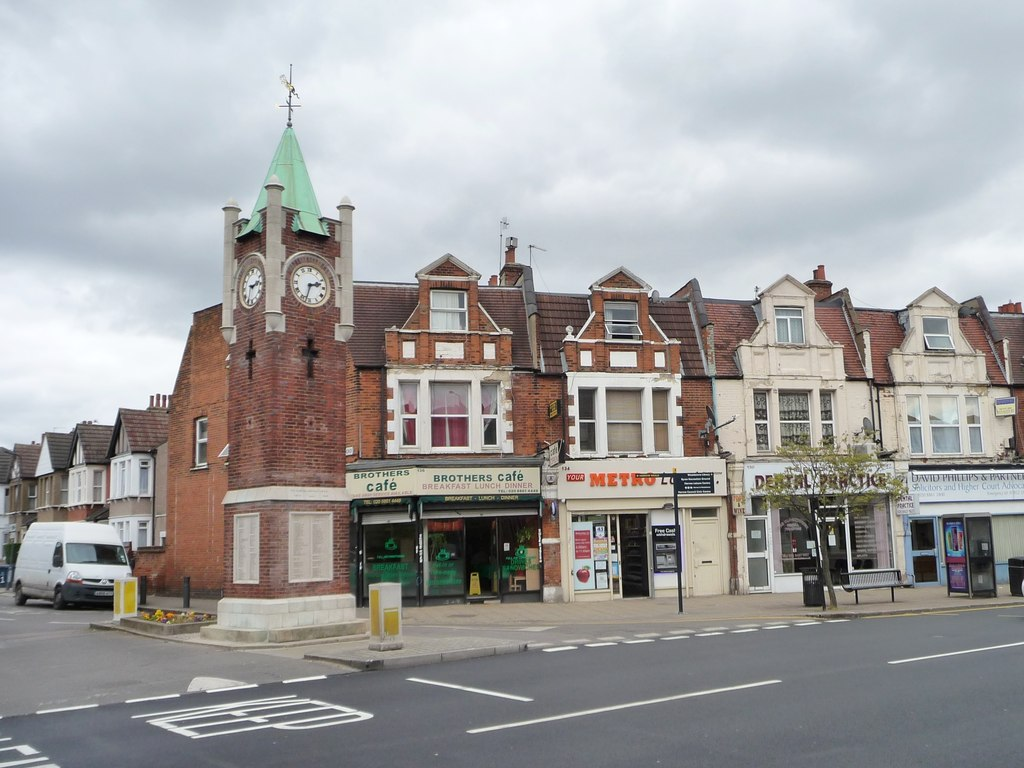
- Wealdstone war memorial and clock alongside a parade in the northern part of High Street

- Location within Greater London
- Population: 11,394 (2011 Census. Ward)
- OS grid reference: TQ155895
- London borough: Harrow
- Ceremonial county: Greater London
- Region: London
- Country: England
- Sovereign state: United Kingdom
- Post town: HARROW
- Postcode district: HA3
- Dialling code: 020
- Police: Metropolitan
- Fire: London
- Ambulance: London
- UK Parliament: Harrow West
- London Assembly: Brent and Harrow

Wealdstone (/ˈwiːldstoʊn/) is a district located in the centre of the London Borough of Harrow, England. It is located just north of Harrow town centre and is south of Harrow Weald, west of Belmont and Kenton, and east of Headstone. The area accommodates most of Harrow's industrial and business designated land. Wealdstone was the location of the Kodak Harrow factory; it closed in 2016. Wealdstone is centred on the High Street, and much traffic is bypassed from here by the George Gange Way flyover built in 1996. Its western boundary is formed by Harrow View, across which Headstone Manor lies, whereas on the east is Byron Park and the Belmont Trail. Harrow & Wealdstone station and the council offices are located at its southern end.

== Etymology ==
The eponymous Weald Stone is a sarsen stone, positioned to mark the then boundary between the parishes of Harrow and Harrow Weald. It is located outside the Bombay Central restaurant, which was built as a public house (previously known as the Weald Stone Inn and prior to that, the Red Lion), outside 328 High Road, Harrow Weald.

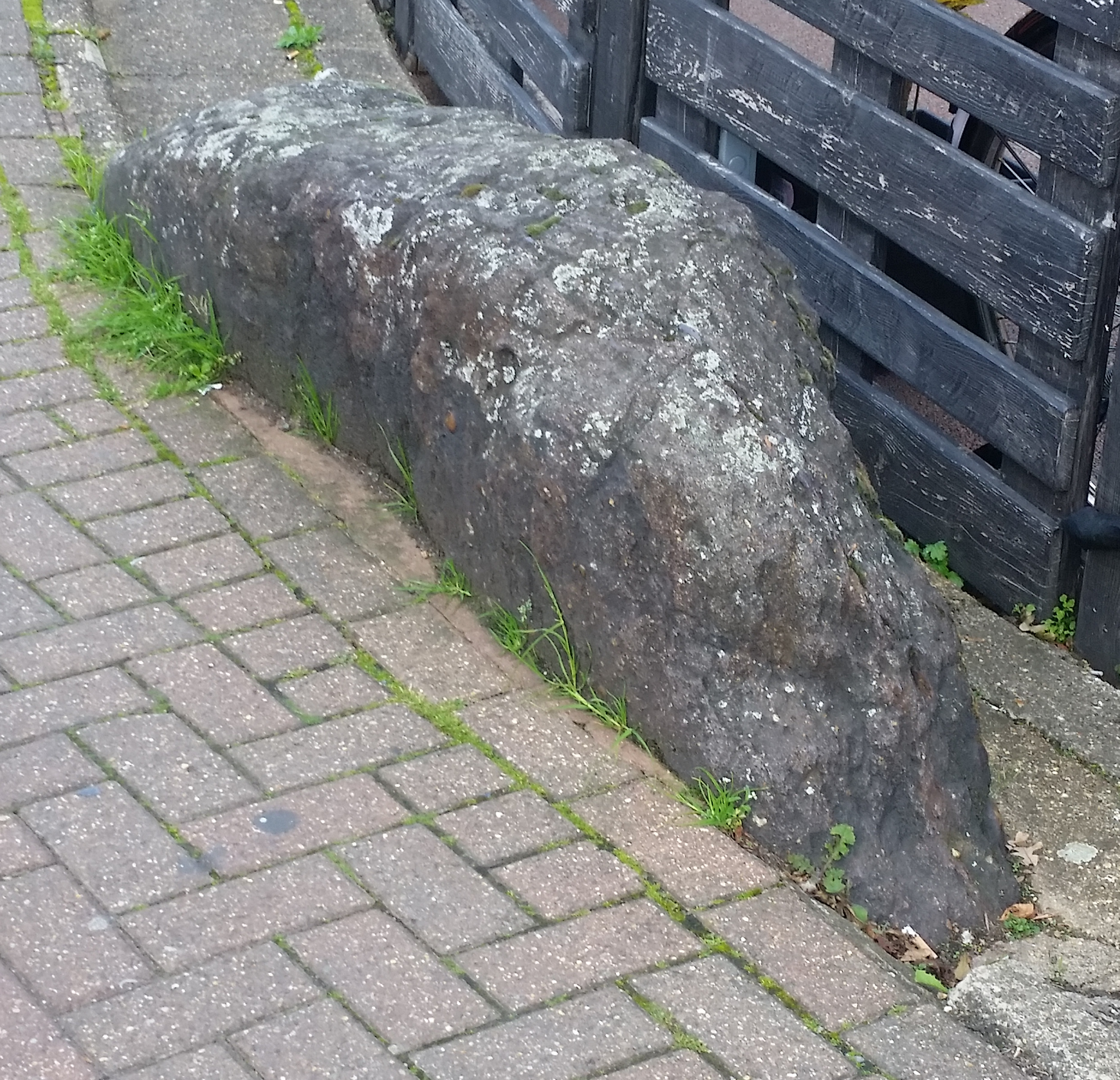
Close up of The Weald Stone from the south

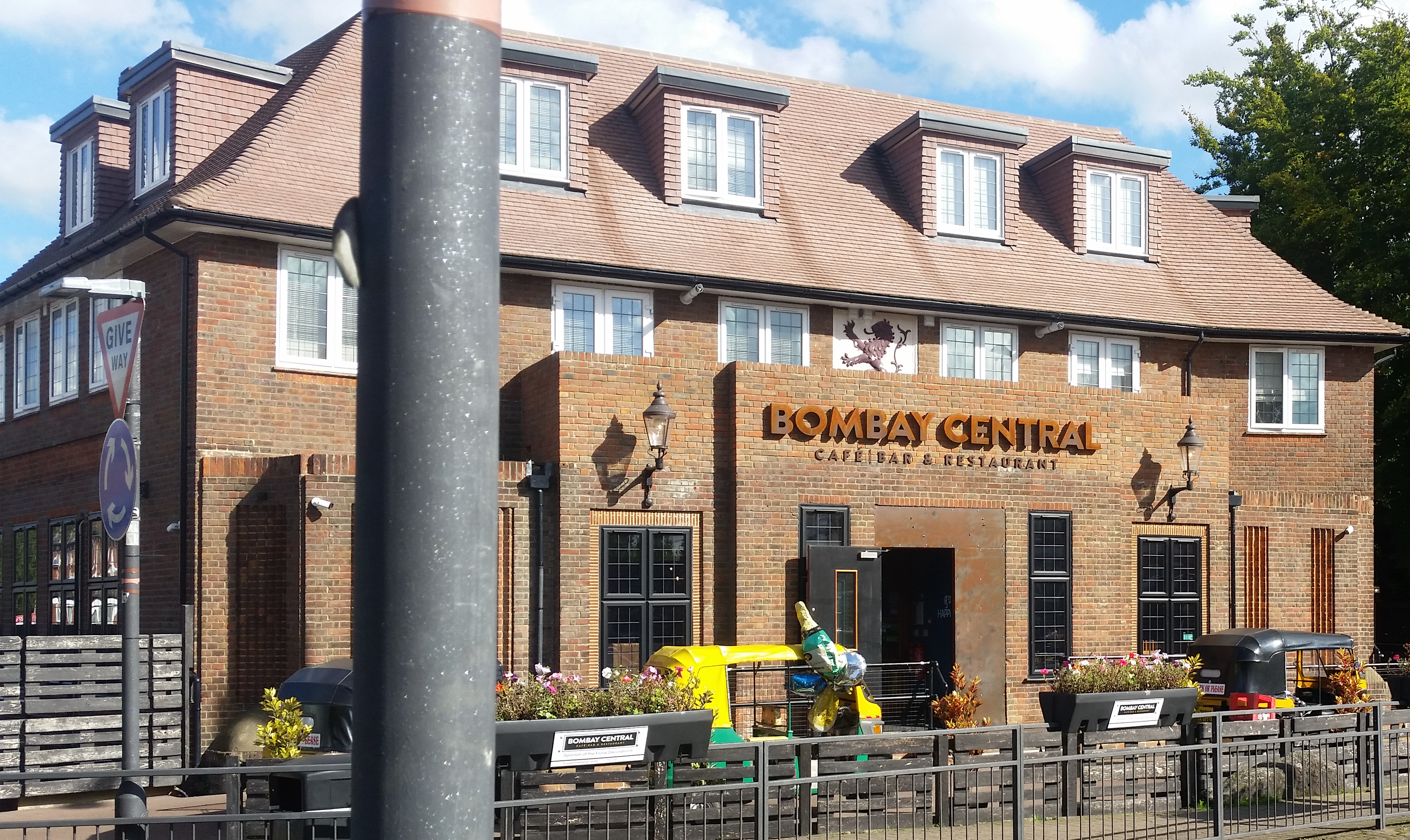
The Weald Stone is in the bottom right of this picture of Bombay Central

== History ==
Wealdstone Urban District was created under the Local Government Act 1894 in 1894, on 31 December 1894 Wealdstone became a civil parish being formed from part of Harrow on the Hill, on 1 April 1934 the district and parish were abolished and merged with Harrow and Wembley. At the 1931 census (the last before the abolition of the parish), Wealdstone had a population of 27,019.

Much of the housing stock in central Wealdstone consists of Victorian and Edwardian terraces along with new flatted developments in High Street and George Gange Way.

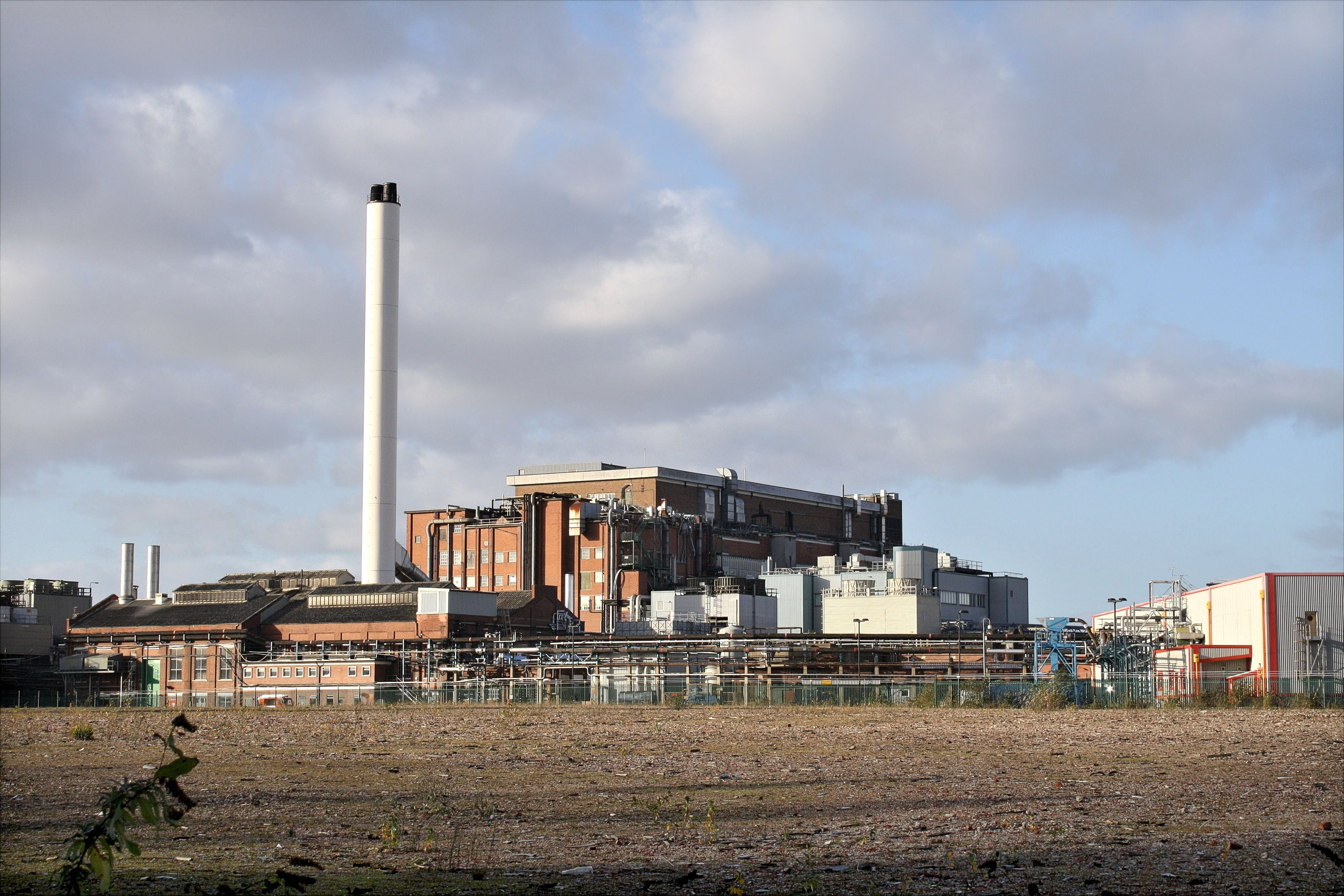
The former Eastman Kodak factory on Headstone Drive, Wealdstone. It was Kodak's first outside the U.S., opened in 1891 and closed 2016, now demolished.

The Kodak Harrow factory was located in Wealdstone until its closure in 2016. This, along with nearby factories of Winsor & Newton (a facility of the artists' materials company which closed in 2010), Whitefriars Glass and Hamilton Brush Works, turned Wealdstone into Harrow's industrial centre. Waverley Industrial Estate still contains industry today. A Her Majesty's Stationery Office factory in the area was demolished in 1996 and now replaced by Harrow Crown Court.

At the junction of Graham Road with High Street was located the former Herga Cinema which opened in 1939 but closed in 1951. The building was gutted by fire in the early 1960s, later renovated and variously used throughout its later life as commercial premises until Harrow Council confirmed in 2018 that the building was to be demolished and replaced by flats.

The bypass of Wealdstone High Street was completed in late 1996. In 1997, supermarket chain Asda announced a grand scheme for a superstore in Wealdstone involving a redevelopment of the town centre which included the demolition of 60 small business establishments. The project divided opinion and was scrapped, but in a more modest scheme was revived later that year. Following lengthy negotiations and consultations, Asda dropped the plan in 1999 blaming Harrow Council. Local traders were reportedly "beleaguered" by the high street's decline since the opening of the bypass and the abandonment by Sainsbury's of a new supermarket project in 2001, which traders hoped would help revitalise Wealdstone. Later that year, Harrow Council secured funding for a community centre including a library at the site of a former Safeway. It opened in 2004 as the Wealdstone Centre. Asda eventually opened a smaller supermarket on the high street in 2015.

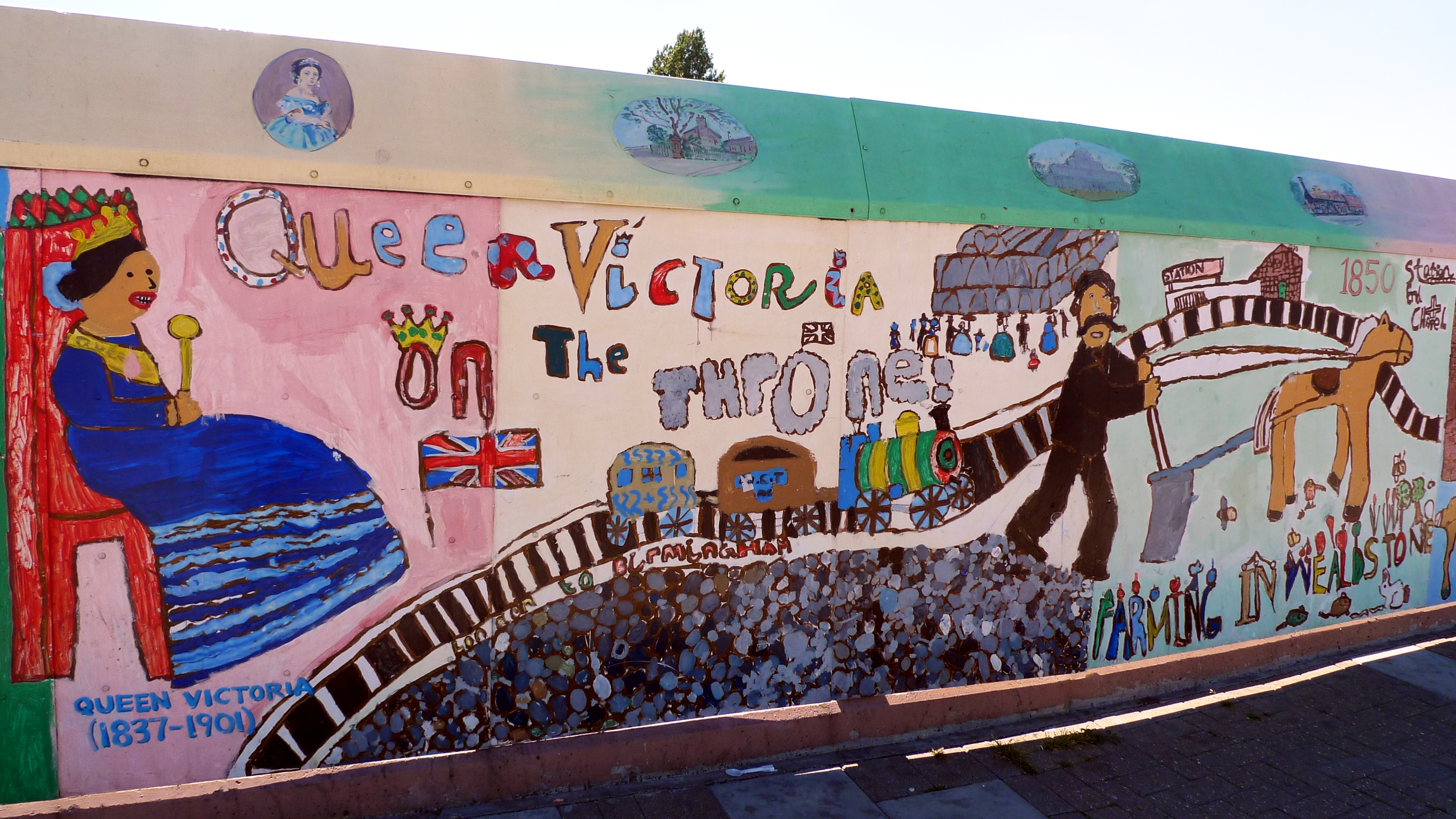
A mural of Queen Victoria on the sidewalls of Harrow & Wealdstone station

A mural commemorating Queen Victoria was painted on the railway bridge in 2004 by local children.

=== Crime and policing ===
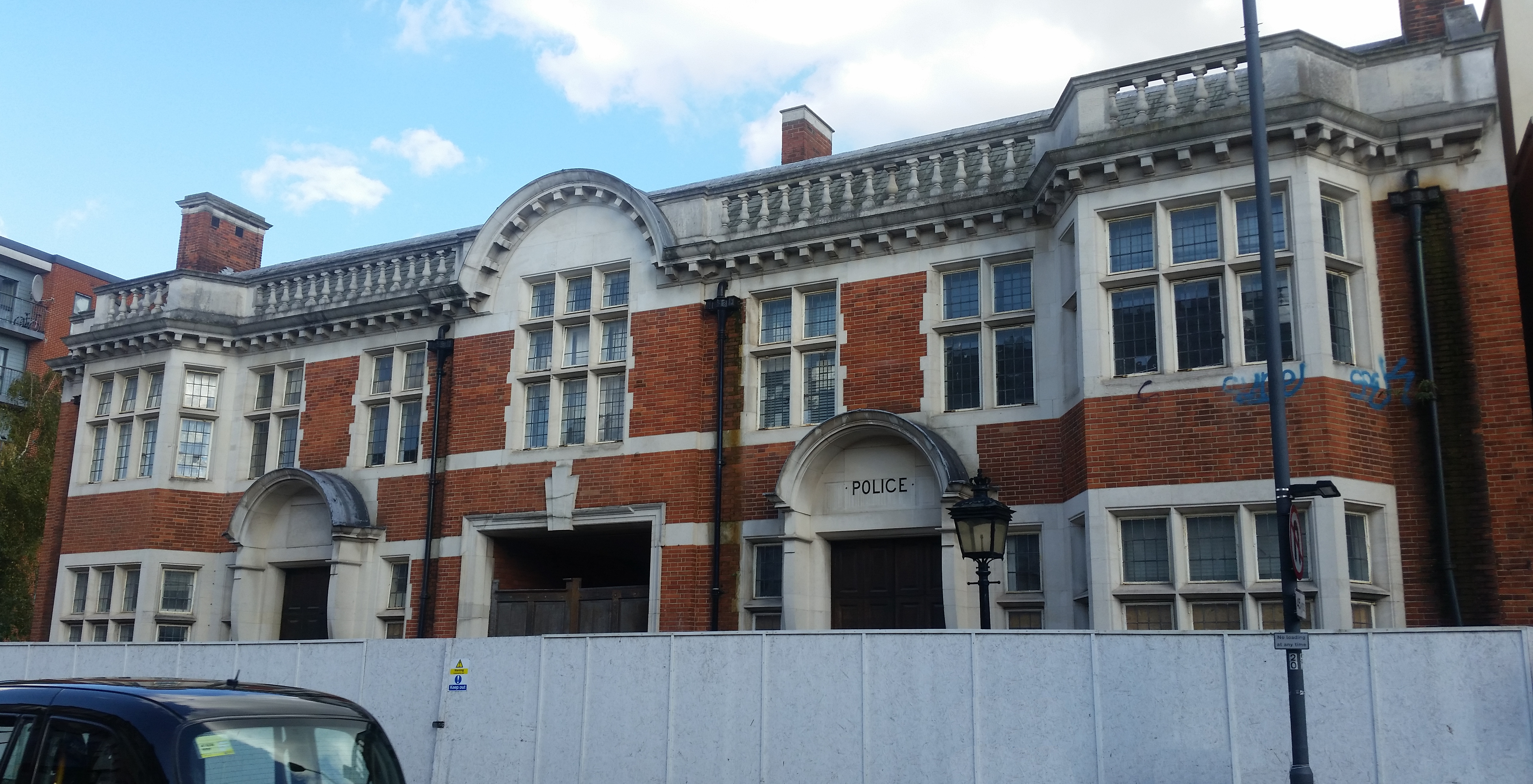
Wealdstone Police Station in 2017

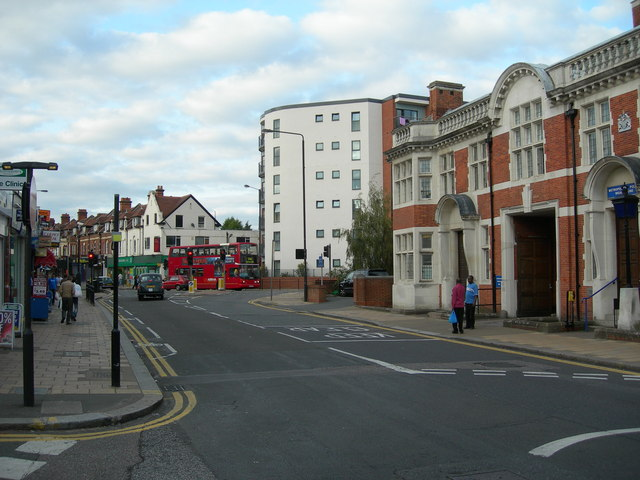
High Street showing police station on the right in 2006

Possibly the most prominent building in Wealdstone is the former Police Station in the high street. The site was built in 1909 and has been Grade II listed since 1998. It is known for its distinctive style and features.

In 2003, plans by the Metropolitan Police to close Wealdstone police station was met with by protests and opposition in the community. A petition against the closure received 200 signatures. The station eventually remained open, but the issue arose again in 2008 and 2011 amid police plans to sell the building. While the station was no longer open to the public, it still housed the Anti-Social Behaviour Partnership team.

In May 2011, Navin Shah representing Brent and Harrow in the London Assembly asked then-Mayor of London Boris Johnson about his thoughts on the closure. Johnson responded:

Let's be clear - the closing of a police station is always a very difficult decision. People understandably are reassured by the physical presence of a corner police station. But the Met's real estate portfolio is ageing, and modern policing is these days more reliant on resources other than just bricks and mortar.

Gareth Thomas, MP for Harrow West, launched a petition to save the station. However, opponents were unsuccessful and the station was closed.

Wealdstone formerly had the highest crime rate in the borough, as the town suffered from antisocial behaviour and drug crime, higher than the borough's average. However, the Wealdstone Antisocial Behaviour Partnership (WASP), started by the Metropolitan Police to tackle crime in the town in 2010, saw impressive results with crime figures below the average in the borough. Wealdstone was one of only four Harrow wards to show a fall in reported Crime from April 2015 to March 2016.

== Sport ==
The Harrow Leisure Centre is located in Wealdstone and facilities include swimming, badminton, snooker, martial arts and a gym run by Harper's Fitness. One of the country's oldest remaining skate parks, Harrow Skate Park, is next to the leisure centre. The park is a major centre of the British skateboarding scene and draws visitors from all over the country.

In 1903, Wealdstone FC played at the College Farm ground situated in Locket Road, then later played in Belmont Road before moving in 1922 to Lower Mead, which was located behind the Dominion/ABC cinema (now closed) on Station Road, prior to its controversial sale to Tesco for retail development in 1991. After many years of without a home stadium of their own, Wealdstone FC is now based nearby in Ruislip, having abandoned plans to relocate within the borough of Harrow at Prince Edward Fields, Canons Park, now the home stadium of Barnet FC. Former players include Stuart Pearce, Vinnie Jones and Jermaine Beckford.

== Demography ==
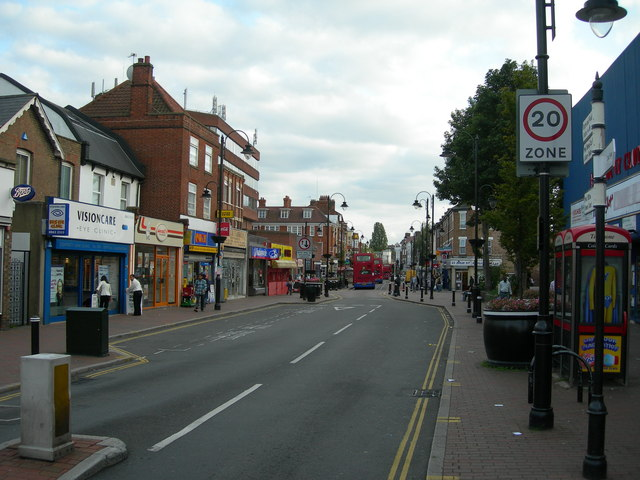
Wealdstone High Street (2006)

Wealdstone is the youngest ward in the borough of Harrow. It is also the most deprived part of the borough.

According to the 2011 census, the largest ethnic group in Wealdstone ward is White British (25%), followed by 20% Indian and 13% Other Asian.

== Governance ==
For elections to Harrow London Borough Council, Wealdstone is represented by two wards; Wealdstone North and Wealdstone South. Both wards are in the Harrow West constituency, currently represented by Labour MP Gareth Thomas. However smaller parts of the district west of High Street and north of Locket Road are in the Harrow Weald ward, which is in Harrow East constituency and represented by Conservative MP Bob Blackman.

== Other amenities ==
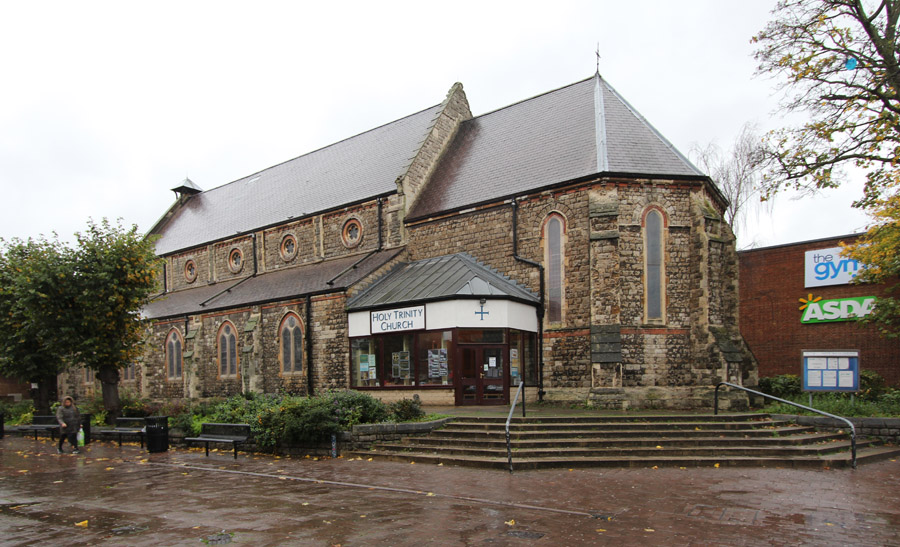
Holy Trinity, Wealdstone

The Holy Trinity Church of England was built in Gothic style in 1882.

Schools include Sacred Heart Language College, Salvatorian College and Whitefriars School.

== Transport ==
=== Tube/Trains ===
There is one station in the district:

- Harrow & Wealdstone station (Bakerloo line, Watford DC Line, Southern and West Midlands Trains)

=== Bus routes ===
Seven London Buses routes run during day, as well as a school bus (640). There are two night routes serving Wealdstone: 140 and N18.

== Notable people ==
- Gordon Hill/The Wealdstone Raider, internet personality
- Joseph McCann, lived for some time at an estate in Wealdstone
