= North Harrow (ward) =

Electoral ward in London, England

- Electoral ward for the Harrow London Borough Council
- North Harrow ward boundaries since 2022
- Borough: Harrow
- County: Greater London
- Population: 8,994 (2021) (Note: 2021 Census data reported for 2022 ward boundaries)
- Electorate: 6,996 (2022)
- Major settlements: North Harrow
- Area: 1.306 square kilometres (0.504 sq mi)

Current electoral ward
- Created: 2022
- Number of members: 2
- Councillors: Anola Savjani; Will Jackson
- GSS code: E05013554

North Harrow is an electoral ward in the London Borough of Harrow. The ward was first used in the 2022 elections and elects two councillors to Harrow London Borough Council.

== List of councillors ==
| Seat | Councillor | Took office | Left office | Party | Election |
|---|---|---|---|---|---|
| 1 | Christopher Baxter | 2022 | 2026 | Conservative | 2022 |
| 2 | Janet Mote | 2022 | 2026 | Conservative | 2022 |
| 1 | Anola Savjani | 2026 | Incumbent | Conservative | 2026 |
| 2 | Will Jackson (Note: Will Jackson was deselected by the Conservatives after "wholly unacceptable" comments but was listed as the Conservative candidate on the ballot paper as the nomination deadline had passed.) | 2026 | Incumbent | Independent | 2026 |

== Summary ==
Councillors elected by party at each general borough election.

== Harrow council elections ==
=== 2026 election ===
The election took place on 7 May 2026.

2026 Harrow London Borough Council election: North Harrow
| Party | Candidate | Votes | % | ±% |
|---|---|---|---|---|
| Conservative | Anola Savjani | 1,319 | 44 | |
| Conservative | Will Jackson | 1,230 | 40 | |
| Labour | Sechi Kailasa | 966 | 32 | |
| Labour | James Watkins | 890 | 30 | |
| Green | Simon Courtenage | 612 | 20 | |
| Reform | Lesline Lewinson | 354 | 12 | |
| Reform | Sagar Shukla | 336 | 12 | |
| Liberal Democrats | Daniel Hawkes | 310 | 10 | |
| Turnout | | 6,017 | 47% | |
| Conservative hold | | Swing | | |
| Conservative hold | | Swing | | |

=== 2022 election ===
The election took place on 5 May 2022.

2022 Harrow London Borough Council election: North Harrow
| Party | Candidate | Votes | % | ±% |
|---|---|---|---|---|
| Conservative | Christopher Baxter | 1,510 | 54.2 | N/A |
| Conservative | Janet Mote | 1,487 | 53.4 | N/A |
| Labour | Hugh Brown | 1482 | 53.2 | N/A |
| Labour | Georgia Weston | 1448 | 52.0 | N/A |
| Green | Emma Wallace | 331 | 11.9 | N/A |
| Liberal Democrats | Marshel Amutharasan | 255 | 9.2 | N/A |
| Turnout | | 2,785 | 40.0 | |
| Conservative win (new seat) | | | | |
| Conservative win (new seat) | | | | |
