= Peace & Justice Project =

British political charity

Peace & Justice Project Ltd
- Formation: 13 October 2020; 5 years ago
- Founder: Jeremy Corbyn
- Key people: Jeremy Corbyn (director); Pamela Fitzpatrick (director); Christine Blower (director; 2020–2023)
- Website: thecorbynproject.com
- Formerly called: Peace and Justice Initiative Ltd (October–November 2020)

Peace & Justice Project Ltd (PJP) is a left-wing British organisation founded on 13 October 2020 by the former leader of the Labour Party, Jeremy Corbyn. Its current directors are Corbyn and Pamela Fitzpatrick.

== Background ==
Following the Labour Party's defeat in the 2019 United Kingdom general election, Jeremy Corbyn stated his intention to stand down as leader of the Labour Party. In April 2020, Keir Starmer became the leader of the Labour Party. Starmer was seen as a more centrist figure than Corbyn.

On 29 October 2020, a report by the Equalities and Human Rights Commission into antisemitism in the Labour Party was published, finding that the party was responsible for unlawful acts of harassment and discrimination. In response to the report, Corbyn said that while antisemitism was "absolutely abhorrent" and that "one anti-Semite [in the Labour Party] is one too many", he said that "the scale of the problem was also dramatically overstated for political reasons by our opponents inside and outside the party, as well as by much of the media" leading to his suspension from the party.

== Project founding ==
On 13 December 2020, Jeremy Corbyn announced the project, and said that its areas of focus will include environmentalism, international peace cooperation, poverty, social inequality and corporate power. Corbyn launched the project on 17 January 2021, and its affiliates include Christine Blower, Len McCluskey and Zarah Sultana. Rafael Correa said that he "welcome[d] the creation" of the project.

=== Spoof site ===
On 15 December 2020, The Times of Israel reported that a satirical website claiming to be the Project for Peace and Justice had been set up "by critics of Corbyn, and they are using it to mock him for his strident criticism of Israel and alleged soft-pedaling of anti-Semitism in Labour's ranks".

== Campaigns ==
=== Music For A Ceasefire open letter ===
On 9 November 2023 the PJP released an open letter from artists, musicians and performers calling for the United Kingdom and United States governments to press for a ceasefire in the Israel-Gaza War.

=== Gaza Tribunal ===
After Corbyn's private member's bill to hold an official inquiry into the UK's role in the Israel-Gaza War was blocked by the government, the PJP held a tribunal on the subject in September 2025 at Church House, Westminster, with participants including UN Special Rapporteur on the occupied Palestinian territories Francesca Albanese.

== Conversion into a new political party ==
In January 2022, The Sunday Telegraph reported that Corbyn was urged to make the project a new political party that will position itself in elections as standing to the left of Labour. This impetus came from close political confidants, as well as his wife Laura.

In July 2025 Corbyn and Sultana issued a joint statement confirming the launch of a new left-wing party under the provisional name of Your Party and encouraging supporters to register, with a website and mailing list managed by the Peace & Justice Project.

== See also ==
- Momentum (organisation)
- List of organisations associated with the Labour Party (UK)
- Independent Alliance (UK)
