= West Harrow (ward) =

Electoral ward in London, England

- Electoral ward for the Harrow London Borough Council
- Borough: Harrow
- County: Greater London
- Population: 10,363 (2021)
- Major settlements: West Harrow
- Area: 1.285 km²

Current electoral ward
- Created: 2002
- Seats: 2 (since 2022); 3 (until 2022)

West Harrow is an electoral ward in the London Borough of Harrow. The ward was first used in the 2002 elections and elects two councillors to Harrow London Borough Council.

== Geography ==
The ward is named after the suburb of West Harrow.

== Councillors ==
Election	Councillors		
2018	Christine Robson (Labour)	Kareema Marikar (Labour)	Adam Swersky (Labour)
2022	Rekha Shah (Labour)	Asif Hussain (Labour)	Two seats

== Elections ==
=== 2022 ===
West Harrow (2)
Party	Candidate	Votes	%	±%
Labour	Rekha Shah	1,507	54.7	
Labour	Asif Hussain	1,459	52.9	
Conservative	Luke Andrew Titus Wilson	911	33.0	
Conservative	Caroline Mojisola Ojo	849	30.8	
Green	Monika Sobiecki	437	15.9	
Liberal Democrats	Em Dean	351	12.7	
Turnout		2841	40	
Labour hold		Swing		
Labour hold		Swing		

== See also ==
- List of electoral wards in Greater London
