= 2018 Harrow London Borough Council election =

2018 local election in England

2018 Harrow Borough Council election
- 3 May 2018

All 63 seats to Harrow London Borough Council 32 seats needed for a majority

	First party	Second party
Party	Labour	Conservative
Last election	34 seats, 40.0%	26 seats, 40.6%
Seats won	35	28
Seat change	▲1	▲2
Popular vote	98,148	94,902
Percentage	46.6%	45.1%
Swing	▲6.6%	▲4.5%
- Map of the results of the 2018 Harrow council election. Labour in red and Conservatives in blue.
Council control before election
Labour
Council control after election
Labour

The 2018 Harrow London Borough Council election took place on 3 May 2018 to elect members of Harrow London Borough Council in England. This was on the same day as other local elections in England. The Conservatives had hoped to win control of the council from Labour, but Labour emerged with an increased number of seats and kept their majority. The Liberal Democrats lost their only seat in the borough. The Conservatives lost seats to Labour, but maintained their total of 28 by winning two seats that had been held by independents.

== Overall result ==
Harrow Council election result 2018
Party	Seats	Gains	Losses	Net gain/loss	Seats %	Votes %	Votes	+/−
Labour	35	1	0	+1	55.6	46.6	98,148	+6.6
Conservative	28	2	0	+2	44.4	45.1	94,902	+4.5
Liberal Democrats	0	0	1	-1	0.0	6.4	13,399	+0.7
Green	0	0	0	0	0.0	1.4	2,922	+0.3
Independent	0	0	2	-2	0.0	0.4	807	-1.9
National Liberal	0	0	0	0	0.0	0.2	325	New

== Results by ward ==
=== Belmont ===
Belmont (3)
Party	Candidate	Votes	%	±%
Conservative	Mina Parmar	2,292	61.9	+15.3
Conservative	Anjana Patel	2,254	60.9	+13.1
Conservative	Lynda Seymour	2,172	58.7	+11.9
Labour	Labiba Choudhury	1,045	28.2	−8.2
Labour	Laura Stackpoole	1,033	27.9	−5.9
Labour	Mohammed Gbadamosi	758	20.5	−8.2
Liberal Democrats	Tracey Pollard	329	8.9	−3.7
Green	Soody Ahmad	311	8.4	N/A
Total votes				
Conservative hold		Swing		
Conservative hold		Swing		
Conservative hold		Swing		

=== Canons ===
Canons (3)
Party	Candidate	Votes	%	±%
Conservative	Ameet Jogia	2,403	60.7	+5.2
Conservative	Amir Moshenson	2,390	60.4	+5.9
Conservative	Bharat Thakker	2,278	57.5	+5.7
Labour	Howard Bluston	1,154	29.1	−2.9
Labour	Mrinal Choudhury	1,052	26.6	−3.6
Labour	Jill Travers	993	25.1	+1.0
Liberal Democrats	Adam Bernard	521	13.2	+0.1
Total votes				
Conservative hold		Swing		
Conservative hold		Swing		
Conservative hold		Swing		

=== Edgware ===
Edgware (3)
Party	Candidate	Votes	%	±%
Labour	Nitin Parekh	1,891	55.6	+8.9
Labour	James Lee	1,797	52.8	+7.9
Labour	Angella Murphy-Strachan	1,640	48.2	+6.5
Conservative	Govind Bharadia	1,302	38.3	+1.7
Conservative	Salim Chowdhury	1,015	29.8	−2.5
Conservative	Augustine Ebot	994	29.2	−0.5
Liberal Democrats	Timothy Collison	270	7.9	N/A
Liberal Democrats	Steven Kuo	244	7.2	N/A
Total votes				
Labour hold		Swing		
Labour hold		Swing		
Labour hold		Swing		

=== Greenhill ===
Greenhill (3)
Party	Candidate	Votes	%	±%
Labour	Sue Anderson	1,857	57.1	+7.8
Labour	Ghazanfar Ali	1,569	48.2	+8.7
Labour	Keith Ferry	1,557	47.8	+8.0
Conservative	Surendra Patel	962	29.6	+5.1
Conservative	Narinder Mudhar	961	29.5	+1.8
Conservative	Bernard Segal	910	28.0	+0.7
Green	Emma Wallace	378	11.6	N/A
Green	Madeleine Atkins	303	9.3	−2.7
Liberal Democrats	Nahid Boethe	265	8.1	+2.9
Green	Rowan Langley	251	7.7	N/A
Total votes				
Labour hold		Swing		
Labour hold		Swing		
Labour hold		Swing		

=== Harrow on the Hill ===
Harrow on the Hill (3)
Party	Candidate	Votes	%	±%
Labour	Dan Anderson	1,875	52.7	+12.3
Labour	Sarah Butterworth	1,864	52.4	+16.6
Labour	Jamie Honey	1,827	51.3	+20.8
Conservative	Eileen Kinnear	1,364	38.3	+0.5
Conservative	June Baxter	1,325	37.2	−1.4
Conservative	Barry Macleod-Cullinane	1,310	36.8	−1.8
Liberal Democrats	Karsten Shaw	302	8.5	+0.6
Liberal Democrats	Ibrahim Abdulle	242	6.8	N/A
Total votes				
Labour hold		Swing		
Labour gain from Conservative		Swing		
Labour gain from Conservative		Swing		

=== Harrow Weald ===
Harrow Weald (3)
Party	Candidate	Votes	%	±%
Conservative	Ramji Chauhan	1,772	46.8	+9.2
Conservative	Stephen Greek	1,751	46.2	+5.8
Conservative	Pritesh Patel	1,737	45.8	+6.8
Labour	Lee Johnson	1,296	34.2	+6.7
Labour	Sajid Parkar	1,159	30.6	+3.4
Labour	Manju Raghwani	1,119	29.5	+3.8
Liberal Democrats	Darren Diamond	714	18.8	−6.4
Liberal Democrats	Sanjay Karia	703	18.5	−6.2
Liberal Democrats	Paolo Arrigo	686	18.1	−6.5
Total votes				
Conservative hold		Swing		
Conservative hold		Swing		
Conservative hold		Swing		

=== Hatch End ===
Hatch End (3)
Party	Candidate	Votes	%	±%
Conservative	Susan Hall	2,236	66.7	+7.6
Conservative	John Hinkley	2,035	60.7	+10.9
Conservative	Jean Lammiman	2,017	60.2	+10.4
Labour	Stephen Hickman	978	29.2	+2.5
Labour	Bill Stephenson	807	24.1	+0.7
Labour	Adam Shabbir	803	24.0	−1.0
Liberal Democrats	John Bryant	346	10.3	+0.9
Liberal Democrats	Nana Adjepong	278	8.3	N/A
Total votes				
Conservative hold		Swing		
Conservative hold		Swing		
Conservative hold		Swing		

=== Headstone North ===
Headstone North (3)
Party	Candidate	Votes	%	±%
Conservative	Christopher Baxter	1,877	48.9	+17.9
Conservative	Janet Mote	1,824	47.5	+14.5
Conservative	Lesline Lewinson	1,741	45.3	+18.8
Labour	Will Gee	1,597	41.6	+20.6
Labour	Aghileh Djafari-Marbini	1,482	38.6	+18.9
Labour	Endri Hatillari	1,445	37.6	+20.5
Liberal Democrats	Robert D'Souza	440	11.5	+5.2
Liberal Democrats	Bansri Buddhdev	359	9.3	N/A
Total votes				
Conservative gain from Independent		Swing		
Conservative gain from Independent		Swing		
Conservative hold		Swing		

=== Headstone South ===
Headstone South (3)
Party	Candidate	Votes	%	±%
Labour	Simon Brown	2,066	61.9	+14.6
Labour	Pamela Fitzpatrick	2,002	60.0	+15.2
Labour	Sasi Suresh	1,880	56.4	+13.4
Conservative	Calum McHale	974	29.2	+1.1
Conservative	Mala Morjaria	938	28.1	+2.8
Conservative	Prakash Raja	850	25.5	−1.7
Liberal Democrats	Lisa-Maria Bornemann	414	12.4	+1.8
Liberal Democrats	Claire Ingham	328	9.8	−0.1
Total votes				
Labour hold		Swing		
Labour hold		Swing		
Labour hold		Swing		

=== Kenton East ===
Kenton East (3)
Party	Candidate	Votes	%	±%
Conservative	Nitesh Hirani	1,964	51.4	+16.8
Labour	Niraj Dattani	1,791	46.9	+2.1
Conservative	Chetna Halai	1,770	46.4	+14.7
Labour	Nish Patel	1,767	46.3	+5.3
Conservative	Manjibhai Kara	1,706	44.7	+13.6
Labour	Aneka Shah-Levy	1,614	42.3	+1.0
Total votes				
Conservative gain from Labour		Swing		
Labour hold		Swing		
Conservative gain from Labour		Swing		

=== Kenton West ===
Kenton West (3)
Party	Candidate	Votes	%	±%
Labour	Ajay Maru	1,967	49.3	+5.1
Conservative	Vina Mithani	1,967	49.3	+4.9
Conservative	Kanti Rabadia	1,918	48.1	+6.5
Conservative	Richard Bhanap	1,763	44.2	+2.9
Labour	Shahania Choudhury	1,730	43.4	+3.2
Labour	James Holah	1,662	41.7	+2.0
Liberal Democrats	Sarah Ismail	232	5.8	−0.8
Total votes				
Labour hold		Swing		
Conservative hold		Swing		
Conservative hold		Swing		

=== Marlborough ===
Marlborough (3)
Party	Candidate	Votes	%	±%
Labour	David Perry	2,059	62.1	+11.9
Labour	Varsha Parmar	2,039	61.5	+12.5
Labour	Antonio Weiss	1,917	57.9	+13.8
Conservative	William Diffey	938	28.3	+0.2
Conservative	Pravin Seedher	872	26.3	+0.8
Conservative	Sukeshi Thakkar	783	23.6	+1.1
Green	Mark Baker	517	15.6	+2.1
Total votes				
Labour hold		Swing		
Labour hold		Swing		
Labour hold		Swing		

=== Pinner ===
Pinner (3)
Party	Candidate	Votes	%	±%
Conservative	Stephen Wright	1,908	53.9	+1.1
Conservative	Norman Stevenson	1,885	53.3	+0.2
Conservative	Paul Osborn	1,770	50.0	−1.4
Labour	Jane Massey	906	25.6	+0.5
Labour	Ron Schneider	816	23.1	−0.5
Independent	Niamh McEnery	807	22.8	N/A
Labour	Sanjay Dighe	806	22.8	+2.5
Liberal Democrats	Veronica Chamberlain	476	13.5	+0.7
Liberal Democrats	David Brooks	432	12.2	N/A
Total votes				
Conservative hold		Swing		
Conservative hold		Swing		
Conservative hold		Swing		

=== Pinner South ===
Pinner South (3)
Party	Candidate	Votes	%	±%
Conservative	Richard Almond	2,156	60.4	+4.0
Conservative	Kamaljit Chana	2,024	56.7	+7.1
Conservative	Charles Mote	2,019	56.5	+4.2
Labour	Anne Whitehead	965	27.0	−4.7
Labour	Ann Groves	941	26.4	−3.7
Labour	David Nash	910	25.5	−2.9
Liberal Democrats	Bronwen Jones	542	15.2	N/A
Liberal Democrats	Robert Pitt	487	13.6	N/A
Total votes				
Conservative hold		Swing		
Conservative hold		Swing		
Conservative hold		Swing		

=== Queensbury ===
Queensbury (3)
Party	Candidate	Votes	%	±%
Labour	Sachin Shah	2,174	57.2	+13.6
Labour	Kiran Ramchandani	2,134	56.2	+14.9
Labour	Michael Borio	2,066	54.4	+10.5
Conservative	Umesh Perera	1,469	38.7	+4.0
Conservative	Tracy Pearmain	1,413	37.2	+4.6
Conservative	Zak Wagman	1,337	35.2	+5.9
Total votes				
Labour hold		Swing		
Labour hold		Swing		
Labour hold		Swing		

=== Rayners Lane ===
Rayners Lane (3)
Party	Candidate	Votes	%	±%
Labour	Krishna Suresh	1,794	42.9	+6.4
Labour	Jeff Anderson	1,623	38.9	+6.8
Labour	Chloe Smith	1,593	38.1	+8.5
Liberal Democrats	Christopher Noyce	1,537	36.8	+6.1
Conservative	Rosalyn Neale	1,207	28.9	+0.9
Liberal Democrats	Geraldine Noyce	1,172	28.1	+8.3
Conservative	Robin Paul	1,166	27.9	+1.2
Conservative	Raksha Pandya	989	23.7	+2.0
Liberal Democrats	Pietro Rescia	917	22.0	+3.1
Total votes				
Labour hold		Swing		
Labour hold		Swing		
Labour gain from Liberal Democrats		Swing		

=== Roxbourne ===
Roxbourne (3)
Party	Candidate	Votes	%	±%
Labour	Graham Henson	2,361	66.7	+17.9
Labour	Maxine Henson	2,237	63.2	+11.1
Labour	Dean Gilligan	2,205	62.3	+16.5
Conservative	Joyce Nickolay	825	23.3	−0.1
Conservative	Julia Merison	781	22.1	+2.0
Conservative	John Rennie	683	19.3	+2.0
Green	Swati Patel	391	11.0	N/A
Total votes				
Labour hold		Swing		
Labour hold		Swing		
Labour hold		Swing		

=== Roxeth ===
Roxeth (3)
Party	Candidate	Votes	%	±%
Labour	Jerry Miles	2,285	66.2	+18.3
Labour	Peymana Assad	2,041	59.2	+9.7
Labour	Primesh Patel	2,001	58.0	+15.8
Conservative	John Nickolay	964	27.9	+0.2
Conservative	Mohammad Kaiserimam	773	22.4	−0.4
Conservative	Annabel Singh	771	22.3	+1.0
National Liberal	Raj Rajalingham	325	9.4	N/A
Total votes				
Labour hold		Swing		
Labour hold		Swing		
Labour hold		Swing		

=== Stanmore Park ===
Stanmore Park (3)
Party	Candidate	Votes	%	±%
Conservative	Marilyn Ashton	2,427	67.6	+6.8
Conservative	Camilla Bath	2,395	66.8	+4.8
Conservative	Philip Benjamin	2,366	65.9	+7.6
Labour	Jeffrey Gallant	825	23.0	−0.3
Labour	James Lockie	813	22.7	+0.7
Labour	Lesley Stackpoole	745	20.8	+1.8
Green	Linda Robinson	403	11.2	+1.9
Total votes				
Conservative hold		Swing		
Conservative hold		Swing		
Conservative hold		Swing		

=== Wealdstone ===
Wealdstone (3)
Party	Candidate	Votes	%	±%
Labour	Phillip O'Dell	1,796	58.8	+12.3
Labour	Natasha Proctor	1,781	58.3	+15.9
Labour	Rekha Shah	1,672	54.7	+9.3
Conservative	Deanna Keene	872	28.5	+3.7
Conservative	Elliot Van Emden	747	24.4	+0.4
Conservative	Dimabo Wolseley	691	22.6	+0.9
Green	Alexander Lee	368	12.0	+0.4
Liberal Democrats	Stephen Carey	311	10.2	N/A
Total votes				
Labour hold		Swing		
Labour hold		Swing		
Labour hold		Swing		

=== West Harrow ===
West Harrow (3)
Party	Candidate	Votes	%	±%
Labour	Christine Robson	1,910	52.0	+9.2
Labour	Kareema Marikar	1,792	48.8	+8.0
Labour	Adam Swersky	1,764	48.0	+10.6
Conservative	Kuha Kumaran	1,456	39.6	+6.1
Conservative	John Baxter	1,411	38.4	+3.2
Conservative	Dinesh Solanki	1,282	34.9	+2.6
Liberal Democrats	Simon Courtenage	366	10.0	+2.8
Liberal Democrats	Prakash Nandhra	249	6.8	+1.7
Total votes				
Labour hold		Swing		
Labour hold		Swing		
Labour hold		Swing		

== By-elections ==
=== Pinner South ===
Pinner South: 14 October 2021
Party	Candidate	Votes	%	±%
Conservative	Hitesh Karia	1,392	60.5	+1.6
Liberal Democrats	Sanjay Karia	390	16.9	+2.2
Labour	Brahma Mohanty	331	14.4	−12.0
Green	Alexander Lee	188	8.2	N/A
Majority		1,002	43.6	
Turnout		2,309	28.8	
Conservative hold		Swing	▼0.3	
