= Gareth Thomas (English politician) =

British Labour politician (born 1967)

Gareth Thomas MP
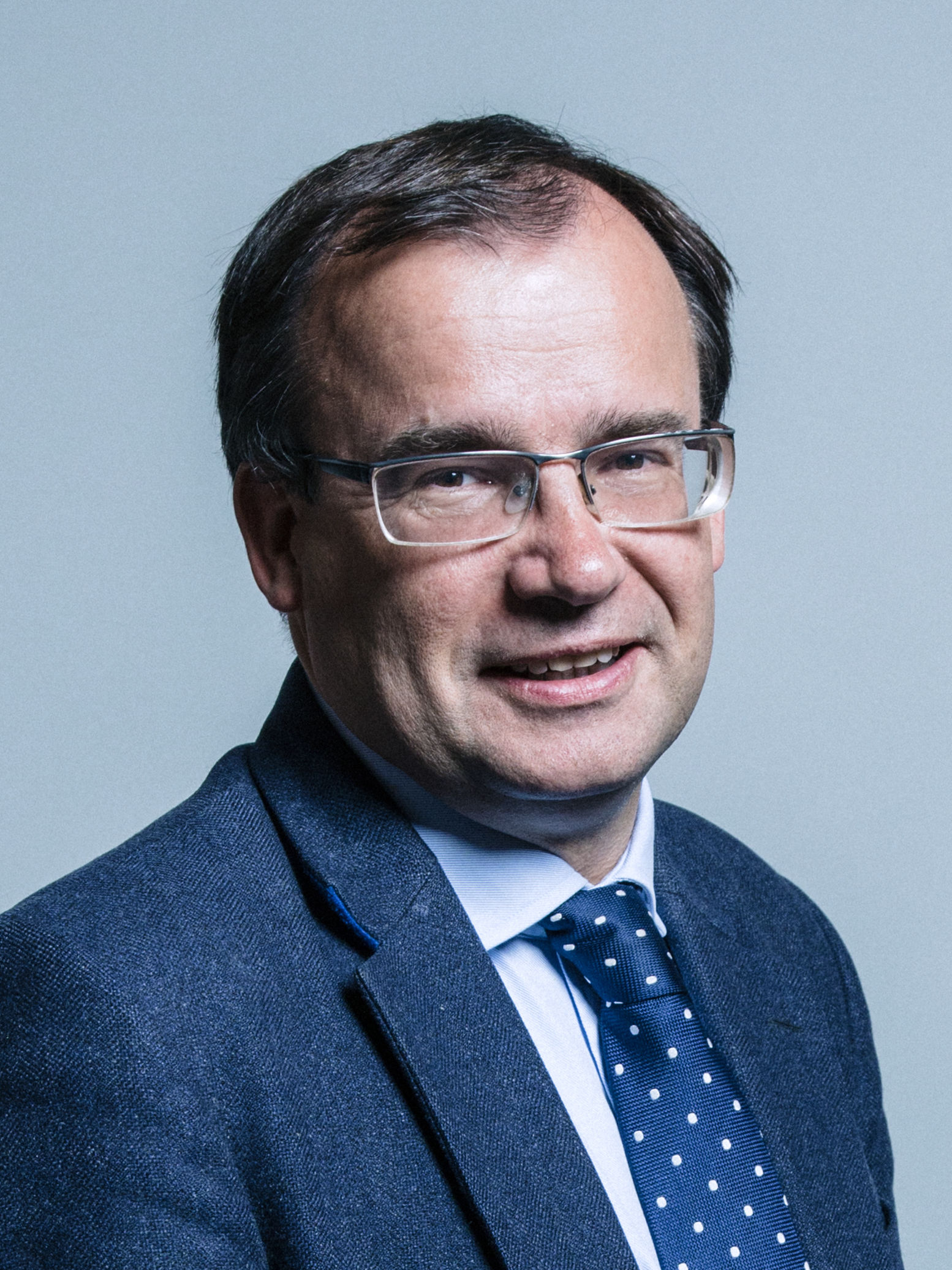
- Official portrait, 2017

Minister of State for International Development
- In office 3 October 2008 – 13 May 2010
- Prime Minister: Gordon Brown
- Preceded by: Office established
- Succeeded by: Alan Duncan

Minister of State for Trade, Investment and Consumer Affairs
- In office 3 October 2008 – 5 June 2009
- Prime Minister: Gordon Brown
- Preceded by: The Lord Jones of Birmingham
- Succeeded by: The Lord Davies of Abersoch
Junior ministerial offices
Parliamentary Under-Secretary of State
2024–2025	Services, Small Business and Exports
2007–2008	Trade and Consumer Affairs
2003–2007	International Development
Shadow portfolios
2020–2024	Trade
2016–2017	Local Government
2014–2015	Africa and the Middle East
2013–2014	Europe
2011–2013	Civil Society
2010–2011	Higher Education and Science
2010–2010	International Development

Member of Parliament for Harrow West
- Incumbent
- Assumed office 1 May 1997
- Preceded by: Robert Gurth Hughes
- Majority: 6,642 (14.6%)

Chair of the Co-operative Party
- In office 10 July 2001 – 8 June 2019
- Preceded by: Jim Lee
- Succeeded by: Anna Turley

Member of Harrow Council for Wealdstone
- In office 3 May 1990 – 17 July 1997
- Succeeded by: Cyril Harrison

Personal details
- Born: Gareth Richard Thomas; 15 July 1967 (age 59) Harrow, London, England
- Party: Labour Co-op
- Education: Hatch End High School; Lowlands College
- Alma mater: Aberystwyth University (BSc); Thames Polytechnic (PGCE); King's College London (MA)
- Website: gareththomas.org.uk

Gareth Richard Thomas (born 15 July 1967) is a British Labour and Co-operative politician who has served as the Member of Parliament (MP) for Harrow West since 1997. He served as Parliamentary Under-Secretary of State for Services, Small Business and Exports from July 2024 to September 2025. Thomas also served as Minister of State for International Development and Minister of State for Trade, Investment and Consumer Affairs between 2008 and 2010. He was the Chair of the Co-operative Party from 2001 until 2019.

== Early life and education ==
Thomas spent his childhood in the London Borough of Harrow, attending Hatch End High School and later Lowlands College. He gained a Bachelor of Science (BSc) degree in economics from Aberystwyth University, graduating in 1988. He later undertook a Postgraduate Certificate in Education (PGCE) at Thames Polytechnic (now the University of Greenwich) to become a teacher, which he completed in 1992. In 1996, he studied for a Master of Arts (MA) degree in Imperial and Commonwealth Studies at King's College London.

== Parliamentary career ==
Thomas was first elected to represent Harrow West at the 1997 general election when he defeated the incumbent Conservative, Robert Hughes, with a majority of 1,240 votes.

He was appointed Parliamentary under-secretary of state at the Department for International Development in 2003.

The same year, Thomas made an early attempt to ban smoking in restaurants via a Private Members' Bill.

Following a June 2007 reshuffle, Thomas remained at International Development whilst also being part of the new Department for Business, Enterprise and Regulatory Reform, being appointed as Parliamentary Under-Secretary of State for Trade Policy and Consumer Affairs. He had the responsibility of co-ordinating trade policy between the two departments.

Following Gordon Brown's reshuffle of 3 October 2008, Thomas was promoted to Minister of State in both departments, taking on the portfolio of Trade, Investment and Consumer Affairs. In the June 2009 reshuffle DBERR was abolished, leaving Thomas to continue his role solely at International Development, with responsibility for consumer affairs passing to Kevin Brennan.

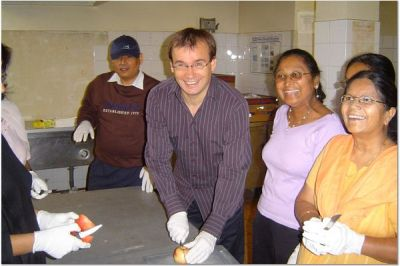
Thomas helping to cut fruit for donation to a local hospital in 2008.

In May 2010 he was re-elected as Member of Parliament for Harrow West with a reduced majority (based on a notional 2005 result). He was Shadow Minister for Higher Education and Science from October 2010 to October 2011, Shadow Minister for Civil Society from October 2011 to October 2013, Shadow Minister for Europe from March 2013 to October 2014, then Shadow Minister for Africa and the Middle East from October 2014 to March 2015.

At the 2015 general election the Conservative Party candidate Hannah David produced a significant swing from Labour to the Conservatives, reducing his majority to 2,208. Thomas received his worst general election result to date at the 2015 election.

In the 2016 European Union referendum, Thomas campaigned for the UK to remain a member of the European Union (EU) and has consistently supported the United Kingdom's membership of the EU.

Thomas supported Owen Smith in the 2016 Labour leadership election. Following Jeremy Corbyn's re-election as Labour leader, Thomas was one of the first Labour MPs to return to the frontbench, as Shadow Minister for Local Government until June 2017.

In 2017, he voted against the bill permitting the government to start negotiations on withdrawal from the EU by sending an article 50 notice to the EU; in doing so he broke the party whip.

In the 2017 and 2019 general elections, Thomas was re-elected as the Member of Parliament for Harrow West with majorities of 13,314 and 8,692 respectively.

Thomas organised Harrow's first university fair at Whitmore High School in 2016, allowing students to engage with leading universities within the UK and abroad. The event has been held annually since, and due to its success an additional careers fair was arranged for late 2020.

In 2020, Thomas said the next Labour leader "should confirm they will not support nationalising the water and energy industries", claiming that voters were put off voting Labour because they did not believe these pledges were deliverable alongside calls for nationalisation of the railways and Royal Mail, which Thomas supports.

Thomas supported Emily Thornberry in the 2020 Labour leadership contest.

He served on the Official Opposition frontbench as Shadow Minister for International Trade from April 2020 to May 2024.

Thomas is a member of Labour Friends of Palestine and the Middle East and a founder member of Labour Friends of India.

=== 2024 General Election ===
Thomas retained his seat with a majority of 6,642 in the 2024 General Election, whereupon he was appointed Parliamentary Under-Secretary of State for Services, Small Business and Exports.

== 2016 London mayoral bid ==
In 2015, Thomas sought to become the Labour Party's candidate in the 2016 election for Mayor of London, receiving sufficient nominations to make it to the final six nominees for the party's mayoral candidate. He finished in last place on the party's final ballot with 1.2% of the vote, with Sadiq Khan becoming Labour's mayoral candidate.

Parliament of the United Kingdom
Preceded by Robert Hughes	Member of Parliament for Harrow West; 1997–present	Incumbent
Political offices
Preceded by Lord Jones (Resigned from post)	Minister of State at the Department for International Development; 2008–2010	Succeeded by Alan Duncan
Party political offices
Preceded by Jim Lee	Chair of the Co-operative Party; 2001–2019	Succeeded by Anna Turley
