= Wealdstone South =

Electoral ward in London, England

- Electoral ward for the Harrow London Borough Council
- Borough: Harrow
- County: Greater London
- Population: 7,957 (2021)
- Major settlements: Wealdstone
- Area: 0.8094 km²

Current electoral ward
- Created: 2022
- Seats: 2
- Created from: Wealdstone

Wealdstone South is an electoral ward in the London Borough of Harrow. The ward was first used in the 2022 elections and elects two councillors to Harrow London Borough Council.

== Geography ==
The ward is named after the suburb of Wealdstone.

== Councillors ==
Election	Councillors	
2022	Kandy Dolor (Labour)	Dean Gilligan (Labour)

== Elections ==
=== 2022 ===
Wealdstone South (2)
Party	Candidate	Votes	%	±%
Labour	Kandy Ann Marie Dolor	888	54.8	
Labour	Dean Gilligan	847	52.3	
Conservative	Manjibhai Kara	661	40.8	
Conservative	Naresh Gothadiya	635	39.2	
Green	Halema Khatun	208	12.8	
Turnout		1680	33	
Labour win (new seat)				
Labour win (new seat)				

== See also ==
- List of electoral wards in Greater London
