= Wealdstone North =

Electoral ward in London, England

- Electoral ward for the Harrow London Borough Council
- Borough: Harrow
- County: Greater London
- Population: 10,488 (2021)
- Major settlements: Wealdstone
- Area: 0.9835 km²

Current electoral ward
- Created: 2022
- Seats: 2
- Created from: Wealdstone

Wealdstone North is an electoral ward in the London Borough of Harrow. The ward was first used in the 2022 elections and elects two councillors to Harrow London Borough Council.

== Geography ==
The ward is named after the suburb of Wealdstone.

== Councillors ==
Election	Councillors	
2022	Shahania Choudhury (Labour)	Phillip O'Dell (Labour) (Independent since 2023)

== Elections ==
=== 2022 ===
Wealdstone North (2)
Party	Candidate	Votes	%	±%
Labour	Shahania Choudhury	1,405	65.2	
Labour	Phillip William O'Dell	1,361	63.1	
Conservative	Vinod Tikoo	781	36.2	
Conservative	Paul Francis Greek	766	35.5	
Turnout		2266	33	
Labour win (new seat)				
Labour win (new seat)				

== See also ==
- List of electoral wards in Greater London
