= Grade II listed buildings in London =

London is divided into 32 boroughs and the City of London. As there are 16,197 Grade II listed buildings in London they have been split into separate lists for each borough.

The City of London and the 32 London boroughs
1. City of London; 2. City of Westminster; 3. Kensington and Chelsea; 4. Hammersmith and Fulham; 5. Wandsworth; 6. Lambeth; 7. Southwark; 8. Tower Hamlets; 9. Hackney; 10. Islington; 11. Camden; 12. Brent; 13. Ealing; 14. Hounslow; 15. Richmond; 16. Kingston; 17. Merton	18. Sutton; 19. Croydon; 20. Bromley; 21. Lewisham; 22. Greenwich; 23. Bexley; 24. Havering; 25. Barking and Dagenham; 26. Redbridge; 27. Newham; 28. Waltham Forest; 29. Haringey; 30. Enfield; 31. Barnet; 32. Harrow; 33. Hillingdon

== City of London ==
- Grade II listed buildings in the City of London (EC1)
- Grade II listed buildings in the City of London (EC2)
- Grade II listed buildings in the City of London (EC3)
- Grade II listed buildings in the City of London (EC4)
- Grade II listed buildings in the City of London (WC and E)

== See also ==
- Grade I listed buildings in London
- Grade II* listed buildings in London
- Category:Grade II listed buildings in London
