= Grade II listed buildings in the London Borough of Harrow =

This page is a list of classified buildings Grade IIs in the London Borough of Harrow.

Name	Location	Type	Completed (Note: The date given is the date used by Historic England as significant for the initial building or that of an important part in the structure's description.)	Date designated	Grid ref. (Note: Sometimes known as OSGB36, the grid reference is based on the British national grid reference system used by the Ordnance Survey.) Geo-coordinates	Entry number (Note: The "List Entry Number" is a unique number assigned to each listed building and scheduled monument by Historic England.)	Image
Garden Cottage	Wood Lane 1. 5016 Stanmore Garden Cottage	Building	Circa 1840	31 March 1976	TQ 16738 93453	1079627	Upload Photo
Harrow & Wealdstone station	Highgrove House, High Road	Tube station	20 July 1837	6 September 1989	TQ1547689485; 51°35′33″N 0°20′08″W	1253982	Harrow & Wealdstone station More images
Hatch End railway station	Hatch End	Railway station	1842 or c. 1844	16 February 1982	TQ1305691322; 51°36′34″N 0°22′05″W	1285713	Hatch End railway station More images
Rayners Lane tube station	Rayners Lane	Tube station	1 January 1905	17 May 1994	TQ1298287506; 51°34′31″N 0°22′17″W	1261430	Rayners Lane tube station More images
Pinnerwood House	Pinnerwood House, Woodhall Road	Cottage	16th century	25 May 1983	TQ1169991716	1079628	Pinnerwood House More images
Rayners, Rayners Lane	54 Windsor Street, Uxbridge, London	Pub		6 September 1974	TQ0549084102; 51°32′45″N 0°28′48″W	1358443	Rayners, Rayners Lane More images
Springbok House	Wood Lane, Stanmore, HA7 4LQ	Building	19th century	31 March 1976	TQ1660693330	1079625	Upload Photo
The Castle, Harrow	West Street, Harrow-on-the-Hill, London	Pub	1901	8 March 1999	TQ1514287218; 51°34′19″N 0°20′24″W	1356867	The Castle, Harrow More images

== See also ==
- Grade I and II* listed buildings in the London Borough of Harrow
