= Widmore =

Widmore can refer to:

- Widmore, London, a neighborhood in Bromley
- Widmore family from Lost (TV series):
  - Charles Widmore, industrialist and father of Penny Widmore
  - Penny Widmore, love interest of Desmond Hume and daughter of Charles Widmore
