= Grade II listed buildings in the City of London (EC3) =

The City of London is a major business and financial centre in London, England. It contains over 600 listed buildings that are recorded in the National Heritage List for England. Of these, over 400 are assessed to be at Grade II, the lowest grade. This list contains the Grade II listed buildings in the EC3 postal district of the city.

== Buildings ==
Name and location	Photograph	Date	Notes
4, Brabant Court; 51.51116°N 0.08439°W		Early 18th century	Four storey Georgian house of red brick, and a doorcase with Doric pilasters under a segmented pediment. Inside, an original staircase and panneling remains.
24-28, Lombard Street; 51.51221°N 0.08674°W		1910	A large building of Portland stone and grey granite construction of four storeys, with an Oriel window and domed at the Clements Lane corner, and a group of life-sized bronze figures sat on a large segmental pediment over the main entrance.
3 Bollards; 51.50952°N 0.08430°W		Undated	A group of three octagonal cast iron bollards, with two situated at the north end of Lovat Lane, and one at the south.
9, Idol Lane; 51.50976°N 0.08298°W		Late 18th to early 19th century	Although the house is of late 18th to early 19th century, the interior has earlier fittings that are either in-situ or been reused. The building is set on a corner plot and consists of four storeys of yellow brick and a painted arcade at ground storey level.
Sir John Cass College; 51.51298°N 0.07634°W		1899	The building was originally built for Sir John Cass and remains in use as an educational institution today in the form of the David Game College. It is constructed in a modified late 17th century style, of red brick and Portland stone, with a basement of glazed brown brick. The entrance is underneath an enriched arch with steps leading up; a small polygonal tower sits on the roof to the left of the entrance, with a small lantern and lead covered dome on top. The elevation to India Street has an additional storey added, and the rear is of gault and engineering bricks with slight dressings. A large addition exists to the north.
81 and 82, Gracechurch Street; 51.51248°N 0.08442°W		Mid to late 19th century	A classical building of Portland stone, consisting of four storeys with a parapet across the roof. The ground storey has a pair of shopfronts with a passageway cut in between them.
27, Great Tower Street; 51.50958°N 0.08088°W		1914	A three-storey building in red brick with raked joints and Portland stone dressings. The ground storey has a pedimented central doorway, and passgeway on the left hand side. The building now serves as The Hung Drawn and Quartered public house.
43 and 44, Crutched Friars; 51.51132°N 0.07844°W		Mid-19th century	Mid-19th century warehouse, 3 storeys high, of pink stock brick with yellow brick dressings. A set of three segmental-headed arches are situated on the ground floor, with the central one being a window, and the two ends being entrances. A plain brick parapet stretches across the top of the front elevation.
23 and 25, Eastcheap; 51.51083°N 0.08411°W		1861–62	Designed by John Youn & Son, the corner building consists of five storeys of a polychrome brick construction with painted dressings, and a stuccoed facing to the arcaded ground storey. The exterior corner is canted.
43, Eastcheap; 51.51071°N 0.08298°W		Early 18th century	The building was originally a single building with number 45 and has since been united again. It is of three storeys with a stuccoed exterior, and a timber shopfront to the ground floor.
72-75, Fenchurch Street, 1, Lloyd's Avenue; 51.51255°N 0.07823°W		1900	A large corner building constructed from Portland stone in a classical style. The office building has four storeys, plus a further three attic storeys under a slated roof. There is a pair of tripartite arched doorways to the Fenchurch Street elevation, along with a further two to the Lloyd's Avenue elevation. A pedimented south pavilion is present on Lloyd's Avenue with a plain return of gault brick, and the rear elevation to Northumberland Avenue is irregular and mostly of yellow brick.
1-3, Finch Lane; 51.51362°N 0.08589°W		Late 19th century	The building is constructed from red brick with stone bands and dressings, and a ground floor entirely of stone. The building is three and four storeys tall, and is currently occupied by China Taiping Insurance Holdings.
39, Cornhill; 51.51320°N 0.08586°W		Mid to late 19th century	Built in a rich classical style, the three storeys are constructed from Portland stone with polished pink and grey granite. The front elevation has a series of Doric columns mounted on high bases in front of an arcaded ground storey with pediments topping the columns at either end. The top storey has a part-balustraded parapet broke by stone dormers. The block to the right, formerly known as number 42, is a five-storey narrower building of painted stone and polished pink granite, with a return elevation to St Michael's Alley.
54 and 55, Cornhill; 51.51333°N 0.08474°W		1893	The four storey building is of a terracotta construction with a modern shopfront to the ground floor. On the left hand side of the building is a two-storey octagonal tower with strapwork frieze, cornice, and cupola. On the apex of the right hand gable is a figure of a crouching devil.
65, Cornhill; 51.51363°N 0.08459°W		c1870	Designed by Edward I'Anson for Smith, Elder & Co., a five-storey narrow building of Italian Gothic style. Constructed from pale pink bricks with bands of terracotta ornament, the original ground storey has been replaced by a modern front, and the building is now occupied by Shanghai Commercial Bank.
41, Crutched Friars; 51.51131°N 0.07878°W		Late 19th century	Currently serving as The Crutched Friar public house, the building is of three storeys and is in the Queen Anne revival style. The ground storey is of rusticated stucco, with a narrow round-headed door and carriageway that is shard with number 40. Whilst the upper storeys are of red brick, with a moulded brick cornice topped with a plain parapet.
7, Botolph Alley; 51.51022°N 0.08417°W	—	Late 17th to early 18th century	The ground floor to the four storey building has been altered with a shopfront, and the upper floors are of painted brick. The third storey is a later addition with a plain brick parapet above.
George and Vulture Restaurant; 51.51291°N 0.08593°W		Early 18th century	Formerly two separate buildings, the public house is of early 18th century origin but has been re-fronted with stucco in the 19th century. The building has four storeys, with the ground floor projecting forward, and a glazed penthouse roof. A round-arched entrance is located centrally in the front face with a fanlight extending out from above, and the building has a narrow stuccoed elevation to George Yard with a passage through to Bengal Court. Inside, a series of 19th century cast iron columns support the first floor, and the oak panneling and seats are extant, along with a white-veined brown marble fire surround, and dogleg staircase. Number 3 to the right of the main pub is now integrated into the premises and is of 19th century origin, with two storeys of stucco. The ground floor has a 19th-century shopfront to the ground floor.
Pump at Junction with Leadenhall Street and Fenchurch Street; 51.51316°N 0.07793°W		18th century	18th century water pump consisting of a tapered and rusticated Portland stone pier with a shaped base and gabled 19th century coping. The spout is of brass and in the shape of an animal's head.
Iron Gateway to Yard of Church of St Botolph; 51.51384°N 0.076267°W		Early 19th century	A pair of wrought iron gates with open work piers mounted on Portland stone bases, leading into the churchyard of St Botolph's Aldgate.
48 and 49, Aldgate High Street; 51.51417°N 0.07423°W		Mid-18th century	Four storey building underneath a hipped, tile mansard roof, constructed from yellow brick with red brick dressings. A shopfront occupies the whole of the ground storey.
Iron Railings and Gates at Trinity House; 51.51024°N 0.07726°W		Late 18th century	The late 18th century railings were repaired and extended to the east after the Second World War. Composed of iron railings with gilded spearhead and urn finials atop, with laced and gilded lamp columns situated at intervals. Along with the gates, they surround the south side of Trinity House.
2-16, Creechurch Lane; 51.51351°N 0.07914°W		c1885	A former tea warehouse of iron framing with a front face of brick and stucco. It consists of five storeys, with a number of modern shopfronts separated by glazed tile columns. A round-arched passageway through the building is located on the right hand side.
2, White Lion Court; 51.51387°N 0.08458°W		1767	A large house of four storeys with the front elevation consisting of 19th century stucco, and a rusticated ground floor. A cornice hood is situated above the central doorway, mounted on decorated brackets. There are cast iron railings to the front area, and a pair of white marble lions either side of a set of steps leading to the front entrance. Inside, the original archways in the hall and first floor landing, alongside other fittings are extant.
Gateway to Yard of Church of St Peter; 51.51306°N 0.08473°W		18th century	The gateway leads to the churchyard of St Peter upon Cornhill, and includes a pair of decorative wrought iron gates incorporating the figure and emblem of St Peter, side panels, and a wide lamp arch above.
Corn Exchange Chambers; 51.51022°N 0.07948°W	—	1859	Edward I'Anson designed the building in a modified Italianate style, with four storeys of red brick and Portland stone. The ground floor is arcaded, and the end faces have partly exposed and refaced.
Front Block of Fenchurch Street Station; 51.51164°N 0.07906°W		1853	The two storey front block of Fenchurch Street railway station has a facade of gault brick and Portland stone, with a series of segmented arched openings to the ground floor, and tall round-arched windows to the second floor. A large sedimented pediment sits on top with a clock located centrally. A gabled timber canopy, supported by cast iron brackets, stretched the length of the building over the ground floor openings.
Iron Gateway Attached to Fenchurch House; 51.51132°N 0.08504°W		18th century	A pair of 18th century decorated round gates with side panels and a curved railing attached. A triple overthrow sits over the gates, with a lamp in the centre.
16, St Mary at Hill; 51.50958°N 0.08389°W	—	Early 19th century	Now in use as part of the hall of the Company of Watermen and Lightermen, and conjoined with numbers 17–19. It is of three storeys of yellow brick, with a tiled mansard roof. The shopfront has been replaced by a stuccoed ground storey that is shared with number 17.
Jamaica Wine House (Jamaica Buildings); 51.51302°N 0.08564°W		Late 19th century	A late 19th century three storey pub of red brick and red stone, with a single storey extension to the south elevation. Access to the two upper storeys are via a separate entrance at the north bay, and a similar-styled link block joins the building to the adjacent St Michael, Cornhill.
20 and 21, Billiter Street; 51.51269°N 0.08019°W		1865	Originally home to the London Shipping Exchange, the building is constructed from Portland stone in a modified classical style. It consists of four storeys, plus a part-slated mansard and basement.
Simpson's Tavern; 51.51304°N 0.08597°W		Late 17th to early 18th century	A pair of private houses was later converted into a public house. The four storeys are constructed from red brick, with a rear elevation of painted brick, and a late 19th century shop front to the ground floor. A passage dissects the ground floor leading to Ball Court.
33-35, Cornhill; 51.51321°N 0.08638°W		1857	The building is of four storeys in the classical style, and is situated on a corner plot, with the rear wing facing onto Birchin Lane being of plain brick and stone. A two-storey mansard is topped by a metal roof, and a pair of arched entrances flank the front elevation.
The Ship Public House; 51.51087°N 0.07995°W		1887	Narrow, four storey public house, with the top most storey set back. The ground floor of the front elevation consists of a painted front with a pair of arched doorways either side of a central window.
The Ship Tavern; 51.51201°N 0.08347°W		Mid-19th century	Former public house that was converted into a Nando's restaurant in 2010. It is constructed of gault brick with painted dressings. A pilastered ground storey includes wooden framed windows and doors, with decorated glass. The three storeys are topped by a slate mansard.
Royal Bank of Scotland; 51.51251°N 0.08649°W		Early 20th century	Mixed three and four storey building with a double slated mansard, formerly in use by the Royal Bank of Scotland, now serves as the London Branch of Mitsubishi UFJ Trust and Banking Corporation. The corner building is of polished pink and grey granite, with an upper of Portland stone. On order of engaged Doric columns adorn the ground floor, with Ionic columns to the first floor and a plain top storey.
Lambe's Chapel Crypt Under Yard Formerly Belonging to Church of All Hallows Staining; 51.51156°N 0.08045°W	—	Mid-12th century	Mid-12th century crypt removed from the site of Lambe's Chapel in Monkswell Street in 1872 and re-built to a reduced size in its current place by the Worshipful Company of Clothworkers.
2 and 3, Philpot Lane; 51.51139°N 0.08442°W		Early 18th century	Situated in the rear courtyard of 1, Philpot Lane. Consists of a narrow, stuccoed front of five storeys, a west elevation also of stucco, and a north elevation of red brick with moulded dressings. A corniced, stone doorway leads from the courtyard.
Drinking Fountain (South); 51.51347°N 0.08645°W		1911	Presented by the Metropolitan Drinking Fountain and Cattle Trough Association to commemorate that organisation's jubilee. The fountain consists of four semi-circular basins under a canopy supported by four Ionic columns, and is constructed from polished pink granite and bronze.
Statue of George Peabody; 51.51391°N 0.08659°W		1869	Statue of George Peabody sculptured by William Wetmore Story. Consist of a large, seated bronze figure atop a polished, pink and grey granite pedestal.
Police Public Callbox Outside St Botolph Aldgate Church; 51.51385°N 0.07642°W		c1935	Constructed from cast iron, the rectangular police public call box has a segmented arched head with a narrow projecting hood. A globular light sits on top encased in a small, flat-topped cupola on a stepped base. The front face of the box consists of a set of instructions set behind a door with a replaced glass face, with an opening name plate and embossed coat of arms above. There are 2 further flush doors beneath.
37-39, Lime Street; 51.51234°N 0.08225°W		1929	Early 20th century office building designed by Leo Sylvester Sullivan, constructed from a steel frame faced in Portland stone. The building is of a stripped classical style with neo-classical details by Henry Poole; with a central pedimented doorway situated on the ground floor, and square-headed windows divided by Tuscan piers and moulded full-height architraves continuing either side. The upper five stories have vertical strips of recessed windows, set between giant orders of piers that continue to the parapet.
147 and 148, Leadenhall Street; 51.51368°N 0.08320°W		1927	Former banking hall of Grace National Bank, of a four-storey Portland stone construction, with a further mezannine floor, attic, and basement. The main entrance is situated centrally in the front face with the arch extending into the mezannine floor, with a further entrance entering into office space located to the left-hand side. The interior lobby has Adam style detailing, and leads into a large banking hall. This has a deeply coffered ceiling, and a concrete dog-leg stair clad with marble leading to the upper floors, containing a range of walnut and oak panelled offices and boadroom.
Former Scottish Widows' Office; 51.51316°N 0.08684°W		1935	Originally built by William Curtis Green for the Scottish Widows Fund, the ground floor of the building is now in use as a Pitcher & Piano restaurant. It is of a steel frame construction with Portland stone facings to the Cornhill elevation, and glazed brick to the rear elevation onto Change Alley. Laid out in a Trapezoid shape, the building steps down from nine stories at the front, to five at the rear, and a passage into Change Alley dissects the ground floor on the right hand side. The ground floor is rusticated with an imposing central entrance of double bronze-panelled doors under a top-light covered with a jazz-deco style iron grill. A further round-arched and keystoned entrance is located to the far-right, and leads to the upper floors. Inside, the ground floor is dominated by a double-height general office hall, with offices to the south-east corner; whilst the first floor contains flush English brown oak panelled board and meeting rooms.
Ibex House; 51.51193°N 0.07522°W		1937	Designed by Fuller, Hall and Foulsham in the Streamline Moderne style, laid out as eleven stories in an elongaged H-plan, and constructed from a red frame with black and buff coloured faience. Continuous horizontal window bands with metal glazing boards, adorn the block. The Peacock public house was formerly situated on the ground floor, however closed in 2018.
7 and 9, Gracechurch Street; 51.51273°N 0.08501°W		1919	Now serving as the Crosse Keys public house, the former Hongkong and Shanghai Banking Corporation building was built by Trollope & Colls of a steel fram construction faced with Portland stone. The building is of a rhomboid shape, however has been built to appear rectangular, and consists of four main storeys. The tall ground floor has three round-arched entrance placed, with the far-right one acting as an entrance to Bell Yard behind. The plain band at first floor level supports a set of Ionic pilasters that rise through three floors to support an entablature. The interior includes a large banking hall that fills the entire first floor, with an original mosaic floor outstanding beneath a modern false floor. The upper floors contain Australian silkwood and Italian walnut panelled offices.
Rectory; 51.50993°N 0.08370°W		1834	Incorporating a late-17th century vestry, the four-storey yellow brick building serves as the rectory for the St Mary-at-Hill parish church. A pedimented 17th century doorway of painted stone leads to a vaulted passage through the building. A two-storey vestry lies in between the church building and the passage, with a modern garage in the ground floor.
38, Lombard Street; 51.51196°N 0.08593°W		Mid to late 19th century	A four-storey and two storey mansard, classical style office building of Portland stone construction. The ground floor is arcaded with polished pink granite pilasters, whilst the first floor has pilastered and corniced windows.
1-6, Lombard Street; 51.51290°N 0.08901°W		1908 and 1915	Designed by William Curtis Green for Scottish Provident, the front elevation consists of a symmetrical stone façade, which is convex curved in order to follow the line of Lombard Street. There are five main storeys, with an additional two dormered roof storeys on top. Pavilions at either end of the front elevation are slightly projecting, and the lower two storeys are embraced by a series of tall channelled arches. A giant Corinthian order unites the second, third, and fourth floors, with attached unfluted columns rising to a carved entablature. The main entrance consists of a central tripartite feature of a tall arched opening, flanked by a pair of narrower, single-storey arched openings. To the left hand side of the main structure, is a lower, four storeyed corner block, with a further entrance set in a rounded corner.
Gateway in Yard of Church of St Katherine Cree; 51.51358°N 0.07859°W	—	1631	Situated in the churchyard of St Katharine Cree, the former gateway was blocked and converted into a fountain in 1965. It is constructed of Portland stone in a coarse classical style. A carved pediment is supported by Ionic half pilasters, and a large inscribed tablet is set over the opening.
Walls, Gates and Railings to Churchyard of Church of St Dunstan in the East; 51.50952°N 0.08274°W		Late 17th century	This listing includes the walls, gate and railings surrounding the churchyard of the ruined St Dunstan-in-the-East church, built from the late 17th century onwards. A late 17th century brick retaining wall is situated to the south of the church. Modern stone coping topped with spearhead iron railings surround the churchyard, alongside early 19th century cast iron gates.
Railing and Dwarf Wall to Church of All Hallows (Flanking Great Tower Street); 51.50917°N 0.07918°W		18th century	Located at the church of All Hallows-by-the-Tower, flanking Great Tower Street. A rendered wall topped with heavy Portland stone coping and railings with urn finials.
22, Finch Lane; 51.51366°N 0.08614°W	—	1855	Four storey office building of painted stone and red brick, with the ground and first floors linked by thin stone piers rising to form tall openings. The upper storeys contain architraved windows topped by a simple crowning cornice. The return elevation, facing onto Royal Exchange Avenue, is of a similar nature to the front.
2A, Eastcheap; 51.51060°N 0.08559°W		1910–11	Located on the site of St Leonard, Eastcheap which was destroyed in the Great Fire of London, the stone faced office building is of five storeys, with shopfronts to the ground floor. The splayed corner contains an door with crouching Atlantes on Ionic pilasters supporting a semi-circular pediment, and an octagonal bay on the upper floors. The first and second storeys have shallow bow windows, whilst the third storey mullioned and transomed windows.
Pump on Pavement South of Royal Exchange; 51.51340°N 0.08670°W		1799	Cast iron obelisk with canted corners, slight decoration and long inscriptions. A granite trough of a later date previously lay at the base, however has since been removed.
66 and 67, Cornhill; 51.51357°N 0.08476°W		1880	A modified Italian renaissance style office building of Portland stone construction. Originally of four storeys, a mansard and attic have been added above. An order to paired columns adorn each storey, separated by enriched friezes at the first and second storey level, whilst a corbelled cornice crowns the top. The ground storey contains a shopfront and a passageway through the western portion leading to Sun Court.
1, Cornhill; 51.51322°N 0.08848°W		1905	Designed by John Macvicar Anderson as the head office of Liverpool & London & Globe Insurance, and includes 82, Lombard Street. Built from Portland stone in the classical style, it consists of five storeys plus a slated mansard. The first two storeys are rusticated, the third and fourth are adorned with an order of engaged Ionic columns and pilasters, whilst the top storey is crowned with a balustrade and urns. The rounded corner facing Bank Junction is capped with a dome.
6 and 7, St Mary at Hill; 51.51005°N 0.08367°W		1873	The building is constructed from yellow and red brick, Portland stone, and grey granite, in a simplified gothic style. Consisting of four storeys, the ground floor includes a passageway leadin to the entrance of the parish church of St Mary-at-Hill. The rear elevation is of plain yellow brick, and the interior includes a staircase and panelled boadroom.
Iron Gates and Railings to Entrance of Church of St Andrew Undershaft; 51.51365°N 0.08134°W		18th century	A set of 18th century wrought iron gates and railings either side, situated at the entrance to St Andrew Undershaft.
No. 38, St Mary Axe; 51.51497°N 0.08022°W		1922	Stone-faced office building designed by Sir Edwin Cooper, consisting of a channelled ground floor, and a further three storeys with a slightly recessed five-bay centre to St Mary Axe. A recessed attic storey under a pitched pantile roof tops the building.
Drinking Fountain (North); 51.51390°N 0.08638°W		1878	Polished pink and grey grainte drinking fountain by James Edmeston, topped with a bronze sculpture by Jules Dalou.
Billingsgate Market; 51.50892°N 0.08405°W		1872–73	The former market turned events venue, was designed by Sir Horace Jones and is built from brick with Portland stone dressings. The road-facing elevation has ends and centre raised above the remainder, with a pedimented centrepiece, and a round-headed arcaded extended to the raised ends; whilst the river-facing elevation is similar in style less the centrepiece, and a curved mansard lead roof with decorative stone dormers. Inside, the cast-iron roofed market structure is extant.
Premises of Messrs Turnbull and Company; 51.51291°N 0.08604°W		Late 18th to early 19th century	Row of three storey, yellow brick properties. Ground floor contains a mid-19th century wooden shop front.
2-4, Birchin Lane; 51.51305°N 0.08640°W		1910	Built for the Edinburgh Life Assurance Company, the four storey, stone-faced office building is built in the Classical style. The ground floor has plain rectangular window openings, and the first floor has central and outer windows with prominent pedimented hoods support by brackets.
23-27, Cornhill; 51.51312°N 0.08713°W		1929	Built to a design by Maurice Webb in a free Classical style, the five storey, stone-faced office building was built as the head office for Commercial Union. The ground floor is channelled with a high centrally placed door that is covered by a segmental pediment. To the left and right of the door are a pair of windows surmounted by flat cornices, the first to fourth floors have plain rectangular windows with bronze aprons, separated by fluted pilasters standing on vase bases. A plain frieze tops the fourth floor level, along with a triangular pediment and a sculptured figure.
48, Cornhill; 51.51329°N 0.08526°W		Late 18th century	Narrow red brick building of five storeys and an attic, which includes a 19th-century shop front to the ground floor. The upper floors have three recessed sash windows per storey, and a plain coped parapet lies in front of a slated mansard roof.
Australia and New Zealand Banking Group; 51.51354°N 0.08530°W	—	1896	The three storey building consists of a polished grey granite ground floor, and upper storeys of Portland stone, and was originally built for the Australia and New Zealand Banking Group. An order of Ionic pilasters line the ground floor alongside a corniced doorway in located centrally; an order of Corinthian pilasters line the first floor, whilst the second floor has a set of carved terminal figures. A high, curved roof covered with copper, is set back from the front of the building.
Statue of Duke of Wellington; 51.51347°N 0.08844°W		1844	Bronze statue of Arthur Wellesley, 1st Duke of Wellington set on a bae of grey granite, which also serves as a ventilation shaft for Bank and Monument stations. A set of curved cast iron railings surround the state, and enclose a set of rooflights to the public toilets below.
Railing and Dwarf Wall to Church of All Hallows (Flanking Byward Street); 51.50949°N 0.07927°W		18th century	Boundary wall of All Hallows-by-the-Tower to the Byward Street elevation. Of 18th century origin, the wall is rendered and topped with Portland stone coping and railings.
4 and 5, Lovat Lane; 51.51022°N 0.08400°W		Early 19th century	A stuccoed building of three storeys, each three bays wide. The ground floor has a centrally placed wooden door flanked by a pair of simple wooden pilasters.
Archway Between Numbers 39 and 40 Mitre Street and at Rear of Numbers 72 and 73 Leadenhall Street; 51.51339°N 0.07784°W	—	Medieval	A medieval pointed stone archway, blocked up with brick and embedded in the party wall behind 39 and 40 Mitre Street. Probably part of the southern wall of the Holy Trinity Priory church's chancel.
Lloyd's Building; 51.51303°N 0.08223°W		1928–30	Built as the head office for Lloyd's of London to a design by Sir Edwin Cooper. Constructed from Portland stone, the eastern part has a large ornamental doorway set into a niche topped by a coffered semi-dome. Two windows flank either side of the niche, and a row of five windows line the storey above. The main part of the building is of five storeys, with an entrance set in a canted corner, and a three-storey stepped attic on top.
139-144, Leadenhall Street; 51.51377°N 0.08285°W		1929	The tall Portland stone frontage is of a modified classical style and consists of five main storeys topped by a two-storey attic. The ground storey is arcaded with a central opening leading into a vaulted lobby. Shaped windows line the first floor mezzanine, corniced and pedimented windows adorn the second floor, and the floors above have plain windows. The roof contains a pair of end pavilions, and a central pediment topped with an open end tower sits on top. The plain east flank of the building is now exposed.
8, Lloyd's Avenue; 51.51171°N 0.07800°W		1908	A classical office building constructed from Portland stone, consisting of four storeys and a slated mansard roof. An order of polished grey granite Doric columns line the ground floor.
Credit Lyonnais; 51.51189°N 0.08567°W		1868	Originally built for Crédit Lyonnais, the ground floor is now occupied by a retail unit, with the upper floor by offices. Situated on a corner plot at the junction of Lombard Street and Gracechurch Street, each of the four storeys are lined by either pilasters of columns in between windows. The arched main entrance is situated on the Lombard Street elevation, and the exposed corner of the building is splayed with a further arched entrance.
Lloyd's Avenue House; 51.51180°N 0.07818°W		1900–14	Office building of stone construction, with a high-hipped slate roof over the four main storeys and two dormer floors. The elevation is laid out symmetrically around a centrally placed round-arched entrance set within an Ionic porch, and topped with a segmental pediment.
2, Royal Exchange Buildings; 51.51357°N 0.08757°W		1907–10	Four storey office block built from stone to the design of Sir Ernest George and Alfred Bowman Yeates. Twelve-window range to the main elevation, left elevation has a range of three windows, and a four window range to the right hand side, after a curved corner. The ground and first floors have alternately rusticated blocks forming a monumental base for the upper floors. A roof with tripartite dormers tops the southern half of the building.
1, 3 and 5, Stone House Court; 51.51667°N 0.08024°W		1928–31	The stone-faced shopping arcade was built to the design of Sir Albert Richardson and set at the rear of 65-66 Houndsditch. No. 1 consists of four storeys, with the ground storey being a shopfront projecting into a segmental bay and topped with a concave metal roof. A chamfered corner range with a set of double-doors is also present, and the upper three stories are set back from the ground floor. The other two buildings continue to the gothic shopfronts in the same style.
50, Cornhill and Attached Grilles; 51.51324°N 0.08515°W		1891–92	Former banking hall in use by Prescott, Dimsdale, Cave, Tugwell and Co Bank, now occupied by The Counting House public house. The building is of a polished Aberdeen granite and stone, Portland stone, and English bond brick construction. Four storeys and an attic tall, the top most storey is recessed behind a balustrade is not visible from ground-level. The ground storey has a pair of flat-arched entrances on each end, with two further arched bays in between; the first floor and attic windows have eared architraves, whilst the second floor windows are adorned with architraves and entablatures. Inside, the former banking hall reaches to the rear of the property and is illuminated by a glass dome set on a pilastered low drum, the white marble floor, hardwood panels, counters, and doors, and bronze war memorial are all extant.
13 and 14, Cornhill; 51.51317°N 0.08804°W		1910	Early 20th century office building of nine storeys over a basement, and a parapeted roof on top. Stylised Ionic pilasters adorn the ground floor, and further pilaster strips line the first floor. The second storey has banded rustication, and a segmental arch is present over the central fourth floor window. A projecting cornice stretches across the building at fifth floor level atoped with an iron railing in front of the set-back upper levels. Stone dormers are set in the lower mansard which form balconies to the floor above. A triumphal arch motif is set in the centre of the mansard.
HM Tower of London Liberty Boundary Markers; 51.50789°N 0.07924°W; 51.50806°N 0.07916°W; 51.50825°N 0.07908°W; 51.50827°N 0.07921°W; 51.50992°N 0.07824°W; 51.51033°N 0.07699°W; 51.51046°N 0.07698°W; 51.51022°N 0.07509°W		19th century onwards	Set of 8 boundary markers, marking the historical Liberties of the Tower of London; the other extant 14 are located within the London Borough of Tower Hamlets are listed separately. No. 1 is a square stone panel with the inscription W^D No.1. Boundary 12' 0" West, and set into the western wall of Tower Stairs. Presumably dates from post-WWII when this part of the wall was renewed. No. 2 is a stone panel inscribed with ^ WD and is located at the base of the boundary wall to the east of Tower Quay House. The lower part of the panel that bears its sequential number is set below ground. Dates from before 1861. No. 3 consists of a painted iron post with a rounded top, inscribed with ^ W.D. No.3., and set at the base of the boundary wall to the north of Three Quays House. Renewed from a stone marker post-1967. No. 4 consists of a painted iron post with a rounded top, inscribed with ^ W.D. No.4., and set at the base of the boundary wall to the north of Three Quays House. Possibly dates to 1868. No. 9 is a square metal plaque embossed with the writing 9 TL BM, and is set into the road surface at the junction of Trinity Square and Muscovy Street. Probably of mid-20th century origin. No. 11 consists of a painted iron post with a rounded top, inscribed with ^ W.D. No.11., located at the base of a wall in front of Trinity House, facing Trinity Square. Possibly of 1868 origin. No. 12 consists of a painted iron post with a rounded top, inscribed with ^ W.D. No.12., located at the base of a wall in front of Trinity House, facing Cooper's Row. Possibly of 1868 origin. No. 21 consists of a painted iron post with a rounded top, inscribed with ^ W.D. No.21., located at the base of a wall belonging to a London Metropolitan University building. Dates to 1868, however renewed and relocated post-WWII.
A pair of K6 telephone kiosks, Royal Exchange Buildings; 51.51359°N 0.08648°W		c1935	K6 type public telephone kiosk as designed by Sir Giles Gilbert Scott. Consist of a square kiosk of cast iron painted in red, topped with a domed roof, and with unperforated crowns adorning the top panel on each face.
