= The Palm Tree, Mile End =

Pub in Mile End Park, London

The Palm Tree
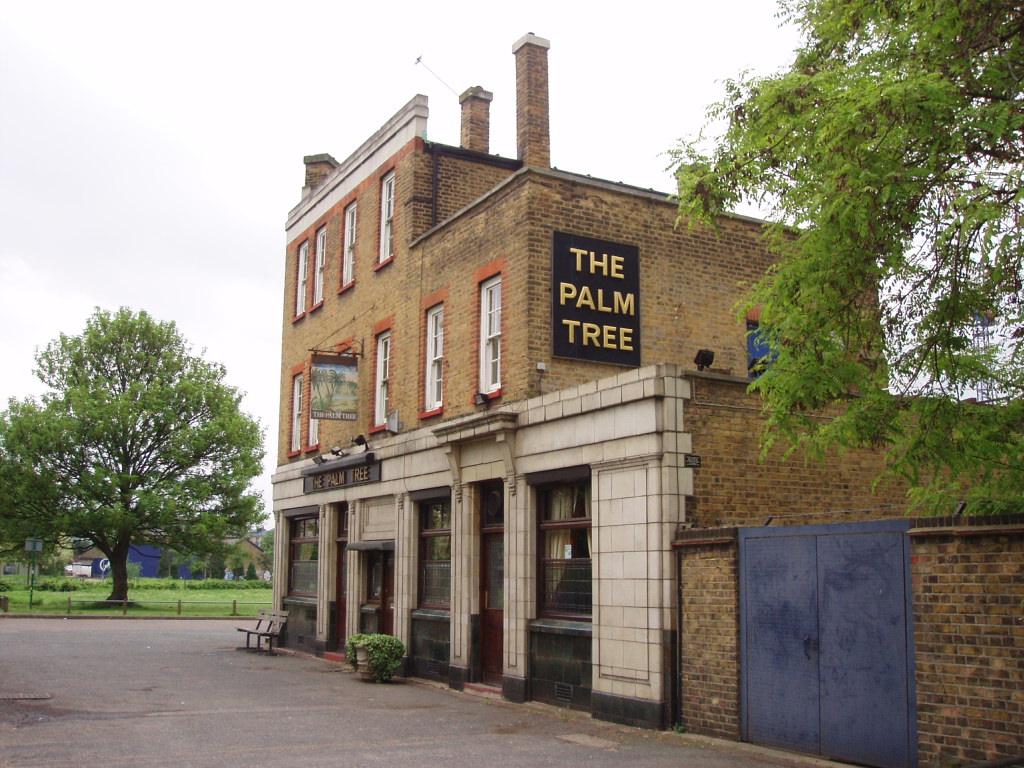
- The pub in 2006
- Interactive map of the The Palm Tree area

General information
- Location: 127 Grove Road, Mile End, London, England
- Coordinates: 51°31′45″N 0°02′27″W

The Palm Tree is a Grade II listed public house at 127 Grove Road, Mile End, and is within Mile End Park.

It was built in 1935 for Truman's Brewery and designed by Eedle and Meyers. Originally occupying the corner of a terraced street, The Palm Tree's surrounding buildings were heavily bombed during The Blitz, before being demolished and replaced by emergency Prefabs. These too were eventually demolished, leaving only the pub standing.

It was Grade II listed in 2015 by Historic England.

The pub was used as a filming location during the TV series Luther for the third episode of the third series and the 2010 short film Half Hearted.

In 2024 the Guardian reported that "In the Palm Tree pub, east London, barman Alf is taking only cash at the rattling 1960s till. The building, which is Grade II-listed, stands in the middle of Mile End Park, and Alf has worked here since 1976."

Time Out ranked the pub at 5th in its list of best pubs in London.

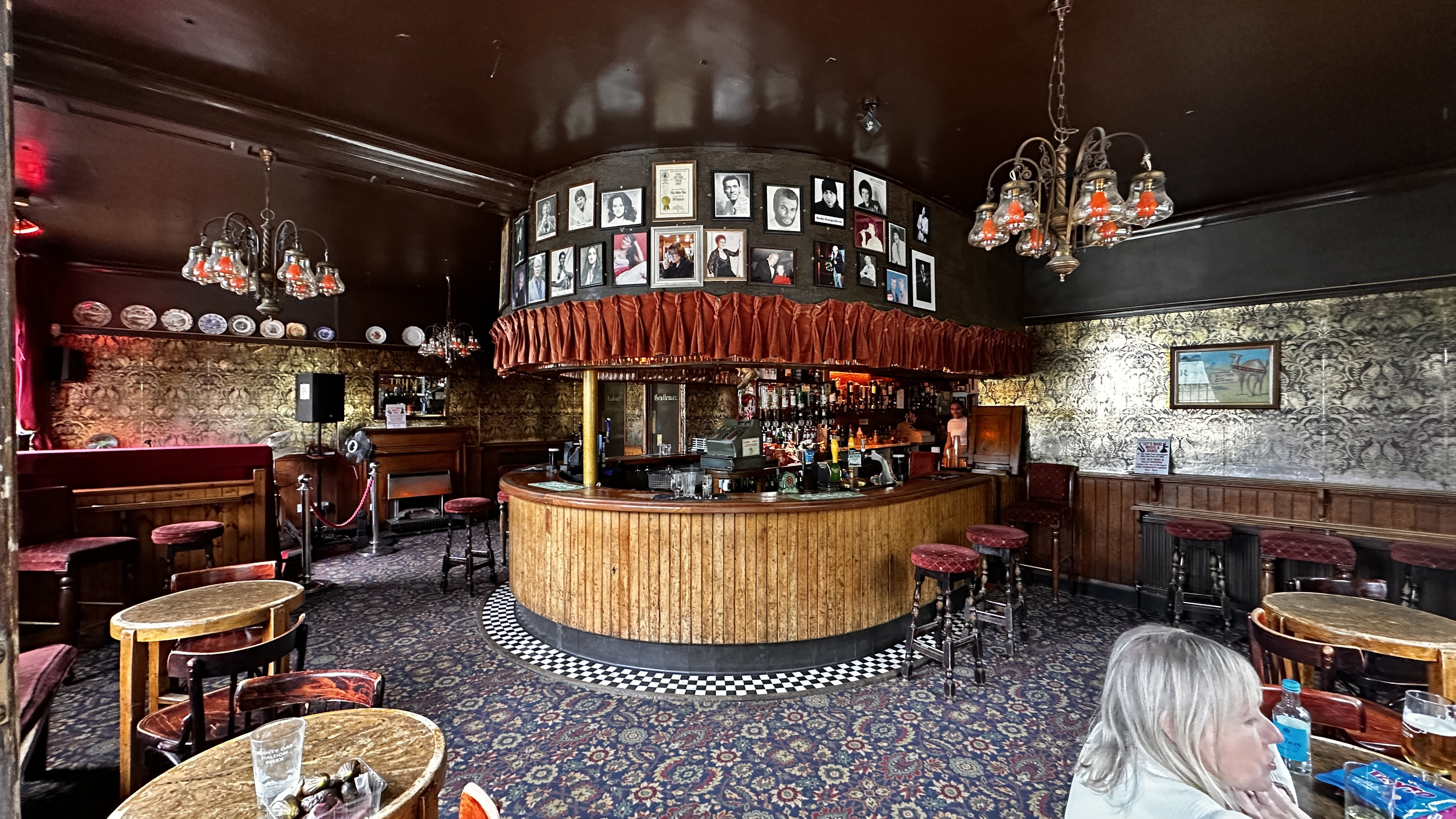
Inside The Palm Tree pub, 7 August 2025
