= Eedle and Meyers =

British architecture firm

Eedle and Meyers were a British firm of architects, co-founded by Frederick James Eedle (1863–1953) and Sydney Herbert Meyers.

Eedle and Meyers specialised in pub design from the 1880s to 1946.

They designed The Palm Tree, a public house, built in 1935 for Truman's Brewery, at 127 Grove Road, Mile End, London, E3 5RP. It was Grade II listed in 2015 by Historic England.

Three more of their London pubs are Grade II listed: The Old Red Lion, Islington (1899), The Angel, Islington (1903) and Rayners, Rayners Lane (1937). All of these pubs, except the Old Red Lion, were built for Truman's.
