= Hills & Saunders =

Photographic studio in London, United Kingdom

- Industry: Photography
- Founded: Oxford, England June 1860
- Headquarters: Dorney Reach, Maidenhead
- Parent: Gillman & Soame
- Website: hillsandsaunders.co.uk

Hills & Saunders was one of the leading Victorian photographic firms, started in 1860 as a partnership between Robert Hills, a hairdresser and wigmaker, and John Henry Saunders (1836–1890). They were social photographers with studios at different times in: London (society), Harrow, Eton, and Rugby, all locations of leading schools, Oxford and Cambridge, and Aldershot & Sandhurst (centres of the British army). They were successful, being appointed as photographers to members of the royal family, including the Prince of Wales and Princess Beatrice, and they were given a Royal Warrant as photographers to Queen Victoria in 1867; many of their photographs are still in the Royal Collection. However, the network of branches did not remain united. The partnership of Robert Hills and John Henry Saunders was dissolved in 1889, although members of both families continued to operate local branches under the same name. Only the two main school branches, at Eton and Harrow, continued well into the 20th Century. Ultimately the Harrow business closed and the photo archive was acquired by the school, but the Eton business survived into the 21st century. In 2019 the historic company was acquired by its Oxfordshire based contemporary, Gillman & Soame, in order to preserve the extensive archives and ensure the future of the prestigious Victorian photographic studio.

== Studios ==
London Studios
1868-1869 - 48 Porchester Terrace, Bayswater, Kensington
1868-1886 - 36 Porchester Terrace, Bayswater, Kensington
1893-1895 - 47 Sloane Street, Chelsea
Negatives / records believed destroyed
Studio no longer exists

Harrow Studio
1861 - first recorded date in records
1865 - first advertisement
Closed in the 1980s
Negatives / records still exist - and can be found at Iconic Photographs

Eton Studio 1864-1894
to date.
still going - Hills & Saunders is owned currently by Richard Shymansky ABIPP, AMPA and is now based in Dorney Reach, Maidenhead, but is still the Eton studio.
Negatives / some of the records believed destroyed

Rugby Studio
dates unknown - listed on CDV as a studio
Negatives / records believed destroyed
Studio no longer exists

Oxford Studio
1856-1935
Taken over by Gillman & Soame in Oxford 1931
Negatives / records believed destroyed
Studio no longer exists under original name.

Cambridge Studio
Dates unknown but bankrupt by 1892
Negatives / records believed destroyed
Studio no longer exists

Aldershot Studio
1865-1879
Negatives / records believed destroyed
Studio no longer exists

Sandhurst Studio
Dates unknown
Negatives / records believed destroyed
Studio no longer exists

Yorktown Studio
Dates unknown
Negatives / records believed destroyed
Studio no longer exists

Evidence of the existence of the Aldershot & Yorktown and other studios can be found here: http://whowerethey.wordpress.com/category/photographer/hills-saunders/
