= Grade II listed buildings in the London Borough of Bromley =

This page is a list of the Grade II listed buildings in the London Borough of Bromley.

== Listed buildings ==
Name	Location	Type	Completed (Note: The date given is the date used by Historic England as significant for the initial building or that of an important part in the structure's description.)	Date designated	Grid ref. (Note: Sometimes known as OSGB36, the grid reference is based on the British national grid reference system used by the Ordnance Survey.) Geo-coordinates	Entry number (Note: The "List Entry Number" is a unique number assigned to each listed building and scheduled monument by Historic England.)	Image
1 and 2 Commonside	Keston			29 June 1973		1068719	Upload Photo
1-3 Whites Cottages				23 February 1988		1299023	Upload Photo
17 Bickley Road	Bickley			29 June 1973		1064310	Upload Photo
26 The Avenue	Bickley			26 October 2022		1481525	Upload Photo
35A Chislehurst Road	Bickley			1 July 1997		1245302	Upload Photo
Archway and Walling in Front of Nos 2 and 4 Bickley Road	Widmore			10 January 1995		1064309	Upload Photo
Beechcroft	Bickley			29 June 1973		1359373	Upload Photo
Bickley Court	Bickley			24 April 2007		1391941	Upload Photo
Bickley War Memorial	Bickley			16 August 2019		1465460	Bickley War Memorial More images
Bird in Hand Public House	Widmore	Public house		29 June 1973		1359372	Upload Photo
Church of Saint George	Bickley	Church		29 June 1973		1064311	Church of Saint George More images
Church of Saint John the Evangelist	Bromley	Church		8 August 2011		1400592	Church of Saint John the Evangelist More images
Crosshand	Bickley	House		24 April 2007		1391942	Upload Photo
Heathbank	Bickley			5 March 1973		1299041	Upload Photo
Keston Court	Keston			29 June 1973		1186784	Upload Photo
Keston War Memorial	Keston	War memorial		8 June 2015		1426522	Keston War Memorial More images
Leafy Grove Court	Keston	House		29 June 1973		1359321	Leafy Grove Court More images
Penge War Memorial	Penge	War memorial		31 January 2017		1441839	Penge War Memorial More images
Priors Farmhouse	Keston	House		29 June 1973		1064383	Upload Photo
Lyndhurst	Bickley			2 December 1982		1254222	Upload Photo
Old Timbers	Widmore			10 January 1955		1101749	Upload Photo
Shortlands War Memorial	Shortlands	War memorial		15 May 2014		1419841	Shortlands War Memorial More images
Stotfold	Widmore			23 December 1993		1298990	Upload Photo
The Old Cottage	Widmore			10 January 1955		1064308	Upload Photo
The Studio	Beckenham			17 June 2004		1390855	The Studio More images
Two Lodges to Beckenham Place	Beckenham			29 May 1973		1049077	Two Lodges to Beckenham Place
Water Trough at Widmore Green	Widmore			28 April 2006		1391636	Water Trough at Widmore Green
Well Cottage	Widmore			29 June 1973		1359341	Upload Photo

== See also ==
- Grade I and II* listed buildings in the London Borough of Bromley
