= The Castle, Harrow =

Listed pub in London, England

The Castle
- The pub in 2025

- Location within London Borough of Harrow Location within Greater London
- Alternative names: Castle Inn

General information
- Type: Public house
- Location: 30 West Street, Harrow on the Hill, London, England
- Coordinates: 51°34′19″N 0°20′24″W
- Year built: 1901; 125 years ago
- Owner: Fuller's

Design and construction
- Designations

Listed Building – Grade II
- Official name: The Castle public house
- Designated: 8 March 1999
- Reference no.: 1356867

Website
- castleharrow.com

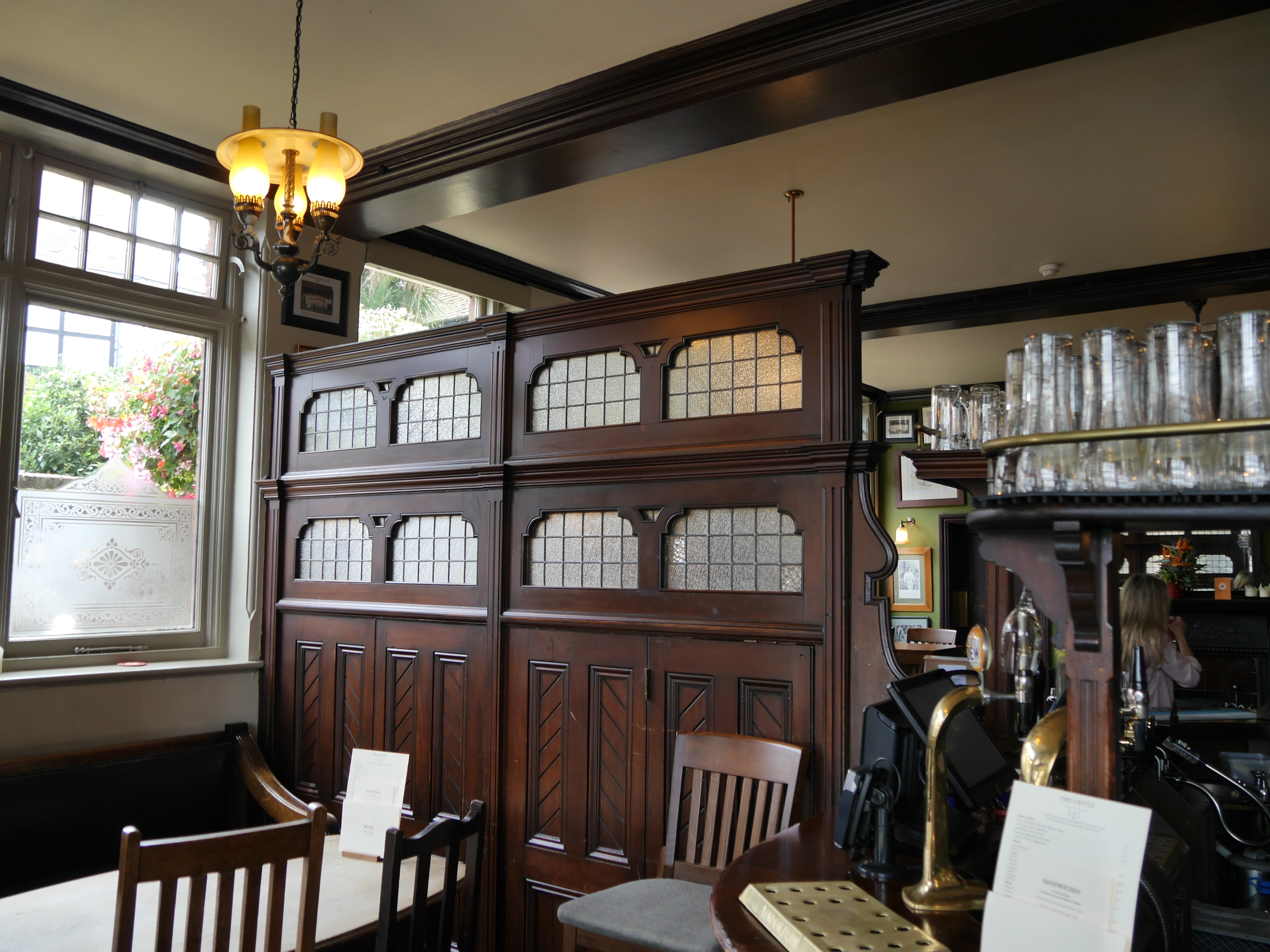
The interior in 2015

The Castle is a Grade II listed public house on West Street in Harrow on the Hill, London, England. The pub's origins can be traced to at least 1716, although the present building dates from 1901. It is included on the Campaign for Real Ale's (CAMRA) National Inventory of Historic Pub Interiors, where its interior is rated three stars and described as being of "outstanding national historic importance".

== History ==
The origins of The Castle can be traced to at least 1716. The present public house, which stands close to Harrow School, was constructed in 1901.

On 8 March 1999, The Castle was designated a Grade II listed building. It was included on the Campaign for Real Ale (CAMRA)'s National Inventory of Historic Pub Interiors before the inventory's grading system was revised. Under the revised scheme, it is rated three stars and its interior is regarded as being "of outstanding national historic importance". According to CAMRA, the pub operates on a tenanted basis and forms part of a small pub company. As of October 2026 the freehold was owned by Fuller's Brewery.

== Architecture ==
=== Exterior ===
The building is constructed of red brick, with the upper floors finished in a rough render and painted exterior beneath tiled roofs. It has two storeys with attic accommodation and a symmetrical frontage. The central section projects slightly and contains a large multi-pane window, while the ground-floor windows feature decorative etched glass. A continuous moulded band runs across the front and continues around the side elevations.

The main entrance is set back from the street and framed by brick supports with painted decorative columns. It retains part-glazed double doors and a leaded window beside the entrance. The upper floor contains sash windows, one of which has been obscured by signage. Above, the gable contains a further sash window and a datestone bearing the year 1901. Several chimney stacks rise from the roof.

On the eastern side, the elevation includes a series of multi-pane windows and separate entrances to former off-sales and club-room areas. These doorways have glazed upper sections and decorative surrounds beneath a continuous moulded band. Additional windows are located further along the elevation, with sash windows at first-floor level and in the attic gable, some of which are partly concealed by signage.

=== Interior ===
The interior retains a saloon bar, a simpler public bar and a former billiard room. A separate off-sales area once occupied part of the building, but the dividing partition has been removed and the space incorporated into the rear bar. Decorative wall coverings survive in places, and the saloon bar retains a cast-iron fireplace in the south wall. A glazed timber screen, now repositioned from its original location, separates the principal rooms, while a low doorway within the screen formerly provided staff access between them.

The saloon bar retains a central timber counter, mirrored bar back and glass shelving. Its entrance vestibule survives, as does the historic numbering used to identify the different rooms. The public bar also retains its original curved counter, together with a cast-iron fireplace and overmantel mirror. The rear bar preserves further original fittings, including bar shelving, mirrored features and a disused serving hatch.

The former billiard room remains at the rear of the building and retains its timber flooring, decorative wall treatment and fireplace surround, although some features have been altered. Two smaller rooms survive on the right-hand side of the plan. One retains a cast-iron fireplace and a small internal window linking it with the servery, while the other was formerly served through a hatch from the bar. Elsewhere, later alterations include the removal of one internal partition, refurbishment of the gentlemen's toilets and the loss or modification of some original fittings.
