= Rayners, Rayners Lane =

Pub in Rayners Lane, London

Coordinates: 51.577316°N 0.369448°W

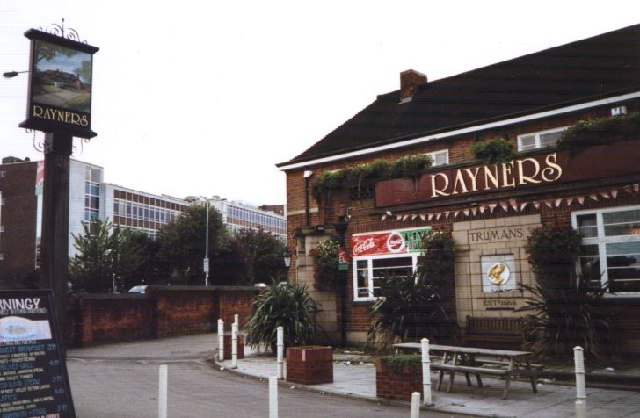
Rayners, 2006

Rayners is a Grade II listed public house at 23 Village Way East, Rayners Lane, Harrow, London HA2 7LX. It is notable as the location of British singer Amy Winehouse's first performance.

It was built in 1937 for Truman's Brewery, and designed by the architects Eedle and Meyers. It was Grade II listed in 2006 by Historic England.

It closed as a public house in 2006, and became occupied by the Christ the Redeemer religious training college.

== See also ==
- List of pubs in London
