= Grade II listed buildings in the City of London (WC and E) =

The City of London is a major business and financial centre in London, England. It contains over 600 listed buildings that are recorded in the National Heritage List for England. Of these, over 400 are assessed to be at Grade II, the lowest grade. This list contains the Grade II listed buildings in the elements of the WC and E postal districts that include a small part of the city.

== Buildings ==
Name and location	Photograph	Date	Notes
Obelisk Marking City Boundary on South Side of Road; 51.51826°N 0.11120°W		Mid-19th century	An obelisk marking the boundary of the City of London with the London Borough of Camden, situated on the south side of High Holborn. Constructed from granite with a gilded griffin mounted on top. A matching obelisk on the opposite side of the road is in the Borough of Camden.
Gatepiers at Entrance to Port of London Authority's Warehouses; 51.51616°N 0.07833°W		Early 19th century	Early 19th century gate piers of plain Portland stone, with subsidiary foot entrances flanking either side.
House to East of Entrance to Port of London Authority's Warehouses; 51.51614°N 0.078130°W		c1800	Consisting of three storeys, the former house is of yellow brick with painted dressings under a slated mansard roof. There are screen walls either side with segmented arched carriageways, cornice, and blocking.
Pair of Houses to North of Entrance to Port of London Authority's Warehouses; 51.51633°N 0.078483°W		c1800	Two house that are similar to the previously listed house to the east of the warehouse entrance, but without the screen walls, and with some alterations.
Walls, Railings and Lamps to Front of Public Record Office; 51.51489°N 0.11133°W		1891–96	Added as part of Sir John Taylor's extension of the building that now serves as the Maughan Library. The walls are of rock-faced Portland stone with ashlar dressings and are topped with wrought iron Gothic railings. There are also a number of Gothic lamps on top of piers.
Post at Corner of Worship Street; 51.52143°N 0.07877°W		Early to mid-19th century	A cast gunpost topped with a City of London gilded griffin.
Number 7 and 8 and Attached Railings; 51.51786°N 0.11093°W		1731–34	A pair of terraced chambers that were restored in the 19th century, and rebuilt externally in 1955 by Sir Edward Maufe due to war damage. They are of a brown brick construction with red brick dressings, and moulded brick cornices to the second floor level. A tiled mansard roof tops the three storey building, and the entrances are accessed by a steps with attached railing.
9 and 10, Staple Inn; 51.51763°N 0.11095°W		1729 and 1747	A pair of terraced chambers that were restored in the 19th century, and rebuilt externally in 1955 by Sir Edward Maufe due to war damage. Constructed from brown brick with red dressings, with a tile mansard roof covering the three storeys. The doorways are accessed by the use of steps with attached railings.
Staple Inn Buildings North and South and Attached Railings; 51.51797°N 0.11146°W		c1903	The buildings were constructed as a set of offices, with a shop later added to the ground floor. They are of red brick with terracotta dressings with granite facing to the ground floor, and slate roof in Jacobean style. The High Holborn frontage is of five storeys whilst the two storeys behind are of two, and there is a polygonal corner turret on the southeast corner. Down the eastern elevation of the building is a row of wrought iron railings on top of a low stone plinth.
The Hall and Attached Railings; 51.51767°N 0.11127°W		1581	Although the hall was originally built in 1581, it was largely destroyed in the Second World War and built in facsimile by Sir Edward Maufe. It is of brown brick with stone dressings, and a slate roof with a parapet covers the single storey, with a cupola with a bell at the west end. The north facade faces in to Staple Inn Court and includes the attached railings. There is a Gothic doorway dated to 1753 on the south elevation with a 1757 clock mounted over the top. Inside the building there is a hammerbeam roof with Jacobean panelling at the west end underneath a gallery.
14, Brushfield Street; 51.51884°N 0.07843°W		1784–85	A four-storey townhouse of Flemish bond brick construction with a gambrel roof and brick end chimney stack. A 19th century shopfront is present on the ground floor, and the interior retains its panelled doors, dados and shutters, and dog-leg staircase.
Temple Bar Memorial in Centre of Road; 51.51369°N 0.11191°W		1880	The memorial stands in the centre of the road at the boundary of the City of London with the City of Westminster. Designed by Sir Horace Jones and sculptured by Sir Joseph Edgar Boehm, Bt., it is of granite and bronze and situated atop a stone pedestal with statues of Queen Victoria and Edward VII at either side. A silver dragon sculptured by Charles Bell Birch is mounted at the top of the monument.
Lamp Post in Staple Inn Court; 51.51781°N 0.11112°W		19th century	A 19th century lamp post of cast iron, with a Windsor pattern lantern and ladder bar at the top.
The Institute of Actuaries and Attached Railings; 51.51783°N 0.11141°W		1757–59	A terrace of three chambers each of three storeys. The buildings were externally rebuilt facsimile by Sir Edward Maufe in 1955 due to damage from Second World War bombing. They consist of brown brick with red brick dressings and a tiled mansard roof with dormers. Served as the offices for the Institute of Actuaries, and number 1 still retains the institute's council chambers and associated rooms. Number 2 and 3 have attached cast iron railings.
10, Brushfield Street; 51.51883°N 0.07857°W		Late 18th century	Four storeys of yellow stock brick, with a timber shopfront on the ground floor. A plain coped parapet surrounds the slate roof.
24 and 25, Widegate Street; 51.51818°N 0.07844°W		c1720	A pair of three storey former houses, consisting of a painted brick front elevation with a 19th-century shopfront. The interior of number 25 is largely intact, including panelled partitions, staircase, panelling, china cupboard, and a 19th-century chimneypiece.
