= Ibex House =

Art Deco office building in London, England

Coordinates: 51°30′43″N 0°04′29″W

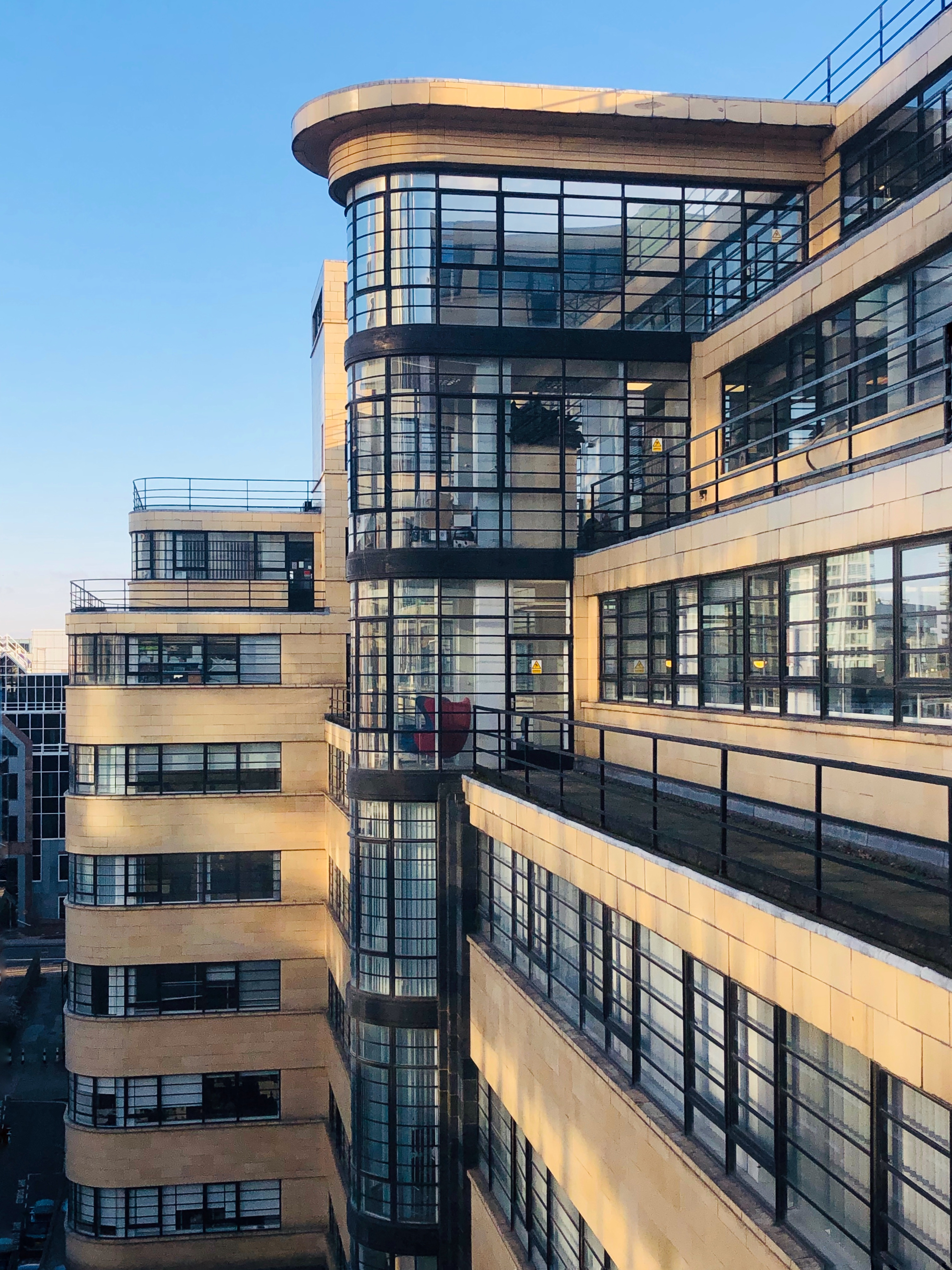
North façade on Haydon Street, 2018

Ibex House is an eleven storey Art Deco office building on the east side of the City of London, just to the north of the Tower of London. It was designed by Fuller, Hall and Foulsham in the Streamline Moderne style, with curved corners and distinctive horizontal bands of faience cladding and black-framed fenestration. Construction started as a speculative development in 1935 and the building was completed in 1937. It became a Grade II listed building in 1982.

The building occupies about 0.75 acres (3,000 m^{2}), almost half of the narrow block running between the Minories to the west and Mansell Street to the east, with Portsoken Street to the south and Haydon Street to the north. It has an elongated H- or I-shaped footprint, with blocks towards the east and west joined by a long thin central block. The arrangement provides ample natural light to the office space within. Most of the building rises to seven or eight upper floors, with top floors stepped back, plus a ground and lower ground floor and basement.

It was built using a steel frame with distinctive strips of faience cladding, black on the ground floor and buff on upper floors, between long strips of windows with black metal frames and horizontal glazing bars. Pevsner mentioned its "Long bands of glass, whizzing round curved corners". Curved glazed projections at the centre of the north and south façades run from the first to the top floor. The centre of the façade above the main west entrance is emphasised with a vertical black faience strip with glazing, running from the first to the top floor, with similar vertical black faience strips above entrances in the sides of the east and west blocks. The building houses 191,144 sq ft (17,757.9 m^{2}) of commercial and office space, occupied by a variety of businesses, including the main offices of PLP Architecture. The ground floor alongside the Minories contains a number of retail units, which for many years included a public house and a sandwich bar. Until recently, most of the lower ground floor and basement was occupied by a Virgin Active health club.

As a largely unchanged example of a late 1930s office building, it became a Grade II listed building in 1982 in recognition of its architectural integrity.

The building was restored (including the replacement of all the faience) by the architects Rolfe Judd in 1994-94, and sold around 2019 for a price of around £121 million.

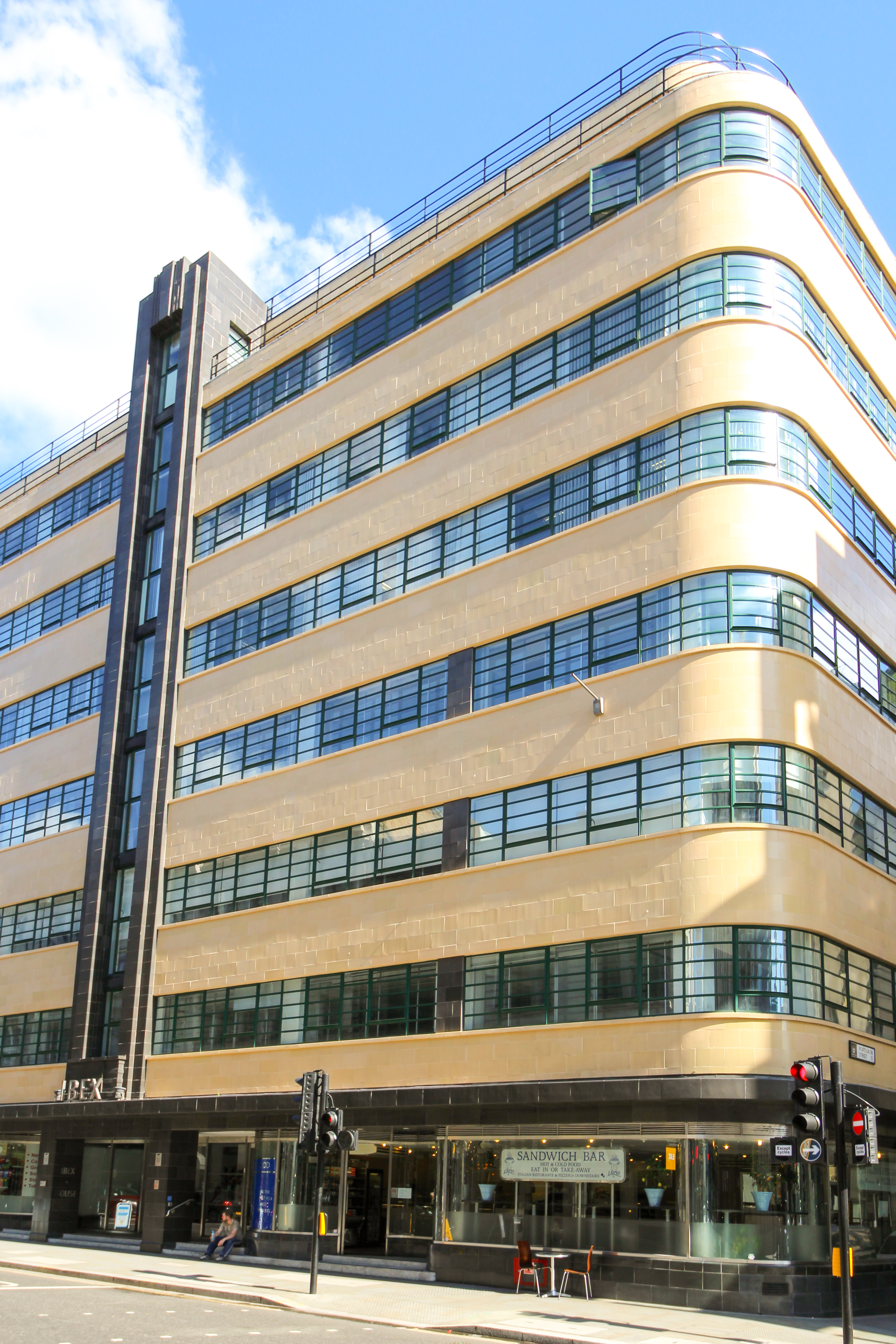
Corner of Minories and Portsoken Street, 2015

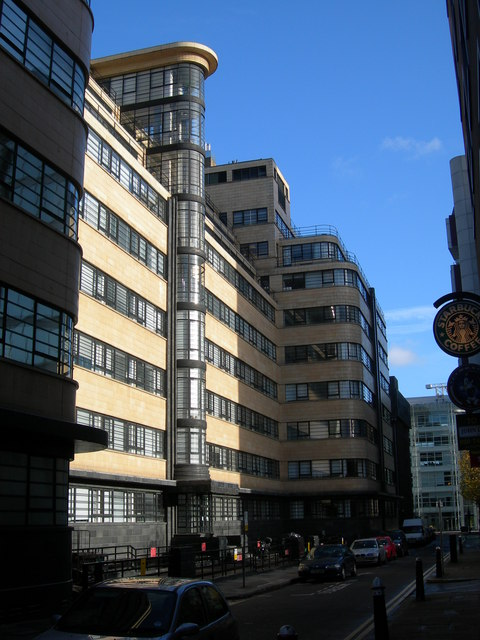
South façade on Portsoken Street, 2006
