= The Ship Tavern, Lime Street =

Former pub on Lime Street, City of London

Coordinates: 51.512016°N 0.0834785°W

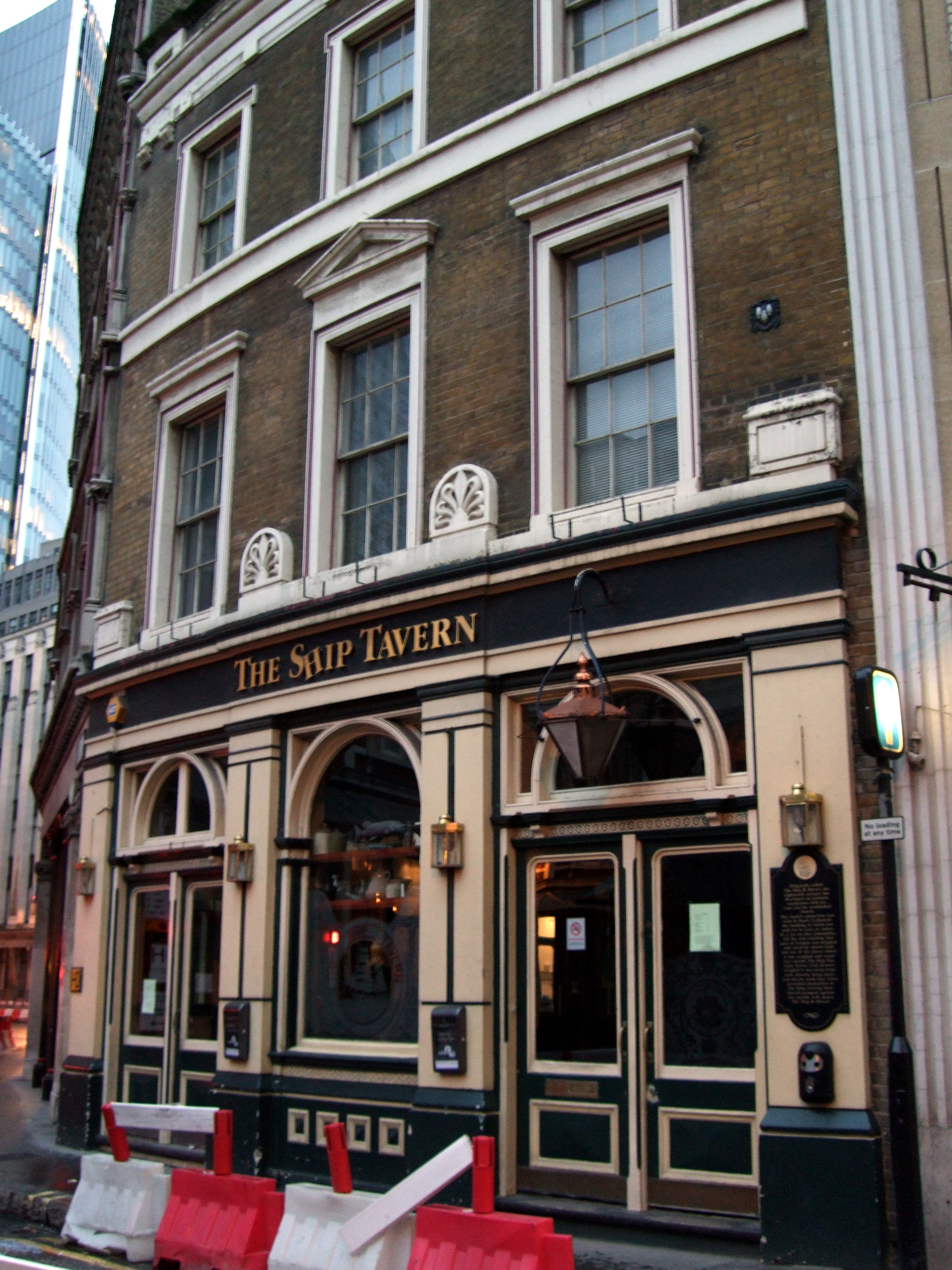
The Ship Tavern, Lime Street, in 2008

The Ship was a pub at 27 Lime Street, London EC3.

The building is a Grade II listed building, built in the mid-19th century.

The pub closed in 2010 and the building is now a Nando's restaurant.
