= Harrow on the Hill =

Residential area of north west London, England

Coordinates: 51.565496°N 0.332716°W

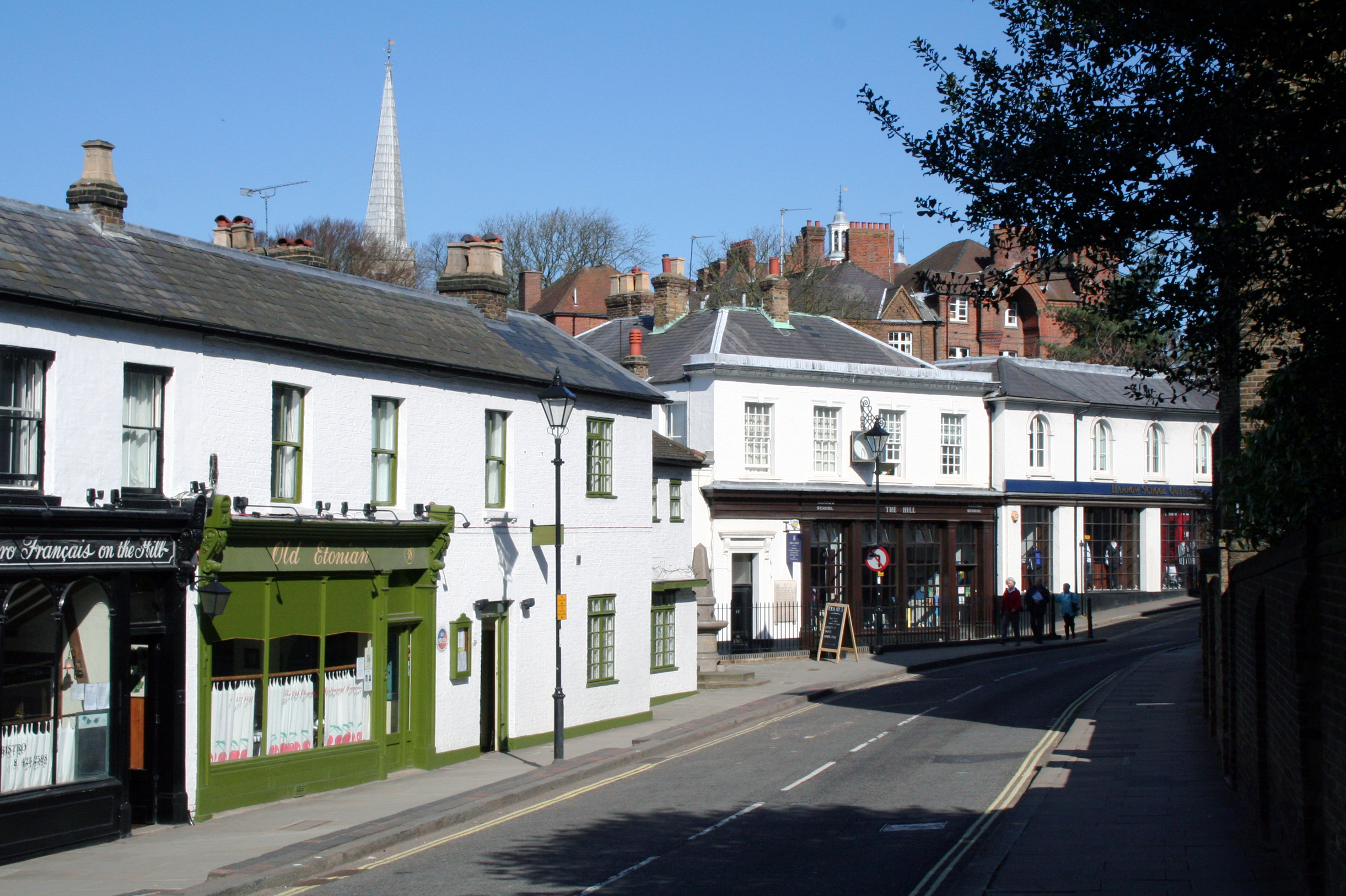
- Harrow-on-the-Hill High Street (36-40 in picture), with the spire of St Mary's Church visible in the background At Centre: Listed Drinking Fountain

- Location within Greater London
- Population: 12,270 (2011 Census.Ward)
- OS grid reference: TQ155865
- London borough: Harrow
- Ceremonial county: Greater London
- Region: London
- Country: England
- Sovereign state: United Kingdom
- Post town: HARROW
- Postcode district: HA1
- Dialling code: 020
- Police: Metropolitan
- Fire: London
- Ambulance: London
- UK Parliament: Harrow West
- London Assembly: Brent and Harrow

Harrow on the Hill or Harrow-on-the-Hill is an area and historic town in the London Borough of Harrow in north-west London, England. The name refers to Harrow Hill, 408 feet (124 m), and is located some half a mile south of the modern town of Harrow. The village dates back to early medieval times, built around the 11th-century St Mary's Church, and is the location of three schools, namely, Harrow, St Dominic's and John Lyon.

== Etymology ==
Etymology before 1398 derives from Harrow, & The Saxon Chronicles/The Peterborough Chronicle, which first recorded Harrow Hill in 767 as Gumeninga Hergae. A suggested meaning is "heathen temple" of a tribe called the 'Gumeningas', sons of Gumen. One of the earliest recorded uses of the name is found in 1398 as Harrowe atte Hille. The hill has historically been used as a place of pagan worship. It is alternatively explained to mean the church upon the hill.

== History ==
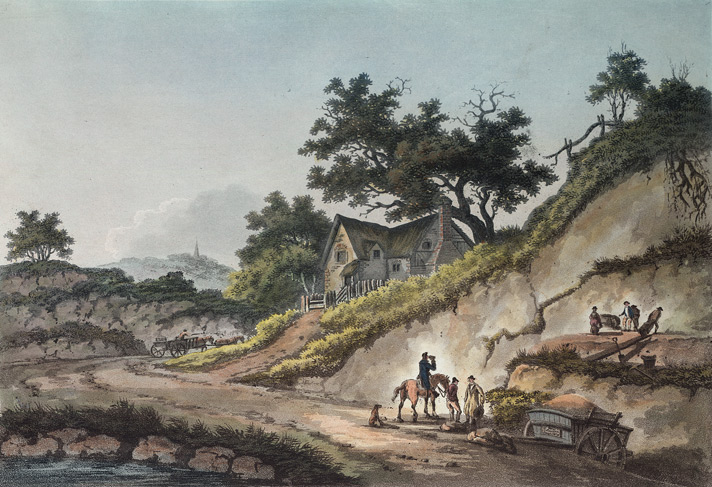
View near Harrow on the Hill, spire of St Mary's Church visible in the distance. Francis Jukes, 1798.

Harrow on the Hill was an ancient parish in the Gore hundred of Middlesex. The parish historically covered a large rural area surrounding the hilltop settlement itself, extending to Pinner, Harrow Weald, Wealdstone and Wembley. Pinner became a separate parish in 1766. In 1831, the parish of Harrow on the Hill had a population of 3,861 and occupied an area of 9,870 acres (39.9 km^{2}). In 1850 a local board district was established for the central part of the parish, including the main village and the adjoining hamlets of Greenhill, Roxeth, and Sudbury.

Following the opening of Harrow-on-the-Hill station in 1880, a new town centre grew up around the station, which was at the northern foot of the hill, in the Greenhill area. The new town centre became known simply as Harrow to distinguish it from the older village on the hill.

The Local Government Act 1894 converted local board districts such as Harrow-on-the-Hill into urban districts, and established elected parish and district councils. It also said that parishes could no longer straddle district boundaries. The parish of Harrow-on-the-Hill was reduced to just cover the urban district, and the remainder of the parish was split into three parishes called Harrow Weald, Wealdstone and Wembley (with the latter two also being made urban districts at the same time).

By 1931, the parish occupied a reduced area of 2,129 acres (8.62 km^{2}) and had a population of 26,380. A county review order in 1934 abolished the neighbouring urban district of Wealdstone and parishes of Harrow Weald, Pinner, Great Stanmore and Little Stanmore, merging them with the urban district of Harrow-on-the Hill to become an enlarged urban district that was called just Harrow rather than Harrow on the Hill. On 1 April 1934 the parish of Harrow on the Hill was abolished to form Harrow, part also went to Wembley and Ealing. In 1954, Harrow was incorporated to become a municipal borough. The same area became the London Borough of Harrow in 1965, when it was transferred from Middlesex to Greater London.

== King Charles I ==
On 27 April 1646, King Charles I, when fleeing Oxford on his way to Southwell, where he was due to surrender to the Scottish Army, stopped at Harrow on the Hill near St Mary's Church, so that he could take a final glimpse at London and also to water his horses. A plaque on Grove Hill near Harrow School marks the spot, and also says that the spring below has ever since been called King Charles' Well.

== Photo record ==
The Hills & Saunders photography company had a studio on Harrow on the Hill in the 1860s photographing the schools, families and local area. The archive of c. 80,000 glass plates still exists and much of it is online at the Harrow Photos website.

== Demography ==
The population of the Harrow on the Hill ward of the London Borough of Harrow was 9,578 in 1991 and 10,632 in 2001. It occupies an area of 357 hectares though the hill itself occupies approximately 100 hectares (250 acres) and in 2001 had a population density of 29.74 persons per hectare. There were 4,539 households in the district in 2001. The ward's boundaries encompass the majority of the hill and also Roxeth, Sudbury Hill and parts of West Harrow.

The 2011 census showed ethnically Whites were largest at 47.3% (34.4% British, 9.6% "Other White" excluding Irish), 35.4% were Asian (19.1% Indian, 11.6% "Other Asian"). The most spoken foreign languages were Gujarati followed by Tamil. The Asian community in Harrow is among the most affluent in the UK. Of the over 4,500 households, the amount of whole house/bungalow and of flat/maisonette accommodations are about evenly split; 57.6% of property tenures are owned, 28.8% are privately rented, and 13.8% are socially rented. A relatively large share of residents, 28.4%, have a professional occupation. The unemployment rate for working people was 4.1%. The median age was 33.5 years.

== Politics ==
Harrow on the Hill is part of the Harrow West constituency for elections to the House of Commons.

Harrow on the Hill is part of the Harrow on the Hill ward for elections to Harrow London Borough Council.

== Gallery ==
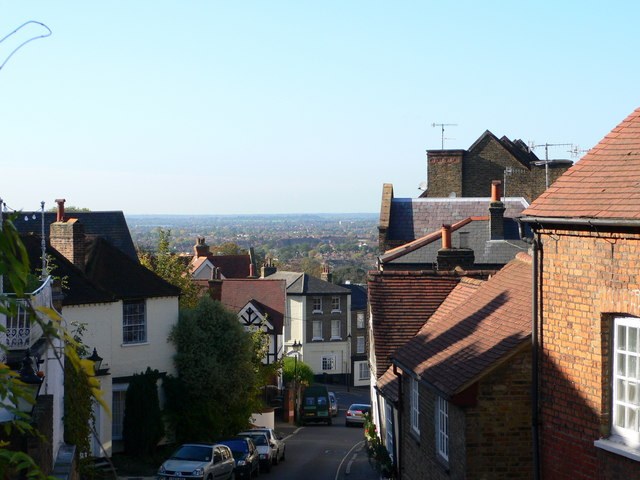
West Street
By the drinking fountain
Aspect: west

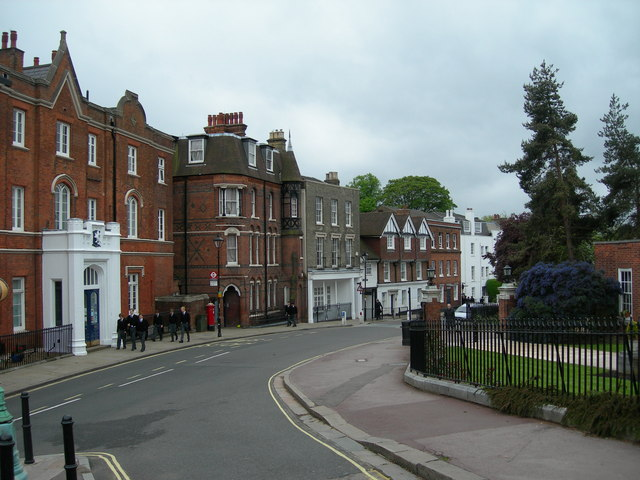
View of the north of the High Street
Taken from the junction of Church Hill
Some of the buildings are those of Harrow School

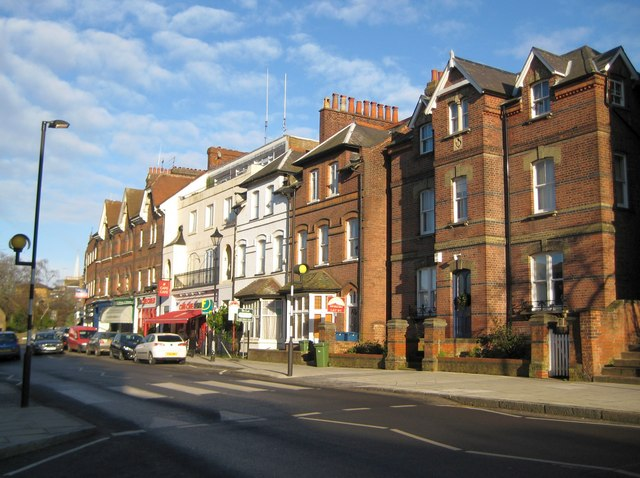
The High Street
A marginally lower section nearby to the south, in the conservation area

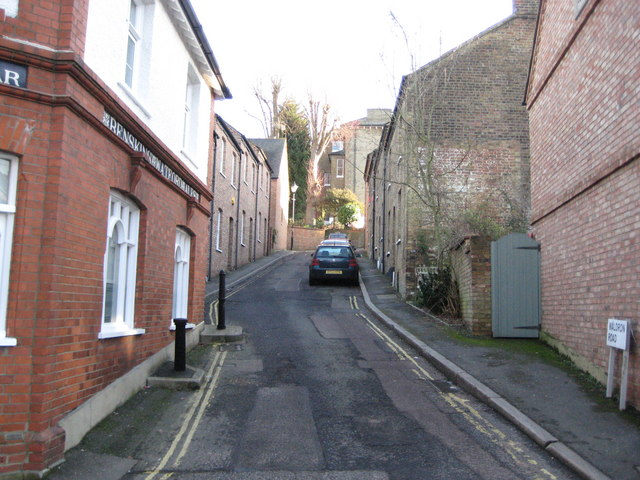
Waldron Road
A very narrow two way road by London standards, also close to Harrow School

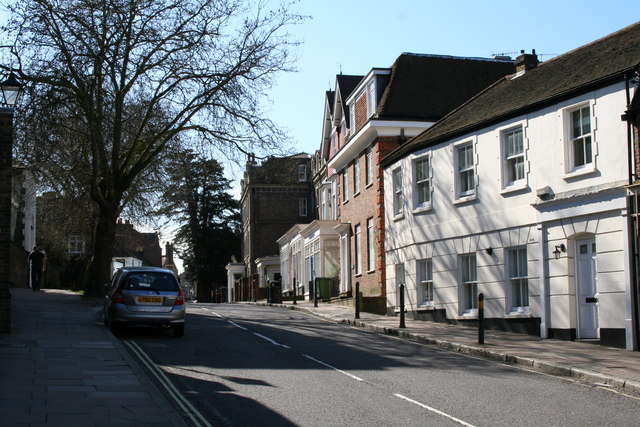
High Street - the south end

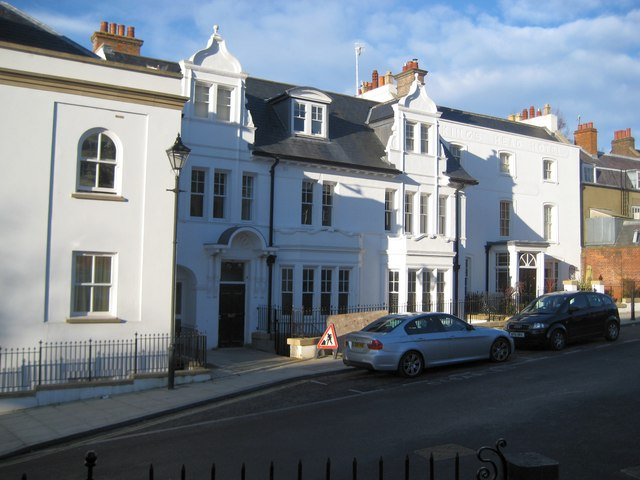
Former public house and coaching inn

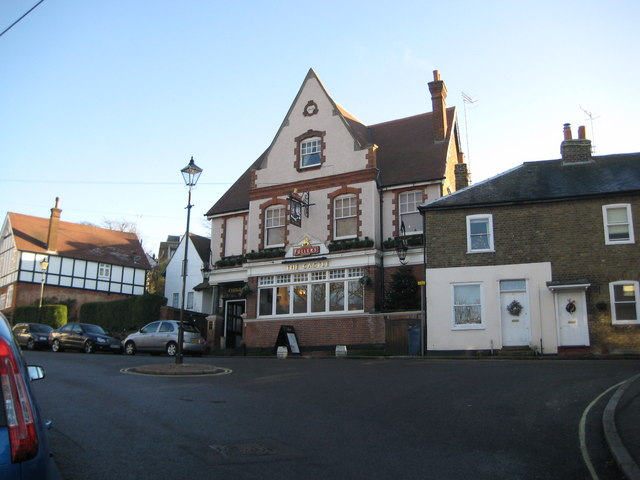
The Castle, West Street

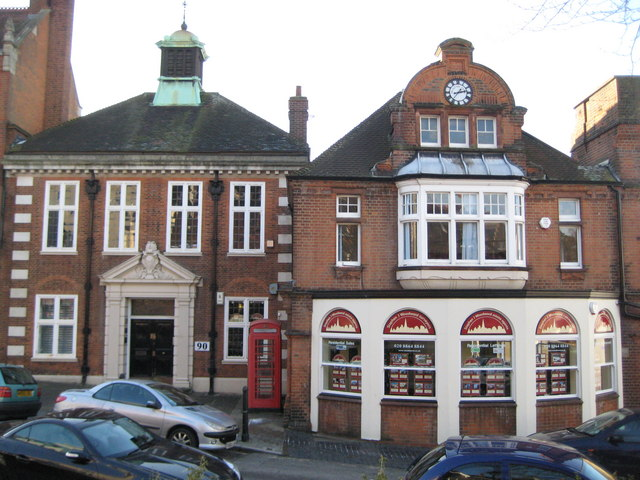
The former fire station (right) now an estate agent, and on the left the former headquarters of Harrow Urban District (now the London Borough of Harrow)

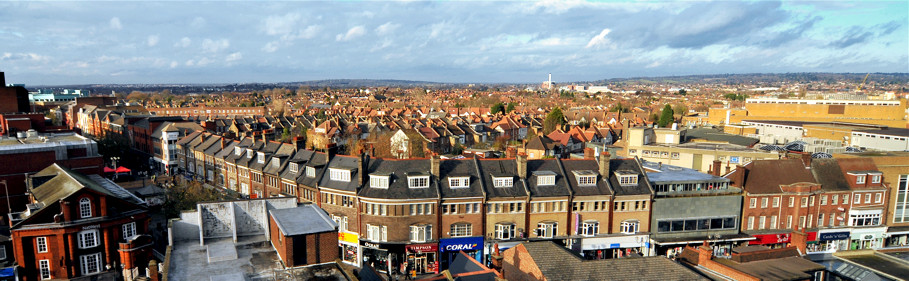
Partial Panorama looking northwest towards Pinner (left) and Headstone (right) from building at the bottom of the northern downslope of Harrow on the Hill (200m north of the mainline station) - the listed building on the left in the foreground is 315 Station Road, Harrow,
closest to the hill itself, currently occupied by NatWest

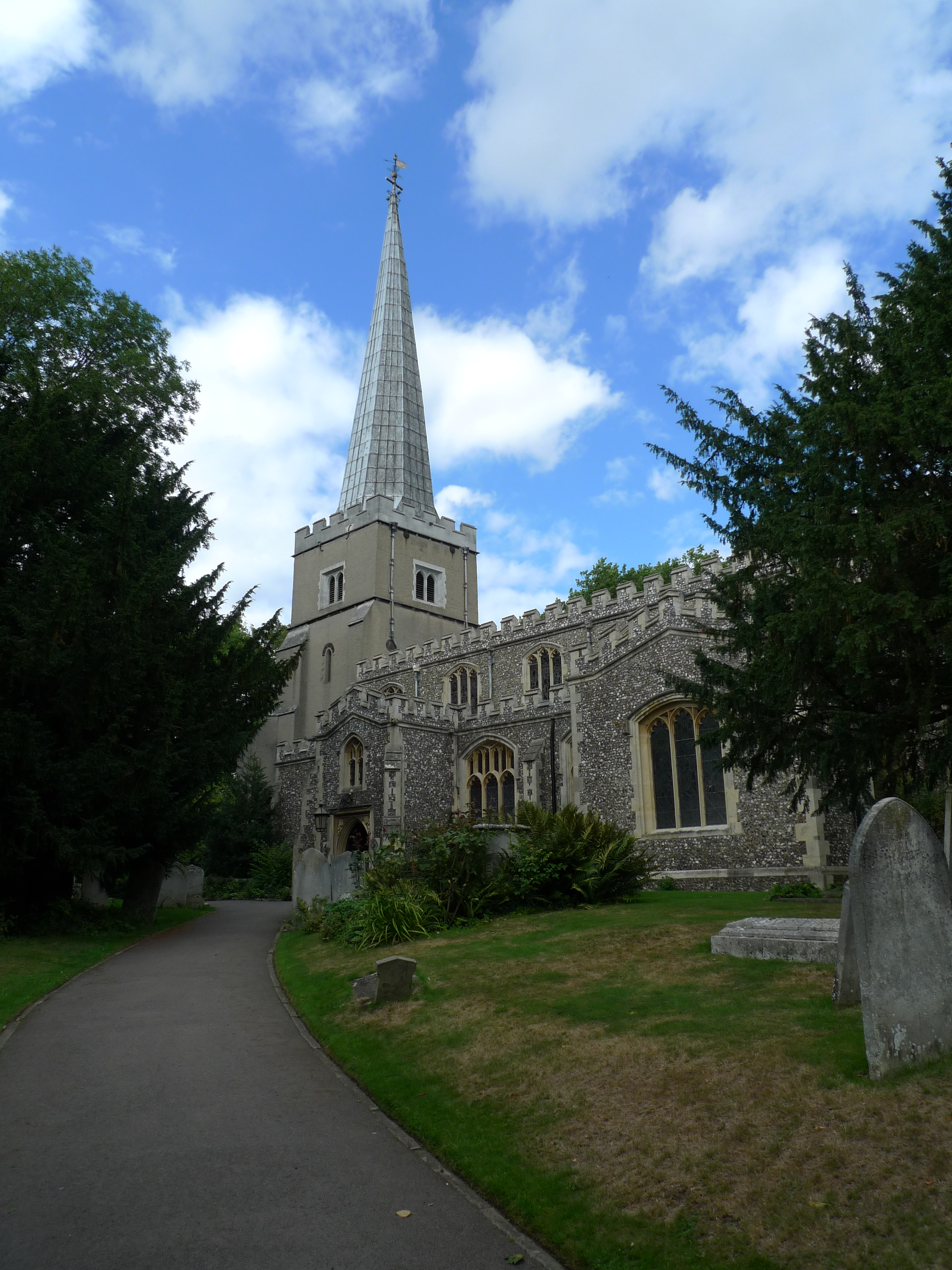
St. Mary's Church
The parish church

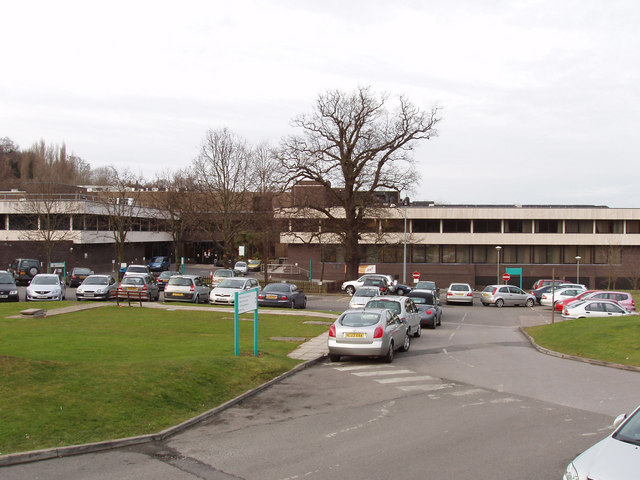
Clementine Churchill Hospital
The local private hospital

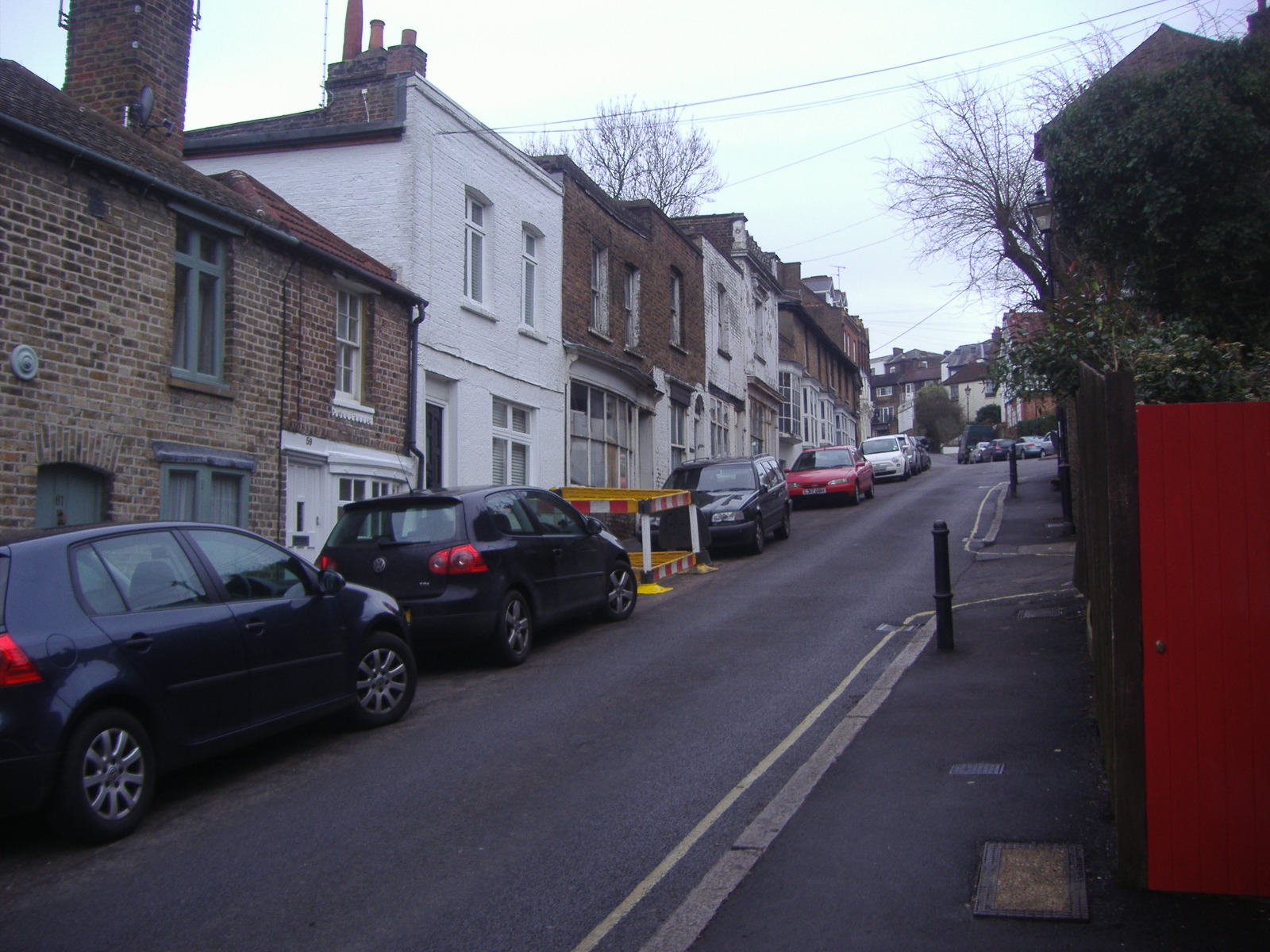
West Street

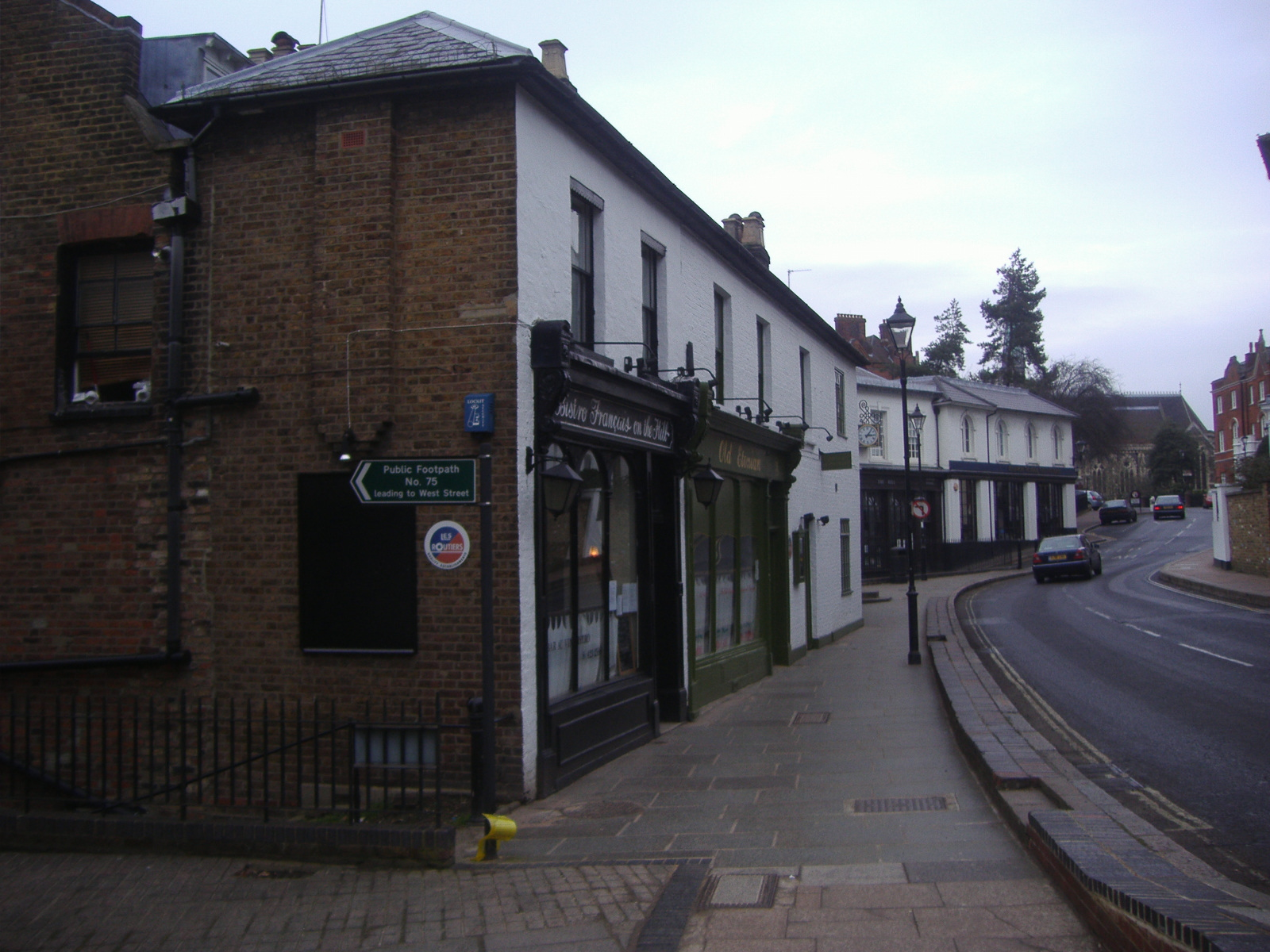
High Street

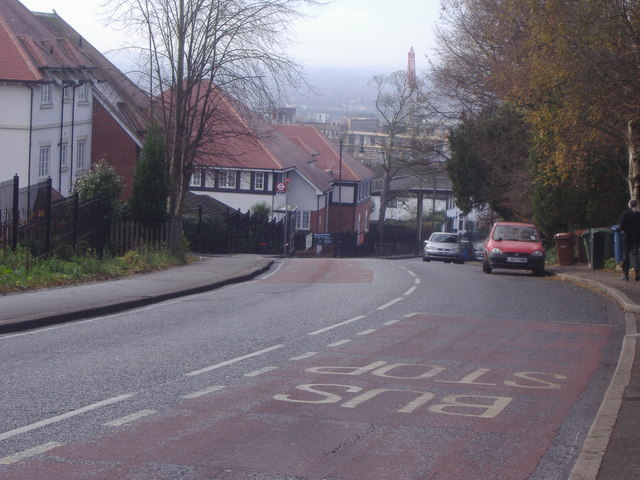
Roxeth Hill

== Religion ==
Harrow on the Hill is also an ecclesiastical parish with St. Mary's, Harrow on the Hill at the apex. It was consecrated by St Anselm in 1094. There is also a Roman Catholic parish church at the foot of the hill, Our Lady and St Thomas of Canterbury, Harrow, dedicated to Our Lady and St Thomas of Canterbury.

Churchfields, Harrow on the Hill, centre of the Harrow Pentagram: Hergae Mound Oak trees leading from the Yew tree grove in Churchfields to the (Leyline-linked) Yew tree grove in St Mary's Church. Hergae Mound is also a direct flight line for pipistrelle bats and barn owls - very active at dusk. The Harrow Pentagram: Centre is St. Mary's at Harrow-on-the-hill. The five points around it are: Belmont Hill Stanmore, Horsenden Hill Greenford, Barn Hill Wembley, Dabbs Hill, St. John's Pinner. Harrow on the Hill's original name 'Gumeninga hergae' suggests that the pagan practises may have still been taking place on the hill – despite increasing conversion to Christianity at the time.

The area has four Catholic schools and three Church of England schools.

== Transport ==
Harrow-on-the-Hill platform sign

Harrow-on-the-Hill station, although named after the settlement, is located some distance to the north of the hill; a few hundred yards from the base of the hill. The London Underground service at Harrow-on-the-Hill is on the Metropolitan line, and the station is also served by the Chiltern Railways London to Aylesbury Line. These services run in to central London, and out west/north west to the outer reaches of London and beyond.

About equidistant to Harrow-on-the-Hill station from the top of the hill, is South Harrow on the Piccadilly line. The 258 and H17 London bus routes run over Harrow on the Hill itself.

== Street accident fatality ==
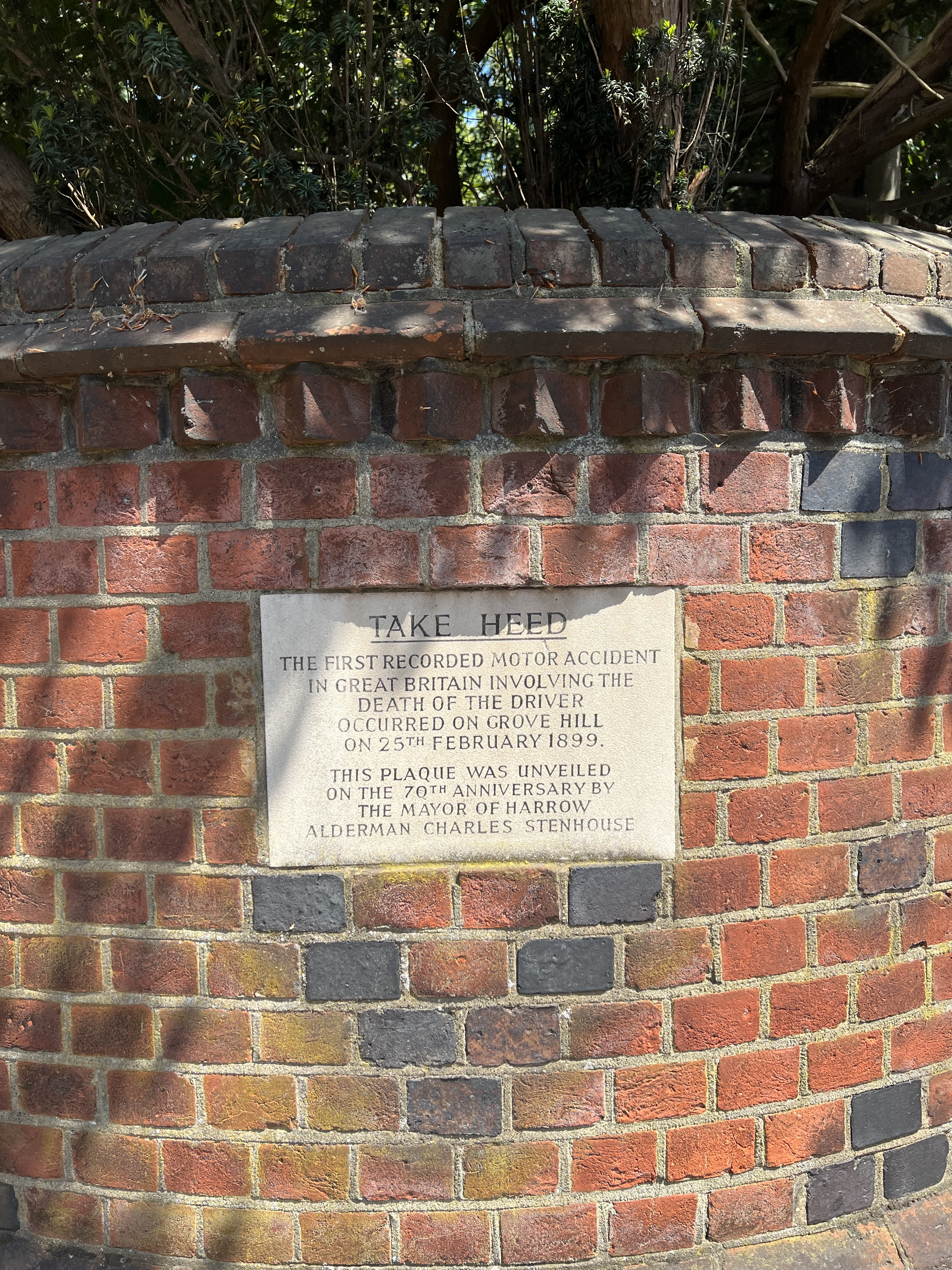

A roadside plaque unveiled on 25 February 1969 states that the first recorded motor accident in Great Britain to have involved the death of the car driver took place at Harrow on the Hill on a road called Grove Hill seventy years earlier, on 25 February 1899. The plaque makes no mention of the name of the dead motorist, but the name of the civic dignitary who unveiled it is given as Alderman Charles Stenhouse, who was Mayor of Harrow at the time.

The driver involved in the crash was 31-year-old engineer Edwin Sewell, driving a 6HP Daimler. A rear wheel collapsed after breaking its rim and the car hit a sturdy brick wall. Sewell was killed immediately when he and his passenger, a Major Richer, were thrown from the vehicle. Richer died three days later in hospital.

== Early railway accident fatality ==
In the graveyard of St Mary's church is a gravestone recording the death of Thomas Port in the railway accident on 7 August 1838.
