= Widmore, London =

Coordinates: 51.4003°N 0.0466°E

Widmore
- Location within Greater London
- OS grid reference: TQ 4142 6904
- London borough: Bromley
- Ceremonial county: Greater London
- Region: London
- Country: England
- Sovereign state: United Kingdom
- Postcode district: BR
- Dialling code: 020
- Police: Metropolitan
- Fire: London
- Ambulance: London
- London Assembly: Bexley and Bromley

Widmore is an area of Greater London, within the London Borough of Bromley. It is located south-east of Sundridge, west of Bickley, north of Bromley Common, and east of Bromley.

== History ==
Widmore derives from 'Withmere', a placename first mentioned in 1226 and thought to mean 'pool where the withy grows'. Wythemere, Widmere and Wigmore were variant spellings.

The area remained a tiny hamlet, save for a brick-works, as late as the 19th century. The pool that gave the area its name was still extant in 1819, however it was later built over; it was located just west of Lewes Road and to the south the Oak pub. The local landowner John Wells sold part of the land lying north of Widmore Road to housing developers in 1845, and by the late 1850s the area contained some 40 large properties, plus a number of smaller cottages. Further building work occurred in this area in 1888. The lands south of Widmore Road were historically part of Bromley Palace, but were built over with further housing in the 1920s-30s. Widmore today has merged completely with the surrounding suburbs and is often seen as part of Bickley.

== Amenities ==
The area contains a small row of shops at Widmore Green (a rather small triangle of grass), at the junction of Widmore Road and Plaistow Lane. There is one pub here (The Oak) and four more located very close to each other along Palace Road/North Road/Freelands Road (The Red Lion, The White Horse, The Anglesey Arms, Freelands Tavern, and the Crown and Anchor).

== Gallery ==
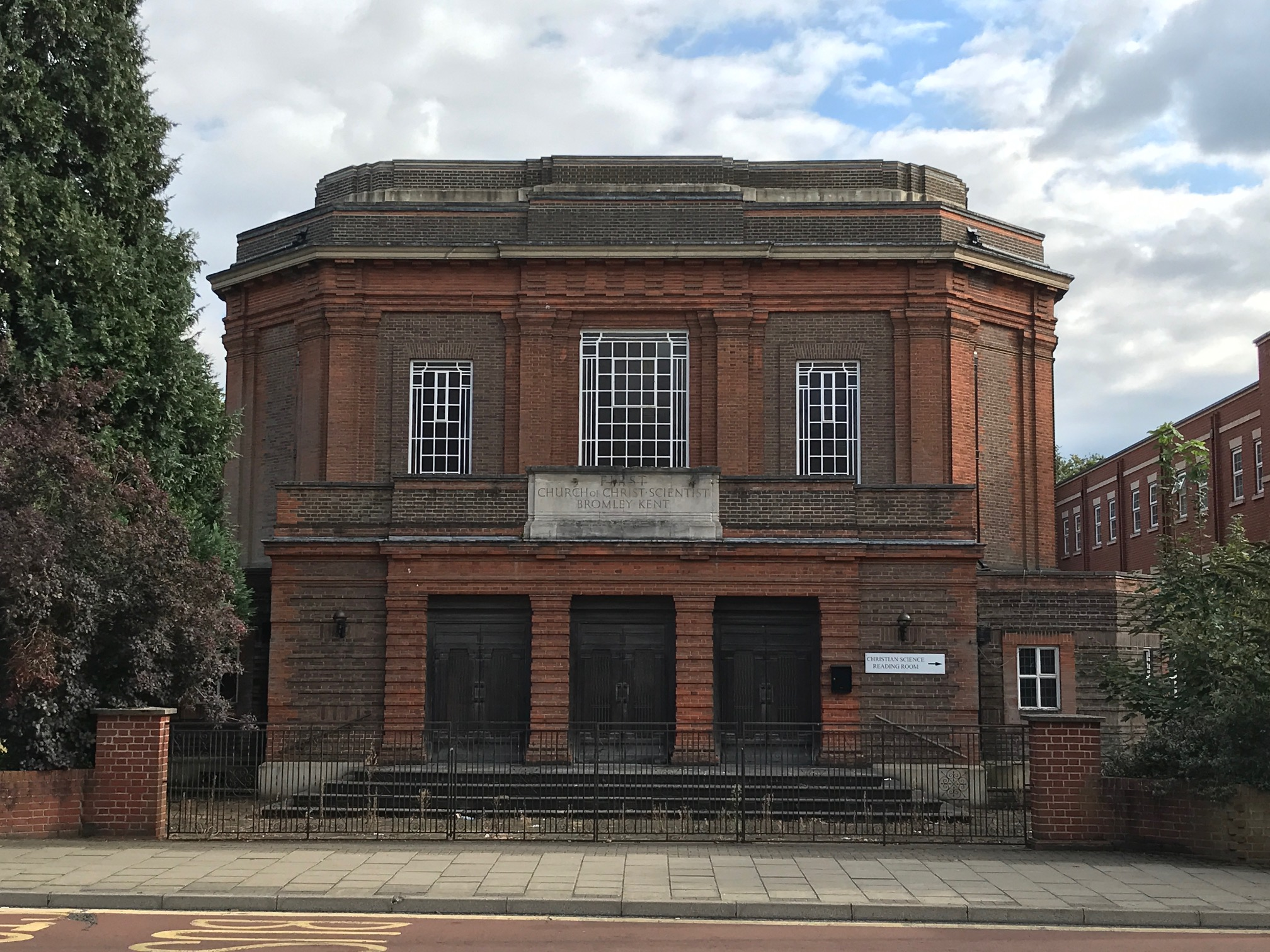
A Christian Science church on Widmore Road, built by W. Braxton Sinclair in 1928 and listed at grade II

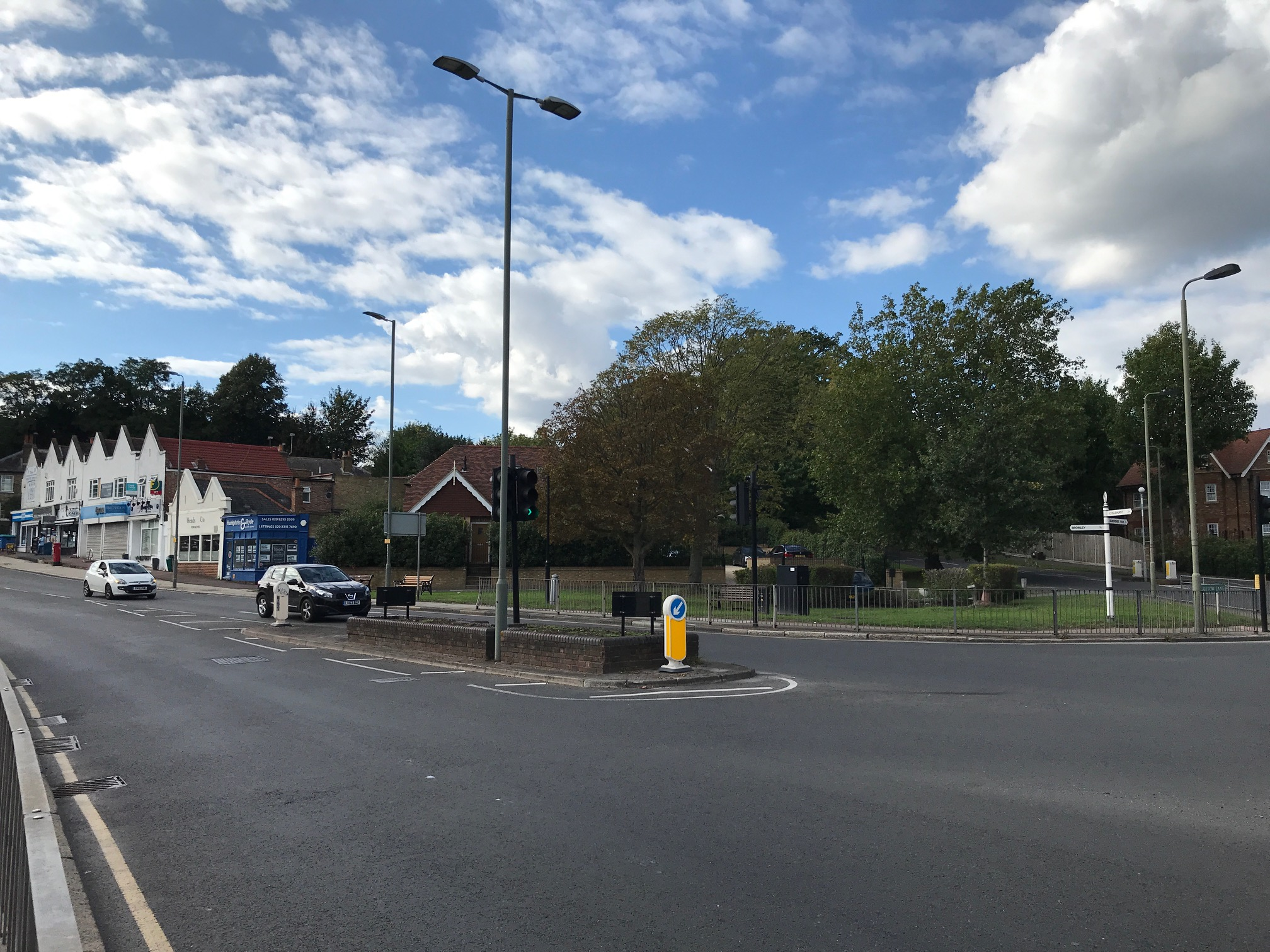
Widmore Green

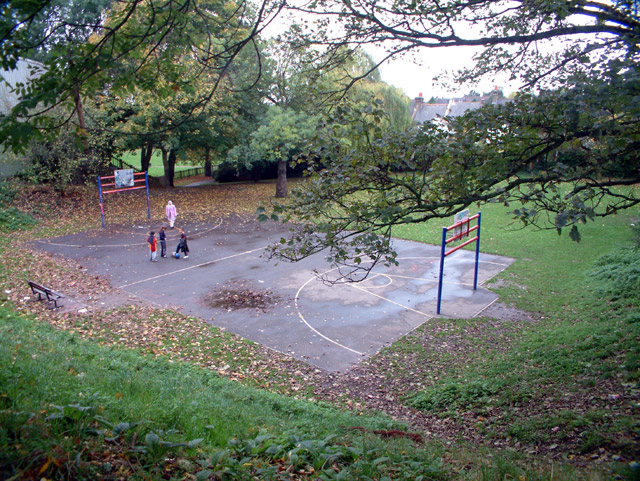
A park in Widmore

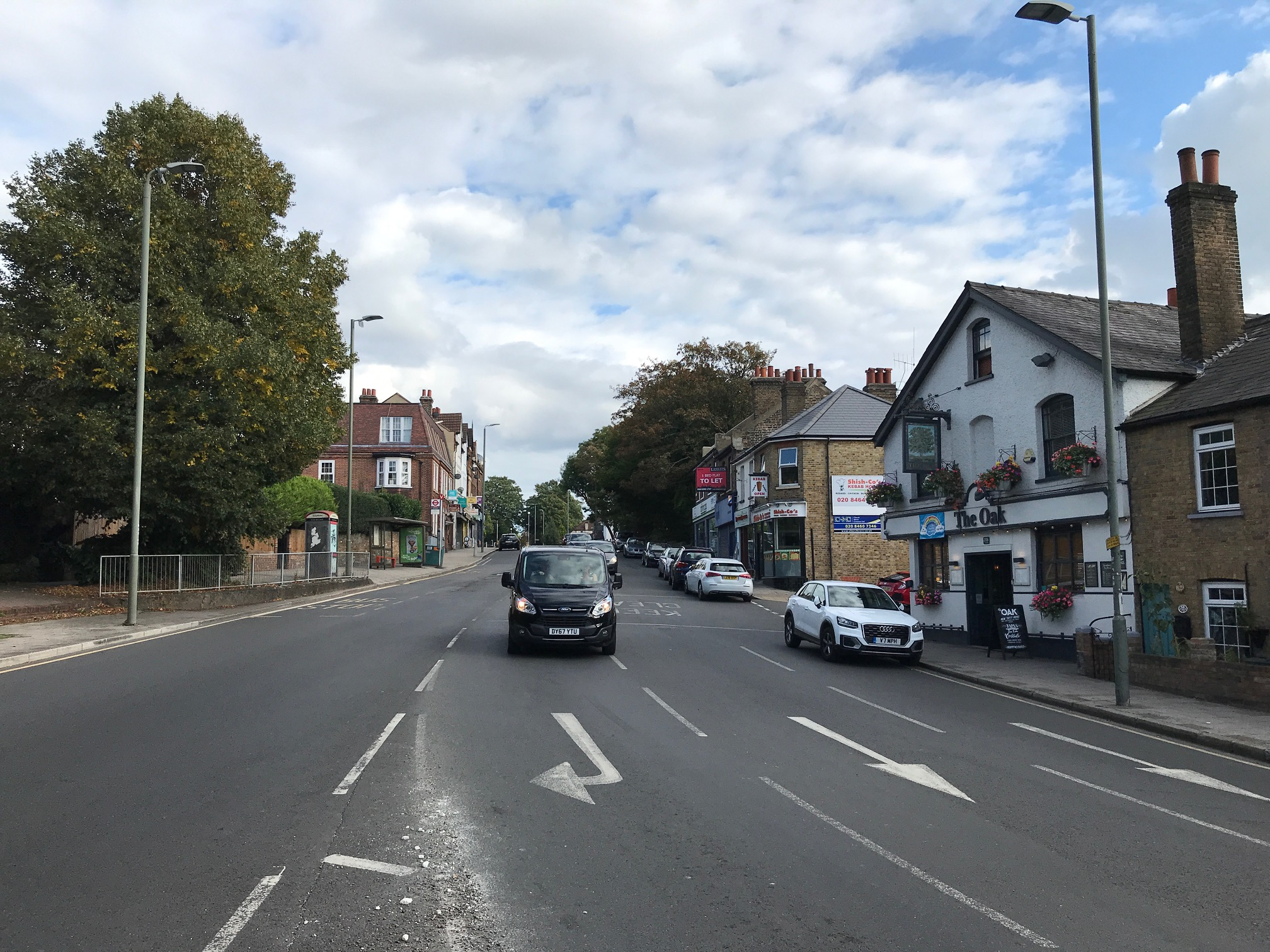
Shops and The Oak pub, Widmore Green

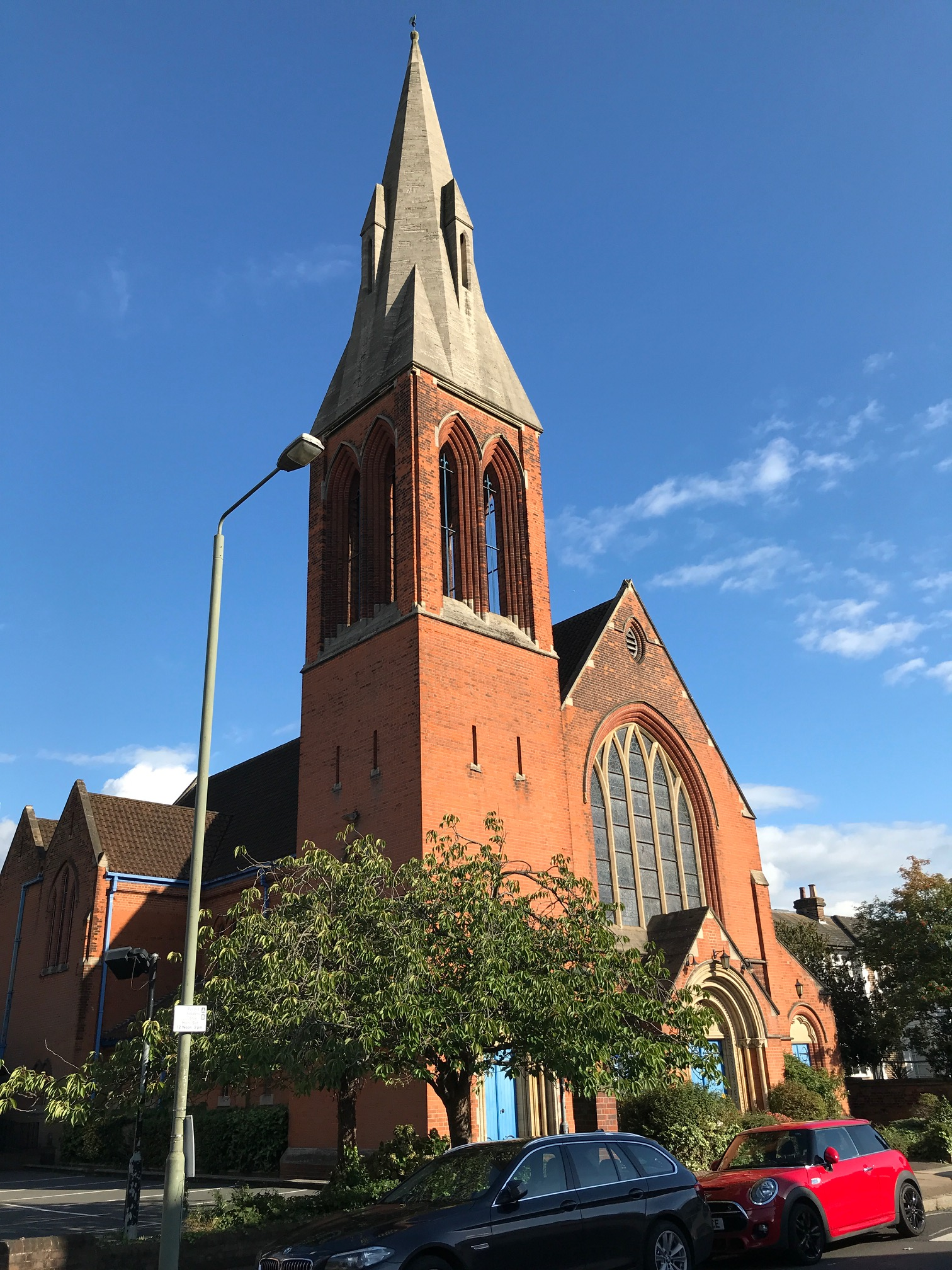
United Reformed Church on Freelands Road, built 1936 on the site of a former Presbyterian church which was struck by lightning and destroyed

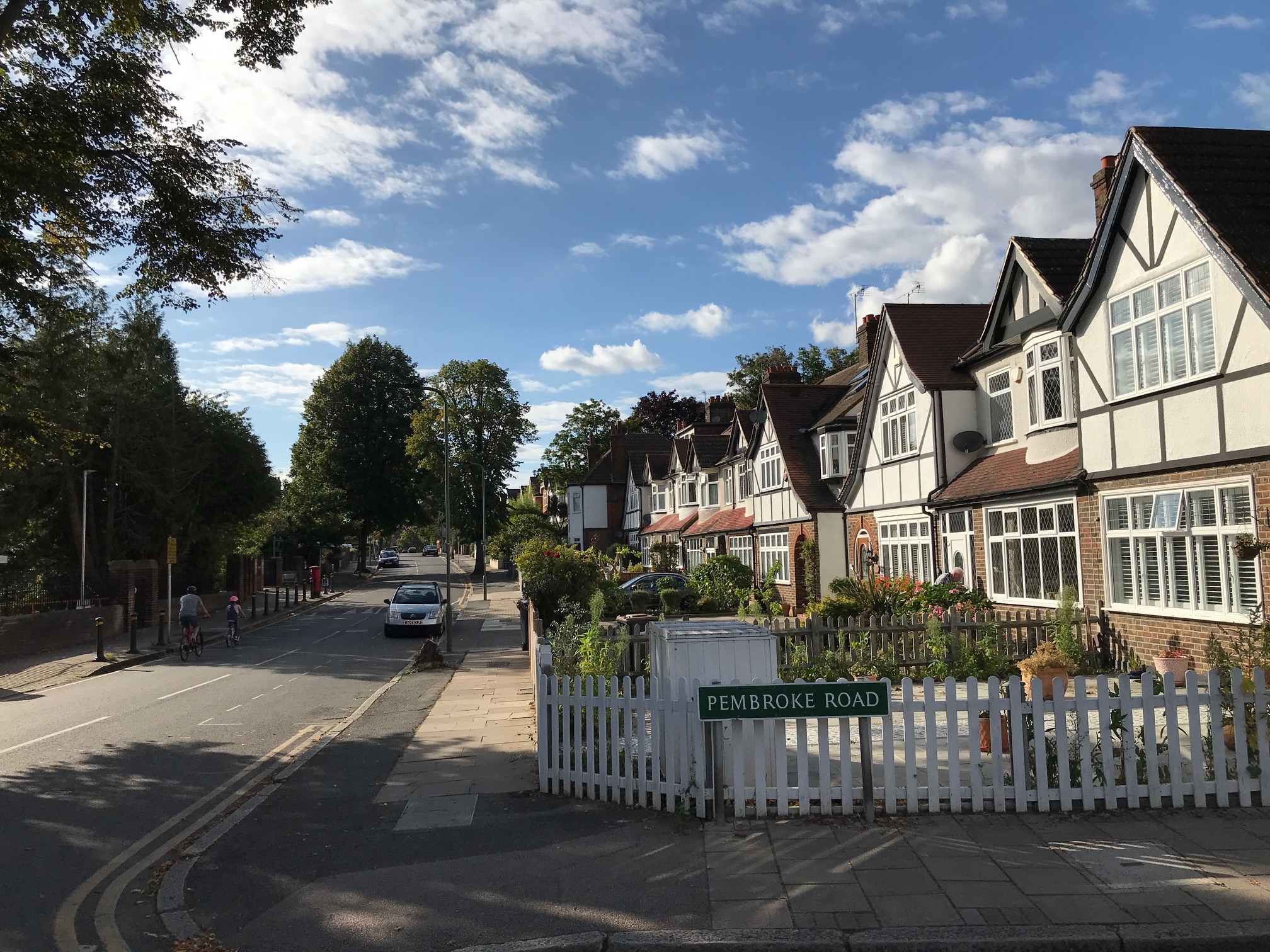
Nightingale Lane, Widmore
