= Rio Cinema =

Rio Cinema may refer to:

- Rio Cinema (Burnham on Crouch)
- Rio Cinema (Dalston)
