= The K. R. Cama Oriental Institute =

Non Profit Organization

- Formation: 18 December 1916
- Type: Non-profit organization
- Headquarters: 136, K.R.Cama Institute Building, Bombay Samachar Marg, Fort, Mumbai
- Location: Mumbai, Maharashtra, India
- Region served: India
- Fields: Education, Seminars, Library
- President: Homa B. Petit

The K. R. Cama Oriental Institute is a research institute that promotes the study of Oriental religions, history and culture with a focus on Zoroastrianism. The institute is situated in Mumbai, India and was established in 1916 though public subscription in order to honour the memory of renowned Oriental scholar and linguist Kharshedji Rustomji Cama. The institute conducts periodic lectures, publishes books, gives awards and organizes an annual international congress on Oriental studies.

== History ==
In 1896, Zoroastrian scholar and theosophist Jivanji Jamshedji Modi wrote a letter to the eminent British archaeologist W. M. Flinders Petrie of University College, London on behalf of the Bombay Parsi Panchayet soliciting his advice in conducting archaeological research to understand the origins and history of the Zoroastrian religion and had the letter delivered through the theosophist Henry Steel Olcott. Flinders-Petrie gave an encouraging reply even suggesting the name of the linguist and Oriental scholar Edward Denison Ross as a suitable candidate to lead an archaeological expedition. However, the suggestion was not considered at that time and was eventually forgotten.

In 1909, the eminent Parsi scholar and originator of the Zoroastrian Fasli calendar, Kharshedji Rustomji Cama died leaving behind a vast collection of books, manuscripts and historical material. During the last years of his life, Cama had a desire to build a hall atop the Dadisett Agiary in Bombay where a research institute could operate from. A gathering of Parsi and Hindu businessmen, educationists and scholars of Wilson College met and set up The K. R. Cama Oriental Institute in 1916, seven years after his death to honour his memory. The institute was inaugurated on 18 December 1916 by Lord Willingdon, the then Governor of Bombay at the Sukhadwala building in Hornby Street where it was housed till 1936 when it moved to its own premises, at 136 Apollo Street, Fort, Bombay. The late K. R. Cama's personal collection of books formed the core of the institute's library.

== Activities ==
The institute hosts government research fellowship lectures and conducts courses on world religions. The institute also organises an annual international congress and publishes the proceedings in the official journal. Annual Avabai B. Wadia Endowment lectures, Dinshah J. Irani memorial lectures and national seminars on Persian topics are held at the institute. The institute also preserves ancient manuscripts and publishes out-of-print works of significance out of the Zarthosty Brothers Fund. Interschool and intercollege seminars are held regularly under the Golestan Bilimoria Endowment.

== See also ==
- The Asiatic Society of Mumbai
- F. D. Alpaiwalla Museum
