= Women in the Parsi community =

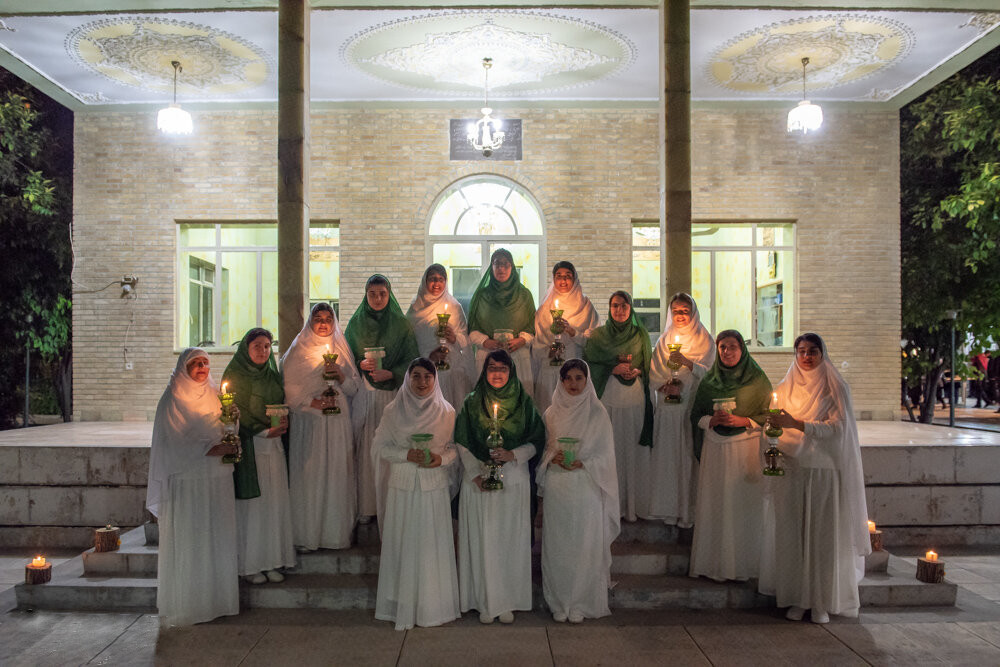
Women participating in a Sadeh Festival in Shiraz, Iran

The role of women in the Zoroastrian and Parsi communities remains controversial and significant. Gender roles in the community have slowly been evolving as societal norms around them progress.

== Formal rights for women ==
Formal institutions, such as laws and courts, have led women within this community to find themselves both at the center of a tradition and compromised by it.

=== Role of trusts ===
Within the Parsi community, religious spaces are managed and funded by charitable trusts. It is through this mechanism that Parsi women's rights in such religious spaces are determined within the Parsi community in India.

=== Parsi personal law ===
Personal laws are those that apply only to a certain community, class, or group of people within India, often with reference to one's religion, faith, and caste. Such Personal Laws vary according to religion and as such there are Personal Laws for the Hindu, Muslim, Christian, and Parsi communities.

The Parsi Personal Laws are dictated by the Parsi Marriage and Divorce Act of 1936. The act was written and adopted on April 23, 1936, and later amended in 2001. Parsi Personal Laws only address marriage between two Parsis of the opposite sex. The main purpose of the Personal Laws are to outlaw child marriage, incest, and polygamy.

The most notable articles within the act include Article 6 that requires for every marriage under the act to be registered. Article 32B dictates that divorce must be filed by both husband and wife on the ground of both parties living separately for a year or more, an inability to live together, and the mutual agreement of separation. Article 34 furthers this with the protocol that any married person can sue for a judicial separation on the same conditions that a divorce might be filed.

The Parsi Personal Laws function in accordance with the Special Marriage Act of 1954. This act states that it is compulsory for all marriages to be registered, regardless of the religious identity of the individuals involved. The two acts, while functioning together, are often at odds with one another with relation to intermarriage, and the validity of such marriages.

=== Inheritance law ===
Parsi Laws of Inheritance dictate that any non-Parsi woman who is the wife, or widow, of a Parsi man cannot receive inheritance from their husbands. However, the children of such a couple, born to a non-Parsi mother and a Parsi father, are entitled to the inheritance of their fathers.

=== Intermarriage rights ===
Intermarriage is the term used to refer to married couples that are of different religious faiths. More and more Parsis are marrying outside the community. Parsi woman marrying a non-parsi is allowed to enter the fire temple and participate in religious activities.

Before December 2017, a Parsi woman who marries a non-Parsi man was automatically considered to have converted to the religion of her husband. She was forced to renunciate her identity as a Parsi. She no longer had access to the legal protections and religious spaces that are governed by the Parsi trusts. This included places of worship, known as Agyaris or fire temples, and sacred burial sites. On December 14, 2017, Supreme court overruled the verdict of High Court of Gujarat which stated the denial of parsi woman to enter fire temple is illegal. A parsi woman marrying a non-parsi is now allowed to enter the fire temple and tower of silence and participate in other religious activities. The children of an intermarriage can only be recognized as Parsi if their father is a Parsi and their mother is a non-Parsi. In the case that their father is a non-Parsi and their mother is a Parsi, they are not allowed to identify as Parsi nor be raised as such. Such children are, like their Parsi mothers post-marriage to a non-Parsi man, unable to enter the Agyaris nor be accepted into the faith group through the ritual, the Navjote.

=== Notable court cases ===
There have been a series of judicial cases concerning women's rights within the Parsi community that have been escalated to the High Courts of India. Such cases have brought legal, media, and popular attention to progression towards greater rights for Parsi women.

One such case is that of a Parsi women, Goolrukh Gupta, who married a Hindu man and was subsequently barred from entering all Parsi sacred spaces as an intermarried women. Gupta sued the local Parsi trust in her town of Valsad, Gujarat that imposed the restriction on her. Her case was soon escalated to the Gujarat High Court. Gupta made the case that she was married under the Special Marriage Act of 1956 and thus her civil marriage should be recognized in all communities. However, the High Court ruled in favor of the trust and Gupta remained a Hindu, and not a Parsi, in the eyes of the trust and legal system.

A second famous case is the Parsi Punchayet Case of 1909. In this case, Sir Dinshaw Petit sued the Bombay Parsi Panchayet (BPP). His case was that the funds from the BPP trust were being restricted from Parsi converts, as people who could also benefit from the offerings of the trust. In this case, Ratanji D. Tata and his wife, a born French woman, were both plaintiffs. Mrs. Tata had converted to the Parsi religion, and yet as a convert, the BPP barred her from entering any agiarys and disabled her from being buried in the sacred site, the Tower of Silence or the doongerwadi. Again, the High Court ruled in favor of the trust.

In a third case, in December 2017, the Supreme Court of India ruled in favor of women's rights. Despite both being married to non-Parsi men, two Parsi sisters were granted the right to attend their father's burial at the Tower of Silence. In this case, the Court ruled against the Mumbai Parsi trust that was banning both the women. The Court however, could not secure the right of the women to pray.

== Informal rights for women ==
Ritualized Spaces and traditions also influence the rights and role of women in the Zoroastrian community, in a more informal, yet pervasive, manner.

=== Ritual spaces ===
In addition to legal restrictions, women in the Parsi community face restrictions in ritualized, religious spaces as well. One of the most notable examples of this is that women are often not allowed into the doongerwadi and other sacred burial grounds for Parsis throughout India.

=== Community spaces ===
Parsi women also face discrimination in community spaces, such as social clubs. Many such clubs in Mumbai have adopted the British idea of a "gentleman's club" by only granting membership to males. One prominent example of this is the Ripon Club. Following backlash from the community, the Ripon Club began granting membership to females. Approximately 10% of their members are female, all of whom are considered to be "lady associate members". Such members must attain their membership either through a Parsi father or a Parsi husband who is a member. They do not have voting rights within the club.

== In religious scripture ==
The rights of women within the Parsi faith can be analyzed through scriptures and ancient Zoroastrian texts, such as the Avesta. However, the scriptures can be analyzed and perceived in many different ways.

The result is two main camps of text interpreters - a liberal camp and an orthodox camp. Those who read the text with a liberal perspective state that the Parsi prophet, Zarathustra, has always addressed both men and women through his words and actions. The orthodox view states that no one who is half Parsi, whether male or female, born to a Parsi mother or father, should be considered to be a Parsi at all. These people believe that laws and access, even those that allow children born to Parsi fathers and non-Parsi mothers, should only be made more strict and restrictive.
