= Jimmy Mistry =

Indian Hotelier

- Born: Ahmedabad, Gujarat
- Occupations: Interior designer, hotelier, and businessman
- Website: jimmymistry.com

Jimmy Mistry is an Indian entrepreneur and designer. He is the founder of Della Group.

== Career ==
=== Early ventures ===
Mistry began his business career in pest control before moving into interior contracting and furniture manufacturing. A 2023 profile in Mint Lounge traced his early business activities to a pest-control venture. He expanded the business into interior contracting in 1993 and modular office furniture in 1995, followed by the establishment of a furniture manufacturing facility in Daman in 1997.

One of the projects associated with his design work was Della Tower, a 21-storey building whose design drew on Persian architectural elements and Zoroastrian imagery.

=== Hospitality and adventure tourism ===
In 2009 Della Group expanded into hospitality with the development of Della Resort in Lonavala.

In October 2010, Business Standard reported the launch of Della Adventure, a recreation park in Lonavala developed by Della Tecnica Group.

Mistry is also the founder of Della Adventure Training Academy (D.A.T.A.), a military-themed glamping resort in Lonavala.

=== Della Leaders Club ===
In June 2021, Mistry launched Della Leaders Club (DLC), a business platform intended to bring entrepreneurs and business leaders together.

=== Real estate development ===
Della Group later expanded into integrated township development through Della Townships. In May 2025, Business Standard reported that Della Resorts had entered into a partnership with Hiranandani Communities and Krisala Developers for a proposed 40-acre, racecourse-themed development in North Hinjewadi, Pune. The report identified Mistry as founder and chairman of Della Resorts and Adventure.

In May 2026, Mistry’s company stated its pipeline of 12 projects covering 4,288 acres, with a gross development value of ₹46,480 crore. These figures represented the company's reported development pipeline rather than completed sales or realised revenue.

== Community involvement ==
In August 2019, Mistry was among former trustees of the Bombay Parsi Punchayet appointed to a consultative committee formed to consider issues facing the Parsi community.
