= Zoroastrian Trust Funds of Europe =

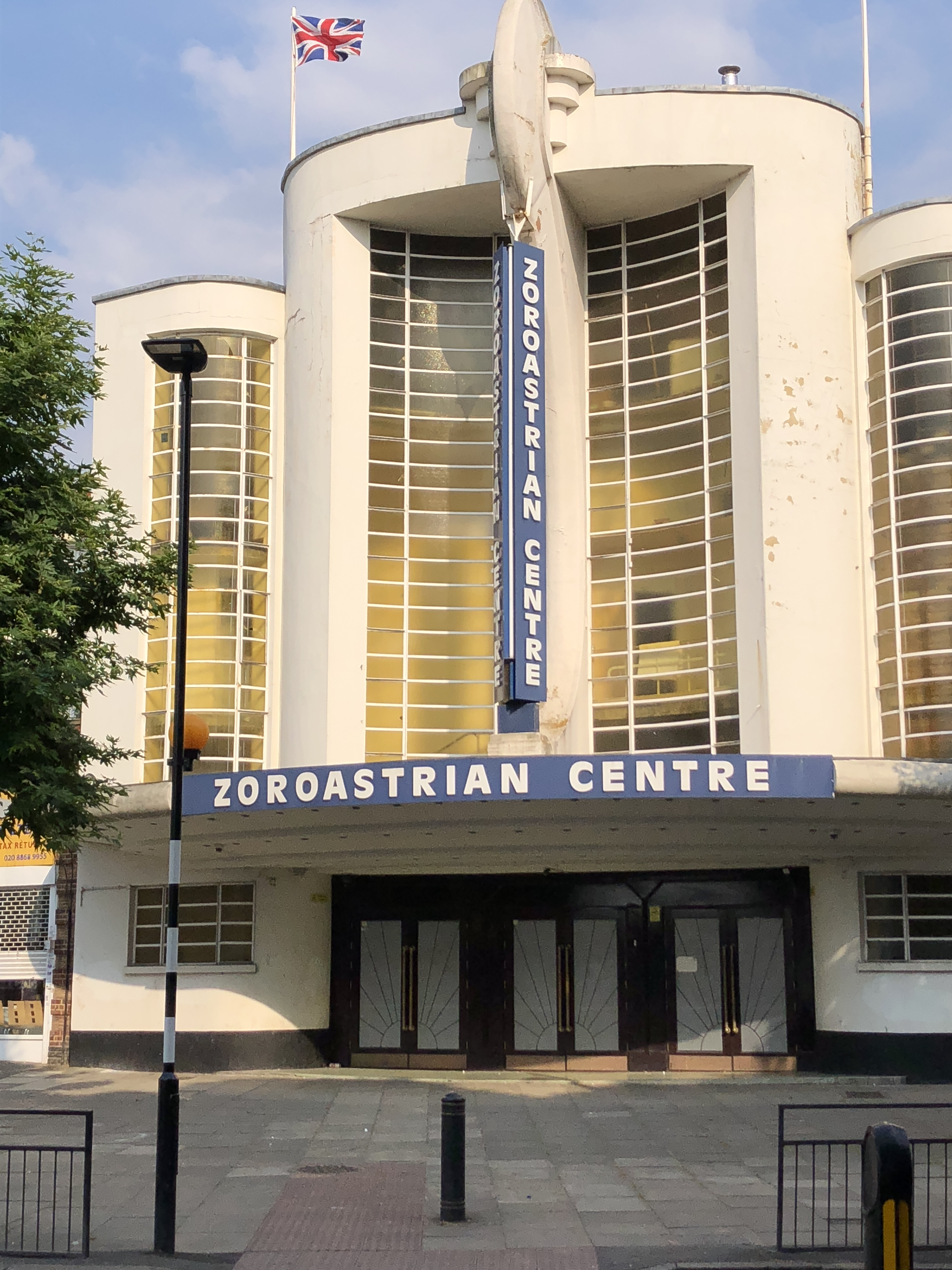
- The Zoroastrian Centre in London
- Abbreviation: ZTFE
- Formation: 1861
- Founders: Muncherjee Hormusji Cama and Dadabhai Naoroji
- Registration no.: 277185
- Headquarters: The Zoroastrian Centre, 440 Alexandra Ave, London
- Region served: Europe 51°34′26.74″N 0°22′14.98″W
- Website: The Zoroastrian Trust Funds of Europe official website

The Zoroastrian Trust Funds of Europe (ZTFE) is a religious, cultural and social organisation for Zoroastrians residing in Europe, particularly the United Kingdom. It was founded on 31 October 1861 by Muncherjee Hormusji Cama and Dadabhai Naoroji.

At the time of its founding, it was reported that there were approximately fifty Zoroastrians present in England who were mainly students. However, Zoroastrians have been present in the United Kingdom long before the foundation of the ZTFE; the first known Parsi arrival being Nowroji Rustom Maneck Sett (Nowroji Rustomji) in 1721 or 1724. Currently, there are around 5,000 members of the ZTFE.

The secretariat and principal venue attached to the organisation is Zoroastrian Centre located in the Rayners Lane area of Harrow. The centre is the Grade II* listed Art Deco former Ace Cinema.

Additionally, the ZTFE manage the "Parsee burial ground" established in 1862, at Brookwood Cemetery which is the only operating Zoroastrian burial ground in Europe.

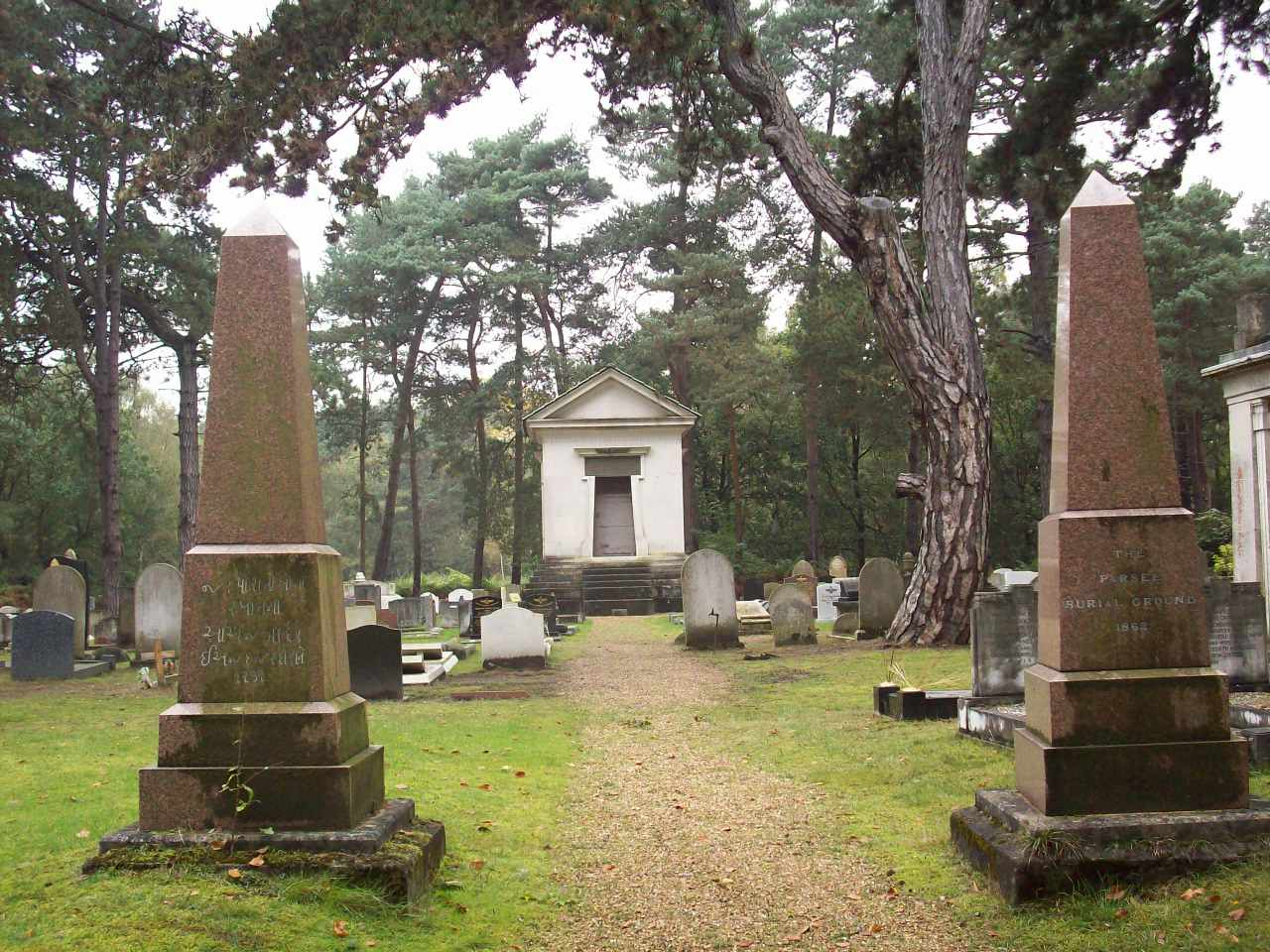
Zoroastrian graves at Brookwood Cemetery

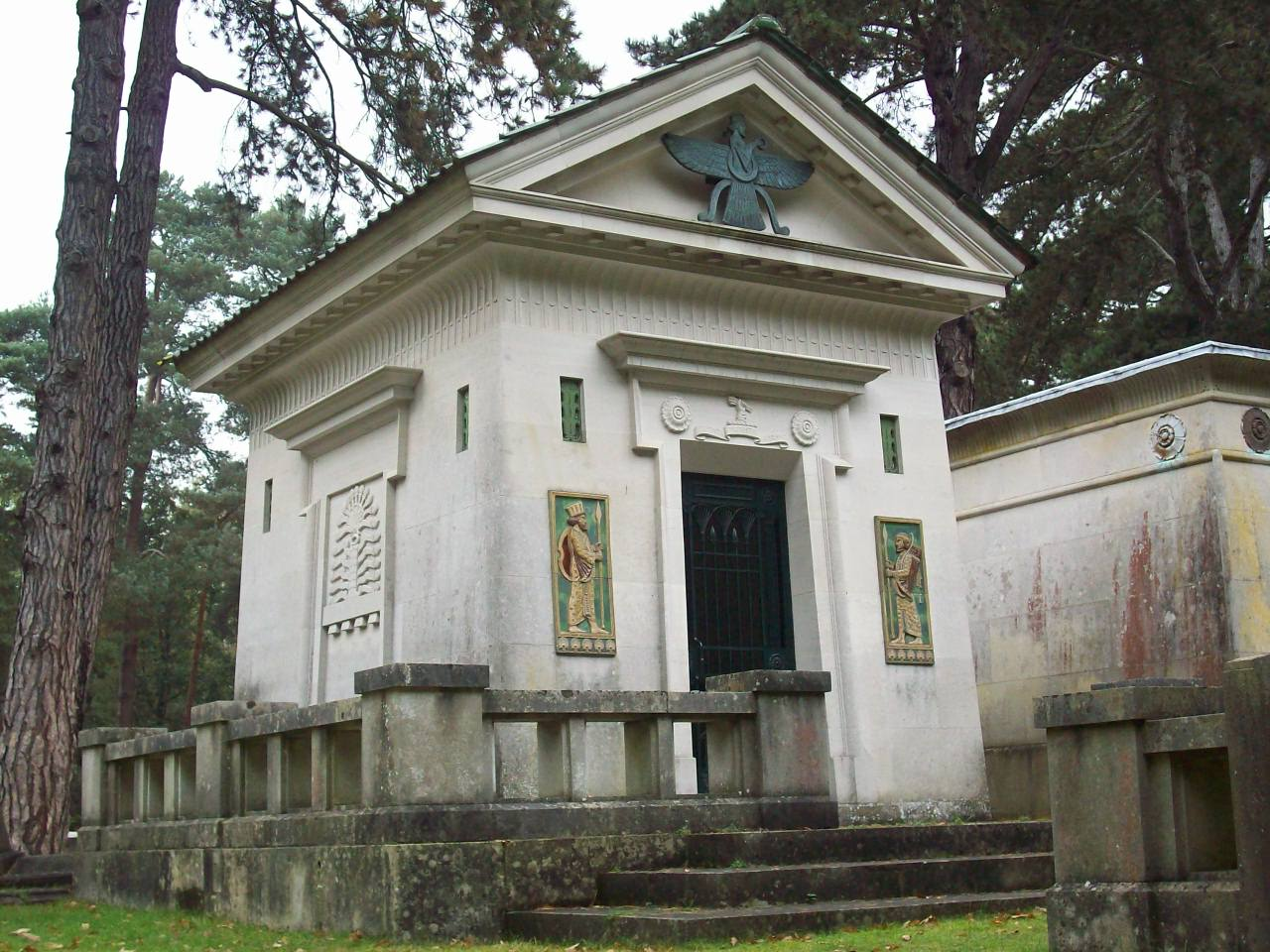
Zoroastrian building at Brookwood Cemetery

Notable visitors to The Zoroastrian Centre in recent years include: Prince Philip, Duke of Edinburgh; Dr. Rowan Williams; the Archbishop of Canterbury; Prince Edward, Earl of Wessex; and Sophie, Countess of Wessex.

== History ==
The first formal move to organise the growing Parsi community in the United Kingdom was from Muncherjee Cama, who was joined by Dadabhai Naoroji in a circular letter to the fifty Parsis they knew to be in London in 1861. The Zoroastrian Trust Funds of Europe was initially founded as Europena Zarthost Dharmanu Khatu (The Religious Funds of the Zoroastrians in Europe in Gujarati), in Kensington, London; the first meeting was attended by fifteen Parsis at Cama's residence at 24 Devonshire Terrace.

The Religious Funds of the Zoroastrians of Europe existed to purchase land for the burial of the dead; to help stranded or destitute Zoroastrians; to purchase and produce books on Zoroastrianism; to fund research on Zoroastrianism; to establish a 'House of Prayer'; and as a general fund for miscellaneous expenses. Under its regulations four of the seven managing trustees were to be students, with other members representing the association at the University of Oxford, University of Cambridge and University of Edinburgh.

Whilst the association initially consisted of Parsis only, they were active in campaigning for the rights of the persecuted Zoroastrians in Iran. Dadabhai Naoroji and Mancherjee Bhownagree, both presidents of the ZTFE and MPs, addressed the House of Commons on this issue. On the six occasions Shah Naser al-Din Shah Qajar visited London, Parsi delegations from the ZTFE were present to advocate for their Iranian co-religionists suffering intense persecution under the Qajar dynasty.

== See also ==
- The Bombay Parsi Punchayet
- The Federation of Zoroastrian Associations of North America
