= Rayners Lane =

Road and area in London

Coordinates: 51.5737°N 0.3735°W

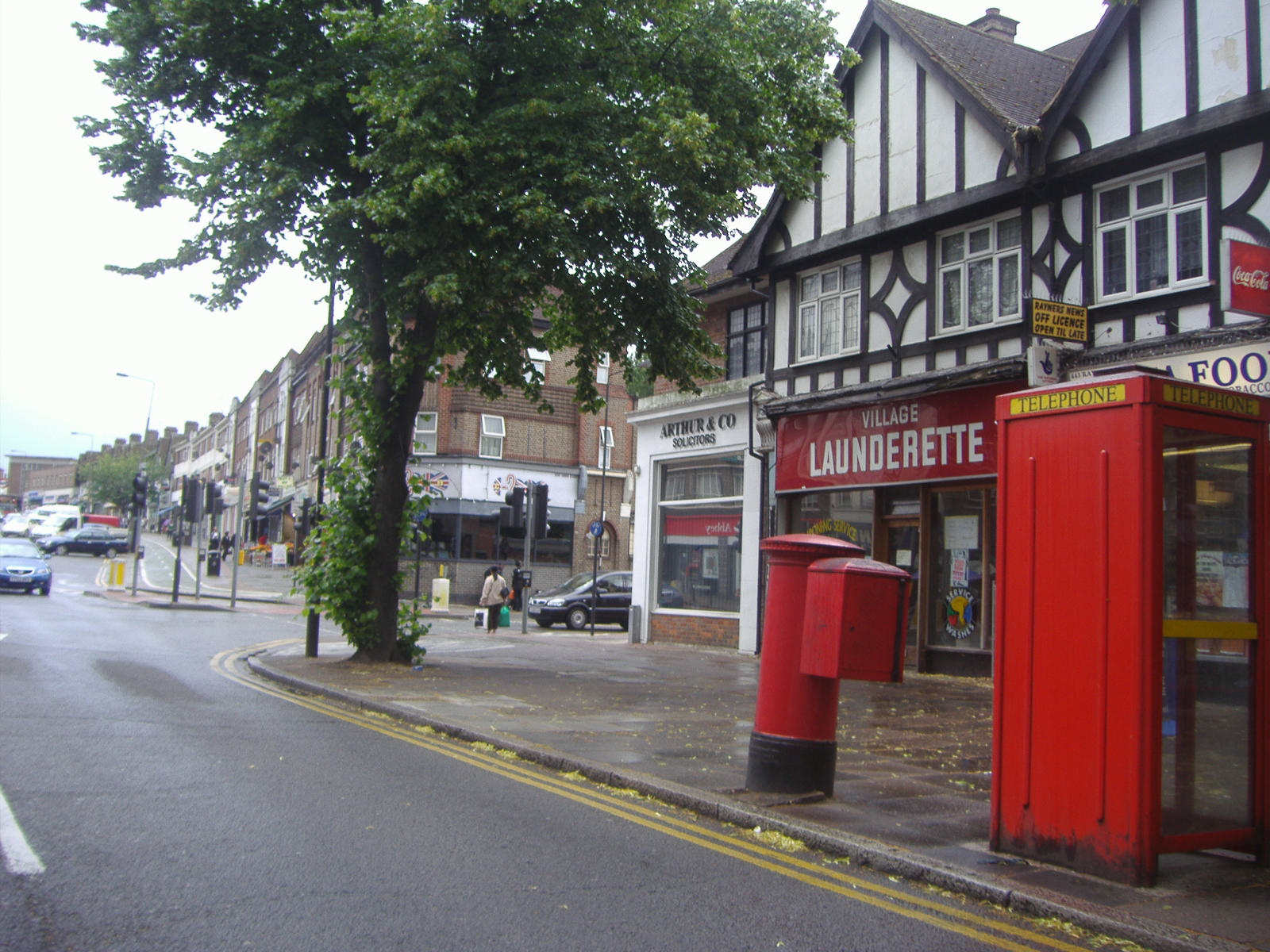
- Shops on the junction of Rayners Lane and Village Way

- Location within Greater London
- Population: 9,143 (2021, ward)
- OS grid reference: TQ128873
- London borough: Harrow
- Ceremonial county: Greater London
- Region: London
- Country: England
- Sovereign state: United Kingdom
- Post town: Harrow
- Postcode district: HA2
- Post town: Pinner
- Postcode district: HA5
- Dialling code: 020
- Police: Metropolitan
- Fire: London
- Ambulance: London
- UK Parliament: Harrow West
- London Assembly: Brent and Harrow

Rayners Lane is a suburban district in the London Borough of Harrow that forms the western part of Harrow in northwest London. Located between Pinner and West Harrow, it takes its name from a road in the area, also called Rayners Lane (formerly also spelt Rayner's Lane) which runs from Marsh Road in Pinner to Eastcote Lane in South Harrow.

== History ==
The first documented use of Rayner as a place name in Pinner was from 1856 when two fields, Upper Rayners Field and Lower Rayners Field, were mentioned in a conveyance. These were named after the Rayner family, who moved from Ruislip to Pinner at the start of the 19th century. It is assumed the Rayners Lane roadway was given that name sometime before the Rayner family left the area in the 1870s. The roadway was often called Bourne Lane, because it crossed several streams, including the Yeading Brook. During the medieval period, it functioned as a nameless service road linking Pinner and Roxeth. It was used to transport grain to the mill on Pinner Green.

The Metropolitan Railway was extended to Uxbridge from Harrow on the Hill in 1904, passing across Rayners Lane. A halt was built at Rayners Lane, opening in 1906. Despite this, the area remained rural, with a single farmstead north of the halt.

The area saw wide-ranging development in the 1930s. The developments were part of the Metropolitan Railway's plans to bring customers to its railway by developing the surrounding countryside – an area marketed as Metro-land.

The first development in Rayners Lane was in 1927 when Metropolitan Railway Country Estates Ltd. purchased land north of the station. The development, named Harrow Garden Village, was built by E.S. Reid and was laid out on garden suburb principles.

Further developments followed after Tithe Farm south of the Piccadilly Line was sold to T.F. Nash Ltd. in about 1930. This was the widest-scale development in the Pinner area and consisted of cheap, mostly terraced housing. Nash excelled at advertising the estate, and in 1933 he constructed a temporary 35-foot illuminated wooden arch across Alexandra Avenue as part of an advertising promotion.

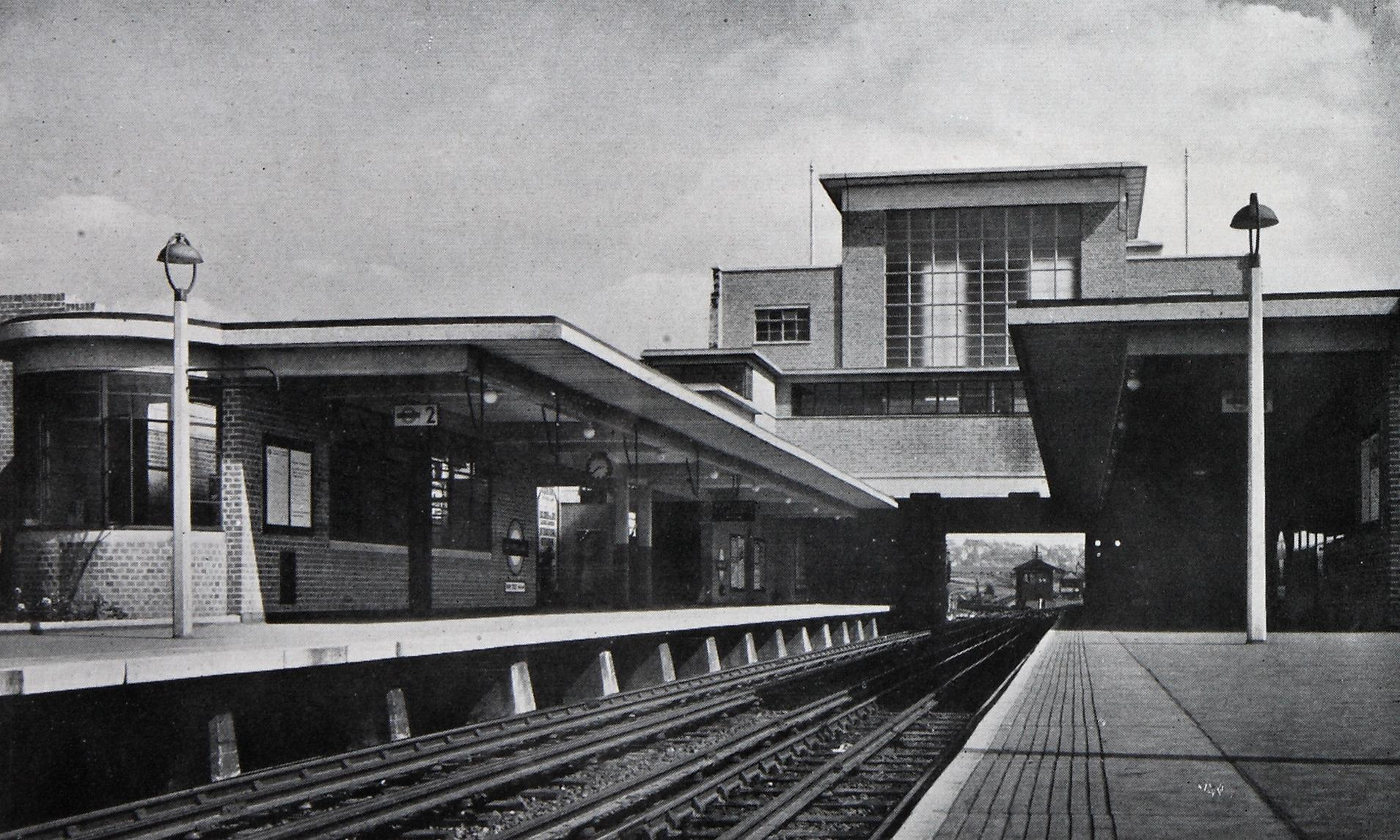
Rayners Lane Station c. 1946

Other developers were also active in the area. H.J. Mark was a prolific architect who designed many buildings on the Alexandra Avenue shopping parade. Charles Holden and Reginald Uren redesigned the station which was completed in 1938 and served the Metropolitan and Piccadilly tube lines.

In October 2002, Rayners Lane Conservation Area was designated by Harrow Council. This covers the area around the station and the shopping parades on Alexandra Avenue. The designation aims to protect the character of the area and identify opportunities to preserve and improve it.

By May 2016, the Rayners Lane Estate had been rebuilt, rehousing more than 400 existing tenants into new homes.

== Governance ==
Boundaries of the Rayners Lane ward within the London Borough of Harrow since 2022

Rayners Lane lies within the London Borough of Harrow, governed under the local authority of Harrow London Borough Council. The Rayners Lane ward was established in The London Borough of Harrow (Electoral Arrangements) Order 1978, comprising areas that were previously part of the Pinner South and Roxbourne wards. The first elections in the ward were held in May 1978, in which three Conservative councillors were elected.

Ward boundaries were revised in 2000 and most recently in 2020, taking effect in the 2022 council elections. As a result of the 2020 changes, the Rayners Lane ward lost the Harrow Garden Village area north of the station to the Pinner South ward. It also had its total number of councillors reduced from three to two. In 2022, Krishna Suresh (Labour) and Thaya Idaikkadar (Conservative) were elected as councillors to represent the ward, while the Conservative Party took control of the council. Both councillors were re-elected in 2026.

Rayners Lane is in the Brent and Harrow constituency for the London Assembly, which has been represented since 2021 by Krupesh Hirani (Labour). It is also in the Harrow West parliamentary constituency, which has been represented since 1997 by Gareth Thomas (Labour). The Pinner South ward is part of the Ruislip, Northwood and Pinner parliamentary constituency, represented since 2019 by David Simmonds (Conservative).

Borough Election – Rayners Lane ward (2022)
Party	Candidate	Votes	%	±%
Labour	Krishna Suresh	1,399	44.1	+1.2
Conservative	Thaya Idaikkadar	977	30.8	+1.9
Labour	Tarza Ahmed Sharif	962	30.3	−8.6
Conservative	Mala Morjaria	886	27.9	+0.0
Liberal Democrats	Chris Noyce	665	20.9	−15.9
Independent	Sockalingam Yogalingam	559	17.6	N/A
Liberal Democrats	Gerri Noyce	426	13.4	−14.7
Green	Rowan Nicholas Charles Langley	182	5.7	N/A
Independent	Herbie Crossman	166	5.2	N/A
Turnout		3,175	45.0	

== Geography ==
Rayners Lane is located in the upper part of the Crane Valley within the catchment area of the River Crane. The east and west branches of Yeading Brook, the dominant source of the Crane, pass through the surrounding area.

Built atop a railway bridge, the Underground station marks the highest point in the area. It is a focal point of the Rayners Lane conservation area, which includes the shopping parades north and south of the station. Beyond this area, terraced and semi-detached houses built in the 1930s form much of the district. In the 2021 census, 49.04% of households were reported to be terraced, the highest proportion of any ward in the London Borough of Harrow. The remainder were 32.29% semi-detached, 11.25% flats and 3.51% detached. Despite being a relatively small area, it boasts many retail chains.

== Demography ==
Religion in Rayners Lane ward (2021)
1. Hindu (39.9%)
2. Christian (28.1%)
3. Muslim (13.0%)
4. No Religion (8.80%)
5. Sikh (2.40%)
6. Buddhist (1.10%)
7. Jewish (0.20%)
8. Other Religions (1.70%)
9. Religion not Stated (4.70%)

The largest ethnic group in Rayners Lane ward in the 2011 census was Indian (28%), followed by White British (27%) and other Asian (21%). It has one of London's largest Tamil communities.

According to the 2021 census, 56.1% of the population identified as Asian, Asian British or Asian Welsh (including 30.43% as Indian and 20.65% as other Asian), followed by White (25.5%) and Other ethnic group (10.32%). The ward ranked 22nd in the London Borough of Harrow for people identifying as White and first for those identifying as Other ethnic group.

In the 2021 census, 39.9% of respondents identified as Hindu–the highest of all wards in the London Borough of Harrow–followed by 28.1% as Christian and 13% as Muslim. No Religion was answered by 8.8% of respondents. The ward also ranked first in Harrow among those identifying as Sikh at 2.44%. In the 2011 census, it was reported that 34 adherents of Zoroastrianism lived in the Rayners Lane ward.

Of Rayners Lane's residents aged 16 or over, 62.56% were reported as economically active. The main occupations were 'Professional occupations' and 'Managers, directors and senior officials'.

Ethnic group	2011 Census		2021 Census (Note: Ward boundaries used in the 2021 Census are different from the 2011 Census so results are not directly comparable)	
Ethnic group	Population	%	Population	%
Asian, Asian British or Asian Welsh (Note: 2011: Asian/Asian British)	6,064	54.5	5,135	56.1
Black, Black British, Black Welsh, Caribbean or African (Note: 2011: Black/African/Caribbean/Black British)	588	5.3	447	4.9
Mixed or Multiple ethnic groups	361	3.2	292	3.2
White	3,840	34.5	2,330	25.5
Other ethnic group	271	2.4	944	10.3
Total	11,124	100.0	9,148	100.0

== Landmarks ==
The principal point of architectural interest is the Grade II* listed former Ace Cinema, an Art Deco building designed by F.E. Bromige that opened in 1936. Notably, it features a stylised elephant's trunk on the entrance canopy. The building was acquired in 2000 by the Zoroastrian Trust Funds of Europe and is now known as the Zoroastrian Centre. It is the only temple of its type in the UK.

Charles Holden and Reginald Uren designed the station building at Rayners Lane tube station which opened in 1938. It was Grade II listed in 1994, noted for the mature design of its frontage and the variety of the surviving signage and fixtures.

The Rayners Public House was Grade II listed in 2006 by Historic England. It is a notable example of 1930s public house architecture retaining much of its original joinery and fittings. It closed as a public house in 2006 and is now occupied by the Christ the Redeemer religious training college.

The shops at 464-472 Alexandra Avenue are locally listed by Harrow Council. They were built in the International style by R.C. White-Cooper and S.R. Turner in 1937.

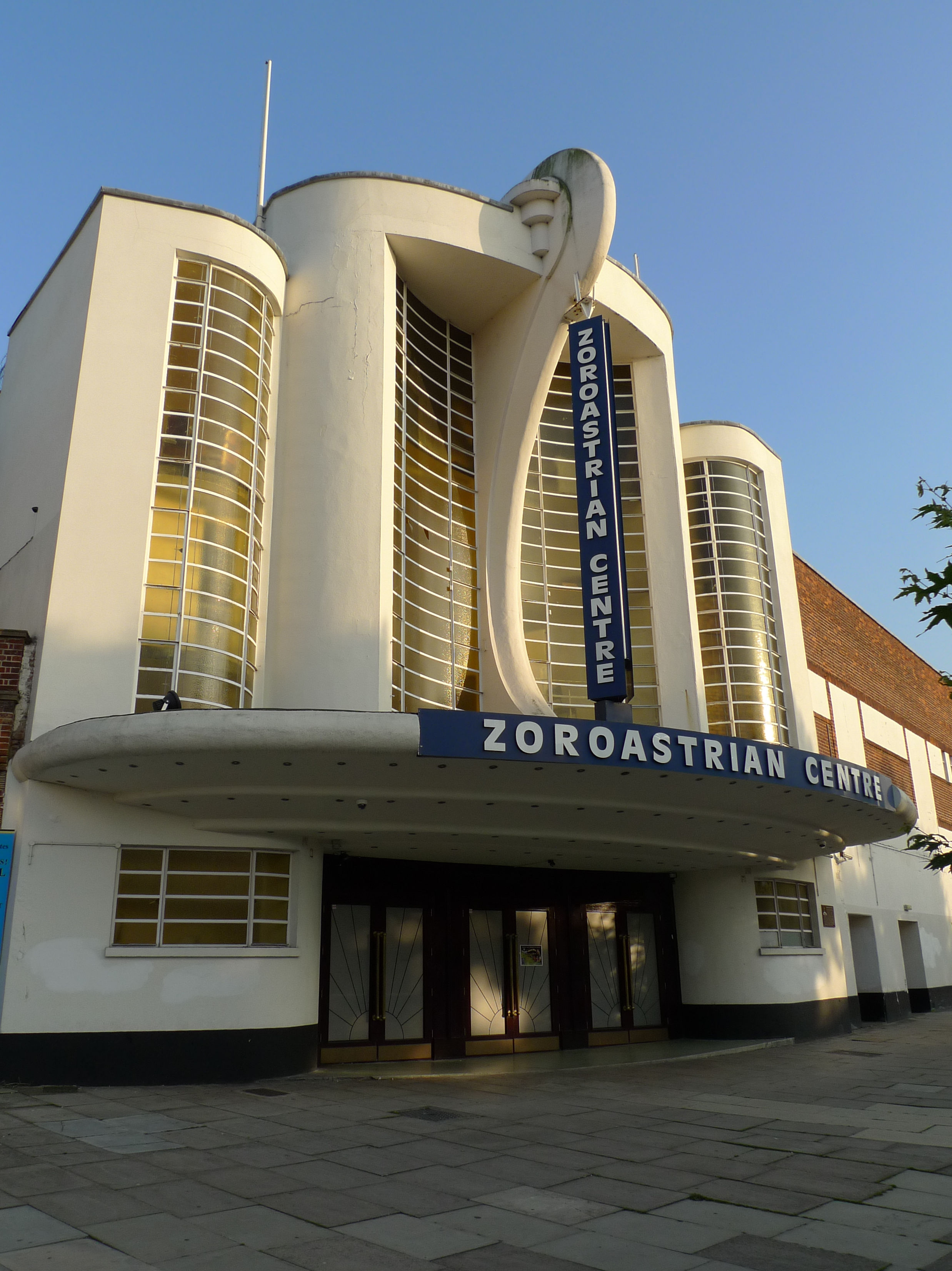
Zoroastrian Centre

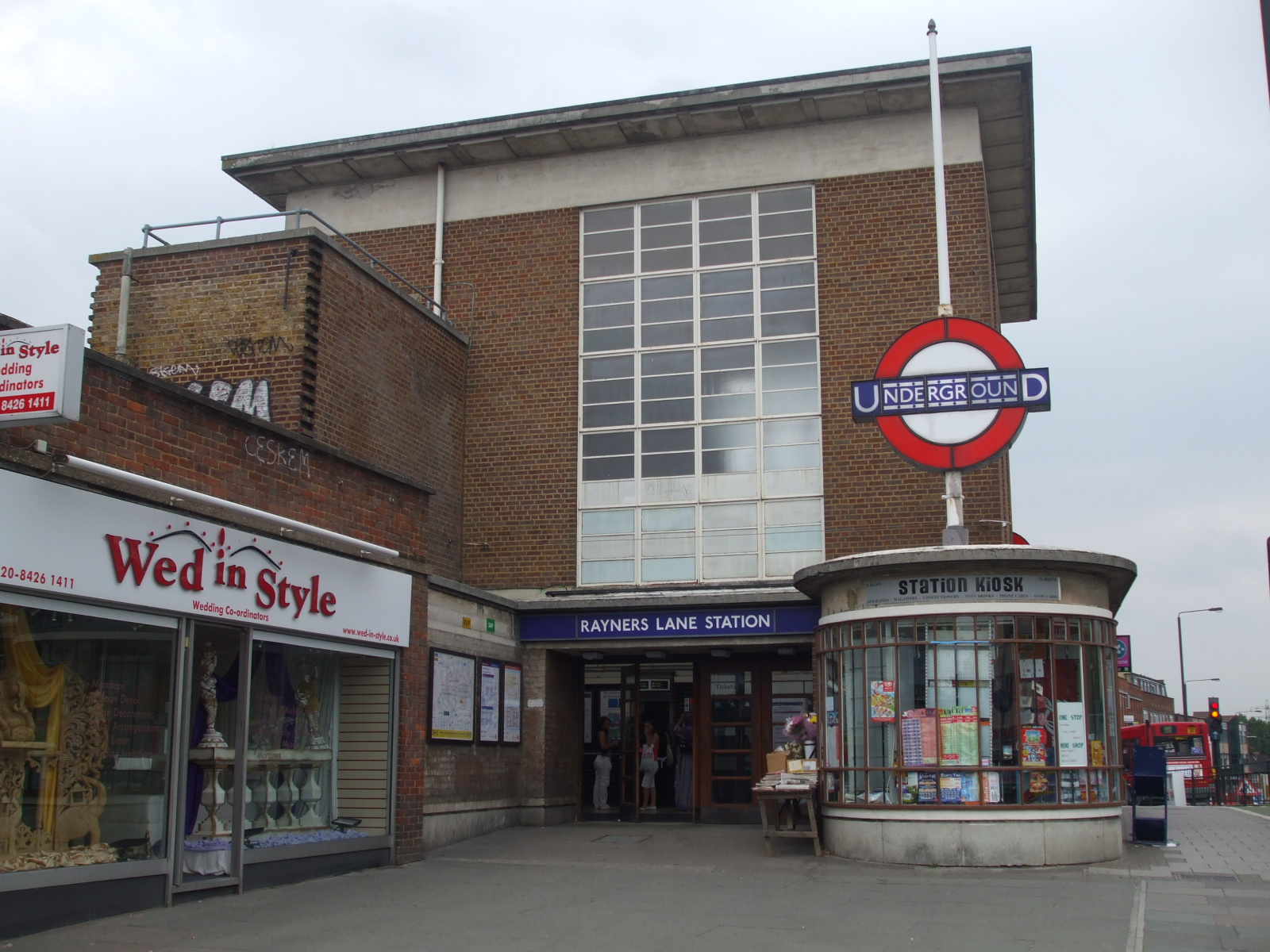
Rayners Lane Station

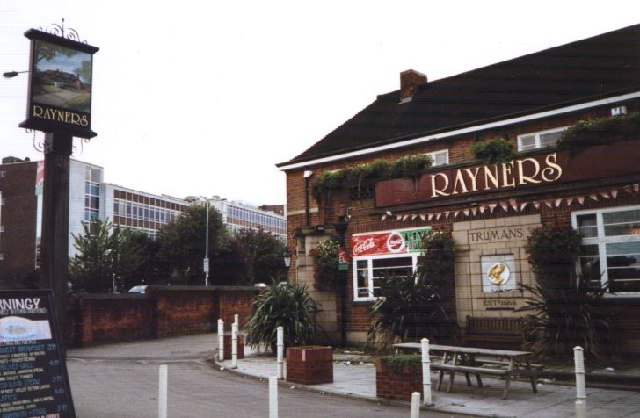
Rayners Public House

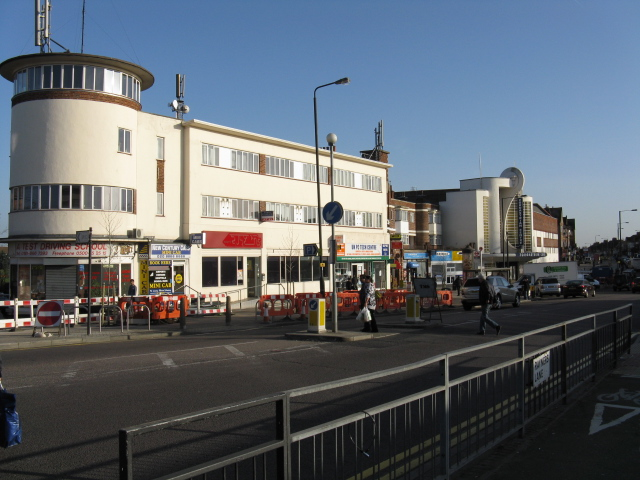
464-472 Alexandra Avenue (left)

== Education and Community ==
=== Education ===
Roxbourne Primary School is the only school in the Rayners Lane ward. Outside the ward, nearby schools include Longfield Primary School; Newton Farm Nursery, Infant and Junior School; and Buckingham Preparatory School. A library used to be located on Imperial Drive, but was closed in 2015 as part of budget cuts by Harrow Council despite objections raised during a public consultation.

=== Religion ===
In addition to the Zoroastrian Centre, Rayners Lane Baptist Church and a Quaker Meeting House reside nearby. The Baptist church was founded in 1934 and dedicated to Janet Hoare, a missionary who died in India while still young. Her father became the first minister of the church. The Quaker Meeting House was the first in Harrow, erected in 1935.

== Sport and Leisure ==
Rayners Lane F.C. and Broadfields United F.C. play at the Tithe Farm Sports & Social Club. As of the 2024/25 season, Rayners Lane play in the Isthmian League South Central Division. In 2021, Broadfields United entered a groundshare agreement with Rayners Lane having previously groundshared with Harefield United. They play in the Combined Counties League Premier Division North as of the 2024/25 season.

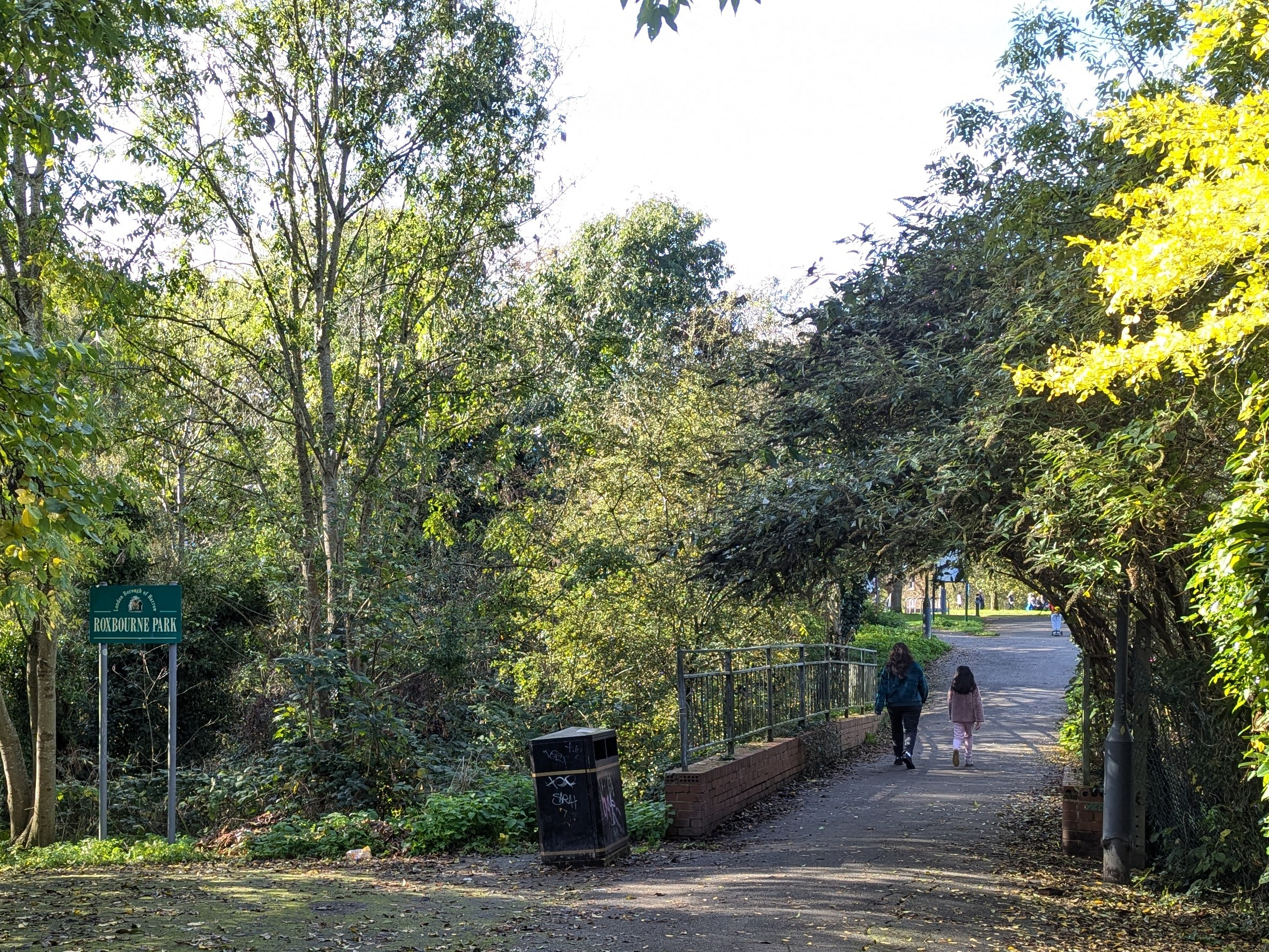
Roxbourne Park

Rayners Lane also has a sports club called Harrow Town Sports Club which has been in existence since the 1890s. It is the home of the Harrow Town Cricket Club who have played in the Middlesex County Cricket League since 2002. Venceremos FC and the HT Tennis Club are also based at the sports club.

There are several open spaces in or near Rayners Lane including Rayners Mead, Newton Park and Roxbourne Park. Yeading Brook runs through Roxbourne Park which has a miniature railway open to the public on Sundays and provides access to the Roxbourne Nature Reserve.

Newton Farm Ecology Park is a small area of meadows and woodland located between Alexandra Avenue and Rayners Lane that was converted into a nature reserve in 1990. It is situated on what was once a floodplain where the east branch of Yeading Brook and the Roxbourne River converge.

== Transport ==
=== London Underground ===
The Metropolitan and Piccadilly lines converge at Rayners Lane Station. Both lines run services westbound along the same track towards Uxbridge. Eastbound Metropolitan line services run into central London via Harrow-on-the-Hill while eastbound Piccadilly line services run via South Harrow and Acton Town. Some westbound Piccadilly line trains terminate at the station by making use of a reversing siding.

=== Bus routes ===
Four bus routes serve the area. The H12 runs between South Harrow and Stanmore; the H9 and H10 run anticlockwise and clockwise routes of Harrow respectively and the 398 runs between Wood End in Northolt and Ruislip tube station.

== In popular culture ==
"Rural Rayners Lane" is mentioned in John Betjeman's poem The Metropolitan Railway (Baker Street Station Buffet). It was published in his 1954 anthology A Few Late Chrysanthemums and his Collected Poems in 1958.

== Notable people ==
Former Cunard officer Commodore Harry Grattidge, one of the last captains of the RMS Queen Elizabeth, lived at number 33 High Worple, Rayners Lane until his death in the 1970s.

=== Dev Patel ===
Dev Patel is a BAFTA award-winning internationally renowned British actor who grew up in Rayners Lane.

=== Jai Paul ===
Jai Paul is an electronic music recording artist signed to XL Recordings, whose influential songs of the 2010s have been sampled by Drake and Beyoncé. He and his brother A. K. Paul grew up in Rayners Lane.

== Sources ==
- Conservation Area Appraisal
- Rayners Lane Station TFL
