= Kharshedji Rustomji Cama =

Indian reformer (1831-1909)

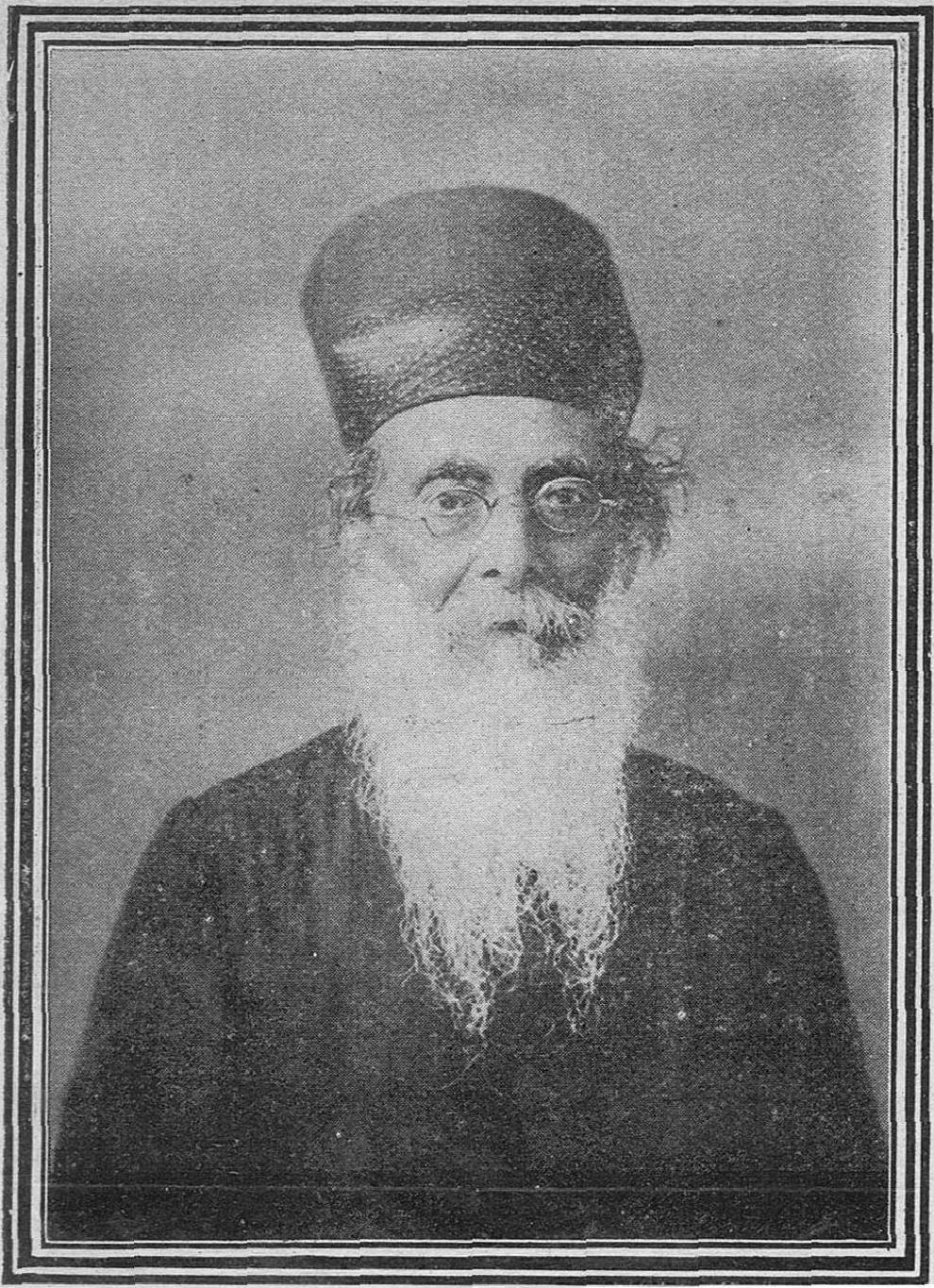

Kharshedji Rustomji Cama (1831–1909), often known as K. R. Cama, was an Indian Parsi scholar and reformer from Bombay.

== Early life ==
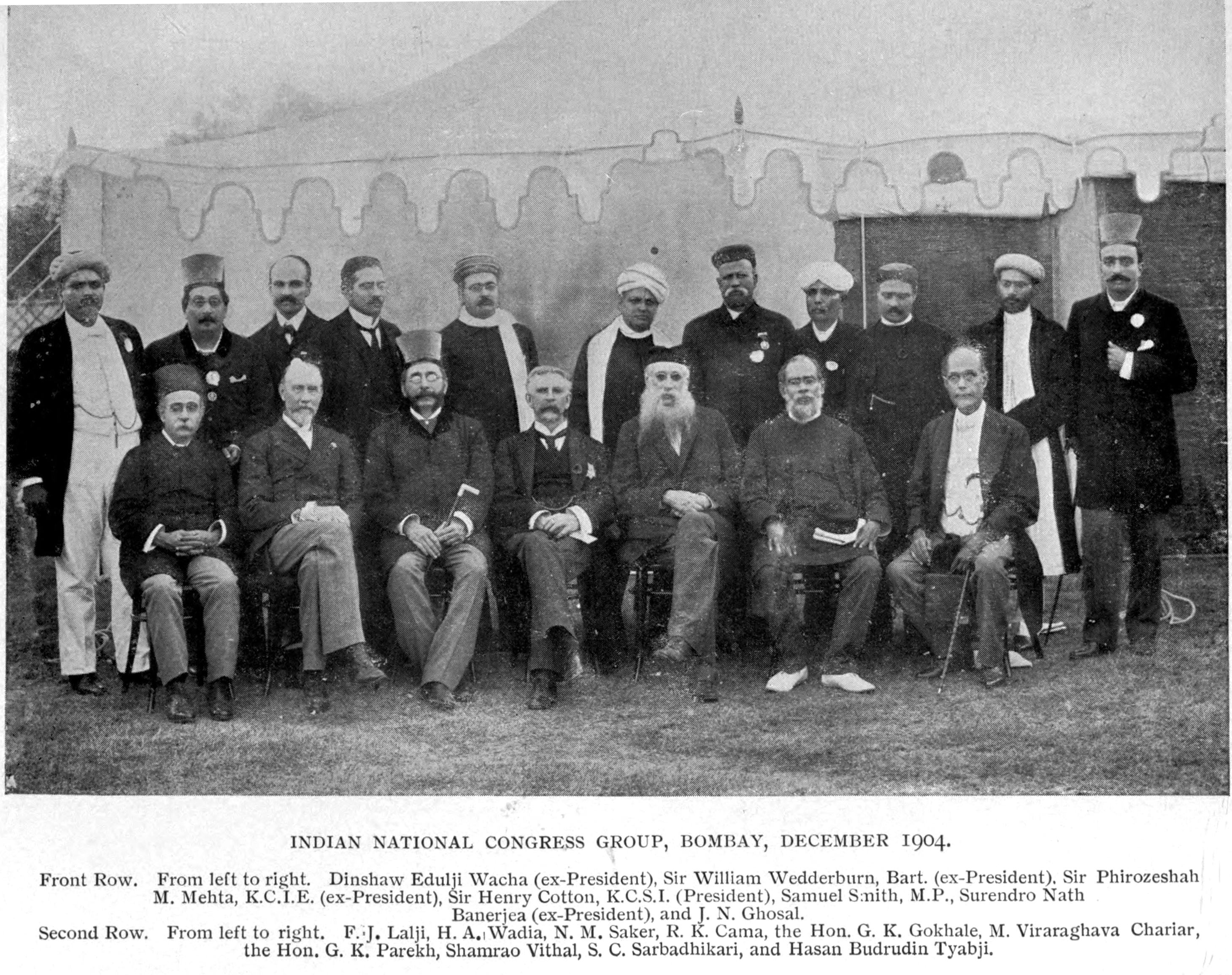
Indian National Congress group in 1904; Cama is fourth from the left, standing in the back row.

Born in a privileged family, Cama gained a reputation as a scholar. He had a traditional Parsi education, and then went to Elphinstone School in Bombay. Leaving in 1849, he joined a trading house in Calcutta, and then travelled in 1850 to London, returning in 1854 to Bombay. He went into business with Dadabhai Naoroji, and again visited Europe in 1855, and studied with orientalists there: Julius Mohl and Julius Oppert in Paris, and Friedrich von Spiegel at the University of Erlangen. Naoroji with Cama and his cousin Muncherjee Hormusji Cama set up the first Indian trading firm in Europe, based in London and Liverpool. Cama and Naoroji then dropped out, however, because of the firm's dealings in alcohol and opium.

== Reformer ==
There was an identifiable group of Bombay Parsi reformers, including Naoroji, Cama and Manockjee Cursetjee who were concerned with educational reform, the position of women, and political participation. These interests typically went hand in hand with opposition to the local Panchayat, and religious reform. Cama supported the major reformist publication Rast Goftar ("Herald of Truth"), founded in 1851.

Cama was a member of the Amelioration Society set up in 1855 by Merwanji Framji Panday, which brought together reformers and conservative Parsis. In the 1860s he began to concentrate on his own intellectual roots, and worked to develop education in the Parsi community. He was an influential figure also in the Asiatic Society of Bombay.

Cama emerged as the leading religious reformer of the period, and founded an association, the Zarthoshti Din-ni Khol Karnari Mandali ("Society for Promoting Research on the Zoroastrian Religion") to promote his views, based on a meeting with dasturs in 1864. His studies in Europe of Avestan and Pahlavi gave him assurance in criticising scholarly deficiencies of the local priesthood. His programme included the exclusion from Parsi religious practice of all Hindu elements, and improvement of the Madressa schools; in the case of the Sir Jamsetjee Jejeebhoy Zarthoshti Madressa (founded 1863) he intervened in 1881 to reform the system and entry requirements. He was a founding director of the Alexandra Native Girls' English Institution. Behramji Malabari's social programme, aimed at reforming Hindu custom, also attracted his support. Conservative orthodox Parsis named the reforming group around the Mandali the "Paris Protestants".

== Influence ==
From 1861 Cama taught Avestan and Pahlavi in his home, with methods drawing on European philology. His students included Sheriarji Dadabhai Bharucha, whom he taught Pahlavi. He was an early influence on Jivanji Jamshedji Modi, later his biographer.

Interested in calendar reform, Cama published on the Zoroastrian calendar in the 1860s. He contested the accepted date of the arrival of Parsis in India, setting it at 936, against the date then received (Dastur Kamdin) of 716. In the 1870s he went on to speculate more broadly on religion, encompassing Mithraism and freemasonry in his interests, and addressing those outside the Parsi community.

== Legacy ==
The K. R. Cama Oriental Institute was established in 1916 to perpetuate his memory, following meetings at which the British administration, Parsi reformers, businessmen, and Wilson College were represented. The Hindu merchant Damodhardas Gordhandas Sukhadwala offered financial support for an institute, which was inaugurated by Lord Willingdon. Initially it was housed at the Sukhadwala building in Hornby Street. From 1936 it had its own premises, at 136 Apollo Street, Fort, Bombay. It publishes books and a journal. From an initial library consisting of works from Cama's personal collection, it has assembled a research library for orientalists.

== Family ==
Cama was twice married. His son Rustamji was married to Bhikaiji Cama.

== See Also ==
- The K. R. Cama Oriental Institute
