= F. E. Bromige =

British architect

Frank Ernest Bromige (5 July 1902 – 23 December 1979) was a British architect of the Modernist and Art Deco styles. He is principally known for designing leisure buildings, especially cinemas, working mainly in Greater London and surrounding areas.

== Life and career ==
Bromige was born in Lisson Grove, Marylebone in 1902. In 1921, after a year studying at the School of Architecture at the London Polytechnic, he started working in the architectural practice of Clifford Aish. This commercial practice specialised in shops, offices, and increasingly cinemas. In 1931, Bromige set up his own practice, although he was not a registered architect until 1933.

His firm worked extensively on designing cinema buildings in spacious suburban settings. According with the rapid development of suburban architecture of 1930s London, cinemas and other leisure buildings were recognisably modern and innovative, and also accounted for the need to attract customers as they travelled past. This meant sculptural concrete forms, and bold graphic design and lighting. Bromige's audacious designs reflected his belief in the role of cinemas as important landmark buildings in suburban settings, and so paralleled the work of American cinema architect S. Charles Lee. Early on in his career Bromige drew on Art Deco, but by the mid-1930s he was inspired by German expressionist architecture, such as Erich Mendelsohn's Einstein Tower. Further parallels can be seen with the work of Joseph Embleton at Blackpool Pleasure Beach.

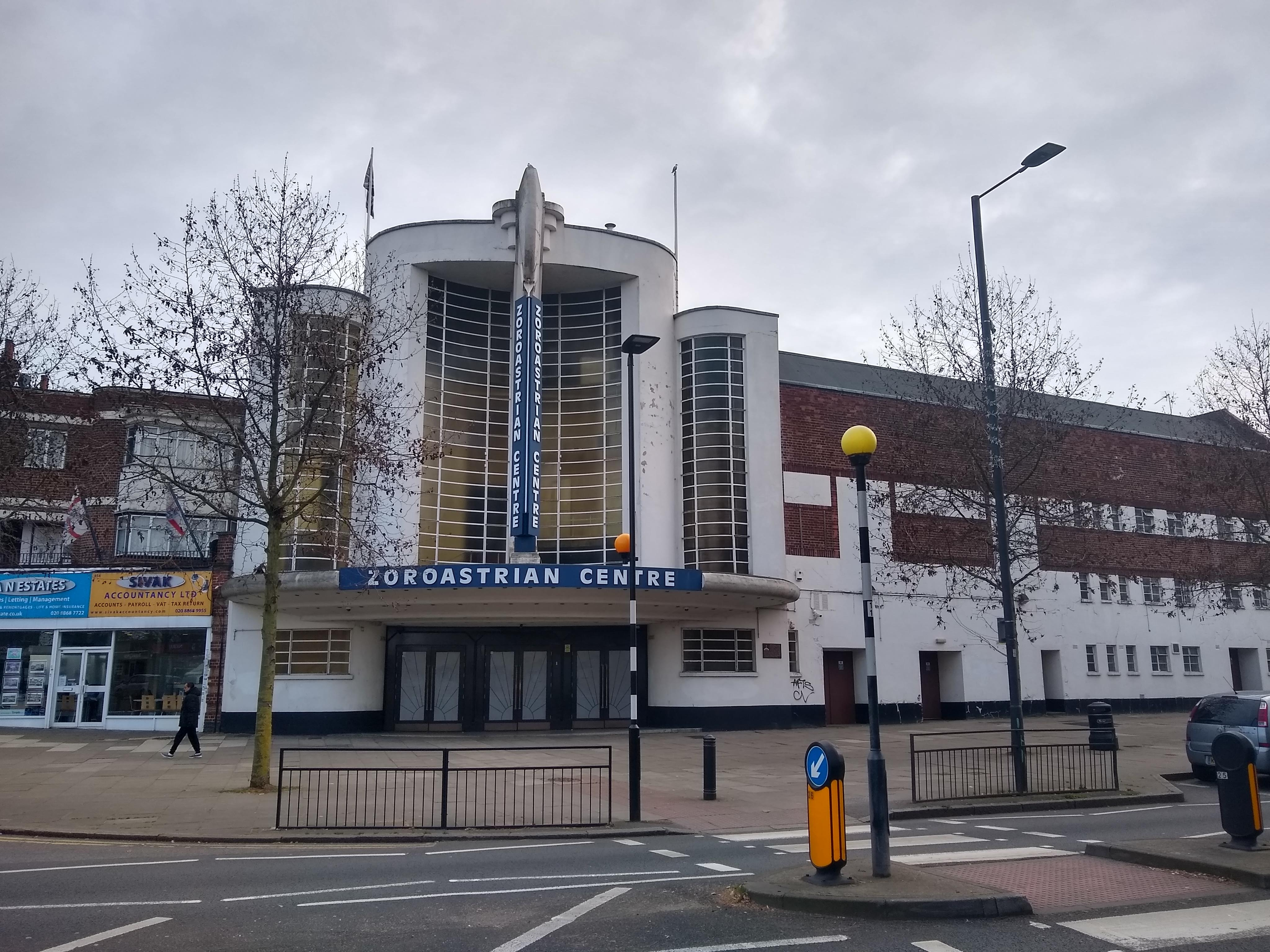
Ace Cinema, Rayners Lane

Bromige focused on cinema design in the 1930s. Several cinema buildings that he designed have been listed by Historic England, namely the Grade II* listed Ace Cinema in Rayners Lane (1936), the Grade II listed Dominion in Acton (1937), and the Grade II listed Rio Cinema, Dalston, which was rebuilt to Bromige's design in 1937. His other cinema designs include the Granada in Hove (1933), the Dominion in Southall (1935; demolished 1982), and the Dominion in Harrow (1936), described as "one of the most remarkable cinema buildings ever to be erected in Britain". As of 2025, having previously been covered over with steel since the 1960s, the Harrow Dominion's facade has been uncovered and restored as part of a new apartment block.

In the postwar period, housebuilding was prioritised, and Bromige's final cinema project was the Regal in Hitchin, opened in 1939. Beyond designing cinemas, Bromige designed shops for the likes of WH Smith and Etam, mainly in West London. Other leisure buildings he worked on in his career included amusement arcades, such as in Jaywick, and the Portsmouth Stadium.

Bromige died on 23 December 1979.
