= Ace Cinema =

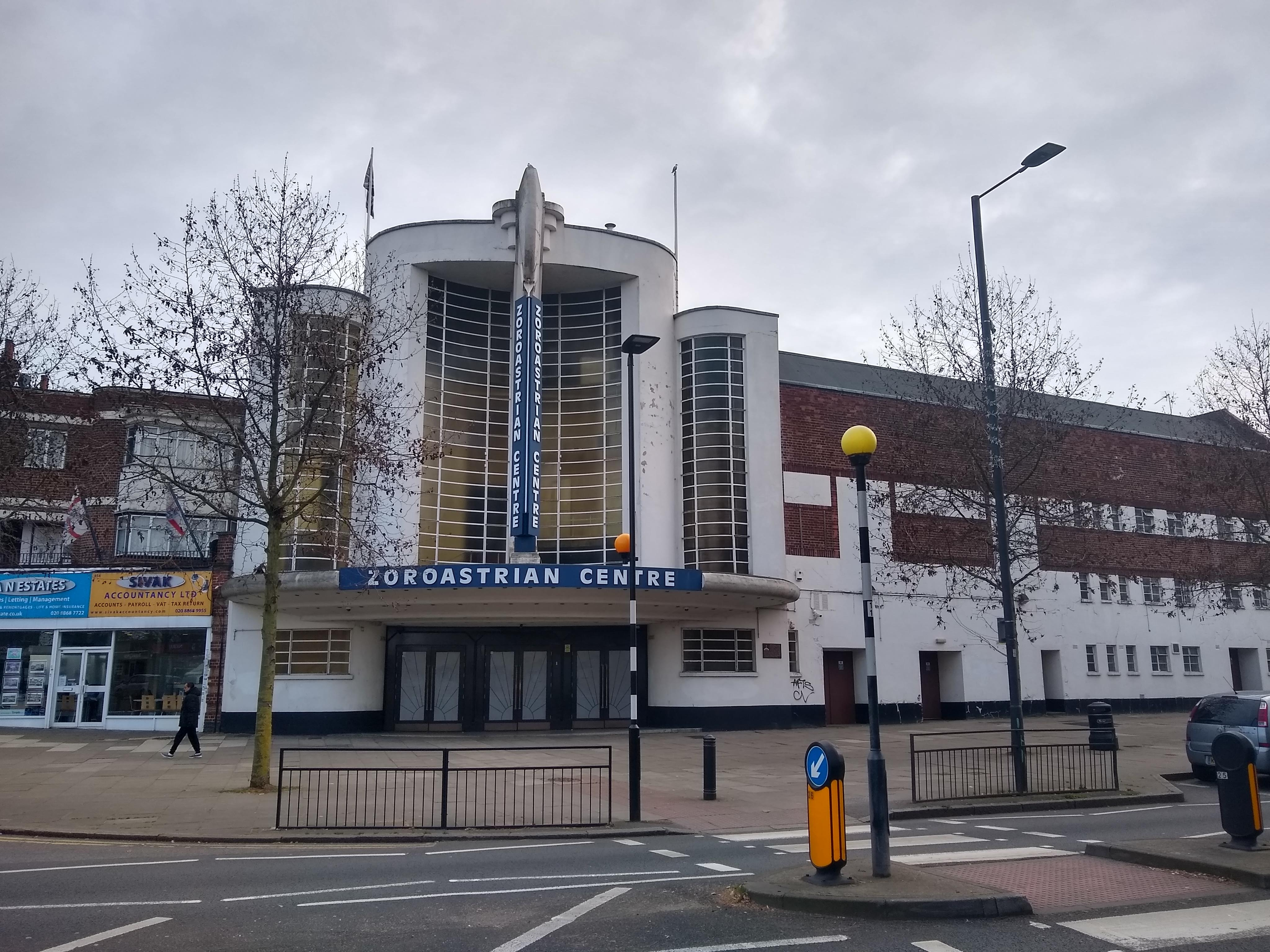

- Location within London Borough of Harrow
- 51°34′26″N 0°22′14″W
- Type: Cinema
- Location: Rayners Lane
- OS grid reference: TQ 13010 87371

History
- Built: 1936

Site notes
- Area: Harrow
- Architect: F.E. Bromige
- Architectural style: Art Deco
- Owner: ZTFE

Listed Building – Grade II
- Official name: Ace Cinema
- Designated: 13 March 1981
- Reference no.: 1079729

Listed Building – Grade II*
- Official name: Ace Cinema
- Designated: 27 January 1984
- Reference no.: 1079729

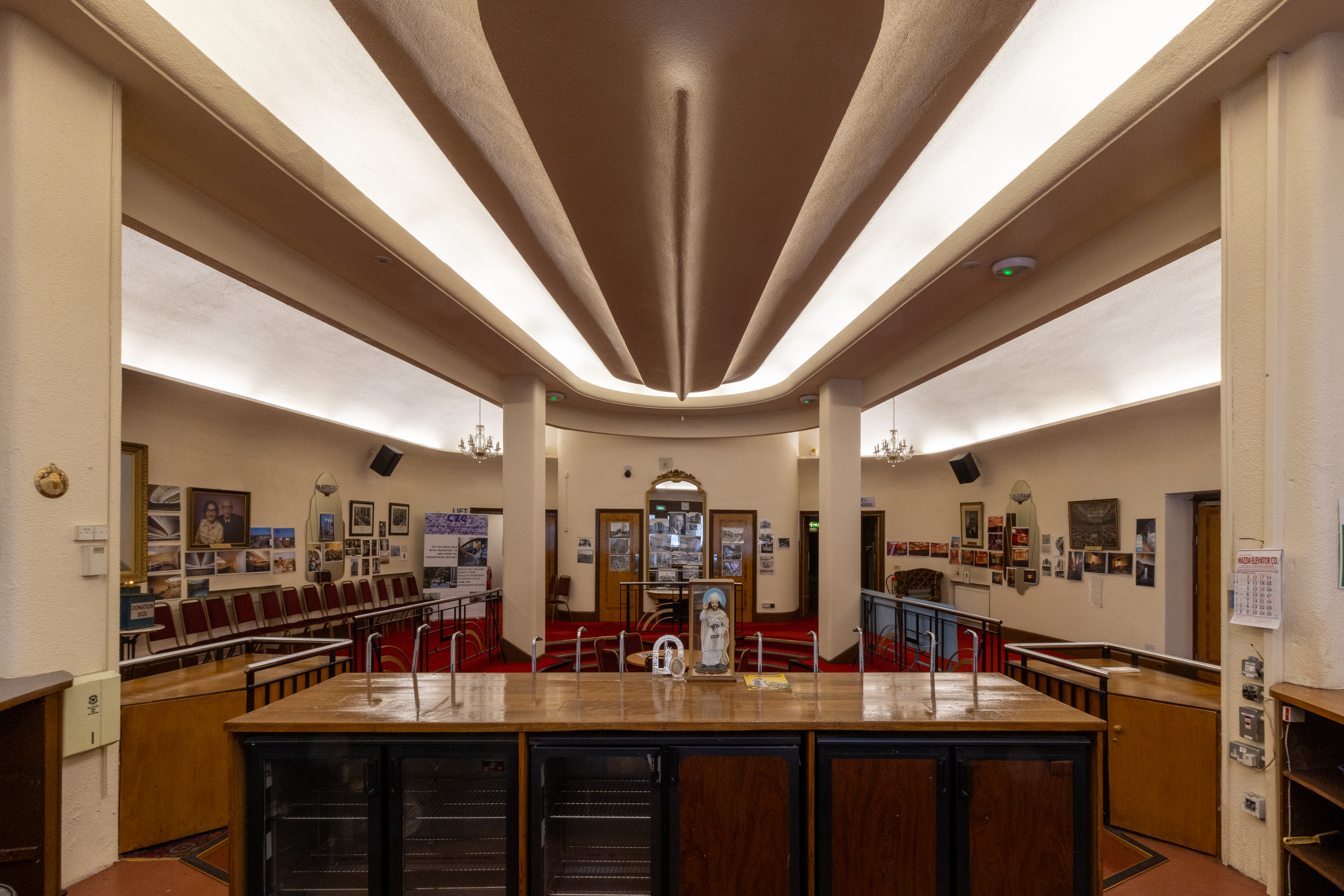
Lobby of the Zoroastrian Centre

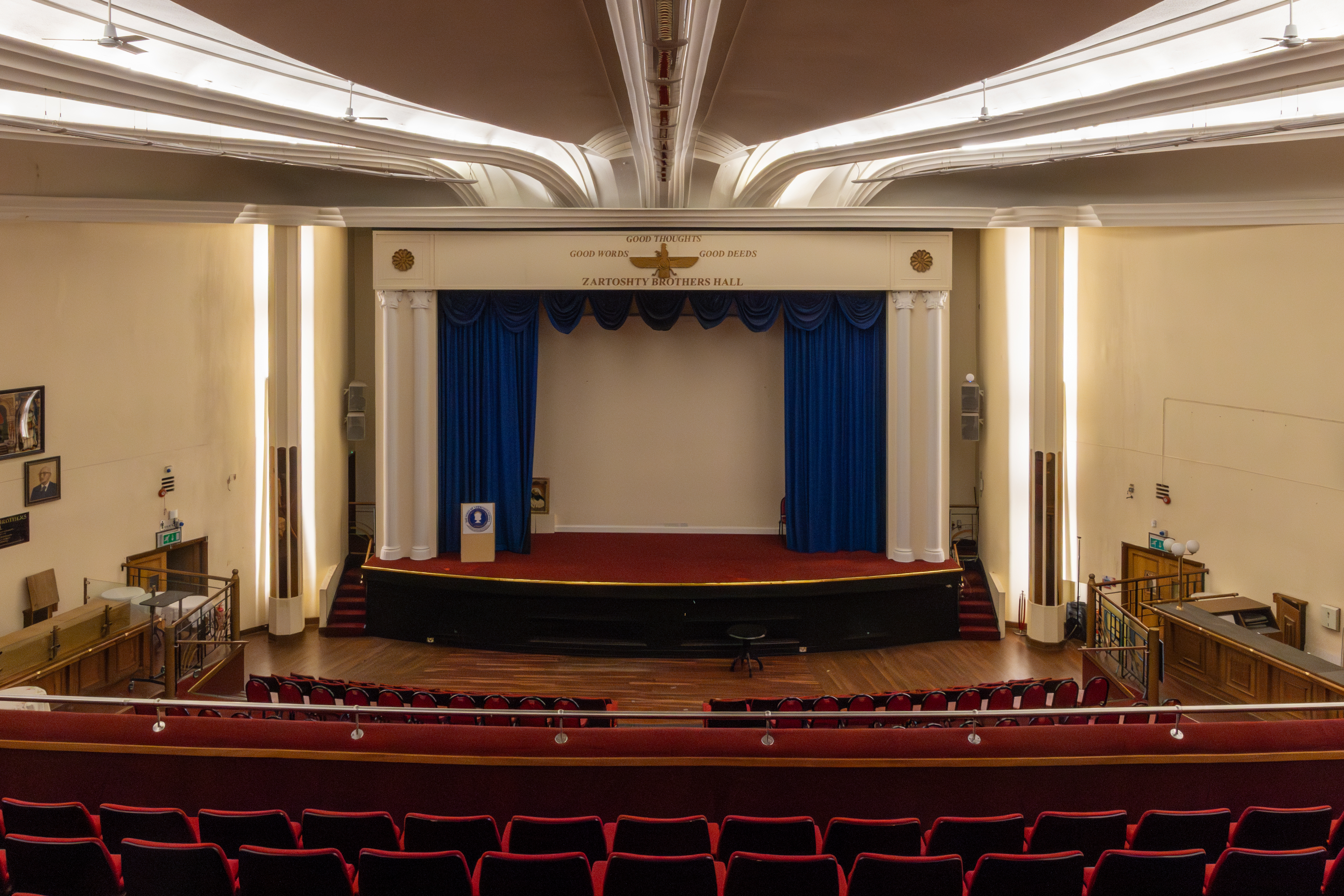
Auditorium of the Zoroastrian Centre

The Ace Cinema, originally the Grosvenor Cinema and now known as the Zoroastrian Centre, is a Grade II* listed Art Deco former cinema in Rayners Lane in the London Borough of Harrow.

== Building ==
Ace cinema is streamlined Art Deco in style, the facade featuring a central concrete sculpted design of a stylized elephant's head with a trunk. The auditorium has a circle that originally seated 405 and stalls that originally seated 830. There was originally a stage 44 feet deep and six dressing rooms, and the oval foyer had a sunken area that contained a café.

== History ==
Ace cinema was designed by Frank Ernest Bromige and opened as the Grosvenor Cinema on 12 October 1936, showing The Country Doctor. On 5 May 1937 it became part of the Odeon chain; it was subsequently renamed the Odeon in 1941, the Gaumont in 1950, and once more the Odeon in 1964, by which time the seating had been reduced from the original 1,235 to 1,185.

After the Harrow borough council refused an application by Odeon's parent organisation Rank to convert the cinema into a bingo hall, it was acquired by Ace, a small independent group, and on 1 October 1981 became the Ace Cinema; it was closed on 6 October 1986. From 1991 it was the Grosvenor Cine/Bar Experience, with the Ace Bar wine bar in the foyer and a night club, Studio Warehouse, in the auditorium. This closed later in the decade, after which the building was unused until 2000, when the Zoroastrian Centre for Europe acquired it; it is now the Zoroastrian Centre.

The building was Grade II listed on 13 March 1981 and upgraded to Grade II* on 27 January 1984, at which time it was noted as the least altered example of a late 1930s cinema in this style.
