= Della Adventure Park =

Amusement park in Maharashtra, India

Della Adventure Park is an Indian amusement park located in the state of Maharashtra. It was started in 2013 by the Della Group and is spread across 36 acres in Kunegaon, Lonavala. In addition to over fifty recreational activities including adventure sports and glamping activities, the park also houses Della Resorts, a resort with hotels, villas, and five restaurants.

According to Conde Nast Traveller India, it is India's largest recreation park.

== See also ==
- Wonderla
- Imagicaa
- Worlds of Wonder
- Essel World
