= F. D. Alpaiwalla Museum =

Framji Dadabhoy Alpaiwalla Museum
- Location within Mumbai Location within Maharashtra
- Established: 1952; 74 years ago
- Location: Malabar Hill, Mumbai, Maharashtra, India
- Coordinates: 18.95°N 72.795°E
- Type: Archaeology museum, History museum and Ethnographic museum
- Director: Pheroza J. Godrej
- Owner: Bombay Parsi Punchayet
- Public transit access: Grant Road

The Framji Dadabhoy Alpaiwalla Museum is an archaeological and ethnographic museum in the city of Mumbai, India that contains artifacts relating to the history and heritage of India's Zoroastrian community. Set up and maintained by the Bombay Parsi Punchayet, the museum consists of two sections: the F. D. Alpaiwalla Collection and archaeological finds from Iran donated by Zoroastrian priest and archaeologist Ervad Jamshed Unvala. Housed in the Khareghat Memorial Building in Malabar Hill, the F. D. Alpaiwalla Museum is the only museum in the world dedicated to the Zoroastrian community.

== History ==
The Alpaiwalla Museum was set up in 1952 (or 1954 as per the Bombay Parsi Punchayet) to house the personal collection of Parsi bullion merchant Framji Dadabhoy Alpaiwalla. Alpaiwalla's collection included many interesting objects such as a firman issued by the Mughal emperor Jahangir dated 1618 CE granting land to two Parsi gentlemen of Navsari in Gujarat. Other items donated by Alpaiwalla included chinaware and 19th century oil portraits.

In 1951, Pahlavi scholar, priest and archaeologist, Jamshedji Maneckji Unvala (1888-1961) excavated an old dakhma in Yazd, Iran and donated its contents to the Alpaiwalla Museum. These excavated artifacts form the core of the museum's archaeology collection. The dakhma was hastily created sometime in the 17th century for victims of a plague epidemic. Unvala also donated items he had gathered a French-sponsored excavation at Susa in the 1920s and other excavations he had participated in his lifetime. Unvala served as the first curator of the Alpaiwalla Museum.

The museum has been renovated twice - first in 1984 and then, for a second time between 2018 and 2025. The museum has participated in both national as well as international exhibitions. In 2013, some of the museum's artifacts were transported to the United Kingdom where they were housed at the Brunei Gallery, London as part of an exhibition on Zoroastrianism by the School of Oriental and African Studies (SOAS), University of London, titled The Everlasting Flame - Zoroastrianism in History and Imagination from 11 October 2013 to 15 December 2013. In 2016, the exhibition travelled to Delhi where the artifacts were housed at the National Museum as part of a programme organised from 21 March 2016 to 15 May 2016 jointly by Ministry of Culture, Ministry of Minority Affairs and UNESCO-PARZOR and inaugurated by India's then Minister of Finance and Information and Broadcasting, Arun Jaitley.

From 2018 to 2025 the museum was closed for renovations. The glass display cases dating from the 1970s were replaced and a replica Fire temple was built as an addition to the existing museum. The renovated museum with the latest lighting, Braille display signboards and other amenities made with the help of a Ministry of Culture grant was opened on 27 March 2025.

== Artifacts ==
Among the prized artifacts exhibited at the museum are a copy of a firman by the Mughal Emperor Jahangir granting 25 acres of land to two Zoroastrian priests from Navsari, a replica of the "Cyrus Cylinder", and the calling card of Dadabhai Naoroji, the Grand Old Man of India and the first Indian to be elected to the House of Commons. It also features old photographs of Mumbai city, Chinese porcelain, a mannequin of a Parsi woman dressed in traditional gara saree and a library with 1900 books.

== Website ==
- "F. D. Alpaiwala Museum". Bombay Parsi Punchayet.
