= Rio Cinema, Dalston =

Art Deco cinema in Dalston, London, England

Rio Cinema
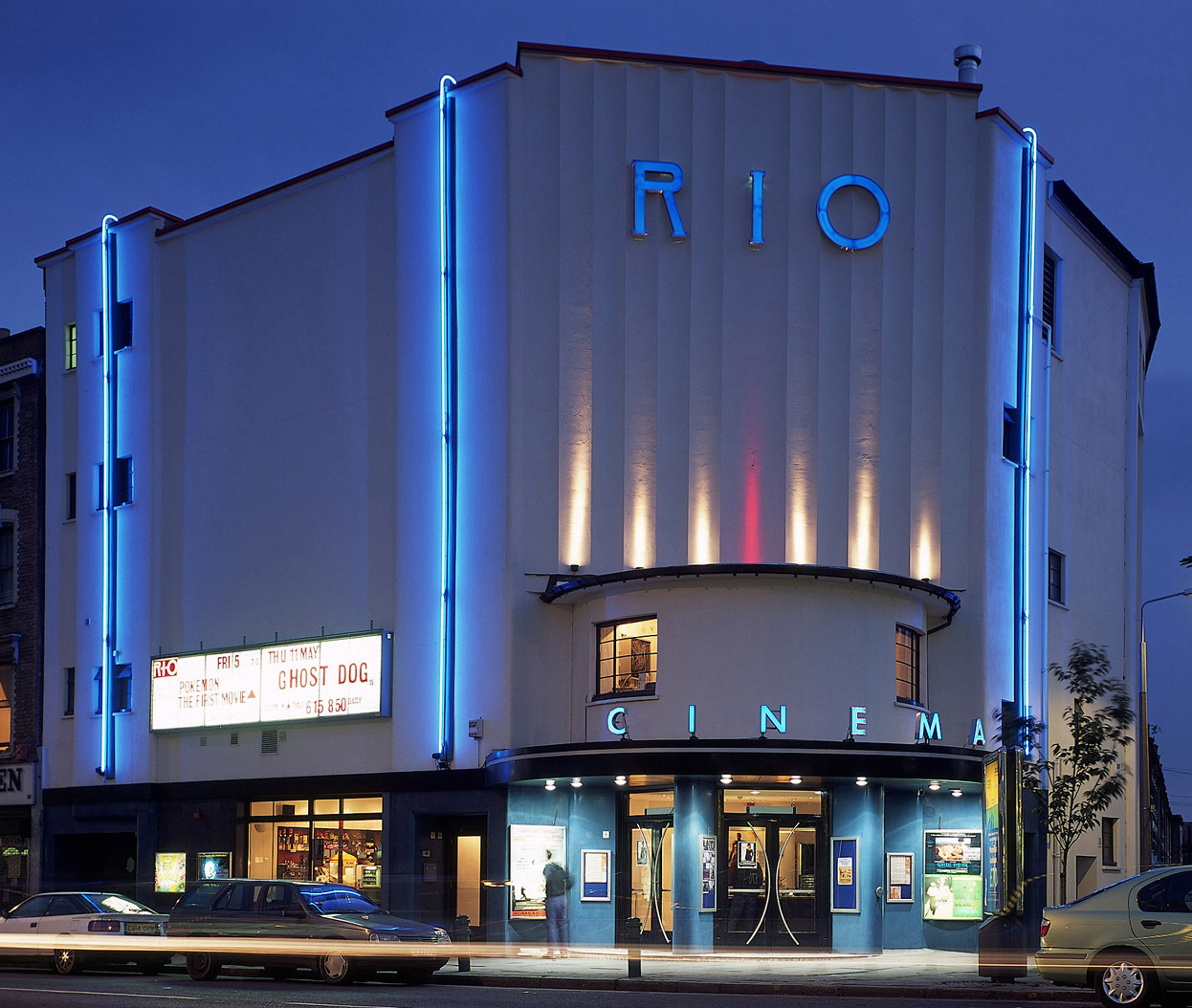
- The Rio Cinema
- Former names: Kingsland Picture Palace, Kingsland Empire, Classic, Tatler

General information
- Location: Kingsland, East London, 107 Kingsland High Street, London, E8 2PB, United Kingdom
- Coordinates: 51.5496°N 0.0756°W
- Opened: 1909

Other information
- Seating capacity: 402 (screen 1), 28 (screen 2)

Website
- www.riocinema.org.uk
Designations
Listed Building – Grade II
- Designated: 1 Feb 1999
- Reference no.: 1244939
- Listed for: special architectural or historic interest

The Rio Cinema is a Grade II listed independent Art Deco cinema in Dalston, east London. It is a popular independent cinema located on Kingsland High Street, with a history stretching back over 100 years. The Rio added a second screen in the unused basement space in December 2017.

The Rio was named one of London's best cinemas by The Daily Telegraph and best cinema bars by the Evening Standard.

== Programming and events ==
The programme usually includes one main feature film each week, chosen by head projectionist Peter Howden. These range from arthouse to blockbusters. There is usually a Saturday late show, Bargain Mondays, Tuesday discounts for Hackney Library Card holders, and regular Parents and Babies screenings. The Rio also works with programming partners such as the East End Film Festival, The London Feminist Film Festival, Doc'n Roll and the Fringe! Gay Film Fest.

It also hosts film festivals including the annual Turkish Film Festival, which began at the cinema in 1994.

As a charity, the cinema undertakes cultural outreach through cut-price tickets for the children's and community screenings, schools events, and a monthly classic matinee for over-60s. Every year hundreds of schoolchildren attend film screenings and educational events at the Rio Cinema.

The building is open 364 days a year, with over 1300 screenings annually. The stalls on the ground floor seat 188, and the circle (open on busy days) seats 214, the new second screen in the basement seats 28 with a wheelchair space.

== History ==
=== Kingsland Palace & Kingsland Empire ===
The building was originally an auctioneer's shop, converted into the Kingsland Palace in 1909 by owner Clara Ludski, a second-generation Jewish immigrant. It was one of five cinemas in Dalston and an immediate hit.

Its success led to properties either side being bought up, and the architect George Coles was commissioned to design a new single-screen picturehouse. Construction began in 1913, and the Kingsland Empire opened in 1915.

The Kingsland Empire's style was 'late Edwardian neo-classical'. There was a two-level tea room, domed tower, and an elaborate auditorium featuring five side arches and a proscenium with double Ionic columns either side, topped by a frieze. English Heritage say that the original Kingsland Empire was "more theatrical in planning and decoration than most cinemas of that date".

=== 1930s Art Deco ===
In 1933 the cinema was purchased from Clara Ludski by London & Southern Cinemas Ltd, and in 1936 by Capital & Provincial News Theatres (who became at that time the Classic Cinema chain).

The building was refurbished in Art Deco style by cult architect F. E. Bromige in 1937 and reopened as the Classic Cinema Dalston, within the shell of the earlier cinema. The ceiling and upper walls of the earlier auditorium survive, only accessible from the roof. As many cinemas were remodelled with the arrival of sound in the 1930s, nowhere else are two very different auditoria found one within the other. According to English Heritage, this is "an exceptionally rare survival". The exterior has remained almost unchanged since the thirties.

F E Bromige achieved a remarkable sense of rhythm and movement through simple means in his few cinemas, all in North London, and he has emerged as a specialist cinema architect of rare originality.

— English Heritage

=== 1940s to early 1970s ===
The Classic sustained bomb blast damage during The Blitz in 1941 when a high explosive bomb fell across the street in Birkbeck Mews. In the early 1950s the cinema received a makeover with simplified signage and neon, in 1958 it became the Classic Cartoon Theatre, and in 1960 it became the Classic Continental showing foreign language films. Its next guise was as a Tatler Cinema Club in 1971, screening uncensored adult films with live striptease burlesque acts on stage.

=== 1976 to present day ===
In April 1976, local businessman Paul Theodorou took over the cinema and renamed it the Rio. The following year, a working group of locals was formed with the intention of running the cinema as a cooperative community hub. This ambition was realised in April 1979 with the aid of a grant from the Greater London Council. Since then, it has been run as a not-for-profit registered charity with an elected board of local people who act as volunteer trustees. The current chairman of the board is Patrick Lyons.

The blue and pink Art Deco interior was restored in 1997, remaining faithful to Bromige's design, and the building became Grade II listed in 1999. Elain Harwood of English Heritage called the cinema a 'remarkable' work of ‘sweeping curves’.

The bus stop outside the building was renamed as 'Rio Cinema' in 2012 after thousands of people successfully petitioned Transport for London.

Local people were warned to 'use it or lose it' as box office revenues declined in 2013. Over £4000 was raised, and the cinema seems determined to live on.

Following a staff paycut in 2013 in May 2016 staff went on strike over a Living Wage pay dispute and threat of redundancies.

In August 2016 it was announced that a second screen would be added in the basement space of the Rio, opening in summer 2017.

In 2017 the cinema successfully raised £125,000 to restore the art deco exterior and build a second screen in the large basement space, the second screen seating 28 opened in December 2017.

In May 2019, the cinema opened a new bar in the basement space, next to the second screen. The bar was named the Ludski Bar, in tribute to Clara Ludski, the original owner of the cinema.

In 2024 the cinema cancelled a Eurovision screening event in an Israeli boycott which led to an investigation by the Charity Commission.

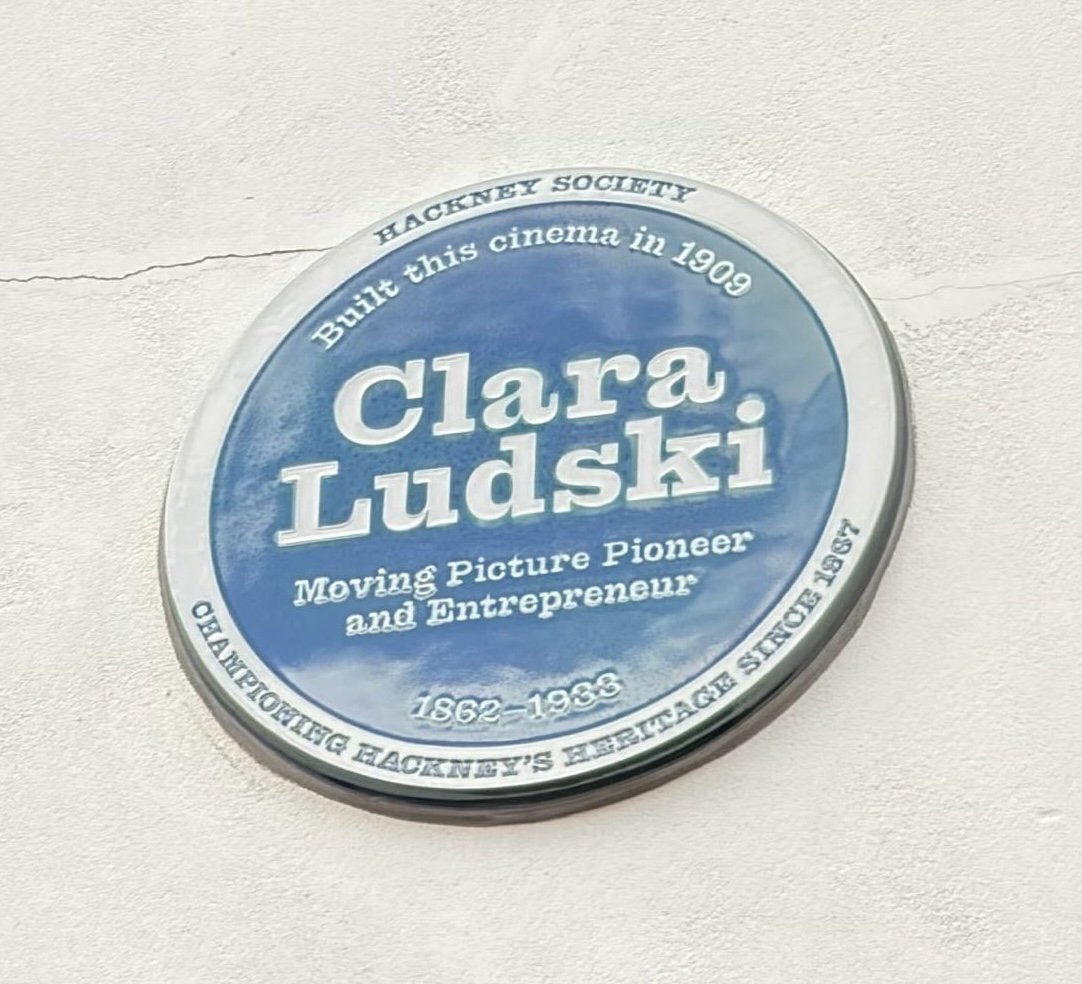
Commemorative Plaque on the Rio Cinema for Clara Ludski

In April 2026 a plaque was placed on the exterior of the Cinema in commemoration of Clara Ludski the original owner. This took place as part of the Women of Hackney Project by the Hackney Society.
