= Bombay Parsi Punchayet =

The Bombay Parsi Punchayet (Also known as Bombay Parsi Panchayat, Bombay Parsi Panchayet or BPP) is the apex body representing the Parsi Zoroastrian Community in Mumbai. BPP was founded in the 1670s. It is a charitable trust and is the city's largest private landlord controlling over 5500 houses meant for lower and middle class members of the Parsi community. It is also the Mumbai's oldest and richest charity.

The trust is the caretaker of Parsi properties in Mumbai such as B.D. Petit Parsee General Hospital, Parsi Lying-in Hospital and Doongerwadi, a 55-acre property housing a Tower of Silence in the city.

BPP is run by a board of trustees which are elected by more than 25,000 Parsi residents of the city.

There have been a number of trustees through the existence of Bombay Parsi Panchayat. For example, in the year 2008, there were 7 trustees who took charge namely Arnavaz Mistry, Dinshaw Mehta, Jimmy Mistry, Khojeste Mistre, Yazdi Desai, Rustom Tirandaz, and Noshir Dadrawala. There were about 22,000 Parsis who registered to vote that year, whilst only 13,500 exercised their franchise.

== See also ==
- The Zoroastrian Trust Funds of Europe
- The Federation of Zoroastrian Associations of North America
- F. D. Alpaiwalla Museum
