= Rio Cinema (Burnham on Crouch) =

Cinema in Essex, England

Coordinates: 51.6271°N 0.8153°E

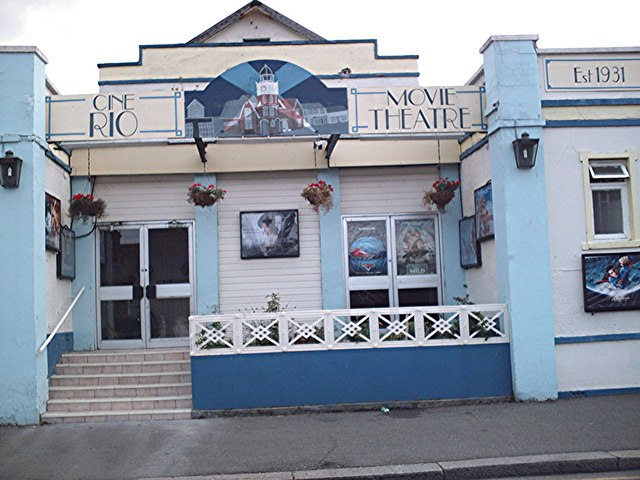
Rio Cinema, Burnham-on-Crouch

The Rio Cinema is a purpose-built, two-screen, 280-seat cinema in Burnham on Crouch, Essex in the United Kingdom. The building dates from 1931. The Burnham Rio is one of the cheapest cinemas in the county.
