= List of schools in Thurrock =

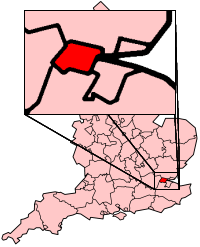

This is a list of schools in Thurrock in the English county of Essex.

== State-funded schools ==
=== Primary schools ===
- Abbots Hall Primary School, Stanford-le-Hope
- Arthur Bugler Primary School, Stanford-le-Hope
- Aveley Primary School, Aveley
- Belmont Castle Academy, Grays
- Benyon Primary School, South Ockendon
- Bonnygate Primary School, South Ockendon
- Bulphan CE Academy, Bulphan
- Chadwell St Mary Primary School, Chadwell St Mary
- Deneholm Primary School, Little Thurrock
- Dilkes Academy, South Ockendon
- East Tilbury Primary School, East Tilbury
- The Gateway Primary Free School, Grays
- Giffards Primary School, Corringham
- Graham James Primary Academy, Corringham
- Harris Primary Academy Chafford Hundred, Chafford Hundred
- Harris Primary Academy Mayflower, Chafford Hundred
- Herringham Primary Academy, Chadwell St Mary
- Holy Cross RC Primary School, South Ockendon
- Horndon-on-the-Hill CE Primary School, Horndon-on-the-Hill
- Kenningtons Primary Academy, Aveley
- Lansdowne Primary Academy, Tilbury
- Little Thurrock Primary School, Little Thurrock
- Orsett CE Primary School, Orsett
- Ortu Corringham Primary School, Corringham
- Purfleet Primary Academy, Purfleet
- Quarry Hill Academy, Grays
- St Joseph's RC Primary School, Stanford-le-Hope
- St Mary's RC Primary School, Tilbury
- St Thomas of Canterbury RC Primary School, Grays
- Shaw Primary Academy, South Ockendon
- Somers Heath Primary School, South Ockendon
- Stanford-le-Hope Primary School, Stanford-le-Hope
- Stifford Clays Primary School, Stifford
- Thameside Primary School, Grays
- Tilbury Pioneer Academy, Tilbury
- Tudor Court Primary School, Chafford Hundred
- Warren Primary School, Chafford Hundred
- West Thurrock Academy, Grays
- Woodside Academy, Little Thurrock

=== Secondary schools ===
- The Gateway Academy, Grays
- Grays Convent High School, Grays
- Harris Academy Chafford Hundred, Chafford Hundred
- Harris Academy Ockendon, South Ockendon
- Harris Academy Riverside, Purfleet
- Hathaway Academy, Grays
- Ormiston Park Academy, Aveley
- Orsett Heath Academy, Grays
- Ortu Gable Hall School, Corringham
- Ortu Hassenbrook Academy, Stanford-le-Hope
- St Clere's School, Stanford-le-Hope
- Thames Park Secondary School, Grays
- William Edwards School, Stifford

=== Special and alternative schools ===
- Beacon Hill Academy, South Ockendon
- Olive AP Academy, Tilbury
- Treetops Free School, Grays
- Treetops School, Grays

=== Further education ===
- South Essex College
- USP College
