= List of schools in the London Borough of Bromley =

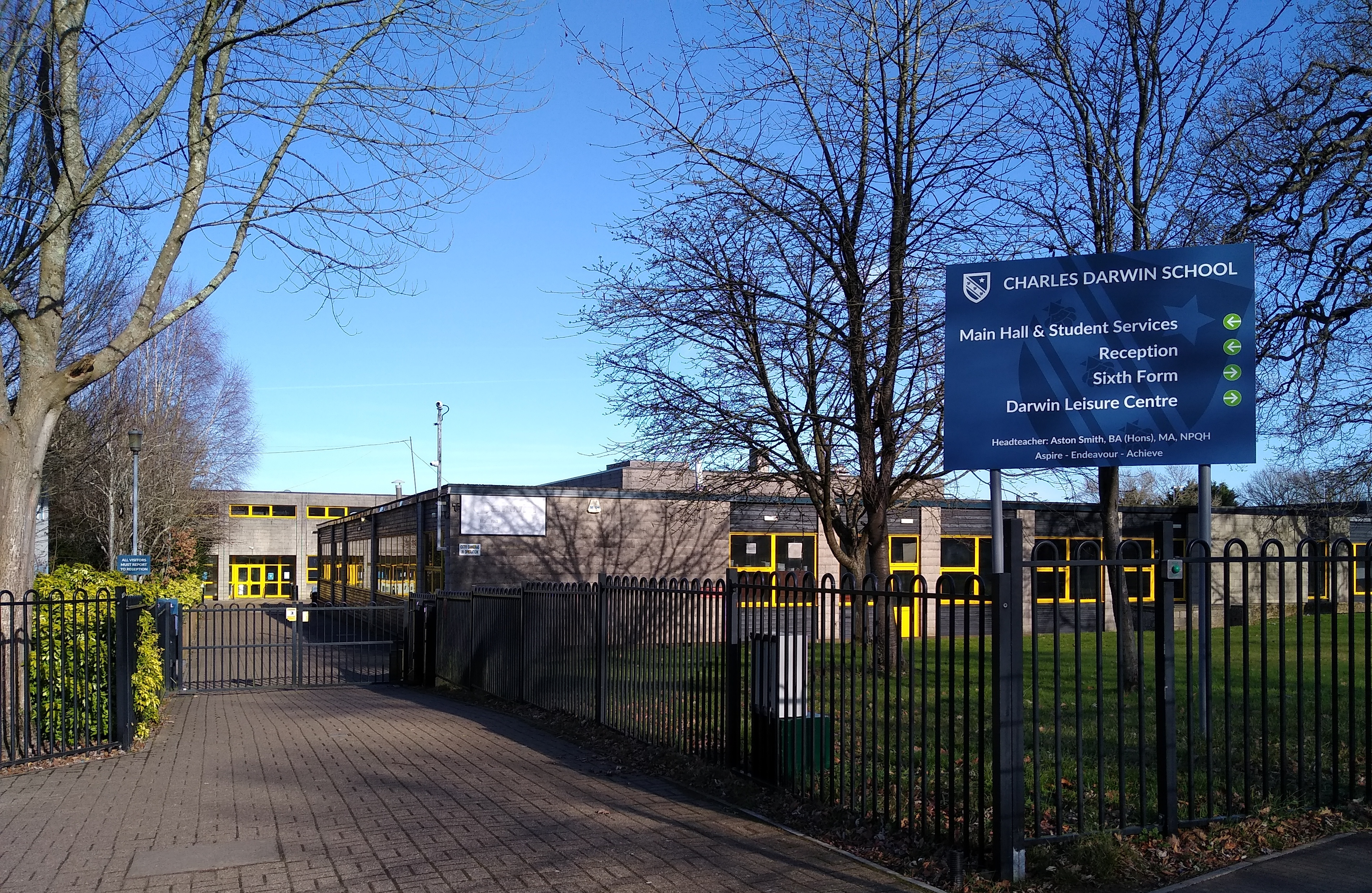
Charles Darwin School

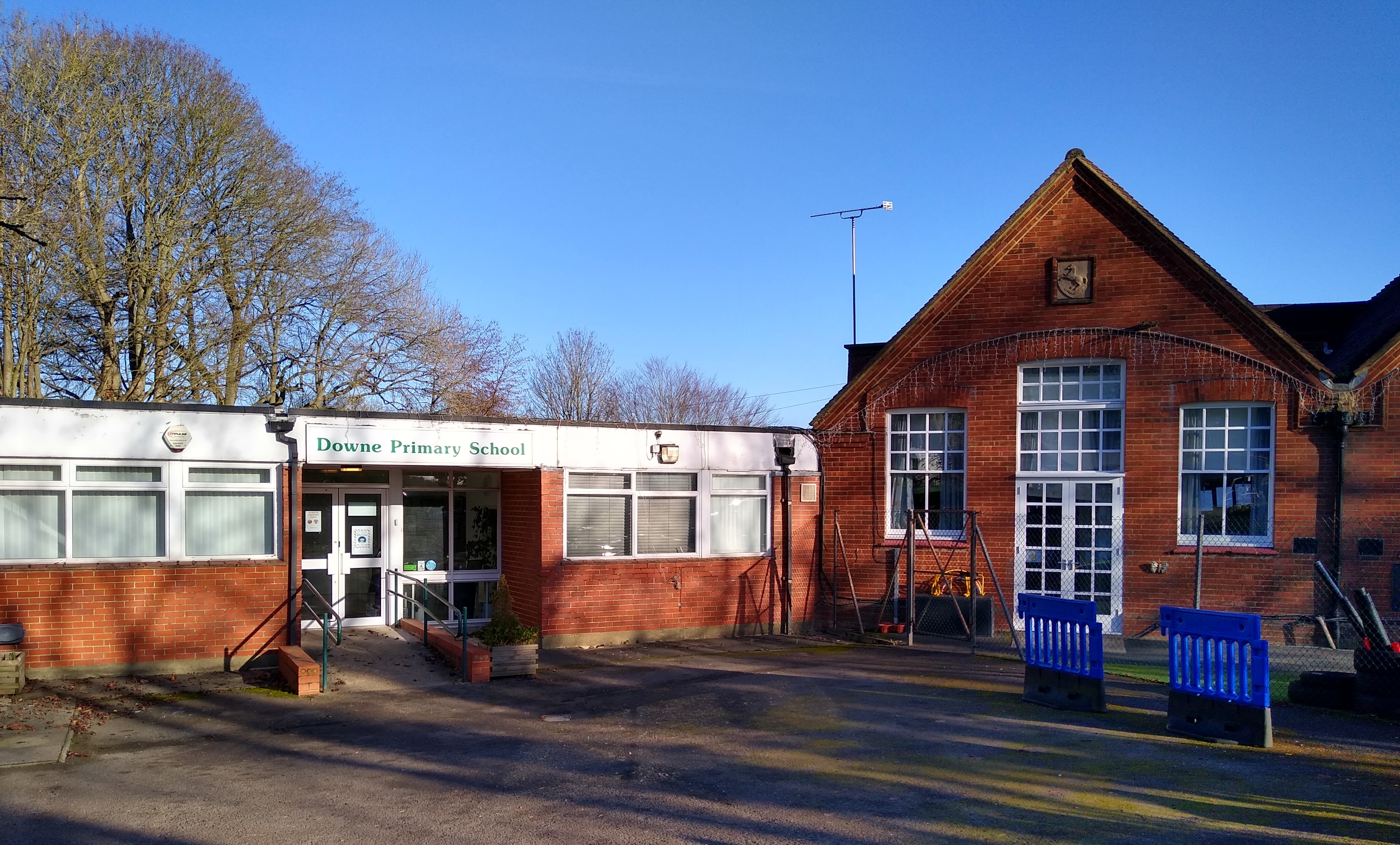
Downe Primary School

This is a list of schools in the London Borough of Bromley, England.

== State-funded schools ==
=== Primary schools ===
Source. (CE indicates Church of England and RC Roman Catholic schools).

- Alexandra Infant School
- Alexandra Junior School
- Balgowan Primary School
- Bickley Primary School
- Biggin Hill Primary School
- Blenheim Primary School
- Burnt Ash Primary School
- Chelsfield Primary School
- Churchfields Primary School
- Clare House Primary School
- Crofton Infant School
- Crofton Junior School
- Cudham Primary School (CE)
- Darrick Wood Infant School
- Darrick Wood Junior School
- Downe Primary School
- Edgebury Primary School
- Elmstead Wood Primary School/ Castlecombe Primary School
- Farnborough Primary School
- Gray's Farm Primary Academy
- Green Street Green Primary School
- Harris Primary Academy Beckenham
- Harris Primary Academy Beckenham Green
- Harris Primary Academy Crystal Palace
- Harris Primary Academy Kent House
- Harris Primary Academy Orpington
- Harris Primary Academy Shortlands
- Hawes Down Primary School
- Hayes Primary School
- Highfield Infants' School
- Highfield Junior School
- The Highway Primary School
- Holy Innocents Primary School (RC)
- James Dixon Primary School
- Keston Primary School (CE)
- La Fontaine Academy
- Langley Park Primary School
- Leesons Primary School
- Manor Oak Primary School
- Marian Vian Primary School
- Mead Road Infant School
- Midfield Primary School
- Mottingham Primary School/ Ravensworth Primary School
- Oak Lodge Primary School
- Oaklands Primary Academy
- Parish Primary School (CE)
- Perry Hall Primary School
- Pickhurst Academy
- Pickhurst Infant Academy
- Poverest Primary School
- Pratts Bottom Primary School
- Raglan Primary School
- Red Hill Primary School
- St Anthony's Primary School (RC)
- St George's Primary School (CE)
- St James' Primary School (RC)
- St John's Primary School (CE)
- St Joseph's Primary School (RC)
- St Mark's Primary School (CE)
- St Mary Cray Primary Academy
- St Mary's Primary School (RC)
- St Nicholas Primary School (CE)
- St Paul's Cray Primary School (CE)
- St Peter and St Paul Primary School (RC)
- St Philomena's Primary School (RC)
- St Vincent's Primary School (RC)
- Scotts Park Primary School
- Southborough Primary School
- Stewart Fleming Primary School
- Trinity Primary School (CE)
- Tubbenden Primary School
- Unicorn Primary School
- Valley Primary School
- Warren Road Primary School
- Wickham Common Primary School
- Worsley Bridge Primary School

=== Secondary schools ===
Source.

- Bishop Justus Church of England School
- Bullers Wood School
- Bullers Wood School for Boys
- Charles Darwin School
- Chislehurst School for Girls
- Coopers School
- Darrick Wood School
- Eden Park High School
- Harris Academy Beckenham
- Harris Academy Bromley
- Harris Academy Orpington
- Hayes School
- Kemnal Technology College
- Langley Park School for Boys
- Langley Park School for Girls
- Ravens Wood School
- Ravensbourne School

=== Grammar schools ===
- Newstead Wood School
- St Olave's and St Saviour's Grammar School

=== Special and alternative schools ===
- Beckmead Park Academy*
- Bromley Beacon Academy
- Bromley Trust Alternative Provision Academy
- Glebe School
- Marjorie McClure School
- Riverside School

*This school is located in Bromley, but is for pupils from Croydon

=== Further education ===
- Bromley College of Further & Higher Education

== Independent schools ==
=== Primary and preparatory schools ===
- Bickley Park School
- Breaside Preparatory School
- St Christopher's The Hall School
- St David's Prep

=== Senior and all-through schools ===
- Babington House School
- Bishop Challoner School (closed 2025)
- Bromley High School
- Darul Uloom London
- Eltham College
- Farringtons School
- Kings London

=== Special and alternative schools ===
- Baston House School
- Browns School
- Clannad Education Centre
- Kent House Hospital School
- TLC The Learning Centre
- The Tutorial Foundation
