= List of schools in the London Borough of Merton =

This is a list of schools in the London Borough of Merton, England.

== State-funded schools ==
=== Primary schools ===
- Abbotsbury Primary School
- All Saints' CE Primary School
- Aragon Primary School
- Beecholme Primary School
- Benedict Academy
- Bishop Gilpin CE Primary School
- Bond Primary School
- Cranmer Primary School
- Dundonald Primary School
- Garfield Primary School
- Gorringe Park Primary School
- Harris Primary Academy Merton * Merton
- Haslemere Primary School
- Hatfeild Primary School
- Hillcross Primary School
- Hollymount School
- Holy Trinity CE Primary School
- Joseph Hood Primary School
- Liberty Primary School
- Links Primary School
- Lonesome Primary School
- Malmesbury Primary School
- Merton Abbey Primary School
- Merton Park Primary School
- Morden Primary School
- Park Academy
- Pelham Primary School
- Poplar Primary School
- The Priory CE School
- Sacred Heart RC Primary School
- St John Fisher RC Primary School
- St Mark's Primary School
- St Mary's RC Primary School
- St Matthew's CE Primary School
- SS Peter and Paul RC Primary School
- St Teresa's RC Primary School
- St Thomas of Canterbury RC Primary School
- The Sherwood School
- Singlegate Primary School
- Stanford Primary School
- West Wimbledon Primary School
- William Morris Primary School
- Wimbledon Chase Primary School
- Wimbledon Park Primary School

=== Secondary schools ===
- Harris Academy Merton
- Harris Academy Morden
- Harris Academy Wimbledon
- Raynes Park High School
- Ricards Lodge High School
- Rutlish School
- St Mark's Academy
- Ursuline High School
- Wimbledon College
- [{Queens Road Secondary School}]

=== Special and alternative schools ===
- Canterbury Campus
- Cricket Green School
- Melrose School
- Perseid School

=== Further education ===
- South Thames College

== Independent schools ==
=== Primary and preparatory schools ===
- Date Valley School
- Donhead Preparatory School
- The London Acorn School
- The Rowans School
- The Study Preparatory School
- Ursuline Preparatory School
- Willington School
- Wimbledon Common Preparatory School

=== Senior and all-through schools ===
- Hall School Wimbledon
- King's College School
- The Norwegian School in London
- Wimbledon High School

=== Special and alternative schools ===
- Blossom House School
- Eagle House School
- Jus'T'Learn
- RISE Education
