= Harris Invictus Academy Croydon =

Location
- 88 London Road; Croydon, Greater London, CR0 2TB; England; 51.380098°N 0.104425°W

Information
- Type: Free school
- Motto: We Know. We Can. We Will.
- Established: September 2014
- Local authority: Croydon London Borough Council
- Trust: Harris Federation
- Department for Education URN: 140952 Tables
- Ofsted: Reports
- Principal: Dougal Scott
- Gender: Mixed
- Age range: 11–18
- Enrolment: 916(2023)
- Capacity: 900
- Website: www.harrisinvictus.org.uk

Harris Invictus Academy Croydon is an 11–18 mixed, free secondary school and sixth form in Croydon, Greater London, England. It was established in September 2014 and is part of the Harris Federation.

== History ==
"I am the master of my fate:

I am the captain of my soul." Invictus, William Ernest Henley (1849–1903).

In 2010, Croydon had three popular Harris Federation academies that had been graded as 'outstanding' and demographic pressure to create a thousand extra secondary school places. Invictus was a local pressure group that teamed up with the Federation to apply to form a free school. Harris Invictus Academy Croydon was established in September 2014. It was rated 'outstanding' by Ofsted in both of its last inspections, which took place in 2016 and 2023.

Harris has identified that children of low income families do better with shorter Key Stage 3, and a three-year exam orientated Key Stage 4, this is spoken of as 'three years to do their GCSE'. Ofsted believes that these students are losing out on the wider Key Stage 3 experience, and warned Harris that schools who used the two plus three method would lose their 'outstanding' status. Harris instructed Invictus Croydon and 26 other secondary academies to switch to the three plus two model in July 2019.

== Curriculum ==
Virtually all maintained schools and academies follow the National Curriculum, and are inspected by Ofsted on how well they succeed in delivering a 'broad and balanced curriculum'. Schools endeavour to get all students to achieve the English Baccalaureate (EBACC) qualification — this must include core subjects, a modern or ancient foreign language, and either history or geography.

Harris Invictus Academy Croydon operates a three-year, Key Stage 3 where all the core National Curriculum subjects are taught. The school chooses to prioritise breadth of curriculum early on, so that students can widen their understanding and appreciation of the world, music, art and science, believing that through broad immersion, students will excel later in formal examinations.

The preparation for GCSE examinations, Key Stage 4 starts in year 10. The students follow a core curriculum of maths, science and English for 6 lessons a week and take four options for 3 lessons a week. One of these options should be Spanish or French, and another history or geography. In addition, there is compulsory RE (PSRE) and a session of sports or physical education (PE). Where appropriate, any subject may be set by ability. Students with English as an additional language will be put in a higher ability set than the raw test mark would suggest, reflecting that limited language might have depressed their score.

== Ofsted ==
The school was inspected by Ofsted on 30 September 2016 and 19 January 2023 and was rated 'outstanding' both times.

In 2023, Ofsted reported that "pupils build very successfully on their learning from previous lessons and previous years. Leaders have given meticulous thought to how pupils should develop knowledge and remember it in the long term. Pupils spoke positively about how well they have been prepared for their next steps."

In 2016, Ofsted said the following: "In two years, senior leaders, staff and governors have built a highly successful school by focusing on the pupils' academic and personal development. The attention to detail results in a very positive climate in which pupils' academic achievement, care and welfare are highly valued and disadvantaged pupils make very strong progress. English as an additional language speakers make very brisk progress and are high achievers."

The inspectors found that pupils behave very well around the school and there is very little disruption in lessons allowing pupils to learn without interruption. They were extremely well turned out and had first-rate manners and have excellent attitudes to learning and to school. In the only criticism in the report they said "the most able pupils are sometimes under-stretched in lessons." They found high expectations, well-structured learning and the effective use of good resources.

== Building ==
Harris Invictus Academy Croydon is on the site of the former Croydon General Hospital whose buildings had been demolished. It lies between the London Road and Lennard Street which is residential. The school opened in 2014, to a single year group, in temporary classrooms to the north of the site, while planning permission was sought. The site was zoned for multiple use so this was a deviation from the local plan. Permission was given in 2015 and the building delivered in 2018.

The contractors Scott Brownrigg were challenged to create a vibrant, secure learning environment with civic qualities and community access. There was a collaborative partnership, with Invictus, a community action group, Harris and Scott Brownrigg. There was significant local pressure for extra school places. The lead architect was Clark Barton.

The site is very constrained. At 9,250 sq m, it is designed as a single superblock, though visually appears in three parts. The community facilities were on the ground floor and the school mainly on the floors above. The building was low cost and is designed to be energy efficient and low maintenance. Vertical brise soleil are a design feature and also a method to reduce thermal gain in summer. Natural light is important, and is channelled through to different areas through internal clear glass glazed walls. Harris had opportunity to define the space it needed for its style of teaching and learning. Access for pupils is from Lennard Road, and access for users of the community facilities from the London Road. Break out spaces are designed in: allowing for better pupil management and a calmer school. The building cost £20 million, and was handed over to the school in 2018.

There are general classrooms, a Main Hall, a Sports Hall, a Dance Studio, an outdoor MUGA, a Dining Hall and Food Tech Preparation Area all of which can be hired by the community when not in use by the school.

== See also ==
- Harris Academy Purley
- Harris Academy South Norwood
- Harris City Academy Crystal Palace
