= Harris Academy Rainham =

Location
- Lambs Lane South; Rainham, Greater London; England
- Coordinates: 51°30′55″N 0°12′15″E

Information
- Type: Academy
- Department for Education URN: 143428 Tables
- Ofsted: Reports
- Head teacher: Gareth Stananought
- Age: 11 to 16
- Enrolment: 1100
- Website: http://www.harrisrainham.org.uk

Harris Academy Rainham (formerly The Chafford School) is a mixed secondary school with academy status located in the London Borough of Havering in Rainham, London, England.

== History ==
In a 2009 Ofsted report, Chafford School was described as a good and improving school and many areas of its work were judged to be outstanding. As a result, it was oversubscribed on an annual basis and Ofsted noted that its popularity was growing.

However, a subsequent Ofsted inspection in June 2015 determined that the school required improvement in all areas.

Following several years of declining results and an adverse Ofsted inspection it was announced at the beginning of 2016 that The Chafford School would join The Harris Federation of Schools in September 2016.

In 2019, Ofsted ranked all areas of the school as good. Ofsted reported that 'leaders have a good understanding of the school's strengths and continually seek to improve the areas that need development."

== Headteachers ==
The current headteacher is G. Stananought. The previous headteacher Gary Pratt took up the post in April 2012 but announced that he was leaving in July 2016. (Gary Pratt was not headteacher of Harris Academy Rainham but rather the Chafford School due to the transition only occurring September 2016.) The executive principal is Nicola Graham. Graham also serves as the executive principal of Harris Academy Riverside and Chafford Hundred.

== Examination results ==
Examination results had been steadily improving for many years up to 2012 and latterly over 65% obtained at least 5 passes at A* to C including English and Mathematics. These figures were well above national and local averages. However, results then began to decline and pass rates significantly dropped to well below the national average in 2013, and similar results were attained in 2014. There was a further decline to 40% in 2015.

== Achievements ==
- Specialist Business and Enterprise status
- Sport England Sportsmark Gold
- School Achievement Awards 2002 and 2003 2003 was the last year this award was made to schools.
- Investor in People Award Gold
