= List of schools in the London Borough of Bexley =

This is a list of schools in the London Borough of Bexley, England.

== State-funded schools ==
=== Primary schools ===
- Barnehurst Infant School
- Barnehurst Junior School
- Barrington Primary School
- Bedonwell Infant School
- Bedonwell Junior School
- Belmont Academy
- Belvedere Infant School
- Belvedere Junior School
- Birkbeck Primary School
- Bishop Ridley CE Primary School
- Brampton Primary Academy
- Burnt Oak Junior School
- Bursted Wood Primary School
- Castilion Primary School
- Chatsworth Infant School
- Christ Church CE Primary School
- Crook Log Primary School
- Danson Primary School
- Days Lane Primary School
- Dulverton Primary School
- East Wickham Primary Academy
- Eastcote Primary Academy
- Foster's Primary School
- Gravel Hill Primary School
- Haberdashers' Crayford Temple Grove
- Haberdashers' Slade Green Temple*
- Harris Garrard Academy
- Hillsgrove Primary School
- Holy Trinity Lamorbey CE Primary School
- Hook Lane Primary School
- Hope Community School
- Hurst Primary School
- Jubilee Primary School
- Lessness Heath Primary School
- Lime Wood Primary School
- Longlands Primary School
- Mayplace Primary School
- Normandy Primary School
- Northumberland Heath Primary School
- Northwood Primary School
- Old Bexley CE Primary School
- Orchard Primary School
- Our Lady of the Rosary RC Primary School
- Parkway Primary School
- Peareswood Primary School
- Pelham Primary School
- Pelham Primary School
- Royal Park Primary Academy
- St Augustine of Canterbury CE Primary School
- St Fidelis RC Primary School
- St John Fisher RC Primary School
- St Joseph's RC Primary School
- St Michael's East Wickham CE Primary School
- St Paulinus CE Primary School
- St Paul's CE Primary School
- St Peter Chanel RC Primary School
- St Stephen's RC Primary School
- St Thomas More RC Primary School
- Sherwood Park Primary School
- Upland Primary School
- Upton Primary School
- Willow Bank Primary School

=== Non-selective secondary schools ===
- Bexleyheath Academy
- Blackfen School for Girls
- Cleeve Park School
- Haberdashers' Crayford Academy
- Harris Academy Falconwood
- Harris Garrard Academy
- Hurstmere School
- St Catherine's Catholic School for Girls
- St Columba's Catholic Boys' School
- Trinity School
- Welling School

=== Bilateral schools ===
- Leigh Academy Bexley

=== Grammar schools ===
- Beths Grammar School (Boys)
- Bexley Grammar School
- Chislehurst and Sidcup Grammar School
- Townley Grammar School (Girls)

=== Special and alternative schools ===
- Aspire Academy Bexley
- Cleeve Meadow School
- Cornerstone School
- Endeavour Academy Bexley
- Horizons Academy Bexley
- Marlborough School
- Shenstone School
- Woodside Academy

=== Further education ===
- Bexley College
- Christ the King: St Mary's

== Independent schools ==
=== Primary and preparatory schools ===
- Benedict House Preparatory School
- Merton Court School
- West Lodge School

=== Special and alternative schools ===
- ADO River Valley
- Break Through
- Park View Academy

=== Further education ===
- Bird College
