= Harris Academy Tottenham =

Location
- Ashley Road; Tottenham Hale, London, N17 9LN; England; 51.59208°N 0.06019°W

Information
- Type: Free school
- Opened: September 2014
- Local authority: Haringey London Borough Council
- Trust: Harris Federation
- Department for Education URN: 140935 Tables
- Ofsted: Reports
- Principal: Nick Soar
- Gender: Mixed
- Age range: 4-19
- Enrolment: 1275(2023)
- Capacity: 1570
- Website: www.harristottenham.org.uk

Harris Academy Tottenham (HATO) is a coeducational all-through school located in Tottenham Hale in London. Part of the Harris Federation multi-academy trust, it opened to pupils in September 2014. The school was rated outstanding by Ofsted in both 2017 and 2023.

== Description ==
The school is part of the Harris Federation; it opened in September 2014 and initially operated from Chobham Academy, another of the Harris Federation schools in Stratford, East London. The school relocated to its new site a year later, into pre-used buildings. The full conversion and an additional teaching block were completed for the 2017/18 academic year. The school’s site has undergone complete refurbishment; it shares its dance studio and sports fields with the public when not in school use.

== Curriculum ==
The academy has designed its curriculum collectively calling heavily on Dylan William's education research.

=== Primary Education ===
The primary phase benefits from some specialist teaching from teachers from the secondary sector especially in year 6, where subject teaching is introduced.

=== Key Stage 3 ===
Virtually all maintained schools and academies follow the National Curriculum, and are inspected by Ofsted on how well they succeed in delivering a 'broad and balanced curriculum'. Schools endeavour to get all students to achieve the English Baccalaureate(EBACC) qualification – this must include core subjects, a modern or ancient foreign language, and either History or Geography.

Harris Academy Tottenham operates a three-year Key Stage 3 where all the core National Curriculum subjects are taught.

=== Key Stage 4 ===
In Key Stage 4, all students do the EBacc core subjects (with Maths and Science at different levels judged by ability), and certain options: Classics, Performing Arts, Music, Art, Design Technology, Food Tech, Exam PE and Computer Science.

=== Key Stage 5 ===
Entry to the sixth form is dependent on 7 GCSE passes, and the intention to achieve 3 or more 'A' levels.

== Compliance ==
The academy publishes all the statutory information on its website .

== Controversy ==
In September 2020, Lawrence Foley became Executive Principal of the Academy, implementing a "zero-tolerance" approach to discipline. Within the first month of his tenure, three black students were permanently excluded triggering backlash from some in the school community.

A petition on change.org, which called for Foley's immediate resignation and accused him of discriminating against black students, was raised by Joshua Adusei, a PE teacher. The petition claimed that the exclusion of the three students was racist, and the changes made by Foley to the discipline policy disproportionately affected students from Afro-Caribbean backgrounds. It was also alleged that he had been harassing members of staff through a school restructuring plan. The petition gained widespread social media attention and amassed nearly 6,000 signatures within a week. One comment on the petition claimed the school was ''run by white people... who don’t understand the children'' while another compared its policies to ''Putin’s Russia''.

Lawrence Foley, HATO's Senior Leadership Team, and the wider Harris Federation vehemently denied all allegations, with the Federation branding it a "misleading, vindictive, and vexatious campaign". In the wake of the events, Foley received four death threats. Additionally, a threat was made, via the comments section of the petition, towards HATO staff, with the perpetrator, who is thought to be a student at the academy, threatening to "stab" them. All threats were reported to the police and the comments section below the petition was removed as a preventative measure. Adusei called the removal of the petition's comment section a ''taking away of free speech''.

Opinion is largely divided over the scandal, with many accepting (or corroborating) the claims laid out in the petition and speaking of a deep-seated culture of institutional racism within academies and schools like HATO, which is proving detrimental to the growth and development of young black students. However, several others have dismissed the allegations as unsubstantiated and criticised Adusei for wrongfully subjecting the academy, and a teacher, to an infamous 'trial by social media'. They also highlight the potentially dangerous ramifications of such actions as evidenced by Foley receiving death threats. It was later revealed that one of the permanently excluded students had ''punched a teacher''.

In a statement, a spokesperson for the Federation said that they "fully reject all of the allegations made by Mr Adusei." The statement continues to say that "He (Mr Adusei) has used online platforms to conduct a misleading, vindictive and vexatious campaign in order to defame his colleagues and destabilise his school. It is concerning to us, as it will be to teachers and school leaders everywhere, that he cannot be challenged on an equal footing because GDPR and his rights as an employee protect him from being challenged on his allegations, his motivations and the facts of the situation disclosed.” The spokesperson added that the content in the petition was “demonstrably untrue”, but said they were “reluctant to divert time and resources” from their children to provide the proceedings required to remove the petition from Change.org." The petition was later closed by Adusei.

Adusei was initially suspended and later dismissed from his position. After inspection in January 2023, Harris Academy Tottenham retained its outstanding rating by Ofsted, first given in 2017. In 2025, he was indefinitely banned from teaching.

== See also ==
- Pimlico Academy
- Batley Grammar School
