= Harris Academy Peckham =

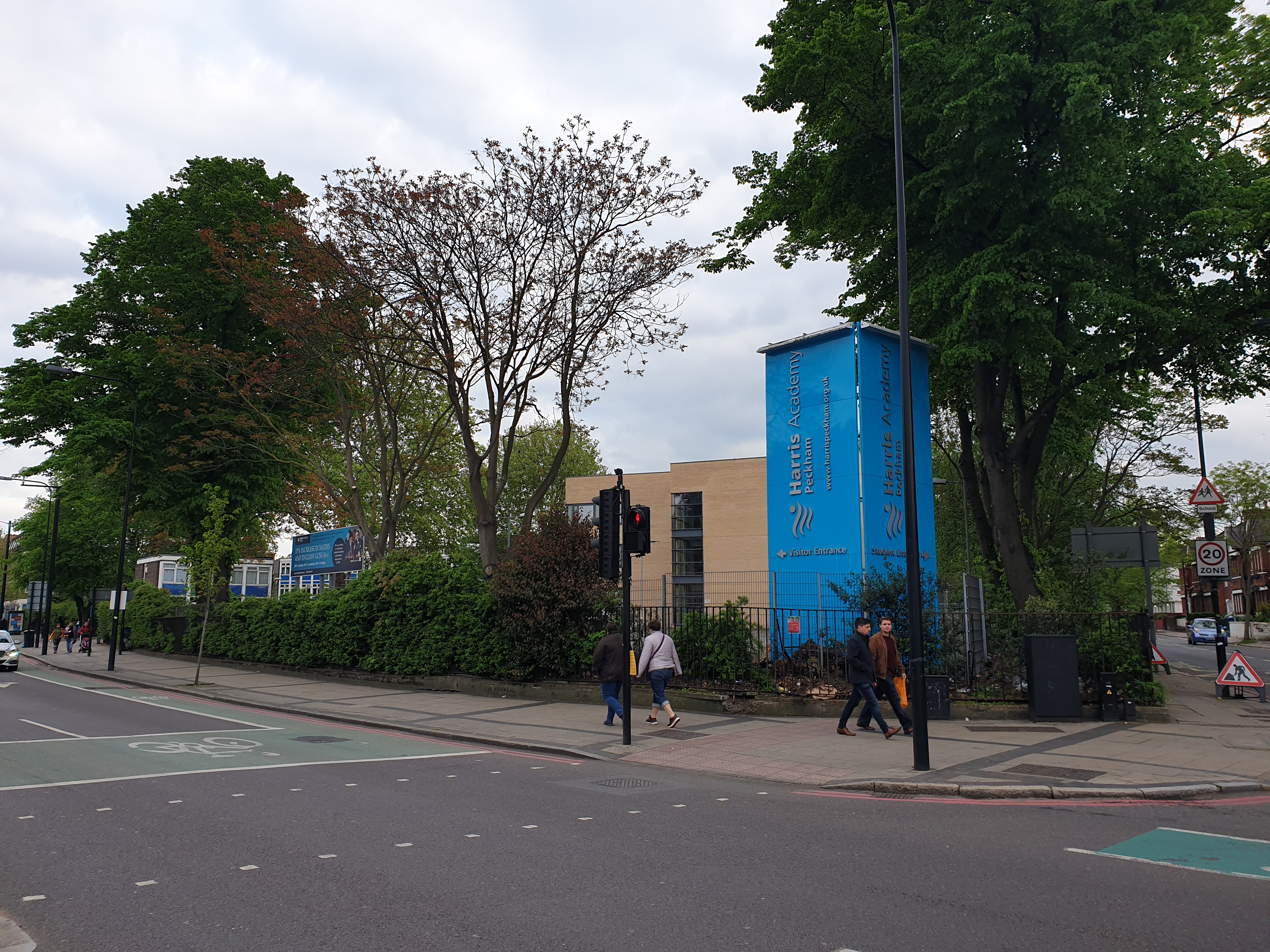

Location
- 112 Peckham Road; Peckham, London, SE15 5DZ; England
- 51°28′22″N 0°04′27″W

Information
- Type: Academy
- Motto: Per aspera ad astra ("To the stars through difficulty")
- Established: 2003
- Local authority: London Borough of Southwark
- Specialist: Business & Enterprise, ICT, Performing Arts
- Department for Education URN: 134225 Tables
- Ofsted: Reports
- Principal: Claudette Bergin
- Gender: Coeducational
- Age: 11 to 16
- Houses: Red; Blue; Yellow; Green; Academy College
- Colours: Navy Blue & Light Blue
- Website: http://www.harrispeckham.org.uk

Harris Academy Peckham (also known as the Academy at Peckham and Peckham Academy) is a coeducational academy in Peckham, in the London Borough of Southwark. Catering for pupils from the ages of 11 to 16, the school specialises in the curriculum areas of Business and Enterprise, ICT, and the Performing Arts.

The school was formerly named Warwick Park, but unsatisfactory test results and constant pupil misconduct led to its being given an overhaul and renamed The Academy at Peckham. The buildings were refurbished and the school was given better resources. After this, the school gradually began to improve. In 2007, the school was renamed again, to become The Harris Academy at Peckham (now Harris Academy Peckham) following the receipt of funding from Lord Harris of Peckham. This also resulted in a change of the school logo and uniform to reflect its place in the Harris Federation. This switchover occurred in late 2013.

An Ofsted report on the school, issued in September 2009, claimed that the school was "good" and was "improving rapidly". Catherine Loxton was instated as permanent principal of the school in October 2009. From the Autumn term of 2013 Mr Rob Hunter, coming from Harris Academy Merton, took over the role of principal. The current Principal is now Claudette Bergin, she secured the position in 2020. The school was rated 'good' by Ofsted in 2019. The school was rated 'outstanding' by Ofsted in 2025.

== Curriculum ==
The school offers a range of subjects. The compulsory subjects are as follows:

Years 7-9	Years 10-11
English	English
Maths	Maths
Sciences	Sciences
Citizenship	Optional
P.E	P.E
Geography	Optional
Design Technology/ Food Technology	Optional
Art	Optional
Music	Optional
History	Optional
ICT	Optional
Performing Arts	Optional
Modern Foreign Languages	Optional
Religious Studies	Optional

Students are asked to choose their GCSE subjects at the end of Year 9. They must choose two GCSE courses and one BTEC course. The choices are as follows:

BTEC	GCSE
Business and Enterprise	History
Music	Geography
Hospitality and Catering	Art
Hairdressing	Modern Foreign Languages
Performing Arts	ICT
Business and Enterprise	Design Technology
Business and Enterprise	Religious Studies

However, students who excel at their studies are often entered for GCSE exams one to two years early, and are allowed to take extra GCSE courses as an extra-curricular activity.

== Music and drama ==
The school has a music and drama department, puts theatrical performances, including an annual school performance and occasional performances at other venues (including the Royal Opera House). The drama department also has connections with Peckham Shed. There is also an annual musical soiree held and organised by music students.

== Sports ==
The school has many sports teams, including its own teams for football, basketball, rugby, badminton, and cricket. Many students also belong to local sports teams. The school also has a team of cheerleaders, who perform at the annual Harris Federation Sports Day and at other major sporting events.

== See also ==
- Harris Federation
