= Norma Major =

English philanthropist and wife of former British Prime Minister John Major

Dame Norma Major DBE
- Born: Norma Christina Elizabeth Wagstaff; 12 February 1942 (age 84); Shropshire, England
- Education: London South Bank University
- Occupations: Dressmaker; philanthropist; writer; biographer
- Political party: Conservative
- Spouse: Sir John Major (m. 1970)
- Children: 2

Dame Norma Major DBE (née Norma Christina Elizabeth Wagstaff, formerly Johnson; born 12 February 1942) is an English philanthropist who is married to former British prime minister Sir John Major.

== Early life ==
Norma Christina Elizabeth Wagstaff was born the daughter of Norman Reuel Wagstaff, a Lieutenant in the Royal Artillery, and Edith Georgina Wagstaff (née Johnson), a former umbrella saleswoman. She was born in Shropshire while her father was stationed there during World War II. He was killed in a motorcycle accident a few days after the end of the Second World War, when Norma was just three years old, and her mother subsequently reverted to using her maiden name after becoming estranged from her in-laws, so she was known as Norma Johnson growing up.

Major was educated at a boarding school in Bexhill-on-Sea, Oakfield Preparatory School in Dulwich, and Peckham School for Girls, where she was head girl. She left the school with seven O-levels, two A-levels, and a place on a teacher training course. She was also a skilled dressmaker and a member of the Young Conservatives.

== Marriage ==
At a Conservative Party meeting during the campaign for the 1970 Greater London Council elections, she was introduced to John Major. The couple married on 3 October 1970. They have a son together, James Major, and a daughter, Elizabeth Major. She kept a low profile during her husband's premiership (1990–1997), doing charity work and writing two books, Joan Sutherland: The Authorised Biography (1994) and Chequers: The Prime Minister's Country House and its History (1997).

Following the release of the Diaries (1987-1992), of Edwina Currie, (released in 2002) a former junior minister in the Thatcher government at the same time as her husband's tenure as Chief Secretary to the Treasury, it was revealed to the public that the Majors had experienced a period of infidelity, as there had been a workplace relationship between Major and Currie whilst both were married. It was later clarified that Norma had known of the affair long before the release of the book.

== Charity work ==
In June 1999, Major was created a Dame Commander of the Order of the British Empire (DBE) in the 1999 Birthday Honours, in recognition of her charity work. Major is a supporter of Mencap, and she has been credited with helping to raise £6,000,000 for the charity.

Unofficial roles
Preceded by Denis Thatcher	Spouse of the Prime Minister of the United Kingdom; 1990–1997	Succeeded by Cherie Blair
