= PEMBEC High School =

Location
- Montrose Avenue; Wigan, Greater Manchester, WN5 9XL; England
- Coordinates: 53.5438°N 2.6761°W

Information
- Type: Secondary School
- Closed: 2011
- Local authority: Wigan
- Specialist: Business and Enterprise College
- Department for Education URN: 106520 Tables
- Ofsted: Reports
- Gender: Coeducational
- Age: 11 to 16
- Houses: Enterprise, Mill, Barge, Land, Coilery
- Colours: Blue and Green
- Website: http://www.pembec.wigan.sch.uk/index.htm

PEMBEC High School (Pemberton Business and Enterprise College) was a state school in the Pemberton district of Wigan, Greater Manchester, with Business and Enterprise College status.

The school had a "Gifted and Talented" programme that had given it its highest number of pupils with A and A*s at GCSE.

PEMBEC was closed in August 2011, and the site was re-named 'Central Park'. Ran by the Wigan Warriors rugby league club, Central Park offered vocational training and further education programmes for 14-19-year-olds. The provision also offered extensive facilities to be used by the local community as well as new headquarters for the club, a sophisticated base for the Warriors' Community and Foundation operations and a Centre of Excellence for the highly reputed Wigan Warriors' Youth Development Programme.

In 2023, Wigan Council began to demolish the site, with plans to use the site to create a new home for Hope School, a SEND school currently based in Kelvin Grove, Wigan.
