= Battersea Park (disambiguation) =

Battersea Park refers to the park in London, England. It may also refer to:

== Railway stations ==
- Battersea Park railway station, a railway station near the park
- Battersea Park Road railway station, a railway station that closed in 1916
- Battersea Park railway station (1860–1870), a closed railway station near the park

== Disasters ==
- Battersea Park rail crash, a 1937 railway crash near the park in which 10 people died
- Battersea Park funfair disaster, a 1972 roller coaster disaster in the park that resulted in 5 deaths and 13 injuries

== Other uses ==
- Battersea Park (ward), an electoral division
- Battersea Park Street Circuit, a former motor racing circuit
- Battersea Park School, former name of Harris Academy Battersea
