= Harris Academy Orpington =

Location
- Tintagel Road; Orpington, Greater London, BR5 4LG; England; 51.3758°N 0.1148°E

Information
- Type: Academy
- Motto: Together, We Can
- Established: 1990; 36 years ago (as The Priory School); September 2016; 10 years ago (as Harris Academy Orpington)
- Department for Education URN: 143427 Tables
- Ofsted: Reports
- Gender: Coeducational
- Age: 11 to 18
- Website: http://www.harrisorpington.org.uk/

Harris Academy Orpington (formerly The Priory School) is a non-selective secondary school and sixth form with academy status in Orpington in the London Borough of Bromley which joined the Harris Federation in September 2016.

== History ==
In 2006 its predecessor The Priory School gained specialist sports college status, focusing efforts on sports and the community; it was the only school in the borough to have this status. The school converted to academy status in May 2012. An Ofsted report carried out in March 2016 rated The Priory School as ‘inadequate’, in September 2016 and re-named Harris Academy Orpington.

In 2019 numerous Harris Academies were accused of 'gaming' the system through the practice of entering entire cohorts for the ESOL qualification, which is aimed at students who have English as an additional language (EAL), Harris Orpington entered their Year 11 cohort. This was shown to be common practice across the Federation.

However, a spokesperson for Harris said the schools were 'categorically not gaming the system'. 'Gaming would only occur if a school systemically entered for ESOL to fill an open bucket space which would not otherwise be filled, for students who didn't need this course because they were not EAL'. The spokesperson added that ESOL literacy skills were a 'useful preparation for English exams', giving students real-exam experience before GCSEs.

== Academics ==
Academics

Virtually all maintained schools and academies follow the National Curriculum, and are inspected by Ofsted on how well they succeed in delivering a 'broad and balanced curriculum'. Schools endeavour to get all students to achieve the English Baccalaureate (EBACC) qualification- this must include core subjects a modern foreign language, and either History or Geography. Students explore as many subjects as possible at Key Stage 3 before specialising at Key Stages 4 and 5. To achieve this, students study French or Spanish and humanities subjects such as Art, Drama, Photography or Criminology in Key Stage 3.

Students are guided in their year 9 option choice of GCSEs and A-level allowing for Russell Group university ambitions, another universities or for entering into employment or training. A co-curricular enrichment programme is provided. As of 2020 there is an obligation to teach British values; this is done through tutor programme (which explore current events in the world), enrichment activities, charity events and external speakers.

Key Stage 3 curriculum

The Key Stage 3 curriculum runs from Years 7-9. The current curriculum gives appropriate time to Mathematics, English and Science. Literacy and numeracy skills are developed in every subject and across the curriculum.

All students in Year 7, 8 and 9 study a language which they continue to study until GCSE. Students may pick up a second, additional language in Year 10.

Key Stage 4 curriculum

The Key Stage 4 curriculum is followed by Years 10 and 11. All students will study Mathematics, English, Science, PE and Religious Education and to obtain a EBacc they are advised to study a humanities subject and a modern foreign language. They choose two further options from an extensive list.

== Harris Federation ==
Harris Academy Orpington is part of the Harris Federation, a not-for-profit charity that runs 52 primary and secondary academies in London and Essex, including Harris Academy Beckenham, and Harris Academy Bromley.

Three quarters of Harris secondary academies inspected have been rated ‘outstanding’ by Ofsted, with the remaining quarter judged to be ‘good’ - an unmatched track record. Education charity The Sutton Trust has produced successive reports concluding that the Harris Federation is among the top academy trusts for improving the prospects of disadvantaged students. Harris Academy has places in year 7 for 180 students each year. Admissions are made via the Bromley Secondary Schools Admissions form.
