= Harris Academy Bermondsey =

Location
- 55 Southwark Park Road; Bermondsey, London, SE16 3TZ; England; 51°29′36″N 0°04′15″W

Information
- Type: Academy
- Established: 2006
- Local authority: London Borough of Southwark
- Specialist: Enterprise & Media
- Department for Education URN: 131747 Tables
- Ofsted: Reports
- Principal: Gizle Landman
- Gender: Girls
- Age: 11 to 18
- Enrolment: 900
- Website: http://www.harrisbermondsey.org.uk/

Harris Academy Bermondsey is a secondary school located in the district of Bermondsey in the London Borough of Southwark, England. The school takes in girls between the ages of 11 and 18. In 2006 the school joined a federation of schools in South London called the Harris Federation named after the Lord Harris of Peckham who is sponsoring them. Prior to its transformation into an academy, the school was known as Aylwin Girls' School. The 'Aylwin Grammar School for Girls' was founded on the site in 1906, and was one of the first offering a free grammar school education to girls in the country. The school also takes part in fundraising for annual trips to Sri Lanka in association with the Yala Fund, a charity which helps build and improve schools in towns in Sri Lanka.

== Location ==
The academy is located on the A2206, on Southwark Park Road. The nearest train station is South Bermondsey, which is on the South London Line and connects to Peckham and Crystal Palace, with a new station, New Bermondsey, possible on the proposed London Overground East London Line connecting to Clapham Junction. The nearest tube station, Bermondsey on the Jubilee line, is located on Jamaica Road.

== Student clubs ==
Harris Academy Bermondsey has a lineup of clubs that mainly focus on media and enterprise, but also include other subject areas.

== Harris Federation ==
The Harris Federation runs 52 primary and secondary academies in London and Essex. There are fourteen schools in the federation, with plans for more. The schools are all sponsored by the Lord Harris of Peckham, who is investing around £2 million into them to make new facilities and for re-development of certain schools.
