= Harris Academy Greenwich =

Location
- Middle Park Avenue; Eltham, Greater London, SE9 5EQ; England
- 51.45142°N 0.03902°E

Information
- Type: Academy
- Trust: Harris Federation
- Department for Education URN: 138449 Tables
- Ofsted: Reports
- Principal: Jack Docherty
- Executive Principal: George McMillan
- Gender: Coeducational
- Age: 11 to 18
- Website: www.harrisgreenwich.org.uk

Harris Academy Greenwich (formerly Eltham Foundation School) is a coeducational secondary school and sixth form with academy status, located in the Eltham area of the Royal Borough of Greenwich in London, England. The Academy was rated 'outstanding' by Ofsted in 2022.

== History ==
Eltham Foundation School was converted to an academy status in September 2012 under the sponsorship of the Harris Federation and was renamed Harris Academy Greenwich. Previously it had been a foundation school controlled by Greenwich London Borough Council. The school continues to coordinate with Greenwich London Borough Council for admissions.

== Philosophy ==
Virtually all maintained schools and academies follow the National Curriculum, and are inspected by Ofsted on how well they succeed in delivering a 'broad and balanced curriculum'. Schools endeavour to get all students to achieve the English Baccalaureate(EBACC) qualification- this must include core subjects a modern or ancient foreign language, and either History or Geography.

Harris Academy Greenwich operates a three-year, Key Stage 3 where all the core National Curriculum subjects are taught. The school chooses to prioritise breadth of curriculum early on, so that students can widen their understanding and appreciation of the world, music, art and science, believing that through broad immersion, students will excel later in formal examinations. Later interactions with the world will be more fulfilling and successful.

== Curriculum ==
Harris Academy Greenwich offers GCSEs and BTECs as programmes of study for pupils in Key Stage 4. In Year 10, students study a core of English, Maths, Science, History or Geography and a foreign language yet are able to shape their own curriculum by choosing from a wide range of GCSE options.

Students in the sixth form have the option of studying from a range of A Levels as well as further BTECs. Some sixth form courses are offered in conjunction with Harris Academy Falconwood. The school has specialisms in sport, enterprise and communication, and has additional resources for the specialisms.
