= Harris Federation =

Group of schools around London, UK

Coordinates: 51.4003°N 0.0755°W

- Established: 2007
- Type: Multi Academy Trust
- Location: Norfolk House, Wellesley Road, Croydon. CR0 1LH
- Key people: Philip Harris (Lord Harris of Peckham), Sir Daniel Moynihan
- Website: https://www.harrisfederation.org.uk/

Harris Federation is a multi-academy trust of 59 primary and secondary academies in and around London. They are sponsored by Philip Harris (Lord Harris of Peckham).

== Description ==
With 59 academies in London and Essex, the Harris Federation educates around 44,000 children, which is about 1 in 40 London children, and employs 5,000 staff. Through its "Train to Teach Programme", it provides initial teacher training and inset for teachers from London and the South East.

The sponsor is Philip Harris (Lord Harris of Peckham) who was the former chairman and chief executive of Carpetright. The federation is a not-for-profit charitable organisation.

The chief executive officer is Sir Daniel Moynihan, a former principal of the Harris City Academy Crystal Palace. The Harris Federation headquarters are in East Croydon.

== Schools ==
=== Nursery ===
- Harris Nursery Hub Peckham, Southwark

=== Primary schools ===
- Harris Primary Academy Beckenham, Beckenham
- Harris Primary Academy Beckenham Green, Beckenham
- Harris Primary Academy Benson, Shirley
- Harris Junior Academy Carshalton, Carshalton
- Harris Primary Academy Chafford Hundred, Chafford Hundred
- Chobham Academy East Village
- Harris Primary Academy Coleraine Park, Tottenham
- Harris Primary Academy Crystal Palace, Penge
- Harris Primary Academy East Dulwich, East Dulwich
- Harris Garrard Academy Bexley
- Harris Primary Academy Haling Park, South Croydon
- Harris Primary Academy Kenley, Kenley
- Harris Primary Academy Kent House, Penge
- Harris Primary Academy Mayflower, Chafford Hundred
- Harris Primary Academy Merton, Mitcham
- Harris Primary Academy Orpington, Orpington
- Harris Primary Free School Peckham, Peckham
- Harris Primary Academy Peckham Park, Peckham
- Harris Primary Academy Philip Lane, Tottenham
- Harris Primary Academy Shortlands, Shortlands
- Harris Academy Tottenham Tottenham
- Harris Primary Academy South Kenton, Wembley

=== Secondary schools ===
- Harris Aspire Academy Croydon
- Harris Avery Hill (opening 2026)
- Harris Academy Battersea, Battersea
- Harris Academy Beckenham, Beckenham
- Harris Academy Bermondsey, Bermondsey
- Harris Academy Beulah Hill, Upper Norwood
- Harris Academy Bromley, Beckenham
- Harris Academy Chafford Hundred, Chafford Hundred
- Chobham Academy East Village
- Harris Academy Clapham, Clapham
- Harris Invictus Academy Croydon, Croydon
- Harris City Academy Crystal Palace, Upper Norwood, Croydon
- Harris Boys' Academy East Dulwich, Peckham
- Harris Girls' Academy East Dulwich, East Dulwich
- Harris Science Academy East London, Newham and Tower Hamlets
- Harris Academy Falconwood, Falconwood
- Harris Garrard Academy Bexley
- Harris Academy Greenwich, Eltham
- Harris Academy Merton, Mitcham
- Harris Academy Morden, Morden
- Harris Academy Wimbledon, Wimbledon
- Harris Academy Orpington, Orpington
- Harris Academy Peckham, Peckham
- Harris Academy Purley, South Croydon
- Harris Academy South Norwood, South Norwood
- Harris Academy St John's Wood Marlborough Hill
- Harris Academy Riverside, Purfleet
- Harris Academy Sutton, Sutton
- Harris Academy Tottenham Tottenham
- Harris Academy Rainham, Rainham, London
- Harris Academy Ockendon, South Ockendon

=== All-through schools ===
- Chobham Academy, East Village
- Harris Garrard Academy Bexley
- Harris Academy Tottenham, Tottenham Hale

=== Sixth forms ===
- Harris Academy Battersea
- Harris Academy Beckenham
- Harris Academy Bermondsey
- Harris Academy Bromley
- Harris Academy Chafford Hundred
- Harris Clapham Sixth Form
- Chobham Academy
- Harris City Academy Crystal Palace
- Harris Invictus Academy Croydon
- Harris Invictus Sixth Form, Croydon
- Harris Boys Academy East Dulwich
- Harris Girls Academy East Dulwich
- Harris Academy Falconwood
- Harris Garrard Academy
- Harris Academy Greenwich
- Harris Academy Merton
- Harris Merton Sixth Form, Mitcham
- Harris Academy Orpington
- Harris Professional Skills Sixth Form, Croydon
- Harris Academy Rainham
- Harris Academy South Norwood
- Harris Academy Tottenham
- Harris Westminster Sixth Form, Westminster

=== Pupil referral units ===
- Harris Aspire Academy, Beckenham

== Results ==
In 2016, the Department for Education recognised the Harris Federation as a "top performer" in primary and secondary education, when comparing the performance of different multi-academy trusts. In July 2016, researchers at the Education Policy Institute found that "at primary level the Harris Federation is the highest performing school group in England – the improvement it has made is equivalent to pupils making around one and a half times more progress than average".

In 2017, the Harris Federation was recognised by government league tables as being the top performing multi-academy trust (MAT) in England. Commenting on the new performance data, Schools Standards Minister, Nick Gibb, said that the Harris Federation is "leading the way" in delivering excellent results for its pupils.

In 2018, the Department for Education published a league table comparing the performance of all multi-academy trusts. The Harris Federation was ranked the top performing large trust for the progress made by its pupils and for the progress made by its disadvantaged pupils.

== Social mobility ==
In 2014, 2015, 2016, 2017 and 2018 research by the Sutton Trust found that the Harris Federation was among "The best academy chains (for) having a transformational impact on pupils’ life chances".

The Harris Federation runs a cultural enrichment programme that aims to improve outcomes for their brightest students, with activities run with organisations such as LAMDA, the Royal Opera House and Christie's. In summer 2018, the musician Stormzy, who attended a Harris Academy, returned to his old school to launch a scholarship scheme for black students at Cambridge university.

In 2014, the Harris Federation and Westminster School opened the Harris Westminster Sixth Form. The aim of the sixth form, which received 1,000 applications for 250 places, is to help students from London's state schools access top universities. In 2021, 36 students from the sixth form won places at Oxford and Cambridge universities.

In 2019, the Harris Federation opened the first completely free nursery in England. With 55 hours of free childcare per week for 51 weeks of the year for children from economically disadvantaged backgrounds, the Federation said it "had been compelled to provide early years places to the most needy children because they miss out under the existing rules on free nursery places."

Harris Federation academies are the top school for progress in five of the nine boroughs in which the Federation operates and three Harris academies – Harris Academy Battersea, Harris Academy Morden and Harris Academy Bromley – are in the top 1% of schools in the country for pupil progress.

The Harris Federation is the highest performing MAT in the country for pupil progress and EBACC qualifications for disadvantaged students.

In 2018, Harris Academy Battersea received an "Outstanding" rating from Ofsted. Previously known as Battersea Park School and Battersea Technology College, the school became a Harris Academy in 2014 after it was branded inadequate. In one year at the previous school, no pupils gained five or more GCSE passes. In 2003 three percent of children left with five A*-C GCSEs and in 2017 this figure was 83%. The school is now oversubscribed and the percentage of students applying to Russell Group universities has greatly increased. Ofsted said that teachers were proud to work at the academy, that morale was high and pupils of all abilities make "very strong progress".

In 2021, Will.i.am visited Harris City Academy Crystal Palace to film The Blackprint a TV documentary exploring what it means to be black and British. Describing the school as a “a place of black excellence”, he made a donation in order to fund new opportunities for students to study robotics.

== Teacher housing ==
In 2016, concerned that teachers were being priced out of London because of the cost of accommodation, the Harris Federation launched a campaign for academy trusts to be able to turn unused land on their school sites into affordable housing for teachers.

== Ransomware attack ==
On 27 March 2021, the federation was attacked by the ransomware gang REvil, which published multiple financial documents of the federation to its blog. As a result, the IT systems of the federation were shut down for some weeks, which had been compromised in the attack, thus disabling 37,000 students' email. This lasted for about 4 months.

== Controversies ==
Some of the schools within the federation were formerly run by local authorities, and forced by central government to become academies as part of the Harris Federation against the wishes of 94% of the parents and boards of governors. There was national media coverage over Downhills Primary School (now Harris Primary Academy Philip Lane), where it was reported that 94% of parents opposed the change to academy status. At the time, the government said it had decided to close Downhills Primary School and re-open it as a Harris Academy because of "chronic underperformance" at Downhills. According to national news reports, standards of education at Harris Primary Academy Philip Lane quickly improved with the Federation's involvement. Having been in special measures before becoming a Harris academy, its first inspection report after opening found that it was now good with outstanding features.

Reacting to the news that the Harris Primary Academy Philip Lane in the heart of Tottenham, had been unduly helping their pupils in their Key Stage 2 Sats tests, anti-academies campaigner Fiona Millar said "I’ve scrutinised their data and wondered how they get these results with similar cohorts of pupils. Increasingly we see they do it by this unethical behaviour. " Year 6 pupils were given too much help in their English reading and maths reasoning Sats, according to the Standards and Testing Agency (STA). Thus, pupils’ scores in those papers have been expunged and they will receive scores only for their spelling, punctuation and grammar tests. In a letter sent to parents on Monday, 6 August 2018, the academy's chair of governors, described the investigation findings as “deeply regrettable and disappointing”. However, the school was inspected by Ofsted after this and rated Outstanding, with the schools inspectorate judging that "The academy trust worked swiftly to investigate the maladministration of standardised tests and took appropriate disciplinary action. They have ably managed the school by brokering highly skilled leaders to provide the school with renewed focus and direction."

In 2018, the second primary school run by this academy chain had SATs results annulled. The Standards and Testing Agency cancelled some of the results of former year six pupils at Harris Primary Academy Kent House over fears of “maladministration”. In 2013 Roke Primary School joined the Harris Federation, against the wishes of some parents and governors who did not want to have academy status. Now known as Harris Primary Academy Kenley, the academy has since been judged "outstanding" by Ofsted. As part of a local awards scheme, the Principal of the academy was nominated as a 'Croydon Hero' because of the improvements that took place.

The Harris Westminster Sixth Form, which was scheduled to open in 2014, has been criticised for costing £45 million of public money to establish. Before it opened, the former chair of the Public Accounts Committee, Margaret Hodge, called it a "vanity project". However, Ofsted inspected the Sixth Form in autumn 2016, rated it "outstanding" in all areas and praised it for creating "a community of scholars". Its first set of A Levels were described as "outstanding" by The Times, which reported that "almost a third" of pupils "cannot afford to pay for school meals, but they achieved 12% A* grades and 42% A* to A grades".

In 2015 it was reported that Harris Academies had some of the highest turnover of staff amongst schools in the UK, with The Guardian reporting that over a third of Harris teachers leave after just one year, with 1,000 teachers leaving the Federation in three academic years, underlined by 34 leaving Harris Falconwood in 2015 alone. The Anti-Academies Alliance put this high turnover down to poor working conditions, excessive workload and unreasonable pressure on teachers from senior leadership.

In 2019 numerous Harris Academies were accused of "gaming" the system through the practice of entering entire cohorts for the ESOL qualification, which is aimed at students who have English as an additional language (EAL), Harris Falconwood entered the whole of their Year 11 cohort (177 students) despite only having 15 EAL students. This was shown to be common practice across the Federation.

=== Challenging Ofsted ===
Harris educates about 2.5% of London school children, and considers itself experienced in increasing the social mobility of children of low income families. It has identified that these children do better with shorter Key Stage 3, and a three-year exam orientated Key stage 4. more colloquially this is spoken of as "three years to do their GCSE". Ofsted recognises that their GCSE results are outstanding but believes that the students are losing out on the wider Keystage 3 experience. The UK Office for Standards in Education, Children's Services and Skills (Ofsted) warned Harris, that schools that used the two plus three method would lose their "Outstanding status". Harris instructed its 27 secondary academies to switch back to the three plus two model in July 2019. In many schools, this will have accommodation and staffing cost and they may not transition until September 2020.

In January 2020, Martyn Oliver, the then chief executive of Outwood Grange Academies Trust, told The Times that:

"New Ofsted inspections favour middle-class kids. Inspectors, fighting against schools who just teach to the test are taking a far too simplistic a view on when GCSE teaching should begin. Many of the children in Outwood Grange Academies Trust schools need a three-year run up. They don't have books at home and space for homework. All that has to happen in school time and disproportionately their life chances come from qualifications."

Moynihan backed him up, saying:

"For many of our children qualifications are all they have in their hands at a job interview or college application and beyond. They have no networks, no contacts, no professional people in their family to help them on in life. Their GCSEs are crucial. Ofsted is valuing curriculum over qualifications."

Ofsted denies that they have produced a middle class framework for middle class kids, or that it has a view on two year key-stage three but it is the mileage travelled not the length of the course that was being judged.

=== Remuneration debate ===
In 2017–18, the salary of the CEO of the Harris Federation was in the £440-450,000 bracket which is higher than any other multi-academy trust. The salary has been at the centre of a warning of a "super league" of academy CEO salaries.

=== Governance ===
The trust has three sponsors, who, as of 21 March 2021 are Lord Harris, his wife and his son.

=== Harris Tottenham Controversy ===
In April 2021, a petition was started wanting the head of academy to resign, which reached 6000 signatures within two weeks of its creation. The petition alleged racism and staff bullying.
