= Harris Girls' Academy Bromley =

Location
- Lennard Road; Beckenham, London, BR3 1QR; United Kingdom; 51°24′59″N 0°02′30″W

Information
- Type: Converter academy
- Motto: All can;we will
- Established: 1919
- Department for Education URN: 137379 Tables
- Ofsted: Reports
- Principal: Samuel Rigby
- Gender: Girls, Co-educational Sixth Form
- Age: 11 to 18
- Enrolment: 1176
- Houses: Blue; Red; Green; Yellow
- Website: http://www.harrisbromley.org.uk/

Harris Girls' Academy Bromley, originally Cator Park School for Girls, is a secondary school in Beckenham in the London Borough of Bromley, England, for girls between the ages of 11 and 18, with boys joining in Sixth Form. In 2011, the school joined a federation of academies in South London called the Harris Federation, named after the Lord Harris of Peckham who is sponsoring them.

The Academy was ranked 'Outstanding' by Ofsted in 2017. It was awarded with the World Class Schools Quality Mark, joining the just over 140 schools in the UK accredited with the recognition.

== History ==
Cator Park School for Girls opened in 1919. In World War I, the school had been used as a hospital for injured soldiers.

== Harris Federation ==
Harris Federation is a federation of Primary and Secondary academies in and around London. The academies' sponsor is Phil Harris (Lord Harris of Peckham), the former chairman and chief executive of Carpetright. The federation is a not-for-profit charitable organisation whose stated key aim is "to promote the education of young people in South London".

The Chief Executive Officer is Sir Daniel Moynihan, previously Principal of the Harris City Academy Crystal Palace. He is the full-time CEO at the Harris Federation Headquarters in Croydon. Kelsey Park Sports College (Harris Academy Beckenham) and Cator Park School (Girls' Harris Academy Bromley) converted into Harris Academies for September 2011, the first Harris Academies to open in the London Borough of Bromley.

== Description ==
The Academy is a girls' school with a roll of 900 secondary pupils and a mixed sixth form of 260.

== Academics ==
Virtually all maintained schools and academies in England follow the National Curriculum, and are inspected by Ofsted on how well they succeed in delivering a 'broad and balanced curriculum'. Schools endeavour to get all students at 16 to achieve the English Baccalaureate (EBACC) qualification- this must include core subjects a modern or ancient foreign language, and either History or Geography.

Harris Girls' Academy Bromley operates a three-year, Key Stage 3 as advised where all the core National Curriculum subjects are taught. Maths, Science and English are setted by ability, other subjects and options are taught in mixed-ability classes.

In 10 and 11, that is in Key Stage 4 most students do a Modern Foreign Language, and History or Geography, allowing an English Baccalaureate.

Ofsted reported in 2017:

“Teachers are knowledgeable and enthusiastic. They inspire and sustain a love of learning in their pupils. Teachers have an absolute faith in the ability of their pupils to succeed and give their time generously to ensure that this happens.”

“The excellent quality of teaching, learning and assessment throughout the school is a significant strength.”

== Buildings ==
The site lies within the Aldersmead Conservation Area and the preserved 1920s previous school is grade II listed, though surrounded by additional buildings of little architectural merit. The new build was done by Nicholas Hare Architects in partnership with Kier Construction. It is part of the London 2 batch of the Education Funding Agency's Priority School Building Programme.

The new structure is a simple 3-storey building (in brick and render) that runs parallel to the southern boundary of the Academy, and together with the retained buildings it defines a secure central courtyard. The old building has been refurbished to provide general teaching and administrative support space. The more recent buildings have been demolished to make way for the new specialist teaching building, which houses the Science and Art departments, and a new sports hall.

== Faculty structure ==
Under the Harris Federation the previous house system was overhauled to be known as a faculty structure which is seen in all Harris Academies. The four faculties are now Blue, Yellow, Red and Green which are made up of different subject areas under the leadership of an assistant principal.

== Notable alumni ==
- Cush Jumbo, actress
- Ellie Reeves, Attorney General for England and Wales (2026-present)
- Rachel Reeves, former Chancellor of the Exchequer (2024–2026)
