= List of schools in the London Borough of Wandsworth =

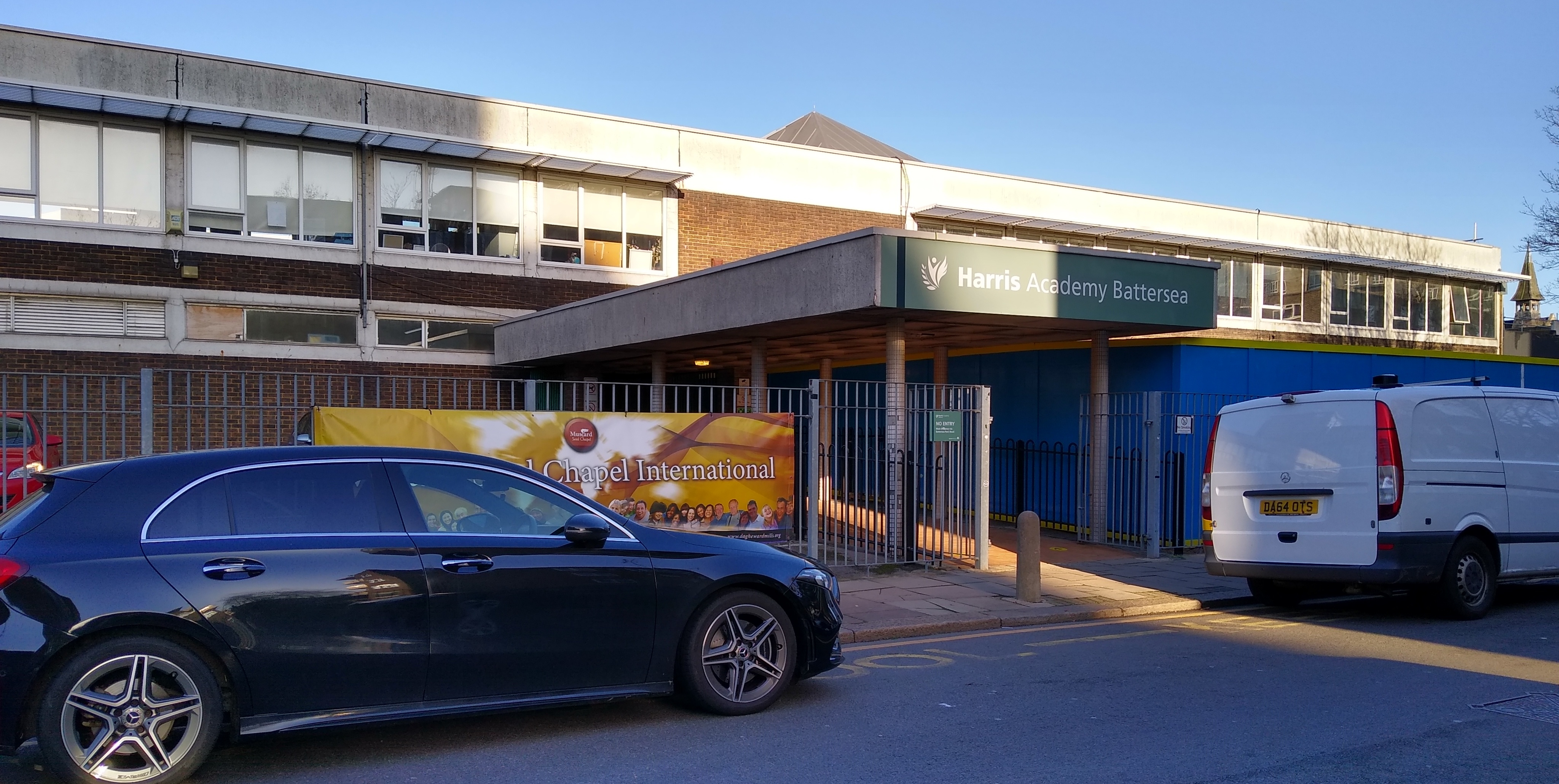
Harris Academy Battersea

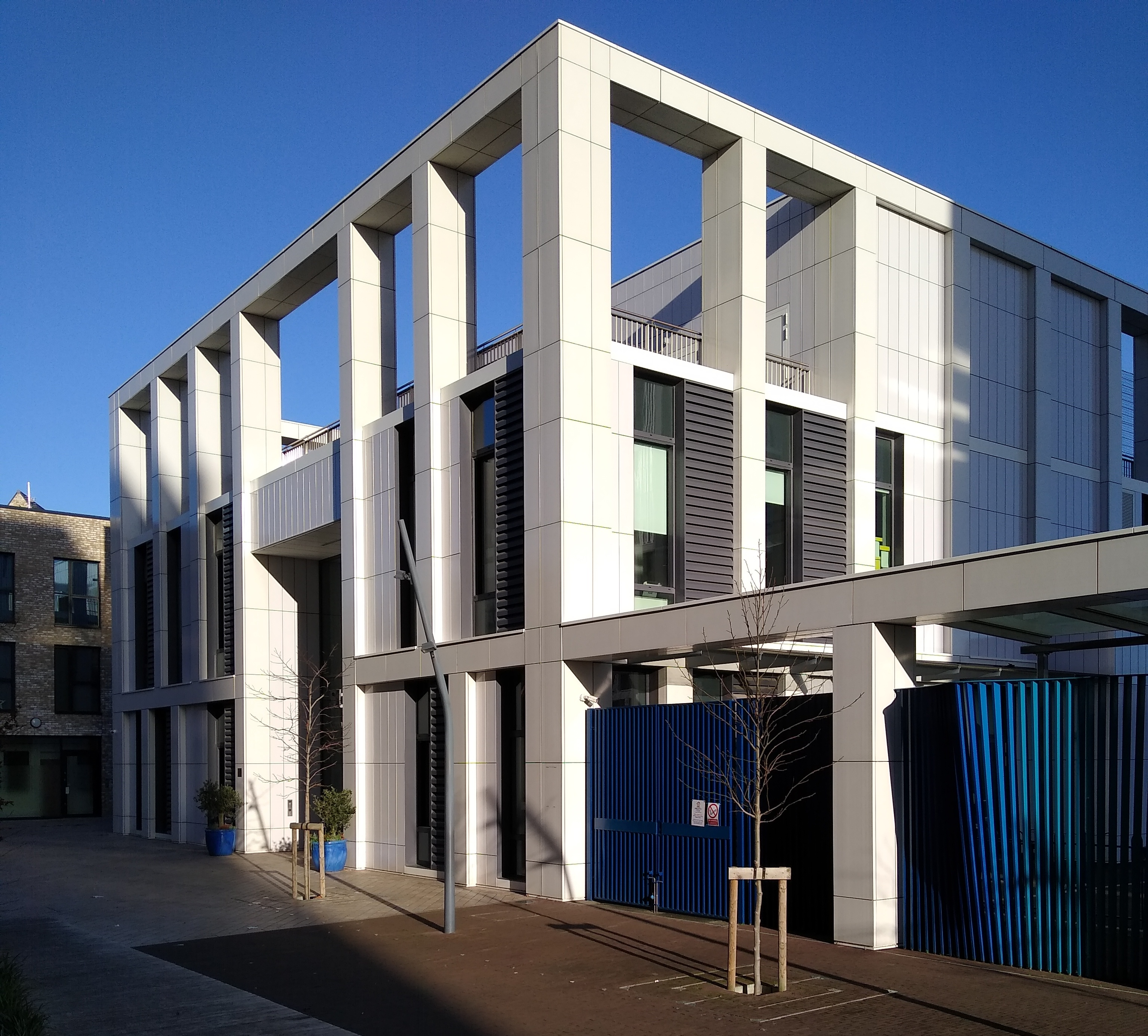
St Mary's Roman Catholic Primary School

This is a list of schools in the London Borough of Wandsworth, England.

== State-funded schools ==
=== Primary schools ===
- Albemarle Primary School
- Alderbrook Primary School
- All Saints CE Primary School
- Allfarthing Primary School
- The Alton School
- Anglo Portuguese School of London
- Ark John Archer Primary Academy
- Beatrix Potter Primary School
- Belleville Primary School
- Belleville Wix Academy
- Brandlehow School
- Chesterton Primary School
- Christchurch CE Primary School
- Earlsfield Primary School
- Falconbrook Primary School
- Fircroft Primary School
- Floreat Wandsworth Primary School
- Franciscan Primary School
- Furzedown Primary School
- Gatton Primary School
- Goldfinch Primary School
- Granard Primary School
- Griffin Primary School
- Heathmere Primary School
- Hillbrook School
- Holy Ghost RC Primary School
- Honeywell Infant School
- Honeywell Junior School
- Hotham Primary School
- John Burns Primary School
- Mosaic Jewish Primary School
- Oasis Academy Putney
- Our Lady of Victories RC Primary School
- Our Lady Queen of Heaven RC Primary School
- Penwortham Primary School
- Ravenstone Primary School
- Riversdale Primary School
- Roehampton CE Primary School
- Ronald Ross Primary School
- Rutherford House School
- Sacred Heart RC Primary School, Battersea
- Sacred Heart RC Primary School, Roehampton
- St Anne's CE Primary School
- St Anselm's RC Primary School
- St Boniface RC Primary School
- St Faith's CE Primary School
- St George's CE Primary School
- St Joseph's RC Primary School
- St Mary's CE Primary School
- St Mary's RC Primary School
- St Michael's CE Primary School
- Sellincourt Primary School
- Shaftesbury Park Primary School
- Sheringdale Primary School
- Smallwood Primary School
- Southmead Primary School
- Swaffield School
- Tooting Primary School
- Trinity St Mary's CE Primary School
- West Hill Primary School
- Westbridge Academy

=== Secondary schools ===
- Ark Bolingbroke Academy
- Ark Putney Academy
- Ashcroft Technology Academy
- Burntwood School
- Chestnut Grove Academy
- Ernest Bevin Academy
- Graveney School
- Harris Academy Battersea
- Saint Cecilia's Church of England School
- St John Bosco College
- Southfields Academy

=== Special and alternative schools ===
- Bradstow School
- Francis Barber Pupil Referral Unit
- Garratt Park School
- Greenmead School
- Linden Lodge School
- Nightingale Community Academy
- Oak Lodge School
- Paddock School
- Victoria Drive Primary Pupil Referral Unit
- Wandsworth Hospital and Home Tuition Service

=== Further education ===
- St Francis Xavier Sixth Form College
- South Thames College

== Independent schools ==
=== Primary and preparatory schools ===
- Broomwood school
- Dolphin School
- Eaton House The Manor School
- Eveline Day School
- Falcons School for Girls (closed 2025)
- Finton House School
- Hornsby House School
- Hurlingham School
- L'Ecole de Battersea
- Merlin School
- Newton Preparatory School
- Parkgate House School
- Prospect House School
- The Roche School
- Thomas's London Day School
- Wandsworth Preparatory School

=== Senior and all-through schools ===
- Al Risalah Boys' School
- Al Risalah Secondary School
- Emanuel School
- Ibstock Place School
- Putney High School
- Thames Christian School
- Thomas's Putney Vale

=== Special and alternative schools ===
- Centre Academy London
- The Chelsea Group of Children
- The Dominie School
- Park House School
- The Priory Lodge School
- The Priory Roehampton Hospital School
- Tram House School
