= Harris Girls' Academy East Dulwich =

Location
- Homestall Road; Peckham, London, SE22 0NR; England; 51°27′27″N 0°03′18″W

Information
- Type: Academy
- Established: September 2006
- Founder: Lord Harris of Peckham
- Trust: Harris Federation
- Department for Education URN: 132711 Tables
- Ofsted: Reports
- Principal: Jo Young
- Gender: Girls
- Age: 11 to 18
- Enrolment: 861
- Capacity: 950
- Website: www.hgaed.org.uk

The Harris Girls' Academy East Dulwich (formerly Waverley School) is a secondary school and sixth form with academy status in the East Dulwich area of the London Borough of Southwark, England. The school converted to academy status in September 2006 and is part of the not-for-profit Harris Federation.

== Description ==
The academy is part of the Harris Federation, having joined in September 2006. It is a single-sex school and is smaller than most secondary schools. The catchment the academy serves is a disadvantaged area and the proportion of students eligible for free school meals is more than twice the national average. Around 85% of students are from minority-ethnic groups; the largest group having Black Caribbean or Black African heritages. Half the students speak English as an additional language. The proportion of disabled students and those with special educational needs is above average. A broadly average proportion have a statement of special educational needs with behavioural, emotional, social or moderate learning difficulties There were new buildings and extensive refurbishments around 2010. The sixth form is part of the Harris Federation joint sixth form provision. The academy's specialisms are sport and fitness, enterprise, and health sciences. Ofsted inspected the school in 2012 and judged it outstanding, which has exempted it ever since from Section 5 inspections.

== Governance ==
The school has a joint local governing body with Harris Boys' Academy East Dulwich. The Academy is a member of the Harris Federation. Ultimate responsibility for the Academy rests with the Board of Trustees of the Federation. Much of the work is delegated to the Local Governing Body which includes governors appointed by the trustees and others who are elected by parents and by staff.

== See also ==
- Harris Boys' Academy East Dulwich
