= Harris Westminster Sixth Form =

Coordinates: 51.4996°N 0.1310°W

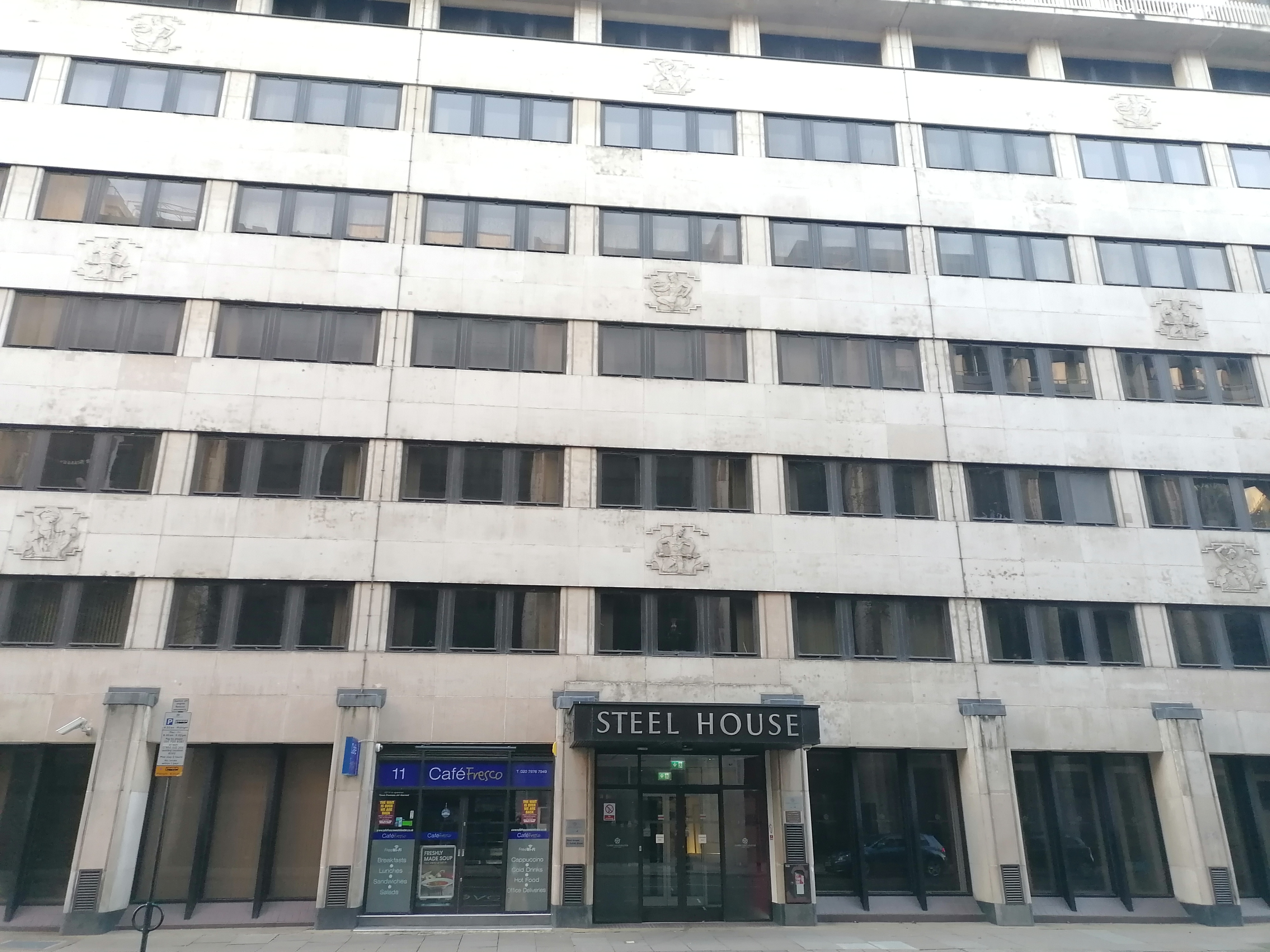
- Harris Westminster Sixth Form main entrance

Location
- 11 Tothill Street; London, SW1H 9LJ; England

Information
- Type: Sixth form Free school
- Motto: Ambition. Perseverance. Legacy.
- Established: 2014
- Founder: Harris Federation; Westminster School
- Department for Education URN: 140939 Tables
- Ofsted: Reports
- Executive Principal: James Handscombe
- Principal: Claire Scott
- Staff: 45 (teaching) 10 (support)
- Gender: Mixed
- Age: 16 to 18
- Enrolment: 574
- Houses: Somerville; Turing; Garrett; Naoroji (formerly Wilberforce then Equiano)
- Colours: Grey and Red
- Publication: The Rose
- Website: harriswestminstersixthform.org.uk

Harris Westminster Sixth Form (also known as Harris Westminster, abbreviated to HWSF) is a selective sixth form in Westminster which was established with the goal of increasing the rate of entry to top universities among students from areas of socio-economic deprivation. Its aim is to "combine the strengths of Westminster School in teaching academically able students with the Harris Federation's experience in establishing and running outstanding maintained sector schools across London". Steel House, the Harris Westminster building, was bought by the government for £45 million in order to create the school.

== History ==
The school was formed from an agreement in 2013 between Harris Federation and Westminster School. It aimed to take on 125 pupils in September 2014, reaching an enrollment of 250 the following year. 167 pupils were offered places in the first year, almost 30% of whom were entitled to free school meals. In 2017 a collection of assemblies from the school's first three years was published.

The last three of the four houses are named after fixed "heroes" with a link to London and special resonance in the school. These "heroes" are Mary Somerville, Alan Turing, and Elizabeth Garrett. The first house, the green house, represents the diversity of humanity by changing its hero each time the House Captain changes. This has happened twice thus far, from William Wilberforce to Olaudah Equiano to Dadabhai Naoroji. Naoroji are the most recent winners of the House Cup as of 2026.

== Location ==
The school is located at 11 Tothill St in Steel House, a former Ministry of Justice building built in 1936. It is within 5-minute walking distance of Westminster School, Westminster Abbey and St Margaret's Church on Parliament Square, where its assemblies are usually held. The closest London Underground station is St James Park tube station.

== Building ==
The 8-storey building was converted by Nicholas Hare Architects.

Building layout
Floor	Subject	Notable rooms
G	None	Library, Hall
1	Maths	Map room, Meetings room
2	Chemistry	Room 20 & Room 22
3	Biology	
4	Physics, Economics	
5	Humanities, English, Modern Foreign Languages	
6	Politics, Philosophy	Student Support, Student Study Area, Music rooms
7	Art	Canteen
8	Economics, Geography	William Blake Reading Room

== Admissions ==
Entrance to Harris Westminster Sixth Form is by 2 entrance exams in 2 chosen subjects, and an academic interview on the applicant's preferred subject. (The exam score threshold for an interview for Priority 3/4 students in the 2021 cycle was 425, in the 2022 cycle it was 420, and in the 2023 cycle it was 407). The offer is conditional on the students' performance at GCSE with a minimum requirement of 6 7s-9s and at least 7 grades in the 4 subjects chosen for study. Preference is given to Priority 1/2 students, recipients of Free School Meals, or children looked after by their local authority, who have a reduced threshold for interview and offer. Applications typically open at the start of September and close at the beginning of December.

== Curriculum ==
Harris Westminster Sixth Form offers a curriculum consisting of A Level subjects. The A Levels offered include English Literature, Mathematics and Further Mathematics, Biology, Chemistry, Physics, Art, Economics, Geography (offered in Year 12 for students opting to also do an EPQ in Year 13), History, Politics, French, Spanish, Analytic Philosophy, and Art History. Subjects with the smallest uptakes (presently German, Drama & Theatre, Music, and Classical Languages) are studied at Westminster School. Year 12 students also take part in 'Cultural Perspectives' courses, which aim to develop cultural capital and to broaden the curriculum.

Every Tuesday afternoon there is a timetabled 'Lab lecture' held in the hall in which an external speaker is invited to speak. A small number of students are invited after each lecture to 'Principal's Tea', where they serve tea and cake to the guest speaker and talk further.

== Extracurricular activities ==
The school also runs weekly compulsory societies in every subject studied at A-Level and societies for prospective Law and Medicine students. On a Thursday afternoon, the school takes part in sports at sites across London or other activities such as Bridge and Debating. The school runs an annual continuous House Cup competition made up of a wide range of competitive activities (19 in 2019/20). These include various sports, such as football, music, drama and University Challenge.

== Examination performance and recognition ==
In its first year of AS Level results, 30% of overall grades were 'A', with the highest achieving departments being Mathematics and Geography at 40% 'A' grades. In its first year of A2 Level results, over 40% of results were A/A* and 25% of their students achieved at least 3 A grades with 50% taking up places at Russell Group universities and six at Oxford or Cambridge. In 2018, 47% of the A-level grades were A/A* (or equivalent), including 17% A* grades (or equivalent). Just under a half of the students attained at least an AAB combination of grades, while a quarter achieved A*AA or better. This marked the best examination performance in the school's history. In 2019, the school received 37 Oxbridge offers, bettering the record of many renowned private schools. In 2020, the school received 44 Oxbridge offers (25 from Oxford and 19 from Cambridge), beating their own record set the year prior.

In 2016, the school was inspected by Ofsted and consequently rated "outstanding" in all areas.

In 2019, it was highlighted by the Good Schools Guide as an example of an effective partnership between state and private schools.

Also in 2019, it was named "Sixth Form College of the Year" by The Sunday Times, with Oxbridge success and support for disadvantaged students noted. The article describes the sixth form as a 'pioneering collaboration with a leading independent school' that 'lifts limits on sixth-formers ambitions'. It continues: 'Harris Westminster's excellent results (as of 2019) rank it fourth overall among sixth-form specialists. They are remarkable given that more than a third of students qualify for the pupil premium, the sum of money given to schools each year by the government to improve the attainment of children from homes with incomes of about £20,000.'

In 2020 the partnership between Harris Westminster and Westminster School was recognised with the "Independent-State School Partnership Award" in the TES Independent School awards. The current headteacher is James Handscombe.

In 2021, The Spectator ran a piece titled 'How Harris Westminster Conquered Oxbridge'. James Handscombe is quoted saying 'Our students are driven. They see that the world has exciting things to offer, but they know those things are not going to come naturally to them unless they go out and get them.’

In 2024, it was reported that the 57 Oxbridge offers received that year was in excess of Eton's total.

In 2025, Harris Westminster was nominated for "Inclusive School of the Year" in the TES Schools Awards.
