= Harris Academy Sutton =

Location
- 2 Chiltern Road; Sutton, Greater London, SM2 5RD; England; 51.347355°N 0.192404°W

Information
- Type: Free school
- Motto: Innovation, Integrity, Discovery
- Established: 1 September 2017; Building 10 September 2018
- Local authority: Sutton
- Trust: Harris Federation
- Specialist: STEM
- Department for Education URN: 143706 Tables
- Ofsted: Reports
- Principal: Mick Berry
- Gender: Coeducational
- Age: 11 to 18
- Enrolment: 861
- Capacity: 1275
- Website: www.harrissutton.org.uk

Harris Academy Sutton is a coeducational secondary school in Belmont in the London Borough of Sutton, England. It is part of the Harris Federation. It opened to pupils in September 2018.

The academy building, that cost £40 million, was constructed as part of the proposed London Cancer Hub project; a global centre for innovation in cancer research and treatment. It is built to passivhaus standards. In 2023, Ofsted ranked the school 'outstanding'.

== Description ==
The building is relatively new and enrolment, as of July 2023, is 861. The capacity of the school is 1275. Each year group contains approximately 200 students, with one year being an exception and approximately 250. The school has made a promotional video of the facilities. When not required by the school, rooms, and spaces are available for commercial hire.

The academy is on the London Cancer Hub site, which is a partnership between the London Borough of Sutton and the Institute of Cancer Research, supported by the Royal Marsden NHS Foundation Trust, the Greater London Authority, and Epsom & St Helier University Hospitals NHS Trust. It is a specialist STEM school, and its co-location on the Hub's site aims to boost scientific learning.

== Media ==
In 2025–2026, allegations were raised in independent Substack publications concerning safeguarding practices and external partnerships at Harris Academy Sutton. One article claimed that a staff member serving as Designated Safeguarding Lead and Stonewall Champion had used their role to deliver gender-identity content via external organisations in ways that allegedly circumvented Department for Education guidance and parental consent processes.

== Academics ==
In September 2023, the school opened a Sixth Form. Before then, it ran classes from Year 7 to Year 11.
