= Harris Academy South Norwood =

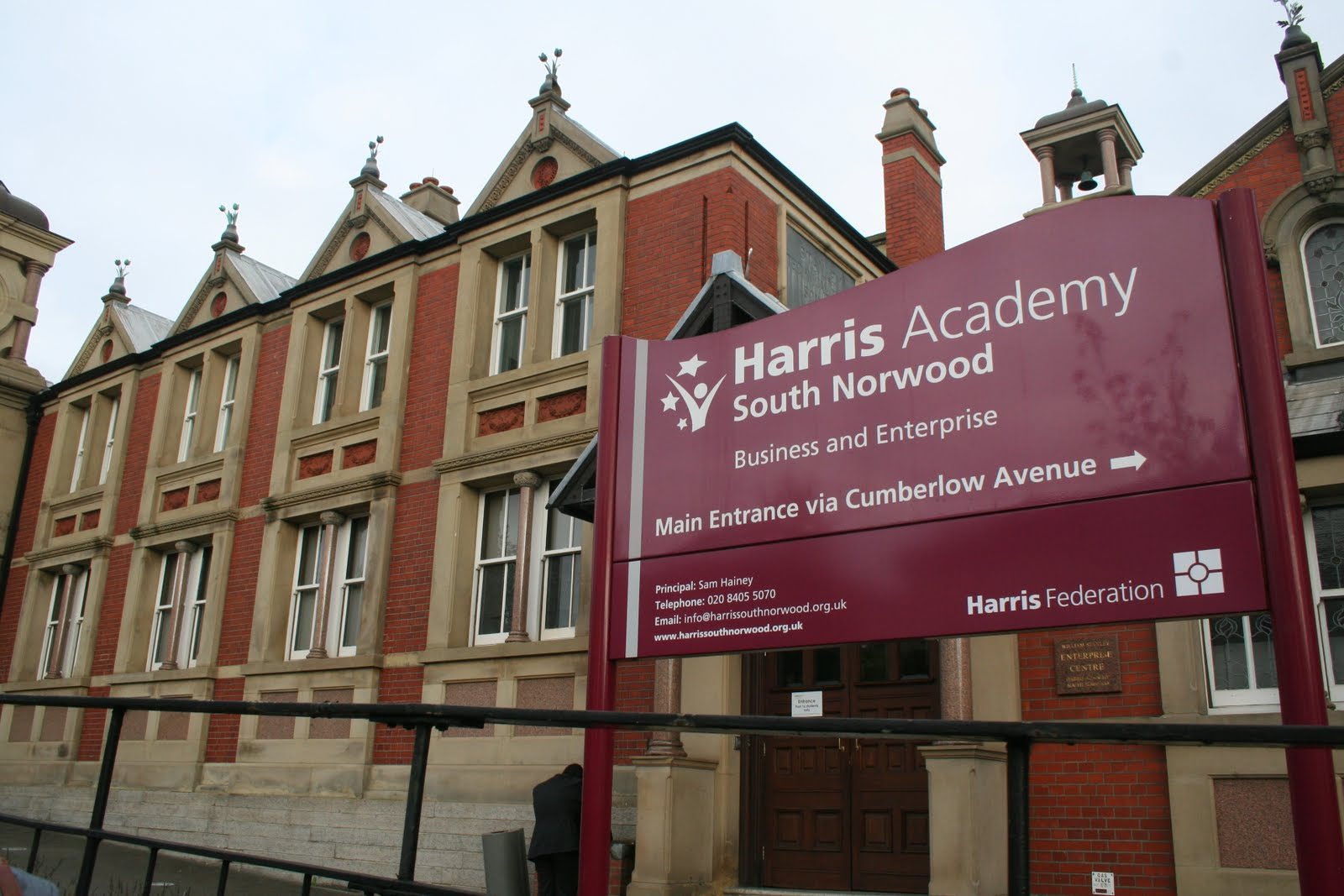

Location
- South Norwood Hill; South Norwood, London, SE25 6AD; England; 51°24′01″N 0°04′32″W

Information
- Type: Academy
- Established: 2007
- Founder: Lord Philip Harris
- Local authority: London Borough of Croydon
- Department for Education URN: 135249 Tables
- Ofsted: Reports
- Head teacher: Alex Williamson
- Gender: Coeducational
- Age: 11 to 18
- Website: https://www.harrissouthnorwood.org.uk/

Harris Academy South Norwood is a city academy in South Norwood, London, for students of both sexes aged 11–18. The school was designated as a Business and Enterprise College by the Department for Education and Skills when it was formerly called Stanley Technical High School. The re-development of the school was finished in November 2007 as part of the renaming. The school belongs to a federation of schools in South London called the Harris Federation named after Philip Harris, Baron Harris of Peckham, the chairman of Carpetright plc. The school is co-educational, changing its status from boys-only which it had been since the school was founded in 1907.

== Location ==
The school is located in South Norwood on both the High Street and South Norwood Hill.

== History ==
Harris Academy South Norwood is on the site formerly occupied by The Stanley Technical School for Boys which was founded by William Ford Stanley in 1907 as a trade school (initially called Stanley Technical Trade School).

Harris Academy South Norwood was one of a trio of schools to be named amongst the reasons why Crystal Palace was named the best place to live in London by The Sunday Times.

In September 2014, the school amalgamated with Harris Academy Upper Norwood, sharing teachers and a sixth form campus. However, in September 2023 the other school site formally demerged to form Harris Academy Beulah Hill.

=== Features ===
The Harris Academy includes a new sixth form for 300 pupils offering academic and vocational subjects. At a cost of £32,000,000 overall, the facilities consist of:

- A new building
- Drama facilities
- Art and Design studios
- Smartboards across all departments

== Harris Federation ==
The Harris Federation is a federation of schools in South London. They are all sponsored by the Lord Harris of Peckham, hence the name. The boroughs included are Wandsworth, Lambeth, Southwark, Croydon, Merton and Bromley.

== Alumni and staff ==
- Krept, musician, half of Krept & Konan
- Victor Moses, association football player
- Stormzy, rapper
- Jamie Webb (staff), international athlete
- Captain Sensible, Musician
- Waheed Alli, Baron Alli, media entrepreneur and Member of the House of Lords (attended as Stanley Technical College)
- Janan Ganesh, journalist, author and political commentator
