= Harris Garrard Academy =

Location
- Yarnton Way, Thamesmead; Erith, Greater London, DA18 4DW; England
- 51.4958°N 0.1353°E

Information
- Former name: Business Academy Bexley
- Type: Academy
- Established: 2002
- Local authority: Bexley London Borough Council
- Trust: Harris Federation
- Department for Education URN: 145140 Tables
- Ofsted: Reports
- Executive principal: Wayne Barnett
- Gender: Mixed
- Age range: 4–18
- Enrolment: 1,430 (2023)
- Capacity: 1,780
- Website: www.harrisgarrard.org.uk

Harris Garrard Academy (formerly Business Academy Bexley) is a 4–18 mixed, all-through school and sixth form with academy status in Thamesmead, Erith, Greater London, England. It was established in 2002 and is now part of the Harris Federation.

== History ==
Business Academy Bexley was established in 2002 as a city academy, a secondary school under the sponsorship of 3E's Enterprises (later acquired by GEMS Education), and property developer David Garrard, chairman of the Minerva group, who donated £2.5 million.

The school relocated to dedicated premises in September 2003 and the primary school section opened in 2004. As of 2007 the total enrollment was 1,477.

The school was constructed on a 33-acre (130,000 m^{2}) site at a cost of £31m. Architect Norman Foster designed the building, which was nominated for the 2004 Stirling Prize, and some parts have been compared to "a smart City office".

However the academy did not make the progress expected and by 2007 was languishing at the bottom of the School League tables for Bexley. In 2008 GCSE results and value added placed it ahead of a number of other non-selective schools in Bexley.

In 2010 the school had a deficit of £500,000, largely for repairs to the "incredibly expensive to run" seven-year-old building, but also to attract staff. The school had had a high turnover of headteachers and pupil enrolment had fallen to about 1,100 exacerbating the deficit.

On 25 September 2011 The Business Academy Bexley was featured on Channel 4's programme 'Derren Brown: How to be a Psychic Spy'.

The school was placed into special measures during an Ofsted inspection on 11 and 12 May 2016.

Due to the school's poor Ofsted inspection, the Harris Federation took over the school and renamed it the Harris Garrard Academy from January 2017. After joining the Federation the primary school section was granted a Literacy specialism.

The academy is now rated as Good in all areas by Ofsted, which comments that the school has 'very high expectations of what its pupils will achieve', and is one of the most improving schools in the Bexley local authority for progress.
