= Harris Academy Chafford Hundred =

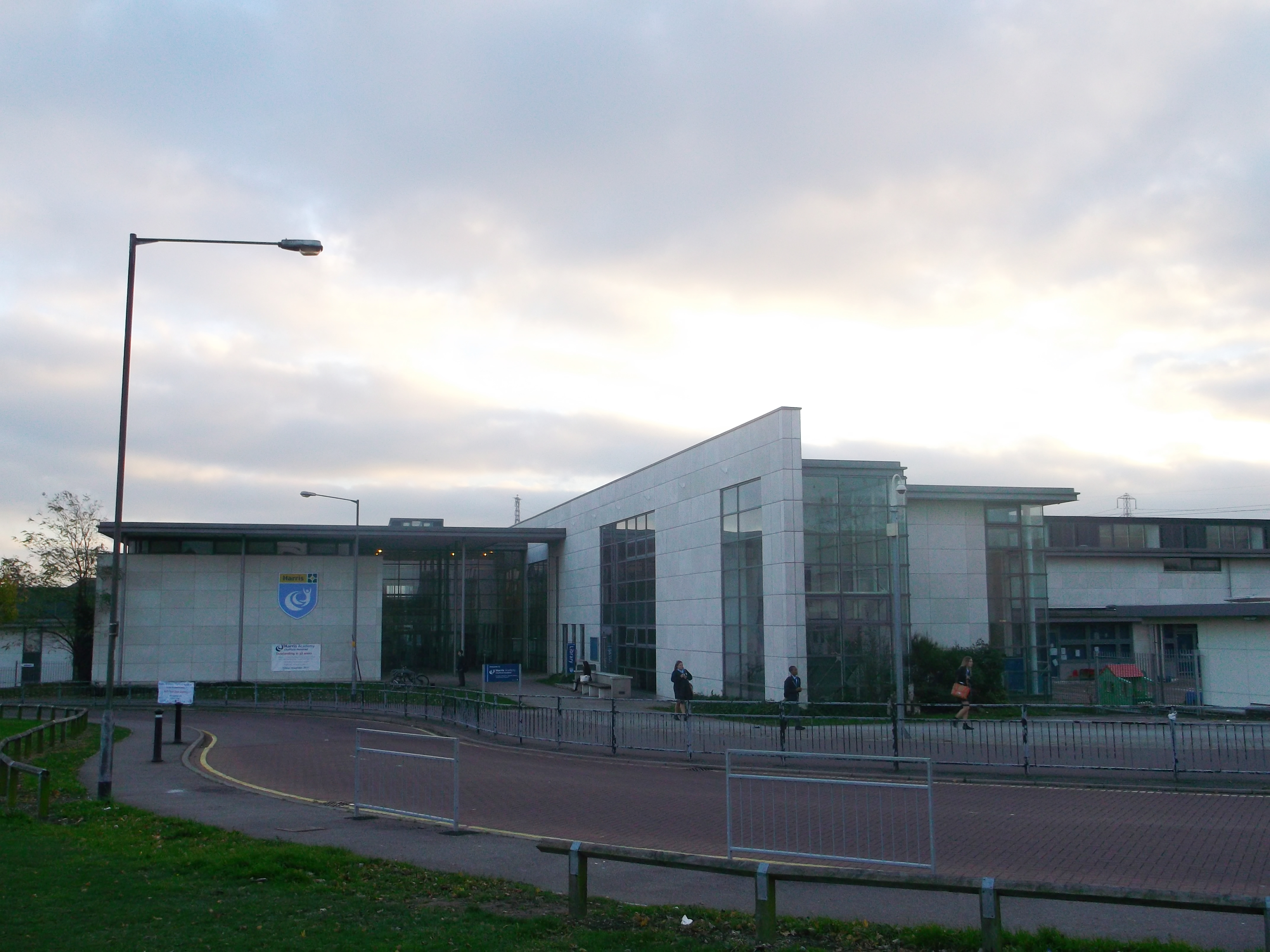

Location
- Mayflower Road; Chafford Hundred; Grays, Essex, RM16 6SA; England; 51.48206°N 0.29273°E

Information
- Type: Academy
- Motto: A School for the Future
- Established: 1 September 2001 (formerly Chafford Hundred Campus)
- Trust: Harris Federation
- Specialists: Business and Enterprise; Applied Learning; Gifted and Talented Education
- Department for Education URN: 137549 Tables
- Ofsted: Reports
- Chair: Phillippe Udrzal
- Executive Principal: Nicola Graham
- Principal: J Maxted
- Gender: Coeducational
- Age: 11 to 19
- Enrolment: 1420 as of March 2022
- Capacity: 1200
- Colour: Sky blue
- Website: harrischaffordhundred.org.uk

Harris Academy Chafford Hundred (formerly Chafford Hundred Campus Business and Enterprise College) is a secondary school and sixth form with academy status located in Chafford Hundred in the borough of Thurrock, England. The building was designed by Nicholas Hare Architects. Previously a comprehensive school, it became an academy on 1 October 2011.

Harris Academy Chafford Hundred is closely linked to Harris Primary Chafford Hundred, Harris Mayflower, and the newer Harris Academy Riverside and Harris Academy Ockendon, sharing executive principals and teaching staff. Before the Riverside building was completed in 2019, Chafford Hundred hosted the establishing school.

== History ==
In June 2000, with a budget of £10 million and under the direction of Thurrock Council as part of the Building Schools for the Future programme, work began on the site for Chafford Hundred Campus Secondary School and Chafford Hundred Primary School. A month later the then-secretary of state for education and skills, Estelle Morris, attended its groundbreaking event as its host. During the event she compared the future schools to Stantonbury Campus and Countesthorpe Community College, stating that they "would be the Stantonbury or Countesthorpe of 2001." Both schools opened on 1 September 2001, after which the headteachers began to cooperate with the intention to merge both schools by 2004. They shared the same site and operated de facto as a unified all-through school under the name Chafford Hundred Campus Schools. They shared teachers, the same system of governance and a senior leadership team.

In 2003 the primary and secondary schools officially federated and began to share the same board of governors. The secondary school had its first evaluation by government education inspectorate Ofsted in May. It was found to have secured a "satisfactory" grade, meaning that it had underachieved. The primary school had already been inspected and was also found to be satisfactory. By 2006 the school was named Chafford Hundred Campus School and had become a specialist Business and Enterprise College.

In 2007 Ofsted inspected Chafford Hundred Campus School and found it to be "performing significantly less well than in all the circumstances it could reasonably be expected to perform." Ofsted gave the school an "inadequate" grade as a result. It was given a year to improve or else it would be placed into special measures and be threatened with closure. Ofsted returned in January 2008, by which time the school had changed its name to Chafford Hundred Campus Business and Enterprise College and gained an additional maths specialism. Ofsted found the school to be "making satisfactory progress in addressing the issues for improvement" and graded the school as "good" five months later. Improvements continued and the school was designated as a high performing specialist school in 2009, gaining specialist status in Applied Learning as a result. It was recognised as the "most improved school in England" by the Department for Children, Schools and Families in January 2010, with the number of students passing their GCSEs rising from 16% to 62% over a three-year period.

Chafford Hundred Campus and its adjacent primary school jointly underwent academisation in October 2011, becoming members of the Harris Federation. Its sixth form opened just before an Ofsted inspection in November 2011. Further expansion occurred with Harris Primary Academy Mayflower opening nearby in 2015, and Harris Academy Purfleet opening in 2019.

== Premises ==
A new build. The building was intended to combine a nursery, primary, secondary and public library for the local area. The building is three storeys tall with three halls, a cafeteria, and over 50 classrooms including specialised ones for science, computing and DT. The two primary and secondary schools, and the sixth form, are all accessible by Mayflower Road. The library, once open to the public, has since been closed. Since opening the school has undergone two extensions.

Some time after, the sixth form was constructed at a cost of £1.2 million. It is a two-storey building with extra classrooms and a cafeteria.
