= Harris Academy Morden =

Location
- Lilleshall Road; Morden, Surrey, SM4 6DU; England; 51.39157°N 0.18022°W

Information
- Type: Academy
- Established: 1 September 2012
- Department for Education URN: 138495 Tables
- Ofsted: Reports
- Head teacher: Julian Sparks
- Gender: Coeducational
- Age: 11 to 18
- Enrolment: 857
- Capacity: 1150
- Website: http://www.harrismorden.org.uk/

Harris Academy Morden (formerly Bishopsford Art College) is a secondary school with academy status in London, England. The school is part of the Harris Federation.

== History ==
The school opened in 1999, and by 2003 it was one of the top schools in Merton. However, this was not always the case. Previously, the school was named Garth High School, though it was a failing school and changed its name to Watermeads in 1995, before finally closing in August 1999. It is built on the land previously occupied by Catherine Gladstone Convalescent Home. In summer 2008, Bishopsford announced their best-ever GCSE results – 57% achieved 5 GCSEs at grades A*-C. In the early days of February 2012 it was announced that the school would be changed to Harris Academy Morden in September 2013 after failing its latest OFSTED inspection.

The Harris Academy opened in September 2013. and was inspected by Ofsted in December 2014. There had been some staff changes and the principal was praised for addressing the previous weaknesses. The changes had not filtered through into the pupils results so the school was graded as 'Good'. A second full Ofsted in June 2018 upgraded this judgement to 'Outstanding'.

== Description ==
This is a small secondary school situated on a large six-acre site in South London.

The school had been successful using a three-year Key Stage 4, but when Ofsted warned Impington Village College that it could not be 'Outstanding' using this curriculum model, it has reverted to the 3+2, three-year Key Stage 3/ two-year Key Stage 4.

== Curriculum ==
Students entering the school in September 2020 as eleven year olds join year 7 and start the three year Key Stage 3. The school does not stream students. Virtually all maintained schools and academies follow the National Curriculum, and are inspected by Ofsted on how well they succeed in delivering a 'broad and balanced curriculum'.

In Key Stage 4, the school endeavours to get all its students to achieve the English Baccalaureate (EBACC) qualification- this must include core subjects a modern or ancient foreign language, and either History or Geography. Here the language is Spanish.
