= Harris Academy Falconwood =

Location
- The Green; Falconwood, London, DA16 2PE; England; 51°27′31″N 0°05′19″E

Information
- Type: Academy
- Motto: Serve Support Success
- Established: 2008
- Trust: Harris Federation
- Department for Education URN: 135677 Tables
- Ofsted: Reports
- Principal: Tom Street
- Gender: Mixed
- Age: 11 to 18
- Enrolment: 1,194
- Website: www.harrisfalconwood.org.uk

Harris Academy Falconwood, formerly Westwood Secondary Modern School, Westwood Secondary School and Westwood College, is a city academy in Falconwood, London, England. The school is non-selective and co-educational.

== History ==
In September 2008 the school joined the Harris Federation. This Federation was set up by the same Lord Harris of Peckham and has been set up as a coalition of several secondary schools in London and Southeast England. Harris Academy Falconwood is part of the Harris Federation Sixth Form. In 2021, the school was ranked the 6th best performing school in Bexley based on information published by the Department for Education in 2019.

In 2021, the Academy was ranked the sixth best performing school in Bexley based on information published by the Department of Education in 2019. The school was rated "Good" in all areas by Ofsted in 2019.

In 2012, the Academy won a bronze Green Apple Environmental Award. The redevelopment of the Westwood College site saw run-down buildings replaced with sustainable alternatives. Solar panels and ground source heating have generated energy savings while the building is constructed at an angle providing the best levels of natural light. Bexley Council’s cabinet member for education, Councillor John Fuller, accepted the award at the House of Commons on November 12.

In 2013, a number of staff lost their jobs at the school following evidence that BTEC science coursework (GCSE-level) for 69 pupils had been written by Year 12 students.

The Academy has long had a reputation for high staff turnover, with forty staff leaving in 2014 alone.

In 2019 numerous Harris Academies were accused of 'gaming' the system through the practice of entering entire cohorts for the ESOL qualification, which is aimed at students who have English as an additional language (EAL), Harris Falconwood entered the whole of their Year 11 cohort (177 students) despite only having 15 EAL students. This was shown to be common practice across the Federation.

Former pupils at Westwood Secondary School include dance instructor and television presenter Len Goodman, who lived at Blackfen and who was a member of the school cricket team.

In March 2020, academy had to close for the rest of the academic year due to national lockdown caused by the COVID-19 pandemic (except for key workers' children).

In September 2020 Terrie Askew retired as Principal, having led the school since 2008. Tom Street, a long-serving employee of the Harris Federation, took up post as Head of Harris Academy Falconwood.

In January 2021, academy had to close again until March due to 2nd national lockdown caused by COVID-19 pandemic (except for key workers' children).

In March 2021, the government’s National Cyber Security Centre issued an alert about a spike in ransomware attacks affecting schools. Despite the academy's software and systems being fully updated at the time, the Harris Federation’s servers have been attacked. A ransomware attack means that cyber-criminals have accessed Harris Federation’s IT systems and encrypted, or hidden, their contents.

In 2012, the Academy won a bronze Green Apple Environmental Award. The redevelopment of Westwood College site saw run-down buildings replaced with sustainable alternatives. Solar panels and ground source heating have generated energy savings while the building is constructed at an angle providing the best levels of natural light. Bexley Council’s cabinet member for education, Councillor John Fuller, accepted the award at the House of Commons on November 12. He said: “It’s a great credit to the academy and its partners to have the project recognised.”
