= Harris Academy Riverside =

Location
- London Road, Purfleet, Essex, RM19 1QY; England; 51.47927°N 0.24055°E

Information
- Type: Free school
- Established: 1 September 2017; Building 10 September 2019
- Local authority: Thurrock
- Trust: Harris Federation
- Department for Education URN: 144750 Tables
- Ofsted: Reports
- Principal: Rachel Sofianos
- Gender: Coeducational
- Age: 11 to 18
- Enrolment: 534 (new school) As of September 2020
- Capacity: 1140
- Website: www.harrisriverside.org.uk

Harris Academy Riverside is a coeducational secondary school and sixth form located in Purfleet in the Thurrock unitary authority, Essex, England. Purfleet is bordered by the A13 road to the north and the River Thames to the south and is within the easternmost part of the M25 motorway but just outside the Greater London boundary. As its name suggests, the school is on the riverside, but separated from the water by a railway line.

The school was established in 2017 but moved into a new dedicated building in 2019.

== Building ==
The new buildings were designed by LSI Architects. They are part of a larger scheme to regenerate Purfleet town centre. The £23M academy is split into two blocks: a four storey teaching block, and a two storey sports block. They will accommodate a 900 pupil secondary school and a 250 student sixth form. The blocks are of conventional construction and use strong branding colour to articulate particular aspects of the facade.

== Curriculum ==
Up to July 2020 the school taught Key Stage 3 years 7 to 9, and had no Key Stage 4. Virtually all maintained schools and academies follow the National Curriculum, and are inspected by Ofsted on how well they succeed in delivering a 'broad and balanced curriculum', to the three year groups in Key Stage 3. Harris Academy Riverside, as a new school, awaits its first Ofsted inspection.

It started to teach year 10s in September 2020; it will endeavour to get all students to achieve the English Baccalaureate (EBACC) qualification- this must include core subjects a modern or ancient foreign language, and either History or Geography.

The academy believes it should encourage its student to read around the subjects they are formally studying and produces personalised 'prep packs', with guidance, extra material, extra reading and video links. As of September 2023, the school had over 100 staff members.

== Sixth form consortium ==
Riverside is in the Chafford Hundred Sixth Form Consortium, with Harris Academy Chafford Hundred and Harris Academy Ockendon. Riverside specialises in mathematics and sciences and has the specialist labs needed to teach them.
