= Chobham Academy =

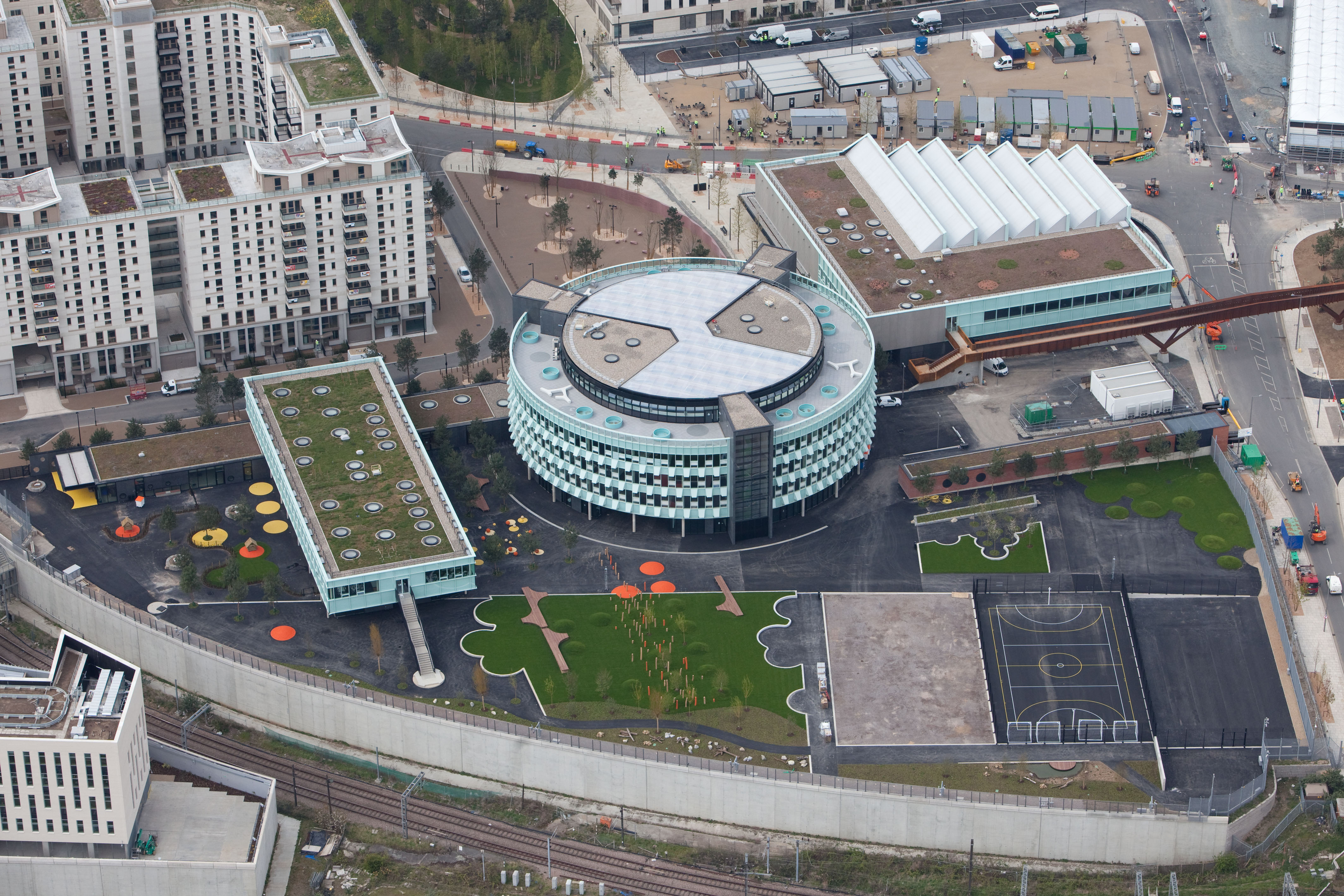

Location
- 40 Cheering Lane; Stratford, London, E20 1BD; England; 51°32′57.44″N 0°0′25.8″W

Information
- Type: Academy
- Established: 2013; 13 years ago
- Department for Education URN: 139703 Tables
- Ofsted: Reports
- Principal: Francesca Perry
- Head of school: Alice Hogdson(Primary joint of head) Elin Gardner(Primary joint of head) Simon Carrasco(Secondary) Ibrahim Bitlice(Sixth Form)
- Gender: Mixed
- Age: 3 to 18
- Enrolment: 2041
- Capacity: 1780
- Classes offered: GCSE: Art & Design Business Studies Biology Chemistry Combined Science Computer Science Design and Technology Drama Economics English (Literature and Language) Film Studies Geography History Mandarin Math Music PE Physics Sociology Religious Studies Spanish A levels: Art Biology Chemistry Drama and Theatre Studies Economics English Literature Film Studies Geography Graphics Communication History Mandarin Mathematics Physics Psychology Religious Studies Sociology Spanish CTEC: Business Studies Sport
- Houses: Adichie Bannister Franklin Himid Mandela Ramanujan
- Colour: Blue Yellow 🟦🟨
- Website: www.chobhamacademy.org.uk

Chobham Academy is a mixed all-through school and sixth form which opened in September 2013. The school is located on Cheering Lane in the East Village of Stratford in the London Borough of Newham, England. It has 1,800 student places and has a specialism in performing arts and English.

Chobham Academy is located in buildings that were first used during the 2012 Summer Olympics as the main base for organising and managing teams. Rebuilt after the games, it opened in September 2013 as an education campus comprising: a nursery, primary and secondary school, sixth form and adult learning facility.

As a school that was purpose-built to serve the new community established in the former Olympic Village, priority for admission into the school is given to those who live in East Village.

The school is operated by the Harris Federation, a federation of primary and secondary academies in England. The school is sponsored by Lendlease, which was responsible for the design, development and construction of East Village, on behalf of the London Organising Committee of the Olympic and Paralympic Games. The school building was designed by architects Allford Hall Monaghan Morris.

== Ofsted inspections ==
As of 2026, the school's most recent inspection by Ofsted was in 2025, when it was judged Outstanding.
