= Harris Academy Wimbledon =

Location
- High Path, South Wimbledon, Greater London, SW19 2JY; England; 51.406229°N 0.217069°W

Information
- Type: Free school
- Motto: Make A Difference
- Established: September 2014
- Local authority: Merton London Borough Council
- Trust: Harris Federation
- Department for Education URN: 145860 Tables
- Ofsted: Reports
- Principal: Joanne Larizadeh
- Gender: Mixed
- Age range: 11–18
- Enrolment: 672 (2023)
- Capacity: 1150
- Website: harriswimbledon.org.uk

Harris Academy Wimbledon is coeducational secondary school located in the Wimbledon in Greater London, England. It is part of the Harris Federation multi-academy trust. It opened to pupils in September 2018 in temporary accommodation. It had a pre-opening Ofsted inspection. In 2023, Ofsted ranked the school 'outstanding'. The school celebrated their first ever GCSE results in 2023.

== Description ==
It opened to a single year group, Year 7 in September 2018, with 90% of students following the EBacc curriculum of English, Maths, Biology, Physics, Chemistry, a Humanities subject (History and Geography) and a language (Spanish and Latin).

== Curriculum intent ==
Virtually all maintained schools and academies follow the National Curriculum, and are inspected by Ofsted on how well they succeed in delivering a 'broad and balanced curriculum'. Schools endeavour to get all students to achieve the English Baccalaureate (EBACC) qualification- this must include core subjects a modern or ancient foreign language, and either History or Geography. Schools have been strongly advised to offer a three-year Key Stage 3. The Harris Academy Wimbledon has decided that there are grounds for teaching all of its pupils Spanish and Latin. Spanish is justified on the number of hispanophones worldwide.

== Buildings ==
The school opened in a refurbished Victoria premises near Wimbledon Chase and was situated there until 2020, when the school then moved to a new premises designed by CPMG Architects. Though the site is compact, it offers sports opportunities in football, rugby, hockey, netball, cricket, and tennis. There are programmes including drama, dance, music, technology, art & design and photography that will benefit from specialist rooms.
