= Harris Academy Battersea =

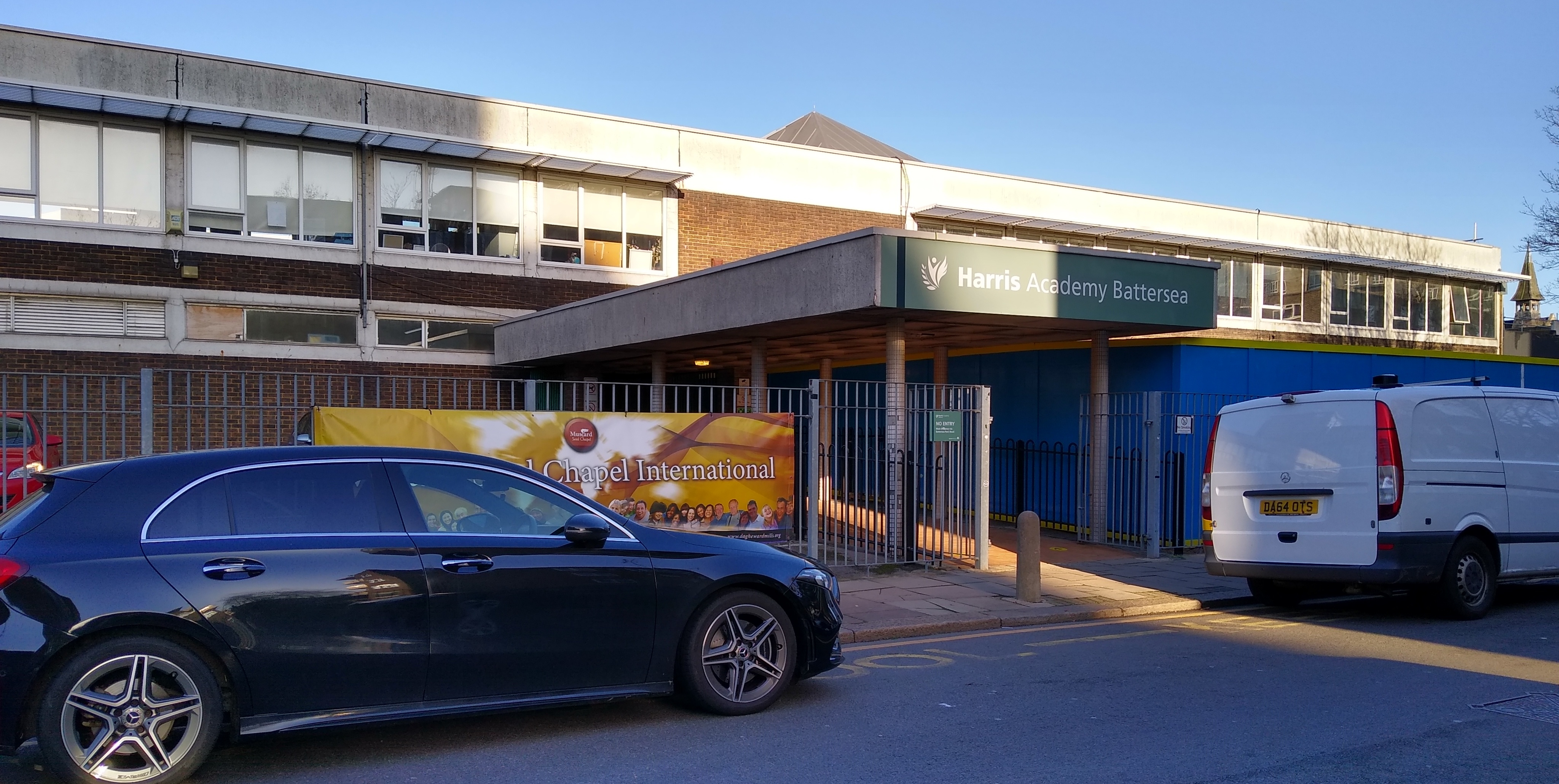

Location
- 401 Battersea Park Road; Battersea, London, SW11 5AP; England; 51.47302°N 0.15933°W

Information
- Type: Academy
- Established: 1 September 2014
- Department for Education URN: 140985 Tables
- Ofsted: Reports
- Head teacher: Steve Hinz
- Gender: Coeducational
- Age: 11 to 19
- Website: www.harrisbattersea.org.uk

Harris Academy Battersea is a coeducational secondary school and sixth form with academy status, located near Battersea Park in the Battersea area of the London Borough of Wandsworth, England.

== History ==
It was first established as Battersea Park School in 1986 and when it gained specialist status as a Technology College it was renamed Battersea Technology College. The school was awarded a second specialist status as a Performing Arts College in 2007, and changed back to its original name in 2008. In 2009 it became a foundation school. In September 2014 Battersea Park School converted to academy status and was renamed Harris Academy Battersea. The school is part of the Harris Federation.

Ofsted inspected the school in 2018 and judged it 'outstanding'. Previously Battersea Technology College, had difficulties resulting in the school becoming a Harris Academy in 2014 after it was branded inadequate. In one year at the previous school, no pupils gained five or more GCSE passes. In 2003 three per cent of children left with five A*-C GCSEs and in 2017 this figure was 83%. As of 2018 the school is oversubscribed and a percentage of students are applying to Russell Group universities .

Students from the school were subject to extreme bullying, assault and hostile threats from other students, particularly in the early 2000's. The former Headmaster Dave Moody, gave an apology in 2014, on behalf of the previously failed students of the school.

== Description ==
Harris Academy Battersea is a member of the Harris Federation multi-academy trust. The academy is an averaged-sized, mixed secondary school with a sixth form. The proportion of pupils eligible for the pupil premium funding is well above the national average as is the proportion of pupils who speak English as an additional language, while the proportion of pupils who have SENand/or disabilities is in line. The Head Teacher is Steven Hinz and the Executive Principal is Peter Groves.

== Academics ==
The curriculum is broad and balanced, with a focus on subjects that contribute to the English Baccalaureate. It is under constant review. The proportion of students achieving the English Baccalaureate at the end of Year 11 is well above the national average. Extra-curricular activities enhance the curriculum. These include sport, music and museum trips.
