= Harris Academy Merton =

Location
- Wide Way; Mitcham, Surrey, CR4 1BP; England; 51°24′07″N 0°08′04″W

Information
- Type: Academy
- Motto: Achievement is Success
- Established: 2006
- Trust: Harris Federation
- Department for Education URN: 131897 Tables
- Ofsted: Reports
- Principal: Aisha Samad
- Gender: Coeducational
- Age: 11 to 18
- Enrolment: 1286
- Capacity: 1200
- Website: harrismerton.org.uk

Harris Academy Merton, formerly Tamworth Manor High School, and prior to that Pollards Hill High School, is a secondary school and sixth form in the London Borough of Merton district of Mitcham, England.

== History ==
In 2004 Merton council decided that Tamworth Manor School should cease to be maintained by the local council but become an academy. This led to protests. The decision had been taken by the Labour administration on Merton Council and was supported by the local MP Siobhain McDonagh and Labour councillors. It was opposed by the then Conservative opposition on Merton Council. Rob MacDonald, an activist in the Socialist Party, brought the case to the High Court of Justice. He urged parents to contest the "privatisation" of education. On 27 July 2006 the High Court decided that the closure of Tamworth Manor school to make way for an academy should go ahead.

== Inspections ==
When inspected by Ofsted in both 2012 and 2022, it was judged to be outstanding. The 2012 Ofsted report complimented the teachers, who understood their pupils and tailored their teaching to their needs. The 2022 Ofsted report states that 'leaders are ambitious for all. They have very high expectations of pupils in every subject. All pupils learn the rich curriculum exceptionally well.'

== Harris Federation ==
The academy is part of the Harris Federation, a federation of academies originally in five South London boroughs. The Harris Federation is an education charity. It opened its first school in 1991 and now runs 54 primary and secondary academies in London and Essex.

== Harris Academy Merton ==
The academy takes in students from both genders between the ages of 11 and 19. The academy serves an ethnically diverse community. In 2012 the largest ethnic group was Black or Black British but there was a significant number of Asian and Asian British students. About 28% of students were disabled or had special educational needs. Fifteen per cent were supported through school action, and 13.5% school action plus or with a statement of special educational needs. These proportions are both above national averages. Nearly 40% of its students are eligible for the pupil premium.

The academy opened a sixth form in September 2007. Courses are offered on site in conjunction with Harris CTC.

== Academics ==
The school follows the National Curriculum for England.

== Location ==
The academy is on the edge of Wide Way and Recreation Drive, north of Mitcham Common in Pollards Hill. The nearest train stations are at Norbury and Mitcham Eastfields, with the nearest Tramlink stop at Beddington Lane station.
