= Philip Harris, Baron Harris of Peckham =

British businessman and peer (born 1942)

The Right Honourable The Lord Harris of Peckham
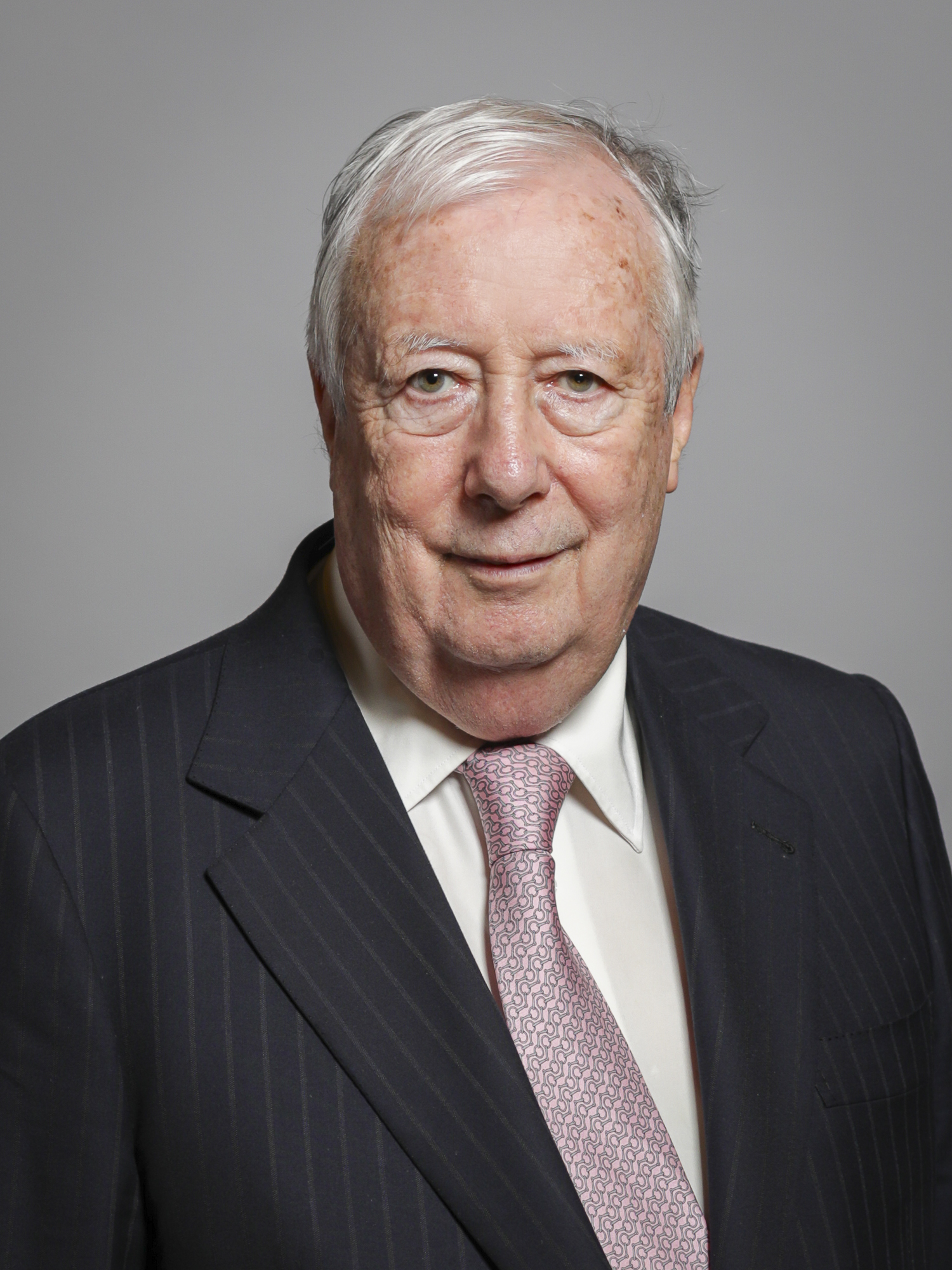
- Official portrait, 2019
- Born: Philip Harris; 15 September 1942 (age 84); Peckham, London, England
- Occupation: Businessman
- Known for: Carpetright, Harris Federation, Arsenal FC
- Political party: Conservative
- Spouse: Pauline Harris

Member of the House of Lords
- Lord Temporal
- Life peerage 11 January 1996

Philip Charles Harris, Baron Harris of Peckham (born 15 September 1942), is an English businessman and politician. Although a prominent Conservative Party donor and former Deputy Chairman of the Conservative Party Board of Treasurers, he supported the Labour Party at the 2024 general election, but maintained the Conservative Whip.

Harris is an active member of the House of Lords, and sponsors a large multi-academy trust, the Harris Federation.

== Interests ==
=== Business ===
Harris is currently an advisor and shareholder of Tapi Carpets, a flooring retailer set up recently by a number of the old Carpetright management team. Harris was the Chairman of Carpetright plc and has over fifty years' experience in carpet retailing. Harris left Carpetright in 2014, sold all of his shares and he was no longer associated with the company. In 2024 Tapi Carpets acquired the Carpetright name and intellectual property, making Harris once again Honorary President of both the Tapi and Carpetright brands.

He was chairman and chief executive of Harris Carpets. Harris Carpets acquired Queensway in 1977 to become Harris Queensway plc until the company was taken over in 1988.

Harris was also a non-executive director of Great Universal Stores plc for 18 years, retiring from the GUS Board in July 2004. Harris became a non-executive director of Matalan in October 2004.

=== Football ===
He was appointed to the board of Arsenal Football Club as a non-executive director in November 2005.

=== Equestrian interests ===
Harris is the co-owner of the horse Hello Sanctos, which won a gold medal with Scott Brash in the team show jumping event at the London 2012 Summer Olympics. Harris won a second gold medal in the team show jumping with Scott Brash in the 2024 Paris Olympics, this time on Hello Jefferson.

Harris and Lord Kirkham bought Hello Sanctos for an estimated €2 million at the start of 2012. They are also co-owners of the horses Hello Sailor, Hello Unique and Hello Boyo.

== Politics ==
=== Conservative Party donations ===
Harris has been a donor to the Conservative Party since the 1980s and was a great admirer of Margaret Thatcher. He also made donations to David Cameron as leader of the Conservative Party and Michael Gove.

=== Comments on Theresa May ===
In a September 2017 interview with The Times he described Theresa May as very indecisive, hopeless during the general election campaign which she should have won easily, and leading a weak, directionless government. Other comments made included his opposition to an expansion of grammar schools, May u-turning on too many decisions such as the so-called dementia tax, and the Home Office not reducing net migration to the tens of thousands as repeatedly promised. Harris spoke about potential candidates on who could succeed May as Conservative Party Leader.

== Harris Federation academies ==
He has contributed extensively to education and as a result, many schools and colleges (such as Harris Manchester College, Oxford) bear his name. Through the Harris Federation, many secondary schools in South London have received Harris donations. In the London Borough of Croydon, he helped to found the Harris City Technology College, Harris Academy South Norwood and Harris Academy Merton, Harris Academy Purley, Harris Academy Chafford Hundred, Harris Academy Peckham although many local residents are angered that the original name of the Harris Academy South Norwood, Stanley Technical High School, was dropped in place of the Harris name.

In recent years, the forced change to academy status has placed additional schools under the management of the Harris Federation despite considerable opposition from Boards of Governors and parents.

== Personal life ==
=== Sunday Times Rich List ===
Harris ranked 206th in the Sunday Times Rich List, with an estimated wealth of £285m.

== Honours ==
Harris was knighted in 1985. He was made a life peer as Baron Harris of Peckham, in the London Borough of Southwark on 11 January 1996.

His wife, Pauline, was created a Dame Commander of the Order of the British Empire (DBE) in 2004.

Coat of arms of Philip Harris, Baron Harris of Peckham
Crest [On a Wreath Or and Vert] a Demi Horse rampant Argent on its head a Plume of three Feathers Vert and resting its sinister forefoot on a Tenterhook erect Gules. Escutcheon Vert a chevron Argent between in chief two Rolls of Carpet in cross section Or and Gules and in base a Horse statant Argent. Supporters On either side a Horse Sable standing on a Mount of Grass proper issuing therefrom Sprigs of Broom Vert flowering Or and grasping in the mouth a like sprig of Broom. Motto Caritas Fructum Habet (Charity bears fruit)

Orders of precedence in the United Kingdom
Preceded by The Lord Sewel	Gentlemen; Baron Harris of Peckham	Followed by The Lord Bowness
