= Harris Academy Beckenham =

Location
- Manor Way; Beckenham, Greater London, BR3 3SJ; England; 51°23′57″N 0°01′33″W

Information
- Type: Academy
- Motto: Aspire, Discover, Achieve
- Established: 1 September 2011
- Trust: Harris Federation
- Department for Education URN: 137121 Tables
- Ofsted: Reports
- Principal: Chris Brett
- Gender: Co-educational
- Age: 11 to 18
- Houses: Blue (Franklin); Yellow (Turing); Red (Seacole); Green (Attenborough)
- Website: http://www.harrisbeckenham.org.uk/

Harris Academy Beckenham (formerly Kelsey Park Sports College) is a secondary school and sixth form located in Beckenham in the London Borough of Bromley. The academy is run by the Harris Federation. It was awarded 'Outstanding' in its 2023 Ofsted report.

== History ==
Harris Academy Beckenham started life as Alexandra Boys School, in Parish Lane, Penge. The school opened in 1875 and consisted of one room.

In the mid-1950s, it was decided to move to a new school which would be built on the Elgood Playing Fields in Beckenham. However, it took more than 10 years for these plans to become a reality. On 23 April 1968, Kelsey Park School for Boys opened. In 2005 it achieved Sports College status resulting in Kelsey Park changing its identity and renaming to 'Kelsey Park Sports College'.

=== Harris Federation ===
Following growing pressure from local parents in the Beckenham area for a co-educational school a public consultation in February 2011 regarding the future of the school concluded that Kelsey Park Sports College was to become a co-educational academy sponsored by the Harris Federation from September 2011 with the Kelsey Park name being scrapped. The first co-educational year began in September 2012.

=== Notable alumni ===
Nick Heyward, (b,1961) singer-songwriter and guitarist; lead singer-songwriter for Haircut One Hundred; attended Harris Academy Beckenham where he studied art and photography. He left school at 16 to work as a commercial artist.
