= Business and Enterprise College (United Kingdom specialist schools programme) =

Type of British specialist school

- Business & Enterprise Colleges logo
- England

Information
- Established: 2002

Business and Enterprise Colleges (BECs) were introduced in 2002 as part of the 2011-defunct Specialist Schools Programme in England. The system enabled secondary schools to specialise in certain fields. Schools that successfully applied to the Specialist Schools Trust and became Business and Enterprise Colleges received extra funding for applied business teaching from this joint private sector and government scheme. Business and Enterprise Colleges act as a local point of reference for other schools and businesses in the area, with an emphasis on promoting enterprise and commercial awareness within the community.

Ever since the Specialist Schools Programme's discontinuation in 2011, schools can currently become BECs through the Dedicated Schools Grant or by becoming an academy.

== Schools' Enterprise Education Network ==
In his budget speech of March 2006, the Chancellor of the Exchequer, Gordon Brown announced that the government would be funding a network of best practice to support the delivery of Enterprise Education within the UK. This network (called the Schools' Enterprise Education Network (SEEN) was based on the expertise within BECs—56 hubs (one per county) were identified in May 2006. At a launch conference the hub co-ordinators were advised of the local BECs that would act as 'spokes' to support the dissemination to all state-maintained secondary schools.
