= Harris Academy Ockendon =

Harris ockendon academy

Location
- Erith Drive; South Ockendon, Essex, RM15 5AY; England; 51.512536°N 0.278053°E

Information
- Type: Academy
- Motto: Enjoy being the best you can be
- Established: 1956
- Local authority: Thurrock
- Trust: Harris Federation
- Department for Education URN: 147537 Tables
- Ofsted: Reports
- Principal: Jo Rainey
- Executive Principal: George McMillan
- Gender: Coeducational
- Age: 11 to 18
- Enrolment: 1239
- Website: www.harrisockendon.org.uk

Harris Academy Ockendon (formerly The Ockendon Academy, originally Lennard's Secondary Modern School) is a coeducational secondary school and sixth form with academy status, located in South Ockendon in the Thurrock area of Essex, England.

== Description ==
The Ockendon Academy was a popular 11 to 18 medium-sized comprehensive school that was strong on pastoral care, with well behaved pupils and a good sixth form programme. Elsewhere it was struggling and an Ofsted inspection in 2018 deemed that it was overall inadequate. It had converted to academy status in 2012, and now needed to 'refactor' to become part of a multi-academy trust. It joined the Harris Federation; it was rebranded as the Harris Academy Ockendon.

== History ==
The school opened in 1956, named the Lennard's Secondary Modern School. It was part of a wave of secondary modern schools that were built to cope with the post-war baby boom, and the Attlee government policies of 1944. It was a selective system, and young people could leave school at fifteen. The school leaving age was raised to 16 years in 1972.

When Essex converted to the non-selective comprehensive school system, Lennard's became Culverhouse Comprehensive School.

In April 2009, the school became designated as a Training School.

In August 2010, the school received the highest pass rate in its GCSE examinations, with 98% achieving A*-C grades.

On 1 January 2011 the school was renamed from The Ockendon School to The Ockendon Academy following an Academy conversion. The school was downgraded to 'good' following an Ofsted inspection in February 2014. It was downgraded again to 'inadequate' in October 2018.

The Ockendon Academy joined the Harris family of schools in September 2019, It rapidly has put new detailed policies in place, with the aim of improving student outcomes. The Principal is Jo Rainey.

== Academics ==
The multi-academy trust that the Ockendon Academy selected to join has a reputation for producing 'outstanding schools'. Part of this is the paperwork they produce as evidence for an Ofsted inspection. Schools are obliged by legislation to put in place multiple policies, revise them annually and present them to their governors for approval.

Ofsted had divided its criticism in to two parts-

- that teachers rapidly learn to promote pupils’progress through an understanding of their starting points and individual needs [being] well trained in both the subject they are teaching and how best to teach it.
- that pupils’ outcomes must improve by applying a consistent methodology to the pedagogy.

In the 'Learning and Teaching Policy Sept-2020', Harris addresses the first of those two weaknesses. It has introduced a new ethos and has implemented a challenging, knowledge lead curriculum.

=== Pedagogical approach ===
The second concern is addressed by the new fixed format lesson. It starts with 'test' on previous work, for example the homework task from the previous lesson, and previous weeks. It moves on to the three phases of fully guided instruction- where the teacher teaches (known as the I do) then works through examples with the pupils (known as We do) then supervises the pupils as they do tasks on their own with out assistance (known as You do). The homework is set- this usually involves the 'read, cover, regurgitate, and check phases of using a knowledge organiser that the teacher had previously prepared while planning the lesson.

=== Curriculum content ===
Virtually all maintained schools and academies follow the National Curriculum, and are expected to deliver a 'broad and balanced curriculum' at Key Stage 3.

At Key Stage 4, schools endeavour to get all students to achieve the English Baccalaureate (EBACC) qualification- this must include core subjects, a modern foreign language, and either History or Geography. In additions a range of optional subjects are offered. Harris Academy Ockendon operates a three-year, Key Stage 3 where all the core National Curriculum subjects are taught.

=== Teaching and learning ===
The school places the responsibility for subject content to the subject teams. They select what needs to be taught before how it is delivered.
