= Harris City Academy Crystal Palace =

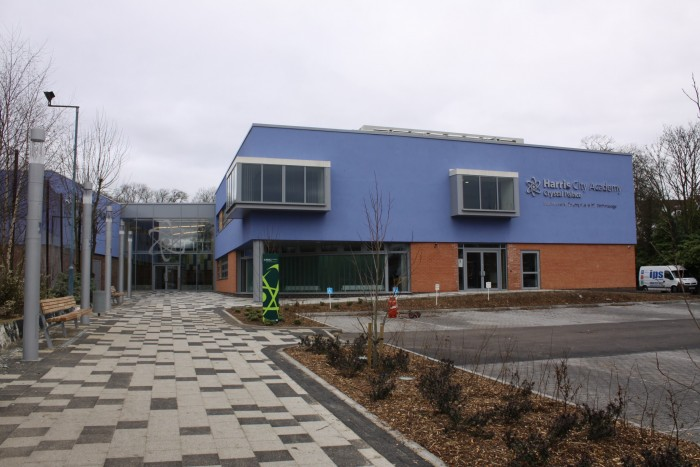
- The post-16 block at the front of the Academy (finished in 2010).

Location
- Maberley Road; Croydon, London, SE19 2JH; England; 51°24′42″N 0°04′37″W

Information
- Type: Academy
- Motto: All can achieve
- Founder: Philip Harris
- Local authority: London Borough of Croydon
- Specialist: Business & Enterprise
- Department for Education URN: 135311 Tables
- Ofsted: Reports
- Principal: Samuel Rigby
- Gender: Mixed
- Age: 11 to 18
- Enrolment: 2010
- Colours: Green and Black
- Website: http://www.harriscrystalpalace.org.uk/

Harris City Academy Crystal Palace is a mixed-sex secondary school and sixth form in Croydon, south London, England. It was established in 1990 to replace Sylvan High School, a newly built mixed comprehensive school which had opened in 1974. Sylvan, judged to be under-performing, re-opened as a City Technology College (CTC) sponsored by Lord Harris of Peckham. In September 2007, Harris CTC became Harris City Academy Crystal Palace.

== Background ==
The new Harris CTC introduced new systems and structures and results steadily improved. In recent years the examination performance of the school has been excellent.

The conversion to Academy status in September 2007 brought with it the promise of £10 Million for new buildings and facilities. The work on the new buildings was completed by November 2010, with a new sixth form block, reception, internal walkways and classrooms now in use.

The Sixth Form results were also the best ever achieved by the Academy with 100% of students passing their A-level exams and 82% of all grades achieved resulting in a grade A, B or C.

In October 2009, under the new tougher Ofsted inspection criteria, the Academy became the first secondary school in the country to achieve an outstanding grade in each of the 30 categories. By Easter 2010, the Academy was still the only school in England to have achieved this result.

The 2014 Ofsted report rated the academy 'outstanding'.

Over 2000 applications were received for 180 places in Year 7 for September 2009. The intake of the Academy is of mixed ability.

The Sixth Form is part of a federated Sixth Form with Harris South Norwood, Harris Merton, Harris Purley, Harris Bromley, Harris Beckenham and Harris East Dulwich Girls. The Sixth Form at Crystal Palace delivers primarily AS and A level courses and around 400 students are based there. The other two sites offer some AS and A levels but also a range of vocational courses. Harris City Academy Crystal Palace is also a registered Cisco Networking Academy and offers the CCNA course to Post-16s throughout the Federation as part of the enrichment programme.

The Academy is a "Gifted and Talented" specialist school. Opportunities for students have included visiting NASA astronaut training facilities in HACCP, Florida and many other residential trips.

== Student Commission ==
The Harris Federation Student Commission is a project which involves 70 students from all the Harris Academies. These students work together with teachers and leading educationalists in order to explore ways of further improving teaching and learning. The commission is supported by NESTA and is part of a national project called Learning Futures.

== Year Structure ==
=== Faculties ===
In each year group of the academy, students are divided into faculties (commonly known as 'houses' in other schools). Students wear different colours of tie depending on the faculty they are put into. The faculties are as follows:

- Arts, with a green tie
- Communications, with a blue tie
- Maths & Commerce, with a red tie
- Science & Tech (formerly Science & PE), with a yellow tie

In each year group, there are six tutor groups consisting of approximately 20-30 students. This means that some year groups will have fewer students in one faculty.

=== Bands and sets ===
In each year group, pupils are randomly split into two 'bands' labelled X and Y. There are 'sets' for both groups, ranging from 1 (highest ability) to 4 (lowest ability). The bands themselves are not based on ability. The X/Y split exists because not every student has the same subjects; it also ensures that students are more likely to get the subjects they pick for their GCSEs.

Students get to choose their GCSE options in Year 9 and begin studying the subjects they have chosen in Year 10. As with most schools in England, Maths, English and the three sciences are mandatory subjects and every student must do them. Students also get an option to choose between Geography and History, and while they can pick both, this means sacrificing one other optional subject.

The academy also has post-16 provision, which contains Year 12 and Year 13 students. The sixth form teaches a variety of subjects, and is also part of a rugby training school in conjunction with Harlequins.

== Harris Federation ==
The school was founded in 1990 as a City Technology College. In September 2007, Harris CTC was integrated into the Harris Federation. This Federation was set up by Lord Harris of Peckham and has been set up as a coalition of several secondary schools in Croydon, Merton and Southwark. As of August 2023, the Harris Federation runs 52 primary and secondary academies in London and Essex.
