= 1984 New Year Honours =

British royal recognitions

The New Year Honours 1984 were appointments by most of the Commonwealth realms of Queen Elizabeth II to various orders and honours to reward and highlight good works by citizens of those countries, and honorary ones to citizens of other countries. They were announced on 31 December 1983 to celebrate the year passed and mark the beginning of 1984 in the United Kingdom, New Zealand and the Cook Islands, Fiji, the Bahamas, Papua New Guinea, the Solomon Islands, Saint Lucia, Saint Vincent and the Grenadines, and Antigua and Barbuda.

The recipients of honours are displayed here as they were styled before their new honour, and arranged by honour, with classes (Knight, Knight Grand Cross, etc.) and then divisions (Military, Civil, etc.) as appropriate.

== United Kingdom and Commonwealth ==
=== Baron ===
Life Peers

- The Right Honourable Arthur George Bottomley, OBE, Member of Parliament from 1945 to 1959, and from 1962 to 1983. Minister of Overseas Development 1966–67, and formerly holder of other Ministerial posts.
- Sir Peter Gordon Henderson, KCB, lately Clerk of the Parliaments.
- The Honourable Robert Alistair McAlpine, Joint Honorary Treasurer of the Conservative and Unionist Party.
- The Right Honourable Frederick William Mulley, Member of Parliament for the Park Division of Sheffield 1950–83. Secretary of State for Defence 1976–79 and formerly holder of other Ministerial posts.

=== Privy Counsellor ===
- Kenneth Wilfred Baker, MP, Minister of State, Department of Trade and Industry. Member of Parliament for Mole Valley.
- Kenneth Harry Clarke, QC, MP, Minister of State, Department of Health and Social Security. Member of Parliament for Rushcliffe.
- Alexander Patric Greysteil, The Earl of Gowrie, Minister for the Arts.

=== Knight Bachelor ===
- John Badenoch, Consultant Physician, Oxfordshire District Health Authority.
- Richard John Bailey, CBE, Chairman, Royal Doulton Tableware (Holdings) Ltd.
- Maurice Edward Bathurst, CMG, CBE, QC. For services to International and Comparative Law.
- Timothy Hugh Bevan, Chairman, Barclays Bank PLC.
- Paul Anthony Bramley, Professor of Dental Surgery, University of Sheffield.
- James William Alexander Burnet (Alastair Burnet). For services to journalism and broadcasting.
- Lawrence Byford, CBE, QPM, H.M. Chief Inspector of Constabulary.
- John Robert Cater, lately Chairman, The Distillers Company PLC.
- Oswald Davies, CBE, DCM, Chairman, Amec PLC.
- Reginald Edwin Eyre, MP. For Political and Public Service.
- Geoffrey Finsberg, MBE, MP. For Political and Public Service.
- Richard Brinsley Ford, CBE. For services to the Arts.
- Anthony Stuart Garner. For Political Service.
- Arthur Abraham Gold, CBE. For services to Sport.
- Patrick Hamill, QPM, Chief Constable, Strathclyde Police.
- Wynn Normington Hugh-Jones, MVO. For Political and Public Service.
- Peter Stewart Lane. For Political Service in the South of England.
- Christopher Donald Lawson. For Political Service.
- Spencer Le Marchant. For Political and Public Service.
- Edwin Ronald Nixon, CBE, Chairman and Chief Executive, IBM United Kingdom (Holdings) Ltd.
- Dimitri Obolensky, Professor of Russian and Balkan History, University of Oxford.
- Kenneth Johnston Sharp, TD, lately Head of Government Accountancy Service, Department of Trade and Industry.
- Philip Shelbourne, Chairman, Britoil PLC.
- William James Simpson, lately Chairman, Health and Safety Commission.
- Thomas Richard Edmund Southwood, Linacre Professor of Zoology, University of Oxford.
- John Sparrow, lately Director-General, Central Policy Review Staff.
- Michael Ian Bowstead Straker, CBE. For public services in the North East.
- John Henry Alan Swinson, OBE. For public services in Northern Ireland.
- Peter Anthony Thompson, Chairman and Chief Executive, National Freight Consortium plc.
- John Robert Vane. For services to pharmaceutical research.
- Gerard Folliott Vaughan, MP. For Political and Public service.
- Alan John Ralph Veale, Managing Director, GEC Power Engineering Ltd. For services to Export.
- Peter Ingram Walters, Chairman, The British Petroleum Company PLC.
- David Mackenzie Wilson, Director, British Museum.

Australian States

State of Queensland

- Dr. Llewellyn Roy Edwards, MLA. For services to government and parliament.

State of Tasmania

- Geoffrey James Foot. For services to the community.

=== Order of the Bath ===
==== Knight Grand Cross of the Order of the Bath (GCB) ====
Military Division

- General Sir George Cooper, KCB, MC, ADC (Gen.), (357063), Colonel Commandant Corps of Royal Engineers, Colonel The Queen's Gurkha Engineers, Colonel Commandant Royal Pioneer Corps.

Civil Division

- Sir Brian Crossland Cubbon, KCB, Permanent Under-Secretary of State, Home Office.

==== Knight Commander of the Order of the Bath (KCB) ====
Military Division

Royal Navy

- Vice Admiral Edward Rosebery Anson.
- Vice Admiral David Worthington Brown.

Army

- Lieutenant General Charles Richard Huxtable, CB, CBE, (420858), Colonel Commandant The King's Division, Colonel The Duke of Wellington's Regiment (West Riding).
- Lieutenant General Joseph David Frederick Mostyn, CBE, (397994), Colonel Commandant The Light Division, Colonel Commandant Army Legal Corps.
- Lieutenant General Richard Frederick Vincent, DSO, (417555), Colonel Commandant Royal Regiment of Artillery, Colonel Commandant Corps of Royal Electrical and Mechanical Engineers, Honorary Colonel 100th (Yeomanry) Field Regiment Royal Artillery (Volunteers) Territorial Army.

Royal Air Force

- Acting Air Marshal Donald Percy Hall, CB, CBE, AFC.

Civil Division

- Gordon Stanley Downey, CB, Comptroller and Auditor General.
- Peter Edward Middleton, Permanent Secretary, HM Treasury.

==== Companion of the Order of the Bath (CB) ====
Military Division

Royal Navy

- Rear Admiral John Phillip Edwards, MVO.
- Rear Admiral John Scott Grove, OBE.
- Rear Admiral David Edward Macey.
- The Venerable Archdeacon Raymond Harcourt Roberts, QHC.

Army

- Major General Joseph Porter Crowdy, QHP, (399616), late Royal Army Medical Corps.
- Major General Jonathan Hugh Baillie Dent, OBE, (400735), late 1st The Queen's Dragoon Guards.
- Major General John Patrick Groom, CBE, (403475), Colonel Commandant Corps of Royal Engineers (now RARO).
- Major General Richard Martyn Jerram, MBE, (397291), Colonel Commandant Royal Tank Regiment.
- Major General Barry Michael Lane, OBE, (433169), Colonel The Light Infantry.
- Major General Martin Henry Sinnatt (393289), late Royal Tank Regiment.

Royal Air Force

- Air Vice-Marshal Robert Leslie Davis, (Retired).
- Air Vice-Marshall Laurence Alfred Jones, AFC.
- Air Vice-Marshal Richard Charles Fairfax Peirse.
- Air Commodore Irene Joyce Harris, ARRC, QHNS, Princess Mary's Royal Air Force Nursing Service.

Civil Division

- Frank Graham Allen, Clerk of the Journals, House of Commons.
- John Francis Holroyd Barker, Principal Director, Ministry of Defence.
- Rex Alan Browning, Deputy Secretary, Overseas Development Administration.
- William Dermott, Head of Agricultural Science Service, Ministry of Agriculture, Fisheries and Food.
- Jack Gill, Secretary, Export Credits Guarantee Department.
- John Stuart Goldsmith, Director General, Defence Accounts, Ministry of Defence.
- Terence Michael Heiser, Deputy Secretary, Department of the Environment.
- Edmund Rawlings Reward, Chief Master of the Supreme Court (Chancery Division).
- Geoffrey Gordon Hulme, Deputy Secretary, Department of Health and Social Security.
- Ivor Harry Lightman, Deputy Secretary, Welsh Office.
- John Howard Locke, Director, Health and Safety Executive.
- William Derek Collier Lyddon, Chief Planning Officer, Scottish Development Department.
- Ivor Thomas Manley, Deputy Secretary, Department of Energy.
- David Bryan Rogers, Deputy Secretary, Board of Inland Revenue.
- Peter William Rumble, Under Secretary, Department of the Environment.
- Richard Maybury Hastie-Smith, Deputy Secretary, Ministry of Defence.
- Stanley Anthony Treleaven Warren, Deputy Secretary, Ministry of Defence.
- Robert James Weir, Chief Medical Officer, Department of Health and Social Services, Northern Ireland.

Australian States

State of Queensland

- Dr. Douglas George Wilson, Government Medical Officer.

=== Order of Saint Michael and Saint George ===
==== Knight Grand Cross of the Order of St Michael and St George (GCMG) ====
- Sir Hugh Cortazzi, KCMG, HM Ambassador, Tokyo.
- Sir James Craig, KCMG, HM Ambassador, Jedda.

==== Knight Commander of the Order of St Michael and St George (KCMG) ====
- Richard Mark Evans, CMG, HM Ambassador-designate, Peking.
- Charles Sydney Rycroft Giffard, CMG, HM Ambassador-designate, Tokyo.
- John Edward Jackson, CMG, HM Ambassador, Brussels.
- Philip Robert Aked Mansfield, CMG, HM Ambassador, The Hague.

==== Companion of the Order of St Michael and St George (CMG) ====
- David Alan Nicholls, Assistant Secretary, Ministry of Defence.

Diplomatic Service and Overseas List

- Hugh James Arbuthnott, lately Counsellor, H.M. Embassy, Paris.
- Nicholas Peter Bayne, H.M. Ambassador, Kinshasa.
- Anthony David Brighty, Counsellor, H.M. Embassy, Lisbon.
- Kevin Francis Xavier Burns, British High Commissioner, Accra.
- Richard Dennis Cleft, Foreign and Commonwealth Office.
- Eileen Denza, lately Legal Counsellor, Office of the United Kingdom Permanent Representative to the European Community, Brussels.
- Reginald Eric Holloway, H.M. Consul-General, Toronto.
- Keith Gordon MacInnes, Foreign and Commonwealth Office.
- Richard Oliver Miles, H.M. Ambassador-designate, Tripoli.
- Alan Gordon Munro, H.M. Ambassador-designate, Algiers.
- Michael Edmund Pike, H.M. Ambassador, Hanoi.
- Gerald Chierici Warner, Foreign and Commonwealth Office.

Australian States

State of Queensland

- Keith Williams. For service to the community.

=== Royal Victorian Order ===
==== Dame Commander of the Royal Victorian Order (DCVO) ====
- Lady Susan Katharine Hussey, CVO.

==== Commander of the Royal Victorian Order (CVO) ====
- Major Derek Swithin Allhusen.
- Muriel Murray Brown, MVO.
- Michael William Leonard.
- John Philip Brooke Brooke-Little, MVO.
- Alexander Morrison, QPM.

==== Member of the Royal Victorian Order (MVO) ====
At this time the two lowest classes of the Royal Victorian Order were "Member (fourth class)" and "Member (fifth class)", both with post-nominal letters MVO. "Member (fourth class)" was renamed "Lieutenant" (LVO) from the 1985 New Year Honours onwards.

Fourth Class

- Jane Egerton Warburton.
- John French, TD.
- Leonard John Gost.
- Joshua Alexander Loss, OBE.
- Commander Alick Christopher Moore, Royal Navy.
- John Inglis Drever Pottinger.
- Graham Tullis Ross.
- Commander Simon Nicholas Guy Sloot, Royal Navy.

Fifth Class

- Cherrill Diana Auton.
- Jane Bartlett.
- Inspector Stephen Orme Burgess, Metropolitan Police.
- Fiona Margaret Fletcher.
- Richard Saxon French, RVM.
- Squadron Leader Christopher Max Gerig, Royal Air Force.
- David Bertram Fenn Gorringe.
- Peter Dawson Hartley.
- Superintendent Brian Peter Jeffery, Metropolitan Police.
- Squadron Leader Hugh Northey, Royal Air Force.

==== Medal of the Royal Victorian Order (RVM) ====
In Silver

- Police Constable Stanley Reid Buchan, Metropolitan Police.
- Police Constable Andrew Craig, Metropolitan Police.
- Cyril John Crowe.
- William Fenwick.
- Anne Gardner.
- George Whyte Gordon.
- Philip Greenaway.
- Police Constable Anthony William Haines, Metropolitan Police.
- Police Constable Andrew Merrylees, Metropolitan Police.
- Violet Agnes Minell.
- K4288209 Chief Technician John Wakeham, Royal Air Force.
- Chief Petty Officer Steward Terence Jack Warner, D060267U.

=== Order of the British Empire ===
==== Knight Grand Cross of the Order of the British Empire (GBE) ====
Military Division

- Air Chief Marshal Sir John Gingell, KCB, CBE, Royal Air Force.

==== Dame Commander of the Order of the British Empire (DBE) ====
Civil Division

- Guinevere, Lady Tilney. For Political and Public Service.
- Helen Mary Warnock. For Public Service.

==== Knight Commander of the Order of the British Empire (KBE) ====
Military Division

Army

- Lieutenant General Geoffrey Hugh Whitby Howlett, OBE, MC, (411979), late The Parachute Regiment, Colonel Commandant Army Catering Corps.

Royal Air Force

- Acting Air Marshal John Bernard Fitzpatrick, CB, Royal Air Force.

==== Commander of the Order of the British Empire (CBE) ====
Military Division

Royal Navy

- Commodore Anthony Casdagli.
- Captain George Kenneth Beattie, RD*, Royal Navy Reserve.
- Captain Richard James Husk.
- Captain Hugh William Young, ADC.

Army

- Brigadier Christopher John Airy (433040), late Scots Guards.
- Brigadier Michael Anthony Aris (439934), late The Royal Anglian Regiment.
- Brigadier Francis Guy Barton (403385), late Corps of Royal Engineers.
- Colonel Patrick Phillip Dennant Stone, OBE, (461965), late The Royal Anglian Regiment.
- Colonel Paul William Symes (461952), late Royal Army Ordnance Corps.
- Colonel Derrick Geoffrey Turner (365525), late Royal Corps of Transport (now RARO).
- Colonel William George Rhyll Turner, MBE, (433257), late The Duke of Edinburgh's Royal Regiment (Berkshire and Wiltshire).
- Brigadier Charles Edward Wilkinson, OBE, TD, ADC, (416143), Honorary Colonel 3rd (Volunteer) Battalion The Worcestershire and Sherwood Foresters Regiment (29th/45th Foot) Territorial Army.

Royal Air Force

- Air Commodore John Cameron Atkinson, (Retired).
- Air Commodore Thomas Arthur Bennett, OBE.
- Air Commodore Peter John Goulthorpe, OBE.
- Reverend (Group Captain) Alexander Glen Bowie, QHC.
- Group Captain Michael James Graydon.

Civil Division

- Mollie Pearson Abbott, lately Principal, Dunfermline College of Physical Education.
- Kenneth Arthur Abel, DL, Chief Executive, Dorset County Council.
- David Allford, Architect, YRM Partnership.
- David Alliance, Chief Executive, Vantona Viyella plc.
- Professor Annie Therese Altschul, lately Director, Department of Nursing Studies, University of Edinburgh.
- Arthur John Ritchie Anderson. For Political and Public Service in the East of England.
- Peter Edward Gerald Balfour, Chairman, Scottish Council, (Development and Industry).
- John Chalmers Ballantyne, Ear, Nose and Throat Surgeon, Royal Free Hospital and King Edward VIIth Hospital for Officers.
- Peter Maurice Barclay, Chairman, National Institute for Social Work.
- William Cairns Beattie, Chairman, Clothing and Allied Products Industry Training Board.
- Thomas Norman Biggart, lately President, Law Society of Scotland.
- Alexander Henry Boggon, Deputy Chief Agricultural Officer, Department of Agriculture and Fisheries for Scotland.
- David Ernest Bolt, lately Chairman, Central Committee for Hospital Medical Services.
- Professor Ian Butterworth. For services to Physics at the Imperial College of Science and Technology.
- Commander Ian Tofts Campbell, VRD, Royal Naval Reserve. For Political Service in Scotland.
- Anthony Martin Grosvenor Christopher, Chairman, National Association for the Care and Resettlement of Offenders.
- Professor Keith Martin Clayton. For services to the University Grants Committee and to the University of East Anglia.
- Cyril Edwin Coffin, Director-General, Food Manufacturers' Federation.
- John William Cook, Official Solicitor, Church Commissioners for England.
- Lieutenant Colonel Uvedale Shobdon Corbett, DSO, DL, President, British Poultry Federation.
- Philip Crosland, Foreign and Commonwealth Office.
- Peter Darrell, Artistic Director, The Scottish Ballet.
- Bryan Frank Edbrooke, Director "A", Department of Transport.
- Roger Wykeham Ellis, Master, Marlborough College.
- Jeremy Vernon Elwes. For Political Service in the South of England.
- Hugh Robert Featherstone, OBE, Director-General, Freight Transport Association.
- George Edward Fenn, QPM, Chief Constable, Cheshire Constabulary.
- Anthony Field, Finance Director, Arts Council of Great Britain.
- Francis Finlay (Frank Finlay), Actor.
- Hugh Fish, OBE. For services to the Natural Environment Research Council and to water supplies.
- Nathan Fletcher. For Political Service.
- Trevor Victor Norman Fortescue, lately Secretary General, Food and Drink Industries Council.
- The Honourable James Muir Galloway Galbraith. For services to Forestry particularly in Scotland.
- John Gaston, Chairman and Chief Executive, Northern Ireland Electricity Service.
- John Gilchrist, Chief Valuer, Scotland, Board of Inland Revenue.
- Cecilia Elspeth Giles. For Political and Public Service in Scotland.
- Kenneth Henry Grange, Partner, Pentagram Design.
- Nicole Harrison, Chairman, Education Committee, Association of Metropolitan Authorities.
- Henry Felix Clement Hebeler. For services to the veterinary profession and to animal welfare.
- James Hodgson, formerly Managing Director, British Telecommunications International.
- Alexander Randolf Houseman, Chairman, Economic Development Committee for the Gauge and Tool Industry.
- Alfred Arthur John Hudson, Brigade Secretary, The Boys' Brigade.
- George Peter Hutchinson. For Political and Public Service in the north of England.
- Robert Flinders Jackson, Deputy Managing Director and Director, Engineering, Northern Division, United Kingdom Atomic Energy Authority.
- John Leonard Jinks, Professor of Genetics, University of Birmingham.
- Norman William Jones, TD, lately Group Chief Executive, Lloyds Bank.
- Thomas Jones, OBE. For Public Service in Wales.
- John Davenport Kay, Chief Architect, Department of Education and Science.
- Richard Darwin Keynes, Professor of Physiology, University of Cambridge.
- James Cuthbert Lavin, Director, Royal Ordnance Factory, Chorley, Ministry of Defence.
- John MacCalman Little, Deputy Chairman and Chief Executive, Anderson Strathclyde plc.
- Staniforth Wilson Lockhart, Procurator Fiscal, Ayr.
- Dennis Roy Lomer, lately Board Member, Central Electricity Generating Board.
- Douglas Hume Lowndes, Director, The Newspaper Society.
- Bevil Guy Mabey, Chairman, Mabey & Johnson Ltd. For services to Export.
- John Scott Marshall. For services to local government in Portsmouth.
- Owen Stephen Masefield, OBE, lately Chairman, Motor Insurers' Bureau, Council of Bureaux, and Motor Conference.
- Jack Midgley, lately Assistant Secretary, Board of Customs and Excise.
- Peter Minoprio. For Political Service.
- Otho Charles David Mitchell. For political Service.
- Howard Walter Morris. Chairman, Welsh Industrial Development Advisory Board.
- Harry Mortimer, OBE. For services to Brass Band music.
- David Peter, The Right Honourable Baron Mottistone, DL. For Political and Public Service.
- Jean Elizabeth Muir (Mrs. Leuckert), Designer and Director, Jean Muir Ltd.
- Ronald Hayden Newham, Director of Engineering, Thorn EMI Electronics Ltd.
- Colonel Stuart Richard Newman, TD. For Political Service.
- Robert Ogden, Chairman, Ogden Group of Companies.
- Francis William O'Grady, TD, Foundation Professor of Microbiology, University of Nottingham.
- Zena Elsie Oxlade, lately Chairman, General Nursing Council for England and Wales.
- John Frederick Physick, Deputy Director, Victoria & Albert Museum.
- Anthony Michael Pilch. For services to the provision of care in retirement.
- Enid Mary, Lady Ralphs, DL, Chairman of Council, The Magistrates' Association.
- Kenneth Rawnsley, Professor and Head of Department of Psychological Medicine, Welsh National School of Medicine.
- Raymond Mildmay Wilson Rickett, Director, Middlesex Polytechnic.
- Hyman Rose, Group Technical Director, Foseco Minsep plc.
- Brian John Rusbridge, Secretary, Local Authorities' Conditions of Service Advisory Board.
- Frank Trevor Salt, Supply Director/Board Member, Rolls-Royce Ltd.
- Lionel Alexander Sanson, OBE, Marketing Director, British Aerospace plc. For services to Export.
- John Buttifant Sewel, President, Convention of Scottish Local Authorities.
- Alexander Thomas Basil Shand, Chairman, Alexander Shand Holdings Ltd.
- Charles Wesley Shannon, Assistant Director, Department of the Director of Public Prosecutions, Northern Ireland.
- John Vincent Sheffield, lately Chairman, Business Education Council.
- Alan Arthur Shepherd, Managing Director, Ferranti Electronics Ltd.
- Alice Maud Sheridan, Deputy Director, Social Work Service, Department of Health and Social Security.
- Aubrey Edward Singer, Managing Director, BBC Television.
- Allan Keppie Smith, Managing Director, Production Division, Babcock Power Ltd.
- Charles Russell Smith, lately President, British Textile Confederation. For services to Export.
- Colonel Douglas Norman Spratt, OBE, TD, Chairman, Lowlands of Scotland, Territorial, Auxiliary and Volunteer Reserve Association.
- Robert Tear, Singer.
- Thomas James Thomson, OBE, President, Royal College of Physicians and Surgeons of Glasgow.
- Richard William Tookey, Managing Director, Shell International Marine Ltd.
- John Barrington Wain, Writer and Poet.
- Leslie James Frederick Wheeler, Regional Director, Prison Service, Home Office.
- John Herbert Wyndham Wilder, OBE, Chairman/Director, John Wilder Ltd.
- Peter Williams, Deputy Chairman and Joint Managing Director, Wedgwood plc. For services to Export.

Diplomatic Service and Overseas List

- Francis Eustace Baker, OBE, lately Chief Secretary, Falkland Islands.
- Chen Shou-lum, OBE. For public services in Hong Kong.
- Armande Cohen, lately Assistant to the Clerk, WEU Assembly, Paris.
- Malcolm Stuart Dalziel, lately British Council Representative, Egypt.
- Ivan Dawson, OBE, Speaker of the Legislative Council, British Virgin Islands.
- James Wilson Lindsay. For services to British commercial interests in Jamaica.
- David Oliver Lloyd-Jacob. For services to British cultural interests in New York.
- Gordon Menzies MacWhinnie, OBE. For public services in Hong Kong.
- Derrick Mellor, HM Ambassador, Asunción.
- Joseph Louis Pitaluga, OBE, Administration Secretary, Gibraltar.
- John Curtis Stone, lately International Staff, NATO, Brussels.
- Alan Kendrick Tyrer, lately Head of the English Translation Division, European Court of Justice, Luxembourg.
- Peter Barry Williams, OBE. For public services in Hong Kong.
- Walter James Williams, CVO, OBE, Secretary to the Cabinet, Bermuda.

Australian States

State of Queensland

- Robert Andrew Henderson. For service to the community.

==== Officer of the Order of the British Empire (OBE) ====
Military Division

Royal Navy

- Commander Peter Bell.
- Commander Jonathan Gervaise Fitzpatrick Cooke.
- Commander Edward Cecil Cottle.
- Commander Robert James Dobney.
- Lieutenant Colonel Malcolm Peter John Hunt, Royal Marines.
- Commander James Francis Perowne.
- Constructor Commander Rodney Keith Pudduck, Royal Corps of Naval Constructors.
- Commander Anthony James Roberts.
- Commander Victor George Sirett.
- Commander Arthur Peter Risien Wippell.

Army

- Lieutenant Colonel Timothy Marlow Barker (468939), The Light Infantry.
- Lieutenant Colonel John David Bromley (458352), Royal Corps of Signals.
- Acting Colonel Rex Martin Cain (389245), Army Cadet Force, Territorial Army.
- Lieutenant Colonel Christopher George Callow, (475018), Royal Army Medical Corps.
- Lieutenant Colonel John Crichton Cochrane (476788), The Royal Irish Rangers (27th (Inniskilling), 83rd and 87th).
- Lieutenant Colonel Roderick Alexander Cordy-Simpson (474830), 13th/18th Royal Hussars (Queen Mary's Own).
- Lieutenant Colonel (Staff Quartermaster) Richard William Doney, BEM, (489035), Royal Army Ordnance Corps (now R.A.R.O.).
- Lieutenant Colonel (now Colonel) Geoffrey William Field, MBE, (470066), Corps of Royal Engineers.
- Lieutenant Colonel David Hunt (466215), Royal Corps of Signals.
- Lieutenant Colonel Timothy John Rumney Illingworth (429359), The Royal Irish Rangers (27th (Inniskilling), 83rd and 87th).
- Lieutenant Colonel David William James (473983), The Royal Anglian Regiment, Territorial Army.
- Lieutenant Colonel Andrew Henry Parker Bowles (465813), The Blues and Royals (Royal Horse Guards and 1st Dragoons).
- Lieutenant Colonel Anthony David Pigott, MBE, (477816), Corps of Royal Engineers.
- Lieutenant Colonel Evan David Powell-Jones, MBE, (465821), 7th Duke of Edinburgh's Own Gurkha Rifles.
- Lieutenant Colonel (Staff Quartermaster) Walter Robins, MBE, (477338), The Duke of Wellington's Regiment (West Riding).
- Lieutenant Colonel (now Colonel) John Speight (440168), Corps of Royal Engineers.
- Lieutenant Colonel Peter Richard Hepworth Thompson, TD, (448487), Royal Corps of Signals, Territorial Army.
- Lieutenant Colonel Peter Ernest Woolley (472652), The Prince of Wales's Own Regiment of Yorkshire.

Royal Air Force

- Wing Commander David Alan Baron (4230989).
- Wing Commander Ian David Macfadyen, (608286).
- Wing Commander Douglas Paterson Mackenzie McGill (609296).
- Wing Commander Christopher John McQuillan (4335140).
- Wing Commander Alexander Cheyne Reed (2620356).
- Wing Commander Aubrey Ralph Sephton (206384), Royal Air Force Volunteer Reserve (Training).
- Wing Commander Anthony James Stables, (608592).
- Wing Commander Alan Trevor Stephens, (506507).
- Wing Commander George David Swapp, (503950), (Retired).
- Wing Commander Colin George Terry, (609306).
- Wing Commander Delfryn Williams (507075).

Civil Division

- Robert Adair, Chairman, Shetland Health Board.
- Grace Sneddon Agate, Chairman, Anglo-American Community Relations Committee for East Suffolk.
- William Annandale, Divisional Manager, Personnel Services, Warton Division, British Aerospace plc.
- Brian Edward Annis, Production Director, Needham Chalks Ltd.
- Marjorie Ada Austin. For Political and Public Service in the West Midlands.
- Geoffrey Arthur Banner, lately Director of Social Services, Wiltshire County Council.
- Grace Bannister. For services to local government in Northern Ireland.
- Douglas Reginald Barnes, Senior Lecturer in Education, University of Leeds School of Education.
- Kathleen Joan Bartlett, MBE, Director, Servite Houses.
- Robert Rowland Beal. For services to Amateur Rugby League Football.
- Charles Denis Begley, Conservator of Forests for South East England, Forestry Commission.
- Gerald Bevis, TD, Chief Probation Officer, Cheshire Probation Service.
- Marjorie Bigmore. For services to the Women's Section, Royal British Legion.
- Vivian Bird. For services to the community in Birmingham.
- Catherine Bower, Vice-Chairman, Social Services Committee, Doncaster Metropolitan Borough Council.
- Dennis Raymond Laurance Breed, Senior Principal, Paymaster General's Office.
- Ronald Brierley, MM. For public services in Manchester.
- Anthony Cecil Brown, Chairman and Managing Director, Spirax-Sarco Engineering plc.
- Henry Burlinson, Director, Thomas Kerfoot & Co. Ltd, (Pharmaceutical Manufacturers).
- The Reverend William Sydney Callaghan, Director of the Samaritans, Belfast.
- John Angus Campbell, Consultant Surgeon, Belford Hospital, Fort William.
- Malcolm Rider Campbell, President, Association of Recognised English Language Schools.
- Thomas Clark Carle, Member, Health and Safety Commission.
- Christine Muriel Chapman, Director of Advanced Nursing Studies, Welsh National School of Medicine.
- George Derek Gleeson Cheatley, Chief Executive, Northern Ireland Transport Holding Company.
- Walter Rigby Cheetham, lately Principal, National Coal Board Staff College.
- Frank Joseph John Clarke, Principal Scientific Officer, National Physical Laboratory.
- Charles Leslie Coles, VRD, lately Director, The Game Conservancy.
- Joseph Ignatius Clement Connolly, Headteacher, St. Cuthbert Mayne High School, Fulwood.
- Mary Gillieson Cook, lately Personnel Director, BIP Chemicals Ltd.
- Peter James Cook, Director, North West Europe Area, Commonwealth War Graves Commission.
- Kenneth Cooper, Chief Executive, Medway Ports Authority.
- James Trail Sinclair Corbett, Chairman and Chief Executive, Butterley Building Material Ltd.
- Brenda Agnes Cribb. For Political Service.
- Samuel Cyril Crystal, lately Medical Officer, Department of Health and Social Security.
- Hugh Norman Cunningham, Governor Class I, Northern Ireland Prison Service.
- Kenneth Graham Cure, Member (for the West Midlands), Executive Council, Amalgamated Union of Engineering Workers (Engineering Section).
- Frank Bailey Davey, Farmer, Newquay.
- Cliye Anthony Davies, Chief Executive, Information Technology Ltd.
- John Selwyn Dawson, lately Principal, Ministry of Agriculture, Fisheries and Food.
- John Cyril Desborough. For services to Parliamentary journalism.
- Beryl Alexandra Duckworth. For Political and Public Service in the North West of England.
- Trevor George William Bade, Principal, Department of Health and Social Security.
- Eric Earnshaw, Inspector, Board of Inland Revenue.
- William White Easton, Principal, Falkirk College of Technology.
- Mathieu Donald Einhorn. For Political and Public Service in Yorkshire.
- John Retter Elliott, Company Transport Adviser, Metal Box plc.
- Andrew Steven Ellis. For Political Service.
- Richard Ernst Eurich, Artist.
- David Lloyd Carey-Evans. For services to agriculture.
- Peter William Vernon Evans, Senior Adviser Primary, Stockport Local Education Authority.
- William Thomas Ewing, Registrar, New University of Ulster.
- Hugh Fairlie, Chairman, Scottish Council for Research in Education.
- Desmond Hugh Ferrett, Assistant Collector, Board of Customs and Excise.
- James Fleming, Principal Professional Technology Officer, Ministry of Defence.
- Robin Anthony Fletcher, DSC. For services to Hockey.
- Richard Stanley Francis (Dick Francis), Author.
- William Grant Paton Fraser, TD, Non-Executive Board Member, South of Scotland Electricity Board.
- Alfred Oscar Henry Gale, Deputy Managing Director, Bristol Division, Dynamics Group, British Aerospace plc. For services to Export.
- Margaret Emma Gardner, Member, Fareham Borough Council.
- Mary Garland, Area Organiser, South West Counties, Women's Royal Voluntary Service.
- Albert Raymond Gerrard, lately Vice-Chairman, Civil Service Retirement Fellowship.
- Marie Henriette Goossens, Harpist.
- Donald Gossop, Member, Food, Drink and Packaging Machinery Sector Working Party.
- Norman Lancelot Green, Member, Solihull Metropolitan Borough Council.
- Malcolm Gregory, Ironstone Consultant, Department of the Environment.
- Colonel Markham Baseley Hales, TD, DL, (Retd.), Chairman, East Anglia, Territorial Auxiliary and Volunteer Reserve Association.
- Phyllis May Hallett, Curator Grade C, National Maritime Museum.
- Arthur John Benjamin Halliday, Farmer, Countisbury, Devon.
- John Short Happel, General Medical Practitioner, Alresford, Hampshire.
- Norman Alexander John Harry, Executive Director/Chief Designer, Marshalls of Cambridge (Engineering).
- Geoffrey William Hart, Chairman, Regional Land Drainage Committee, Severn Trent Water Authority.
- Lieutenant Commander John Edwin Ernest Denny Haward, DSC, Royal Navy (Retd.), Chairman, Borders and Lothian War Pensions Committee; National Pensions Officer, Royal British Legion, Scotland.
- Philip Richard Hayward, Consultant, RHM Agriculture Ltd.
- Captain Ronald Hedger, Group Safety Officer and Marine Superintendent, Houlder Offshore Ltd.
- Captain Oscar William James Henderson, DL, Chairman, Ulster Sheltered Employment Ltd.
- Kenneth Ralph Henshaw, Chairman, Middle East Navigation Aids Service.
- John Herbert, Headmaster, Llisweri Comprehensive School, Newport.
- Christian Mary, The Dowager Lady Hesketh, DL. For services to the community in Northamptonshire.
- Geoffrey Roger Holland, Leader of Covent Garden Planning Team, Greater London Council.
- Peter John Hurford, Organist.
- Angela Ray Haygarth Jackson, Manager, Literature Services Section, Pharmaceuticals Division, Imperial Chemical Industries plc.
- Patricia Ann Jellicoe (Mrs. Mayne). For services to Drama.
- Alun Parry Jones, District Medical Officer, Somerset District Health Authority.
- Doreen Mary Kaufman, Member, East Surrey Health Authority.
- The Reverend Canon James Goldsworthy Keane, Chairman, Council for Wales of Voluntary Youth Services.
- John Stobart Keith, Senior Treasurer, Corporation of the Sons of the Clergy.
- William Francis Kennedy Kerr, Principal, Belfast College of Technology.
- John Keyte, Secretary, Police Superintendents' Association of England and Wales.
- John James Killoran, QFSM, Chief Officer, Devon Fire Brigade.
- Robert Love Lamming, TD, Consultant Surgeon and Surgeon to the Lieutenant Governor's Household, Isle of Man.
- Samuel Flanders Langlands, Managing Director, Richard Dunston Industries Ltd.
- Mary Laurence, Chief Nursing Officer, West Lambeth Health Authority.
- Henry Lawton, Head of Laboratories, Windscale, United Kingdom Atomic Energy Authority.
- Peter Layfield, General Manager, Tyne & Wear Metro.
- Professor John Court Levy, Director, Professional Institutions, The Engineering Council.
- Arthur Stanley Livingstone, lately Professor of Overseas Administrative Studies, University of Manchester.
- Harry Lockley, Headmaster, Wodensborough High School, Sandwell, West Midlands.
- John David William Low, Deputy Director, National Society for the Prevention of Cruelty to Children.
- Arnold Richard Lyons, formerly Senior Consultant Radiotherapist, Belvoir Park Hospital, Belfast.
- Elinore Muriel MacArthur, Member, Bedfordshire and Cambridgeshire Area Manpower Board.
- William Fulton Beith McKay (Fulton Mackay), Actor.
- Beatrice Stella McKerrow, County Secretary, Greater London Branch, Soldiers', Sailors' and Airmen's Families Association.
- Ian James Arthur McKittrick. For services to the Justices' Clerks' Society.
- Christine Grace MacWilliam. For Political and Public Service in Scotland.
- William Ian Malcolm, Chairman, Tay River Purification Board.
- William Charles Howard Maloney, Deputy Special Project Director, Ministry of Defence.
- Bertie Mee. For services to Association Football.
- Andrew Copeland Meikle, lately HM Deputy Chief Inspector of Prisons, Scottish Home and Health Department.
- Elizabeth Aitken Meikle, Chief Administrative Pharmaceutical Officer, Greater Glasgow Health Board.
- Richard Metcalfe, Chairman and Managing Director, Davies & Metcalfe plc. For services to Export.
- John Edwin Midwinter, Head of Division, Research Laboratories, British Telecom.
- Innes Miller, Chairman, Red Deer Commission.
- Commander William Ronald Miller, Royal Navy (Retd.), lately Clerk to the Worshipful Company of Haberdashers.
- Robert Mitchell, Member, Greater London Council.
- Stuart Gordon Mole. For Political Service.
- John Arthur Moncrieff, lately Headmaster, North Kelvinside Secondary School, Glasgow.
- Sidney Frank Neal, MBE, Secretary General, Royal Air Forces Association.
- Michael John Neale, Director, Michael Neale & Associates Ltd.
- Kenneth Malcolm Odell, Executive Director, Balfour Beatty Engineering Ltd. For services to Export.
- Peter Patrick O'Donnell, Principal Professional Technology Officer, Department of the Environment.
- Ronald Edward Derek Onions, lately Editorial Director, London Broadcasting Company Ltd.
- Raymond Godfrey Owen. For services to local government in Gwent.
- Ronald Owen, Medical Adviser, Trades Union Congress.
- George Frederick Owens, District Administrator, Cornwall and Isles of Scilly Health Authority.
- Anthony Charles Baird-Parker, Manager, Microbiology and Preservation Department, Research Division, Unilever Ltd.
- Jean Peel, lately Senior Principal, Ministry of Defence.
- Alan George Phillips, Deputy Secretary-General, Royal Society for Mentally Handicapped Children and Adults.
- Leslie Herbert Quilter, Principal, Department of Trade and Industry.
- Graham Reynolds. For services to Art.
- John George Laycock Rhodes, Development Director, TMC Ltd.
- Samuel Richards, District Nursing Officer, Trafford Health Authority.
- George William Riddell, lately Vice-Principal, Jordanhill College of Education.
- Ann Leyland Rippon. For Political and Public Service in the North of England.
- Mollie Roberts, Headteacher, Campion School, Leamington Spa.
- The Reverend Canon James Smith Robertson, lately General Secretary, United Society for the Propagation of the Gospel.
- Commander Ronald Douglas Ross, Royal Navy (Retd.), Clerk to The Vintners Company.
- Peter Rowley, Managing Director, Michelin (Rubber Purchasing) Ltd.
- Henry Charles Sanderson, ERD, Director, Freight, British Rail.
- Margaret Johnson Shaw, Member, Cambridgeshire County Council.
- William Short, Chairman, National Industrial Fuel Efficiency Service Ltd.
- Jack Arthur Shrimpton. For Political and Public Service in the Greater London Area.
- Clifford Houghton Singleton, Chief Executive, Blackburn Borough Council.
- Alfred Clough Smith. For Political and Public Service in Yorkshire.
- Allen Donald Warren Smith, County Surveyor, Kent County Council.
- Bernard Thomas Smith, lately Senior Principal, HM Treasury.
- William Smith, Chief Driving Examiner, Department of Transport.
- Lieutenant Colonel William Garlington Snape, Secretary, British Red Shield Services, UK and BAOR, Salvation Army.
- Charles Sneddon, Depute Chairman, Scottish Special Housing Association.
- Derek Spice, Managing Director, Pandair Freight plc.
- George Robert Gordon Stewart, Secretary, Institute of Chartered Accountants of Scotland.
- Sydney Andrew Stewart, Director, Voluntary Service Bureau, Belfast.
- Geoffrey Gordon Street, lately Principal, Ministry of Defence.
- Charles William Swift, Member, Peterborough Development Corporation.
- Myles McDermott Tempany, Bursar, King's College London.
- Alec Geoffrey Thompson, Vice Chairman, J. Bibby & Sons plc.
- Ronald Tilbury, MBE, Chairman, Trustee Savings Bank (South East).
- William Anthony Toner, Joint Managing Director, Farrans (Construction) Ltd.
- Anna Millicent Horatia Fitzroy Tribe. For Political and Public Service in Wales.
- George Edward Michael Trinick, Regional Director, Cornwall Region, The National Trust.
- Arthur Max Turner. For Political and Public Service in the East Midlands.
- Dennis Cyril Underdown, Chief Constructor, Ministry of Defence.
- Roger Hugh Underhill, Director-General, The Advertising Association.
- John Vallins, Headmaster, Chetham's School of Music, Manchester.
- Jennifer Mary Veale. For Political and Public Service in the West of England.
- Robert George Perceval Voss, Head of Engineering Division, Science and Engineering Research Council.
- Hilary Anne Wadlow. For Political and Public Service in the Wessex Area.
- Daniel Dempsey Wallace, TD. For Political and Public Service in the West Midlands.
- Alan Walmsley, HM Inspector of Schools, Department of Education and Science.
- Philip Alan Walters, Senior Principal, Department of the Environment.
- Margaret Auriol Watkin. For services to the magistracy in Wales.
- Harold Webb. For Political Service in the North West of England.
- Reginald James Webb, QPM, Superintendent, Police Convalescent Home, Harrogate.
- Professor Derek Thomas Edward Williams, Director, Health Services Management Centre, Birmingham University.
- Baruch Harold Wood. For services to Chess.
- Alfred Sydney Worrall, Headmaster, Helston School, Cornwall.
- Arthur Robert Donald Wright, lately Appointments Secretary to the Archbishops of Canterbury and York.
- Ronald James Wylie, Chief Executive, Tullis Russell & Co. Ltd.

Diplomatic Service and Overseas List

- Dennis Oldrieve Amy, lately First Secretary (Commercial), HM Embassy, Santiago.
- Jack Bates. For services to British commercial interests in Egypt.
- Duncan Robert Yorke Bluck. For public Services in Hong Kong.
- Noel Brownhill. For services to British commercial interests in The Gambia.
- John Wilson Carswell, FRCS. For medical services to the community in Uganda.
- The Honourable Dr. Ruth Evelyn Coggan. For medical services to the community in the NWFP, Pakistan.
- Andrew Richmond Dickson. For services to the British community in Bangladesh.
- William Alan Ferguson, lately Financial Secretary, Montserrat.
- Michael Colin Foot, British Council Representative, Bangladesh.
- Air Commodore Harry Fenner Glover (Retd.) For services to British aviation interests in Oman.
- George William Gould, lately HM Consul, British Consulate, Cape Town.
- Norman Edgar Griffin. For services to the British community in Jordan.
- James Hamer. For services to British aviation interests in Saudi Arabia.
- John Phillip Harniman, Cultural Attache (British Council), HM Embassy, Bucharest.
- Arnott Cassidy Jackson. For public services in Bermuda.
- Bernard Trevor Keene. For services to British commercial interests in Canada.
- James Young Keanie Kerr, Education Adviser (British Council), Government of Malaysia.
- John Fraser Leigh, Manager, Ports Authority, The Gambia.
- Ian Forbes McCredie, lately First Secretary, British Interests Section, Royal Swedish Embassy, Tehran.
- Frank MacLeod. For services to British commercial and community interests in Sierra Leone.
- Bertram James Nelson, HM Consul-General, British Consulate-General, Antwerp.
- Patrick Michael Nixon, lately Executive Director, British Information Services, New York.
- Percy Leonard Norris, lately First Secretary (Commercial), HM Embassy, Dubai.
- Kenneth George Old. For educational services to the community in Gujranwala, Pakistan.
- Ormond Lauder Panton. For public services in the Cayman Islands.
- Derek Gilbert Pass. For services to British commercial and community interests in Mexico.
- John Edgar Peacock, Director, Royal Observatory, Hong Kong.
- John Potter. For services to British commercial and community interests in Nigeria.
- Mary Richardson, lately Chief of Section, UNESCO, Paris.
- Nigel Anthony Rigg. For public and community services in Hong Kong.
- Clarence Roy Smith, lately Chief of Division, ESCAP, United Nations Organisation, Bangkok.
- The Reverend George Richmond Naismith Smith. For services to the Ecumenical movement in Geneva.
- Andrew So Kwok-wing. For public services in Hong Kong.
- Leslie Lothian Sung. For public services in Hong Kong.
- Tang Hsiang-chien. For public services in Hong Kong.
- Alan Leonard Varley, lately International Staff, NATO, Brussels.
- Lawrence Edward Walker, MVO, MBE, First Secretary (Commercial), HM Embassy, Baghdad.
- Donald Walter Francis Warren-Knott, First Secretary and Consul, HM Embassy, Tokyo.
- James Michael Scott Whittell, British Council Representative, Algeria.
- Gwilym Williams. For services to British commercial interests in Belgium.
- Gordon Wilson. For services to British commercial and community interests in Jordan.
- David Alan Wright, lately HM Consul, British Consulate, Durban.

Australian States

State of Queensland

- Joan Estelle Godfrey, Head of Department of Nursing Studies, Queensland Institute of Technology.
- John McGillivray McIntyre. For services to engineering and the community.
- Alan Frederick Sherlock. For service to Scouting.
- Ralph Stafford. For service to the community and local government.
- Ross Brian Taylor. For service to the community.

State of Tasmania

- Right Reverend Henry Allingham Jerrim. For services to religion and the community.

==== Member of the Order of the British Empire (MBE) ====
Military Division

Royal Navy

- Lieutenant Commander Derek James Anthony.
- Lieutenant Commander Dennis Lionel Ashton.
- Lieutenant Commander Edgar John Beadsmoore.
- Fleet Chief Marine Engineering Artificer (P) Graham Melvin Biggs, K965258W.
- Lieutenant Commander Derek Edward Brock.
- Fleet Chief Marine Engineering Mechanic (M) Henry Christopher Burke, K913386S.
- Lieutenant Commander Timothy George Casey.
- Warrant Officer First Class Patrick Roy Chapman, Royal Marines, PO18990P.
- First Officer Gwendolen Beatrice Emily Hayward, Women's Royal Naval Reserve.
- Senior Radio Officer Kenneth Henderson, Royal Fleet Auxiliary.
- Lieutenant Commander Desmond Joseph Hughes.
- Lieutenant Commander Michael David Kooner.
- Lieutenant Edward Roderick O'Regan.
- Lieutenant Commander (CCF) Nicholas Michael Haydon Prosser, Royal Naval Reserve.
- Lieutenant Commander John Desmond Pugh.
- First Radio Officer Anthony Robert Rye, Royal Fleet Auxiliary.
- Lieutenant Commander Philip Edward Worthington.

Army

- Major John Graham Baker (482682), Corps of Royal Engineers.
- Captain (Quartermaster) Leonard David Brown (502918), The Devonshire and Dorset Regiment.
- 23131498 Warrant Officer Class 2 Dennis Cady-Would, The Queen's Regiment, Territorial Army.
- Captain (now Major) Geoffrey Charles Cardozo (492210), 4th/7th Royal Dragoon Guards.
- Acting Major Stanley Collinson (344452), Army Cadet Force, Territorial Army.
- Major Peter Richard Courtney-Green (479200), Royal Army Ordnance Corps.
- Major (Quartermaster) Raymond Cowap (497886), Irish Guards.
- Acting Major Gordon Richard Crack (367860), Army Cadet Force, Territorial Army.
- 23672246 Warrant Officer Class 1 David Hamilton Dodd, Army Catering Corps (now discharged).
- 22465506 Warrant Officer Class 1 Alexander Dumon, Coldstream Guards.
- Major Peter Jeffrey Durrant (487481), The Gloucestershire Regiment.
- LS/23481505 Warrant Officer Class 2 Alan James Dutton, 16th/ 5th The Queen's Royal Lancers.
- Major John Arnold Eden (437055), Royal Regiment of Artillery.
- Major Nigel Stuart Ford (498213), Corps of Royal Electrical and Mechanical Engineers.
- 23862253 Warrant Officer Class 1 Thomas James Friend, Royal Corps of Signals.
- Major David Hugh Godsal (487496), The Royal Green Jackets.
- Major David Keith Harris, TD, (483629), The Royal Anglian Regiment, Territorial Army.
- Major Michael John Hurst, TD, (460403), Royal Army Pay Corps, Territorial Army.
- 23830957 Warrant Officer Class 2 William Francis Kelly, Royal Regiment of Artillery.
- Major (Queen's Gurkha Officer) Lalbahadur Rai, MVO, (489159), 7th Duke of Edinburgh's Own Gurkha Rifles.
- 22551521 Warrant Officer Class 1 Angus MacDonald, Scots Guards (now discharged).
- Major Roderick Macdonald (485776), Corps of Royal Engineers.
- W/416795 Warrant Officer Class 1 Doreen Mapley, Women's Royal Army Corps.
- Major Rodney Maxwell (479296), Royal Corps of Transport
- 22527101 Warrant Officer Class 2 Reuben Milestone, Corps of Royal Engineers, Territorial Army.
- Major (Quartermaster) Brian Douglas Morgan (500603), Welsh Guards.
- Major (now Lieutenant Colonel) Charles William Pagan, TD, (480108), Corps of Royal Engineers, Territorial Army.
- Major (Queen's Gurkha Officer) Piarelal Thapa (488891), 6th Queen Elizabeth's Own Gurkha Rifles.
- Major Ian Ralph Picton (433213), Royal Regiment of Artillery.
- Major Robert Campbell Bell Ritchie (498224), The Black Watch (Royal Highland Regiment).
- Major Ian Kenneth Russell, TD, (471748), Corps of Royal Engineers, Territorial Army.
- 23714986 Warrant Officer Class 1 Malcolm Simpson, The Parachute Regiment.
- Major (Director of Music) Edward Brian Smith (497111), Royal Military Academy Band Corps.
- Major Henry John Smith (480069), Army Catering Corps.
- Major Simon Marcus Perrin Stewart (483553), 1st The Queen's Dragoon Guards.
- 24075472 Warrant Officer Class 1 John Carstairs Thomson, Royal Army Ordnance Corps.
- 23862098 Warrant Officer Class 2 Alan Leslie Viner, Royal Army Medical Corps (now discharged).
- Major William Matthew Walton (490424), 17th/21st Lancers (now Retired).
- Major John Patrick O'Farrell Webster (484054), The Gloucestershire Regiment.
- Captain Peter Gage Williams (491671), Coldstream Guards.
- Major Patrick McVicker Wilson (494996), Army Air Corps.
- Major Jonathan William Askew Woodall (482877), 4th/7th Royal Dragoon Guards.

Overseas Award

- Major Ip Tai-Tung, Royal Hong Kong Regiment (The Volunteers).

Royal Air Force

- Squadron Leader (now Wing Commander) Martin Edward Blunkell (2618274).
- Squadron Leader Terence Darlow (578072).
- Squadron Leader Frederick Gordon Gates (4030484).
- Squadron Leader Keith Brian Harris (350389), (Retired).
- Squadron Leader James Holland (1785282) Royal Air Force Volunteer Reserve (Training).
- Squadron Leader Leonard James Marshall (687828).
- Squadron Leader David John Birkett Pierce (609146).
- Squadron Leader John Rolls (583369).
- Squadron Leader Terry Bertram James Saunders (3504865).
- Squadron Leader Stephanus Gysbertus Schreuder (167791), Royal Auxiliary Air Force.
- Squadron Leader Alan Turner, (4335638).
- Flight Lieutenant Stewart Blackburn (1961658).
- Flight Lieutenant David Bruce Glen Downey (4143090).
- Flight Lieutenant Albert Arthur John Emmins (3109862), Royal Air Force Volunteer Reserve (Training).
- Flight Lieutenant Ronald Samuel Frewin (2393376), Royal Air Force Volunteer Reserve (Training).
- Flight Lieutenant Terence Edward Luckhurst (684253).
- Flight Lieutenant Barry Anthony Steen (4280611).
- Flight Lieutenant Bryan Henry Trunkfield (3090573), Royal Air Force Volunteer Reserve (Training).
- Warrant Officer Geoffrey Richard Bland (J1927979).
- Warrant Officer Norman Stanley Everard (L4010973).
- Warrant Officer John Joseph Giblin (S4195914).
- Warrant Officer Douglas Russell, BEM, (T4003452).
- Warrant Officer Dennis Kerrison Smith (B0587728).
- Warrant Officer Michael James Olney-Smith (X4158812).

Civil Division

- Frederick Charles Stanley Adcock, Station Secretary, Institute of Hydrology, Natural Environment Research Council.
- Freda Allen, Nursing Officer (Matron), Mid-Surrey Health Authority.
- Stanley William Alsop, Assistant Manager, Navy, Army and Air Force Institutes.
- Jennifer Anderson, Special Services Superintendent, Terminal 3, British Airways.
- Jessie Helen Angoy, Executive Officer, Department of Health and Social Security.
- Peter Frederick Annis, Operations Manager, Product Support, Ansty, Rolls-Royce Ltd.
- Dorothy Mary Ansell, lately District Nurse, Kirkstall, Leeds.
- Ronald Aston, Senior Executive Officer, Department of Employment.
- Thomas Albert Atherton, BEM, lately Chief Ambulance Officer, Leicestershire Health Authority.
- Peter Ayles, Director, Operations, Saudi Arabia, British Hovercraft Corporation Ltd.
- Julian Knighton Badcock, AE, General Manager and Secretary, London Port Employers' Association.
- Margaret May Baker. For services to the Pontypool Citizens' Advice Bureau.
- Maurice Alvey Ball, Manager, Research and Development, Sifam Ltd.
- Conway Egerton Barkway, Senior Executive Officer, Board of Customs and Excise.
- Emma Kathleen Barnett, Superintendent, Royal Ulster Constabulary.
- Peter George Barnwell, Chairman and Managing Director, CorinTech Ltd.
- Michael Geoffrey Baron, Vice-President, National Autistic Society.
- Margaret Jane Fortune Barrowcliff. For services to district nursing in Bexleyheath, Kent.
- Joseph Bautista, Higher Executive Officer, HM Dockyard, Gibraltar, Ministry of Defence.
- William James Baxter, Ship Repair General Manager, Belfast, Harland & Wolff Ltd.
- Derek Grisdale Bewick, Production Director, Dorman Smith Fuses Ltd.
- John Reader Blackton, Chairman, Walbrook Housing Association Ltd.
- Robert Westrup Glenny Blair, Senior Technical Liaison Engineer, Product Support Division, Smiths Industries Aerospace & Defence Systems Company.
- John William James Bollom, Managing Director, J. W. Bollom & Co. Ltd.
- Darius Faridoon Boomla, General Medical Practitioner, Plumstead, London.
- Vera Grace Boyton, Senior Personal Secretary, Ministry of Defence.
- Barbara Bradbury, Industrial Promotion Officer, Doncaster Metropolitan Borough Council.
- Maurice Sheldon Brewer, Senior Executive Officer, Board of Inland Revenue.
- David Charles Brice, BEM, Assistant Secretary, Technical Regulations Department, Institution of Electrical Engineers.
- Joan Ellen Broughton, Deputy Director, British Knitting Export Council and Director, British Menswear Guild. For services to Export.
- Donald Ian Brown, Headteacher, Badsley Moor Junior School, Rotherham.
- Emily Llewelyn Brown. For services to the community in Rye.
- Richard John Butler Bryson, District Physiotherapist, Highland Health Board.
- Walter Ernest Bunney, Head of Department, Montgomery College of Further Education.
- Brian William. Butler, Deputy Assistant Chief Officer, London Fire Brigade.
- Edward Buxton. For services to cancer relief in North Staffordshire.
- John Sidney Caisley. For Political and Public Service in the Wessex Area.
- Stanley Cardwell. For services to the Ramblers Association in North Yorkshire and South Durham.
- John Martin Carrington, Group Engineer (Construction), West Midlands Regional Office, Warwickshire County Council.
- Owen Clark Carter, Contracts Manager, Wilton, Imperial Chemical Industries.
- Albert Douglas Caunt, Senior Divisional Officer, Nottinghamshire Fire Service.
- Gordon England Cawthorne, Detective Superintendent, Metropolitan Police.
- Musa Charles Elliott Cazaly, Instructor, London Central Junior Boys' Attendance Centre.
- James Henry Chapman, Head of Administrative Services, Secretary's Department, Luton Borough Council.
- Thomas Chapman. For services to the community in Clwyd.
- Trevor Almer Claffey, General Manager, International Sales, Bridgeport Machine Division, Textron Ltd. For services to Export.
- Robert Coats, lately Consultant, John Brown Engineering plc.
- David John Coffey, Chief Wireless Technician, Police Authority, Northern Ireland.
- Clifford Isaac Cole. For services to the Royal British Legion in Wales.
- George Henry Collicutt, lately Editor, Wiltshire and Gloucestershire Standard.
- Bridget Condron, Director of Nursing Services, Barnes Hospital, Central Manchester Health Authority.
- Ralph Simpson Connelly. For services to Housing Associations in the North East.
- Albert Edward Cook, Senior Executive Officer, Department for National Savings.
- Ernest Copley, District Delegate, General, Municipal, Boilermakers and Allied Trades Union.
- Samuel Cahoon Cowan, General Secretary, Ulster Savings Committee.
- Maurice Cox, Region Collector, Board of Inland Revenue.
- Denis Edward Lakey Cozens, Works Director, Haling Beck Ltd.
- Margaret Marilyn Craig, Vice President, Road Safety Council of Northern Ireland; Member, RoSPA National Road Safety Committee.
- Eileen Chris, Lady Crofton, Medical Director, Scottish Committee of Action on Smoking and Health.
- Hugh Thomson Crooks. For services to the Shetland Times.
- Anne Crumbie, Assistant Branch Director, Director of Medical Aid Department, Leicestershire Branch, British Red Cross Society.
- Peter Cunningham, Organising Secretary, Dorset Association of Boys' Clubs. Director, Poole and Dorset Adventure Centre.
- Gertrude Kathleen Czudej, Higher Executive Officer, Home Office.
- Frederick Daly. For services to Golf.
- Angus Davidson, Chief Superintendent, Strathclyde Police.
- Lawrence Demmy. For services to Ice Dancing.
- William John Devine. For Political Service in the West Midlands.
- Ronald George De Young, Higher Executive Officer, Department of Health and Social Security.
- Arthur Matson Dines, Member, Executive Committee, British Beekeepers' Association.
- Dennis Peter Dingle, Senior Executive Officer, Department of Transport.
- Thomas Dingsdale, Senior Training Instructor, Capper Neil Training Workshops, St. Helens.
- Teresa Margaret Dunn, Senior Housing Officer (Warden Services), Stockport Metropolitan Borough Council.
- David John Dunnett. Joint Managing Director, D. & P. Builders.
- Margaret Easton, lately Naval Families Visitor, HMS Pembroke.
- Evan Rees Ebenezer, Executive Officer, Welsh Office.
- Albert John Edwards, AFM, Executive Officer, Home Office.
- Michael Keith MacLean Forbes Egleston, lately Secretary, Heritage Education Group.
- Gordon Elliott, Managing Director, R. B. Bolton (Mining Engineers) Ltd.
- Ivy Ethel Mary Elliott, District Nurse, Florencecourt, Co. Fermanagh.
- Amy Emms, Traditional Durham Quilter.
- Mya Lloyd Evans, Assistant Information Officer, Central Office of Information.
- Barbara Everitt, Voluntary Civil Defence Organiser, Essex.
- Richard Michael Eyres, AE. For services to the Royal Air Forces Association in Scotland.
- John Michael Denison Fairbarns, Higher Executive Officer, Board of Customs and Excise.
- Captain David Ogilvy Fairlie, DL. For services to the Scout Association in Scotland.
- Spencer William Farrow, Estate Manager, National Institute for Biological Standards and Control.
- Alexander Findlay, Vice-Chairman, Lothian Health Board.
- William John Fisher, General Manager, Electronics Division, Newport, Standard Telephones and Cables plc.
- William Fitzsimmons, Superintendent of Works, St. Andrew's College of Education, Glasgow.
- Janet Stratton Flannigan, Assistant Headteacher, Glenwood High School, Glenrothes.
- Malcolm Stanley Fletcher, Principal Associate, Sir William Halcrow & Partners.
- Lewis Albert Flood, Senior Executive Officer, Crown Office for Scotland.
- Peter Celestine Flynn, Regional Plant Manager, Tarmac Construction Plant.
- Martin Estwick Ford, Chief Petroleum Engineer, British Gas Corporation.
- Brynmor Foster, Accountancy Assistant, Milford Haven Conservancy Board.
- Dennis Henry Fox, Leader, Northavon District Council.
- Richard Roland Fox, Senior Teacher, Haling Manor High School, Croydon.
- George Smith Francey, Chief Forester, Forestry Commission.
- Helen Francis, Registered Foster Parent, Gloucestershire County Council.
- Adrian Francis Fryers, Higher Executive Officer, House of Lords.
- Ronald Patrick Gadd, RD, Secretary, Aerodrome Owners Association.
- Margaret Teresa Gallagher, Member, Police Authority for Northern Ireland.
- Christopher John Ballard Gardiner. For services to disabled people in Hampshire.
- Dorothy Gardiner, Senior Partner, Gardiner's Nursing Agency.
- Doris Cicely Gash, Founder and Operator, Tilehurst Animal and Bird Sanctuary.
- Peter Gibson. For services to the conservation of stained glass.
- Percy Roland Gill, Engineering Manager, Calder Works, Sellafield, British Nuclear Fuels Ltd.
- Chris Lucas Gittins, Actor and Broadcaster.
- Marjorie Emily Gleed, Secretary, The Royal Society of Musicians of Great Britain.
- Andrewina Goodman. For Political and Public Service in the East Midlands.
- George Campbell Graham, Managing Director, Islay Farmers Ltd.
- Philip Grant, Manager, Maltby Parkgate Colliery, South Yorkshire Area, National Coal Board.
- John Gray, Director of Housing, Newcastle upon Tyne City Council.
- Joan Mary Green, Branch Secretary, Wolverhampton Branch, Workers' Educational Association.
- Alec Leonard Greene. For Political Service in Yorkshire.
- Eileen Julia Gregory, Personal Assistant, British Broadcasting Corporation.
- Captain Lenord Hanson Grey, lately Master, Esso Petroleum Co.
- Robert John Hunnybun Guy, Chairman, Dudley and Sandwell Committee for the Employment of Disabled People.
- Gwynfryn Noah Gwilym, lately General Manager, Effemex Division, Mars Ltd. For services to Export.
- James Rutherford Hall, Controller, Operations and Marketing, Scottish Postal Board, Post Office.
- Mary Patricia Hall, Chairman, Duke of Edinburgh Award Committee, Poole.
- William Aiken Hamilton, Charge Nurse and Acting Nursing Officer, Bannvale Hospital, Gilford. Co. Down.
- William John Hamilton, Chief Superintendent, Royal Ulster Constabulary.
- Alice Dovey Hampson. For Political and Public Service in the North West of England.
- Henry Derick Powell Hanks. For services to agriculture in South Glamorgan.
- Violet Ida Hardman. For services to disabled people, particularly in Leatherhead.
- Agnes Anderson Lawson Hargreaves. For services to the community in Hapton, Lancashire.
- Eric David Harper. For Political Service in Scotland.
- Doreen Harris, Founder Member, Ileostomy Association of Great Britain and Ireland; Organiser, Midland Division.
- Douglas Ashton Hart, Professional and Technology Officer I, Department of the Environment.
- Arthur Edward Oliver George Hawkins, Senior Buyer, Military Engine Group, Bristol Engine Group, Rolls-Royce Ltd.
- Cynthia May Haydon. For services to Equestrianism.
- Alfred Arthur Heaver, Professional and Technology Officer I, Metropolitan Police.
- Michael Robert Hendra, Member, Northern Ireland Paraplegic Association.
- John Ewart Hepburn. For Political and Public Service in Scotland.
- Jeffrey Hepworth, Chief Inspector, Northumbria Police.
- Audrey Elliott Herman, lately Headmistress, Wexham Park Hospital School, Slough.
- Lucien Ingram Raven-Hill. For services to the Institute of Legal Executives.
- David Dennison George Hodge, Director, D. G. Hodge & Son Ltd.
- Brenda Hodgson, Personnel Assistant, Personnel Records, T. J. Smith & Nephew Ltd.
- Captain Thomas Duncan Muir Hopcroft (Retd.), County Secretary, The Forces Help Society and Lord Roberts Workshops, Kent.
- Maurice Hope. For services to Boxing.
- Geoffrey Morgan Hopkin, lately Divisional Scientist, Taff Division, Welsh Water Authority.
- Philip Albert Hoskins, Secretary-General, Luton and District Chamber of Commerce and Industry.
- Dorothy Joan Hughes, County Organiser, Northumberland Women's Royal Voluntary Service.
- Denis Raymond Hurford, Manager, Department of Health and Social Security.
- William Stanley Irwin, Chief Superintendent, Royal Ulster Constabulary.
- Margaret Helen Jeffrey, General Secretary, Sandes Soldiers' and Airmen's Homes, Northern Ireland.
- Moyra Brake Jenkin, lately Higher Executive Officer, Ministry of Defence.
- Robert Frederick Johnson, Chairman and Member, British Standards Institute Committees.
- Frances Eleanor Mon Jones, Peripatetic Music Teacher, Powys.
- Rosemary Patricia Kyffin Jones, Senior Executive Officer Department of Health and Social Security.
- Sylvia Jones, Headteacher, Ysgol Delyn, Mold, Clwyd.
- Wilfred Irving Jordan. For services to the Gloucester Schools Athletic Association.
- Reggie Kaye, lately Assistant Chief Engineer, West Riding Automobile Company Ltd.
- Doris Mary Keeler, Nursing Officer (Out-Patient Department), Charing Cross Hospital, Hammersmith and Fulham Health Authority.
- Mary Elizabeth Kennedy, Brigade Secretary, Northern Ireland Division, the Girls' Brigade.
- William Haydn Kingman. For services to the community in Matlock, Derbyshire.
- Antony John Knapman, lately Chief Clerk, Customs Annuity and Benevolent Fund Incorporated.
- Lucille Lam, Senior Personal Secretary, Privy Council Office.
- Ernest Eaton Laughton. For services to the National Federation of SubPostmasters.
- Frederick Lawrence, Chairman, League of Friends, Winchfield and Odiham Hospitals, North Hampshire Health Authority.
- Gina Levete. For services to disabled people.
- Hugh Peter Meredith Lewis, TD, DL. For Political and Public Service in Powys.
- William Alexander Lewis, President, Institution of Waste Management; Chief Cleansing Officer, Dundee City.
- John Muir Lindsay, Export Sales Manager, R. & W. Scott Ltd., Carluke.
- Doreen May Lines, Regional Collector of Taxes, Board of Inland Revenue.
- Joseph Albert Lloyd. For Political and Public Service in Wales.
- Robert Lockyer, DFC, lately Executive Officer, Department of Health and Social Security.
- John Lumley, Chief Commandant, North Yorkshire Special Constabulary.
- Mary Barbara McHugo, Senior Map Officer, Overseas Development Administration.
- Robert Erskine McKendrick. For services to Dairy Cattle Breeding.
- James Michael McLellan, Chief Architect, Waverley District Council.
- Agnes MacLeod, lately District Nurse, Scalpay.
- Malcolm Macleod. For services to crofting in the Isle of Lewis.
- Ian McMurtrie, lately Assistant Firemaster, Lothian and Borders Fire Brigade.
- William John McNeill. For Political and Public Service in the South of England.
- James Macrae, lately Member, Western Isles Islands Council.
- Yvonne Mary Maling. For Political and Public Service in the North of England.
- Eric William Mallion, Headmaster, St. Mary's Church of England Primary School, Islington.
- David William Mann, Headmaster, Black Horse Hill Junior School, West Kirby.
- Valerie Ellen Martin, Director of Nursing Services, South Gwent.
- Vera Florence Martin, Executive Officer, Department of the Environment.
- Canon Lancelot Mason, Chairman, Friends of Rampton Hospital, Nottinghamshire.
- George John Matthews, Professional and Technology Officer II, Royal Observatory, Edinburgh.
- Ronald Matthews, Manager, Chronometer Shop, Thomas Mercer Chronometers Ltd.
- Thomas Albert Matthews, Member, Leominster District Council.
- Arnold Stanley May, lately University Binder, University of Manchester.
- Betty Mary Ferguson May, Administrative Officer, Headquarters Secretariat, Commonwealth Parliamentary Association.
- Thomas Harris Peter Dornford-May, Senior County Drama Organiser, Cheshire County Council.
- Margaret Anne Midson, Personal Secretary, Land Settlement Association.
- Royston Walter Midworth, HM Principal Inspector of Factories, Department of Employment.
- Michael Dennis Mills. For services to Association Football.
- Walter John Minty, lately Member, Southern Electricity Consultative Council.
- Mildred Monks, Area Manager, North West Region, The Housing Corporation.
- Donald Joseph Moore, lately Production Services Manager, North Western Region, Central Electricity Generating Board.
- Pierce Joseph Moore, Assistant Private Secretary to the Government Chief Whip.
- Dorothy Marie Morley, Collector, Board of Inland Revenue.
- John Edgar Moulding, Chief Engineer, Turbo-Generator Group, Brush Electrical Machines Ltd.
- Patricia Mulholland. For services to the Irish Ballet Company.
- Michael Dominic Mulroy, Superintendent, Greater Manchester Police.
- George William Harold Neish, District Organiser, Agricultural Workers' Trade Group, Transport and General Workers' Union.
- Jean Rosita Mary Nevile, County Organiser, Lincolnshire Women's Royal Voluntary Service.
- Philip Lyn Nicholas, Chief Superintendent, South Wales Constabulary.
- Ronald Leslie Nicholls, Higher Executive Officer, Department of Health and Social Security.
- Ninian Charles Niven. For Political and Public Service in the West Midlands.
- Thomas Raymond O'Brien, Inspector (O), Board of Inland Revenue.
- Michael Fowler Orchard. For Political and Public Service in the West Midlands.
- Jennifer Mary Overton, National Adviser on Playgroups in Areas of Special Need, Scottish Pre-School Playgroups Association.
- Gwendolen Brindle Jones Owen. For Public services on the Isle of Anglesey.
- Ann Sutherland Page. For Political Service.
- George Edward Parr. For services to music in Nelson.
- Thomas William Tayler Pearse, lately Senior Information Officer, Ministry of Defence.
- Arthur Pearson, Chief Executive, Ryedale District Council.
- Eric Penny, Stores Officer Grade B, Ministry of Defence.
- Phyllis Ethel Perry, lately Senior Inspector, Durham and Cleveland Group, National Society for the Prevention of Cruelty to Children.
- Derek George Stuart Petty, Headmaster, North Baddesley School, Southampton.
- Patrick Joseph Phelan, Higher Executive Officer, Department of Health and Social Security.
- Joan Margaret Pike, Senior Nurse, Bradford Royal Infirmary, Bradford Health Authority.
- John Edward Price, lately Senior Executive Officer, Lord Chancellor's Department.
- Peter John Price, Divisional Manager, Electronic Equipment and Sub Units Division, Unitech plc.
- Bernard Oliver Leathes Prior, TD, Registrar and Legal Secretary to The Bishop of Norwich.
- William Alexander Pugsley, Managing Director, SPT Machines Ltd. For services to Export.
- Janet Barclay Ramsay. For services to The Duke of Edinburgh's Award Scheme in Scotland.
- Nancy Rosemary Peace Rapaport (Mrs. Heller). For services to music education.
- Muriel Reaich, Nursing Officer, Royal Hospital and Home for Incurables, Putney, London.
- Trefor Ieuan Rees, Commissioner, Mid-Glamorgan St. John Ambulance Brigade.
- Netta Rheinberg. For services to Women's Cricket.
- John Cheetham Richards, Superannuation Officer, Severn Trent Water Authority.
- Kenneth John Richards, Chairman, South Devon Shellfishermen Ltd.
- Ronald Riordan, Professional and Technology Officer II, Ministry of Defence.
- John Mitchell Paton Ritchie, Secretary, Scottish Branch, The Royal Institution of Chartered Surveyors.
- The Reverend John David Roberts. For services to the Mission to Seamen, Falmouth.
- John Patrick Robinson, Higher Executive Officer, Director of Public Prosecutions Department.
- Raymond Thomas Robinson. For services to disabled people in Somerset.
- Roy Frederick Allen Roper, Manager, Support Group, Simulation Division, Marconi Instruments Ltd.
- William Ross, Administrative Officer, Greater Glasgow Health Board.
- Sara Juliet Salisbury. For Political and Public Service in the East of England.
- Brian George Walter Saunders, President, The British Schools' Judo Association.
- Francis William Saunders, ERD, Member, Central Regional Council.
- Jean Secker, Higher Executive Officer, Department of Employment.
- Robert Frederick Sellors, Member, Amber Valley District Council.
- James Sephton, Games Secretary, Royal Air Force Sports Board.
- Godfrey John Shrimpton, Group Commandant, No. 10 Exeter Group, Royal Observer Corps.
- Alan Silverman. For services to sheltered housing in London.
- Neville Arnold Selverston, General Medical Practitioner, Bottisham, Cambridgeshire.
- Harry Arthur Simpson, Inspector (Higher Grade), Board of Inland Revenue.
- Frederick Skentelbery, Chairman, Birkenhead Hospital League of Friends, Wirral Health Authority.
- Marjorie Winifred Smallman. For Political and Public Service in the West of England.
- Catherine Brodie Smith. For services to the blind in Derbyshire.
- John Leonard Smith, lately Headmaster, Seymour Park Primary School, Old Trafford.
- Joyce Esther, Mrs. Smith. For services to Athletics.
- Kathleen Florence Smith, Higher Executive Officer, Department of Employment.
- Philip Soldinger. For services to the community in Sunderland.
- Jean Margaret Start, Senior Secretary, Department of Physical Education and Sports Science, Loughborough University of Technology.
- Frederick Hugh Stazicker, Chief Inspector, Metropolitan Police.
- Peter Cecil Steel, General Medical Practitioner, Groombridge, Kent.
- John Buchan Stephen, Pharmacist, Caldercruix.
- Donald James Stewart. For Political Service.
- John Laurence Streeting, Senior Executive Officer, Department of Health and Social Security.
- Rowland Francis Syer. For Political Service in Wales.
- Richard Martin Tanner, Senior Project Engineer, Flight Refuelling Ltd.
- Ronald Alfred Taylor, Inspector of Taxes, Board of Inland Revenue.
- John Brinley George Thomas, Journalist, Western Mail.
- Marion Thomas, Senior Executive Officer, Department of Trade and Industry.
- John Edward Thornhill, Secretary/Treasurer, Rochdale Centre, St. John Ambulance Association.
- Stanley Cecil Timms, lately Senior Probation Officer, West Midlands Probation Service.
- Norman Albert Tope, Director, Montgomery Plating Co. Ltd.
- Alan Bland Totty, Principal, Animal Breeding Research Organisation, Agricultural Research Council.
- James Edward Tuplin, Chief Constable, Port of London Authority.
- George Adams Turrell, lately Higher Scientific Officer, Ministry of Agriculture, Fisheries and Food.
- Herbert Henry Tydd, MM, Executive Director, Roy Bowles Transport plc.
- Jean Vaughan, Higher Executive Officer, Department of Employment.
- Charles Thomas Fredrick Wainwright, Manager, Quality Engineering and Systems, Stevenage Division, Dynamics Group, British Aerospace plc. For services to Export.
- Dennis Walker, Area Manager, St. Pancras, British Rail.
- James Walker, Senior Health and Safety Officer, George Wimpey plc.
- Mollie Elizabeth Ward. For Political Service.
- Rodney William Baines Ward. For services to horticulture in the Isles of Scilly.
- Eric Arthur Warman, Higher Executive Officer, Board of Inland Revenue.
- Richmond Watkins, Chief Clerk, Admission Order Office, House of Commons.
- Lieutenant Commander James Victor Watson, Royal Navy, Secretary/Treasurer, The Association of Royal Navy Officers.
- Kathleen Martin Watson, Secretary, Scottish Countryside Activities Council.
- Robert Watt, Traction and Train Crew Officer, Scottish Region, British Rail.
- John Webster, Farmer, Tarlscough, Lancashire.
- Robin Watson Welsh. For services to Curling.
- Fergus Anthony Wheeler. For services to local government; Member, Moyle District Council.
- Joyce Eileen Wheeler, Higher Executive Officer, Northern Ireland Office.
- William Whistlecroft, Head of School of Physical Education, Yeovil College.
- George Ernest Whitfield, County Organiser, Lancashire Federation of Young Farmers' Clubs.
- Ethel Margaret Wilby, Clerical Officer, Ministry of Defence.
- Herbert Wilkinson. For services to the Boys' Brigade in Burnley and the North West.
- Joan Helen Willans, lately Matron, St. Christopher's Hospice, Sydenham, London.
- Frederick Arthur Willett. For services to mentally disabled people in Ashford.
- Robert John Williams, lately County Secretary, Anglesey, Farmers' Union of Wales.
- Anni Winnicki, Senior Sister, Felix Post Unit, Maudsley Hospital, Special Health Authority.
- John Anthony Winter, Architect, John Winter & Associates.
- Major John William Ernest Wood, TD, (Retd.), lately Retired Officer III, Ministry of Defence.
- Thomas Wood, Test Examiner, Blackburn Area Road Safety Association.
- Elizabeth Woodburn, Secretary, Save the Children Fund, Ballymena, Co. Antrim.
- Mona Woodford, National Organiser, "The Open Door Association" for Agoraphobics.
- John Woods, Higher Executive Officer, Ministry of Defence.
- Elizabeth Mary Worth, Senior Clerk, British Waterways Repair Yard, Goole.
- Geoffrey Arnold Wytchard, Commercial Manager, R. A. Lister & Co. Ltd.
- David Macdonald Yuill, Energy Consultant.

Diplomatic Service and Overseas List

- Archibald Macindoe Adam. For services to British commercial interests in Portugal.
- John Douglas Akers. For services to British shipping interests in Panama.
- Patricia Ann Appels. For services to British cultural interests in Belgium.
- Donald Martin Armstrong, British Vice-Consul, Portimao, Portugal.
- Rosalie Bryant Arnald, lately Executive Assistant, HM Embassy, Washington.
- Jean Florence Laura Barrow, lately Personnel Department, IAEA, Vienna.
- Robert Martin Bennett, lately Director of Forestry, Vanuatu.
- Henry Hector Bisset, QPM, lately Police Training Officer, Tonga.
- Elsie Block. For services to the British community in New York.
- Brian Alfred Bowen, lately Antiquities Adviser, Government of Jordan.
- Margaret Elsie Burnham. For services to the British community in Luxembourg.
- Ada Mary, Countess Chevreau D'Antraigues. For services to the British community in Lausanne.
- Jean Anne Chiswell, lately Personal Assistant to HM Ambassador, Prague.
- Chau How-chen. For public services in Hong Kong.
- Choy Pun Siu-fun. For welfare services to the community in Hong Kong.
- Victor Francis Xavier Coote, Pro-Consul, HM Embassy, Rangoon.
- Robert Walker Cormack. For services to British commercial interests in Malawi.
- Arthur Ian Diamond, Archivist, Public Records Office, Hong Kong.
- Elisabeth Anne Drummond-Hay, lately Personal Secretary, HM Embassy, Copenhagen.
- Peter Edward Drury. For services to education in Penang, Malaysia.
- Brenda Duckworth. For services to the British community in Peru.
- Theodore Valin Early, Divisional Fire Officer, Bermuda.
- Mary Stacker Engman. For services to the British community in Philadelphia.
- Elisabeth Espitalie. For services to the British community in Cahors, France.
- Arlette Elizabeth Georgette Falanga, Accommodation Officer, HM Embassy, Paris.
- Sister Lilias Falconer. For welfare services to orphans in Zambia.
- Doreen Evelyn Fishwick, Personal Assistant to HM Ambassador, Jedda.
- Ruth Fraser. For services to the community in Hong Kong.
- Sister Elizabeth Gallagher. For services to English-speaking visitors to Lourdes.
- Dr. Lilian Blanche Mary Harris. For medical services to the community in Nairobi.
- Hui In-ying. For services to the community in Hong Kong.
- Major Frederick William Jeffery (Retired). For services to the community in Kenya.
- Maureen Patricia Jonker-Carroll. For educational services to the British community in the Netherlands.
- Stephen Lau Ka-men, Manager, Government Data Processing Agency, Hong Kong.
- Patricia Edith Levsaker, Commercial Officer, HM Embassy, Oslo.
- Captain James Linton, BEM. For services to British shipping interests in Dubai.
- Kevin McNamara, Commercial Officer, British Consulate-General, San Francisco.
- Roy Charles Makin, Second Secretary (Commercial), British High Commission, Ottawa.
- Ernest Richard Maycock, Senior Assistant Registrar, Registrar General's Department, Hong Kong.
- John Malcolm Morris. For services to Plantation development in Indonesia.
- Soldanella Oyler. For services to British cultural interests in Örebro, Sweden.
- Florence Parfery (Sister Edana). For educational and welfare services to children in Liberia.
- Joseph Norris Payne, CPM, Chief of Police, Anguilla.
- Grace Marjorie Piercy, Secretary, Public Service Commission, Cayman Islands.
- Kenneth James Pimblett. For services to British commercial interests in Poland.
- Dr. Robin Beverley Priscott. For medical services to the British community in Jedda.
- Evermond Roland Rabsatt. For services to the community in the British Virgin Islands.
- Sheilah Rome. For services to the British community in India.
- The Honourable Edwina Sandys. For services to British cultural interests in New York.
- Rosemary Scott. For services to the British community in Nigeria.
- Vera Constance Shrosbree, lately Vice Consul, HM Embassy, Caracas.
- Anthony Peter Simon. For services to the British community in Colombia.
- Helen Smithies. Archivist, British Consulate-General, Johannesburg.
- John Martin Tanner. For educational services to the British community in Yokohama.
- Araminta Antoinette Tatem, Supernumerary Senior Accounting Officer, Turks and Caicos Islands.
- Paul Tsano Whan, Recruiting Officer, Civil Aid Services, Hong Kong.
- Elio Victor, Principal Youth and Careers Officer, Department of Education, Gibraltar.
- Bobbie Voice, lately Administration Officer, British Council, Madrid.
- Frederick Mathewson Walker. For services to British commercial interests in Tokyo.
- Katherine Edith Wildman, Personal Secretary, HM Embassy, Madrid.
- James Wilson. For services to development in Mozambique.
- Anne Wright. For services to wildlife conservation in India.

Australian States

State of Queensland

- John Alan Beasy. For service to the community.
- George Samuel Clifford Butt. For service to the community.
- The Reverend Wallace Ernest Gregory. For services to the community.
- John Daventry Mann Thompson. For service to the sport of polocrosse.
- Faread Tooma. For service to the Lebanese community.
- Ernest Walter Wagner. For service to dentistry.
- Herbert Ian Walker. For service to the community.

State of Tasmania

- Cecil McRae Archer. For services to the community.
- Mervyn Maxwell House, JP. For services to the community.

=== Order of the Companions of Honour (CH) ===
- The Honourable Sir Steven Runciman (The Honourable Sir James Cochran Stevenson Runciman). For services to Byzantine Art and History.
- Sir Sacheverell Sitwell, Bt., Author.

=== Companion of the Imperial Service Order (ISO) ===
Home Civil Service

- Alan Armstrong, Principal, Department of Trade and Industry.
- John Hurst Baines, lately Principal Professional and Technology Officer, Ministry of Defence.
- Peter Antony Blomfield, Principal, Board of Customs and Excise.
- Richard Bolton, lately Deputy Controller, Department of Health and Social Security.
- Rosemary Margaret Bunn, Principal Scientific Officer, British Library.
- Frederick Leonard Canter, Principal Training Services Officer, Department of Employment.
- Robert Gair, Regional Entomologist, Grade I, Ministry of Agriculture, Fisheries and Food.
- Alan Antrobus Gibbons, First Class Valuer, Board of Inland Revenue.
- Archibald John Hannan, Assistant Director (Engineering), Ministry of Defence.
- Hannelore Helps, Principal, Department of Trade and Industry.
- Stephen Alfred Jones, lately Principal Marine Services Officer (Engineer), Ministry of Defence.
- James Murray McNicol, lately Principal, Ministry of Defence.
- William George Mason, lately Principal, Lord Chancellor's Department.
- David Sinclair Mercer, Foreign and Commonwealth Office.
- Robert Moffat, Divisional Veterinary Officer, Ministry of Agriculture, Fisheries and Food.
- John Anthony Nugent, Principal Officer, Department of Health and Social Services, Northern Ireland.
- Bernardine O'Callaghan, Principal, Industry Department for Scotland.
- Roderick Pilcher, Principal Professional Technology Officer, Department of the Environment.
- Edward James Pratt, Principal, HM Procurator General and Treasury Solicitor's Department.
- Gerald Patrick Ranaldi, Principal, Cabinet Office.
- Peter George Rolfe, Inspector, Board of Inland Revenue.
- Barbara Ethel Sabey, Senior Principal Scientific Officer, Department of Transport.
- Donald Leonard Smith, Senior Principal, Home Office.
- James William Taylor, Foreign and Commonwealth Office.
- Jeffrey Phillips Wright, Principal, Department of Health and Social Security.

Diplomatic Service and Overseas List

- Chan Pak, Assistant Director of Housing, Hong Kong.
- John Hogarth Grieve, CPM, lately Chief Superintendent, Royal Hong Kong Police Force.
- Michael Clafton Illingworth, QPM, CPM, Assistant Commissioner, Royal Hong Kong Police Force.
- Dennis Robert Rick, lately Government Printer, Hong Kong.

Australian States

State of Queensland

- Clyde Gilmour, Director-General of Education.

State of Tasmania

- Douglas Thomas Doyle, lately Director-General of Lands.

=== British Empire Medal (BEM) ===
Military Division

Royal Navy

- D072045A Acting Fleet Chief Weapon Engineering Artificer Gerrard John Power
- D088073H Chief Petty Officer (Operations) (Sonar) (SM) Terence Leonard Eynon
- D062587Y Chief Petty Officer Cook Geoffrey Graham Hounslea
- D057421F Chief Petty Officer Marine Engineering Artificer (P) Terence Colin Mash
- J944210N Chief Petty Officer (Seaman) George James Bunkin
- D079300R Chief Petty Officer Weapon Engineering Artificer Terence John Cokeley
- J976839G Chief Petty Officer (Seaman) David Price
- D060268L Chief Petty Officer Steward Michael John Riches
- J965712Y Chief Petty Officer (Operations) (Sonar) Roy Reginald Rodaway
- D091019K Chief Petty Officer (Operations) (Missile) Gregory Herbert Keith Till
- J949192P Chief Radio Supervisor Peter Anthony McKenna
- D069032A Chief Air Engineering Mechanic (Electrical) Peter James Anderson
- D067780U Chief Marine Engineering Mechanic (M) Michael John Breslin
- F976286S Acting Chief Petty Officer Airman (AH) Thomas Mackie Mackay
- D178531Y Petty Officer Airman (AH) James Mavln
- D056664R Master-at-Arms James Dickson Turnbull
- W125142F Chief Wren Writer (G) Patricia Prior, Women's Royal Naval Service
- W952221A Petty Officer Wren Radio Supervisor Lesley Iris Collings, Women's Royal Naval Reserve
- X/D986154P Chief Petty Officer Weapon Engineering Artificer Roy Edgar Milton, Royal Naval Reserve
- R807537 Yeoman of Signals Patrick O'Brien, Royal Fleet Auxiliary
- P015852A Colour Sergeant John Repton Deane, Royal Marines
- P021101K Colour Sergeant James Francis Stallerbrass, Royal Marines
- P019442M Sergeant Roy Pennington, Royal Marines
- P990889E Colour Sergeant David Ronald Robinson, Royal Marines Reserve

Army

- 24241956 Staff Sergeant (now Warrant Officer Class 2) Alan Richard Jones, The Queen's Regiment, Territorial Army
- 23517604 Staff Sergeant (Acting Warrant Officer Class 2) Dennis Allan Irving, The Argyll and Sutherland Highlanders (Princess Louise's)
- 23939644 Staff Sergeant (Acting Warrant Officer Class 2) Jeffrey Robert Fairbairn, The Parachute Regiment
- 23865132 Staff Sergeant (Acting Warrant Officer Class 2) Morris Robinson, Grenadier Guards
- 24281605 Staff Sergeant (Acting Warrant Officer Class 2) David John Hill, Intelligence Corps
- W/438358 Staff Sergeant (Acting Warrant Officer Class 2) Francis Amy May Tull, Women's Royal Army Corps
- HK/18262641 Staff Sergeant (Acting Warrant Officer Class 2) Lin Hung Yee, Hong Kong Military Service Corps (now discharged)
- 22644244 Staff Sergeant David Ernest Jones, The Queen's Lancashire Regiment, Territorial Army
- 24092802 Staff Sergeant Garry James Long, Royal Army Ordnance Corps
- 24075197 Staff Sergeant Alan Philip Major, Corps of Royal Military Police
- 24062058 Staff Sergeant Keith Holt, Royal Army Ordnance Corps
- 23868242 Staff Sergeant Anthony Heywood Cox, The Devonshire and Dorset Regiment
- 24017150 Staff Sergeant Geoffrey Cromack, Royal Corps of Signals
- 24175395 Staff Sergeant Ronald Gordon Cufley, Intelligence Corps, Territorial Army
- 24193261 Staff Sergeant Roderick Daddow, Royal Army Ordnance Corps
- 24118966 Staff Sergeant Alan Ryan, 4th/7th Royal Dragoon Guards
- 24118205 Staff Sergeant John Richard Sewell, 9th/12th Royal Lancers (Prince of Wales's)
- 23547242 Staff Sergeant Alexander Calder Shaw, The King's Own Scottish Borderers
- 24120940 Staff Sergeant Leonard Charles Dean, Corps of Royal Engineers
- 24141744 Staff Sergeant Dennis Harold Codd, Military Provost Staff Corps
- 24136302 Staff Sergeant Nigel Bruce, Anstey, Corps of Royal Electrical and Mechanical Engineers
- 23537496 Staff Sergeant William Henry Carey, Royal Corps of Signals, Territorial Army (now discharged)
- 24126314 Staff Sergeant Richard Melville Horlor, Corps of Royal Electrical and Mechanical Engineers
- 24166595 Staff Sergeant David Gillon, Royal Corps of Transport, Territorial Army
- 24010610 Staff Sergeant Maxwell Williams, Royal Corps of Signals
- 24033418 Staff Sergeant Kenneth John Yeoman, The Parachute Regiment
- W/402309 Staff Sergeant Caroline Cameron, Women's Royal Army Corps, Territorial Army
- LS/23728152 Staff Sergeant John Griffiths, Royal Regiment of Artillery
- LS/22522139 Staff Sergeant Clifford Pollard, The Royal Green Jackets
- LS/23532979 Staff Sergeant Barry Stephen Sutcliffe, The Royal Anglian Regiment
- LS/23462222 Staff Sergeant Thomas Samuel Watton, The Duke of Edinburgh's Royal Regiment (Berkshire and Wiltshire)
- 22974313 Sergeant (Acting Staff Sergeant) Jack Fowler, The Parachute Regiment
- 24031829 Sergeant (Acting Staff Sergeant) Michael Geoffrey Slocombe, Corps of Royal Military Police
- 23928046 Sergeant (Acting Staff Sergeant) Ronald Hutchinson, The King's Regiment
- 24124888 Sergeant Frederick Thomas, Costen, The Royal Anglian Regiment, Territorial Army
- 24028103 Sergeant George Dickinson Cowie, Corps of Royal Engineers
- 24354003 Sergeant Stephen Niall Jackson, Royal Corps of Signals
- 24039702 Sergeant Anthony John Taylor, Corps of Royal Electrical and Mechanical Engineers
- 21184230 Sergeant Ronald George Franklin, Officers Training Corps, Territorial Army
- 24141696 Sergeant Raymond Thomas George Warlow, Grenadier Guards
- 24147277 Sergeant Robert Michael Wilson, Corps of Royal Engineers
- 23463398 Sergeant Martin James Wright, Wessex Regiment, Territorial Army
- 24068409 Sergeant Martin Richard Evan Priddice, Corps of Royal Electrical and Mechanical Engineers
- 24235767 Sergeant Roy Bingham, Royal Army Ordnance Corps
- 23929026 Corporal of Horse Gerald Clark, The Life Guards
- 24272243 Corporal (Acting Sergeant) Arthur Thomas Allison, Corps of Royal Military Police
- 24364403 Corporal (Acting Sergeant) Peter George Rolf, Royal Army Ordnance Corps
- 24270094 Corporal (Acting Sergeant) Peter Philip Vowles, Corps of Royal Engineers
- 24274611 Corporal (Acting Sergeant) Graham Michael Tilley, Royal Corps of Signals
- 23732275 Corporal Richard Blyth, The Royal Anglian Regiment (now discharged)
- 24349012 Corporal Paul Alexander Gover, Corps of Royal Engineers
- 24386247 Corporal Jeffrey Alan Grindle, Army Air Corps
- 24246895 Corporal Kevin Brian Hicks, Corps of Royal Military Police
- 22210454 Corporal John Dominic Horgan, Corps of Royal Engineers, Territorial Army
- 24346549 Corporal Arthur McLelland, Royal Corps of Transport
- 23984429 Corporal Donald Tough, The Royal Regiment of Fusiliers
- 24228788 Corporal John Ernest Nevatte, Royal Army Ordnance Corps
- 23706703 Corporal Patrick John O'Brien, The Prince of Wales's Own Regiment of Yorkshire
- 24362939 Corporal Michael George Coles, Corps of Royal Engineers
- 23537652 Corporal John Sinclair Donachie, Royal Corps of Signals
- 24099190 Corporal Charles Edward Stedman, The Royal Green Jackets
- 23494477 Bombardier Anthony John Wicks, Royal Regiment of Artillery (now discharged)
- 24252972 Lance Corporal Jonathan Michael Cope, The Queen's Royal Irish Hussars
- 24054993 Lance Corporal Raymond Marchbank, The King's Regiment
- 24270309 Lance Corporal Stephen Gordon Wilkinson, Corps of Royal Engineers

Royal Air Force

- S4177572 Flight Sergeant Brian Hubert Baker
- J8000736 Flight Sergeant Colin Edward Birnie
- B3527995 Flight Sergeant Peter David Donnelly
- V1929005 Flight Sergeant James Cunningham Fairgrieve
- Q4092945 Flight Sergeant (now Warrant Officer) George Albert Firman
- R3519619 Flight Sergeant William Brian John
- G1940459 Flight Sergeant Christopher John Lawless
- J4265708 Flight Sergeant John Patrick Anthony McCarthy
- X2429495 Flight Sergeant Barrie Granville Soar
- V0690499 Chief Technician John Harold Chandler
- F1941526 Chief Technician Francis Stewart Heggie
- Q0680839 Chief Technician Hugh Johnstone McNeill
- C0684045 Chief Technician Peter John Rich
- X0582716 Chief Technician Kenneth William Savage
- B1924349 Chief Technician Denis John Thomas, RVM
- F4271831 Sergeant Lawrence Brown
- X4262818 Sergeant Gareth Douglas Furmage
- K8150054 Sergeant Robert Gauci
- S1943545 Sergeant David Maurice
- Q0595284 Sergeant Francis Wareham
- 08049948 Sergeant Margaret Docherty, Women's Royal Air Force

Bar to the British Empire Medal

- A2996562 Acting Flight Sergeant Catherine Mary Townsend, BEM, Women's Royal Air Force

Civil Division

United Kingdom

- Dorothy Agnes Adams. For services to the community in Birmingham.
- Kenneth Charles Aldred, Station Supervisor, Lowestoft, Eastern Region, British Rail.
- Daphne Alice Allen, Office Keeper Grade 1A, Home Office.
- George Richard Allen, Chargehand Mason, Ancient Monuments and Historic Buildings Directorate Department of the Environment.
- John Allen. For services to the National Association of Boys Clubs in Northumberland.
- William Thomas Lindsay Allen, Research and Experimental Mechanic, Engineering Division, Winfrith, United Kingdom Atomic Energy Authority.
- Joseph William Allerton, Chief Petty Officer, BP.
- Robert Noble Alston, Constable, Lothian and Borders Police.
- Janet Smith Anderson, General Administrative Clerk, Haven Products Ltd., Largs.
- Domingo Txomin Arana, Assembler Moulder, Cambridge Instruments pic.
- John Ascroft, Storeman, Gridweld Division, Allied Steel & Wire Ltd.
- Dorothy Backholer. Club Manager, Stanley Barracks, Bovington, Navy, Army and Air Force Institutes.
- Arthur Bailey, Foreign and Commonwealth Office.
- Harold Francis Bailey, Building Foreman, Basingstoke District Hospital, Basingstoke and North Hampshire Health Authority.
- Ronald Baines. For services to the Boys' Brigade in Halifax.
- John Anthony Baker, Warrant Officer, No. 211 (Newbury) Squadron, Air Training Corps.
- Lilian Kate Bamford, Postal Clerk, Milton Keynes Development Corporation.
- David Frederick Banks, Fireman, London Fire Brigade.
- Peter Barker, Chief Officer I, Medical Directorate, HM Prison Service.
- William James Beament, First Shopman, Godden Butchers Ltd., Berkhamsted.
- Robert Bennett, Trades Officer Class IE, Northern Ireland Prison Service.
- Dorothy Bishop, Metropolitan Organiser, Wolverhampton, Women's Royal Voluntary Service.
- Hugh Allen Black, Deputy Superintendent (Security & Warders), Ulster Museum.
- Percy Ernest Alan Black, Progress and General Supervisory Grade C, Ministry of Defence.
- William Henry Gornal Black, lately Joiner, Lambeg Industrial Research Association.
- Bertie Frank Sidney Blowers, Sub-Divisional Officer, Suffolk Special Constabulary.
- Charles Blyth, lately Chauffeur, Northern Engineering Industries pic.
- Henry Bryan Bolitho, Groundsman 1, RNAS Culdrose, Ministry of Defence.
- Joseph Thomas Bolton. For services to the British Limbless Ex-servicemen's Association in Chester and District.
- Joseph William Bowden, Foreman, Alnwick Division, Northumberland County Council.
- Griffith Milton Bowen, Non-Tech. B, Chemical Technology Division, United Kingdom Atomic Energy Authority.
- William John Bowkett, Vehicle Mechanic, Ministry of Defence.
- Elizabeth Ann Bowling, Sub-Postmistress, Nugent Road Sub-Post Office, London N.W.8, The Post Office.
- Lilian Rose Brackley, Centre Organiser, Wimborne Branch, British Red Cross Society.
- Sydney Briggs, Ward Orderly, Daisy Hill Hospital, Newry.
- Eric William Brown, Stores Officer Grade D, Ministry of Defence.
- Jesse Brown, Sergeant, West Midlands Police.
- Joseph Weatherill Brown. For services to youth in North Yorkshire.
- Robert Charles Brown, Messenger, Department of the Environment, Northern Ireland.
- William Alexander Coutts Buchan, Driver, Grampian Television.
- Agnes Bushell, Sub Postmistress, Hambleton S.P.S.O. Oakham, Midlands Postal Board, The Post Office.
- Horace John Butters, Sergeant, Metropolitan Police.
- Constance Mary Carr. For services to the community, particularly the Leeds General Infirmary.
- Thomas Arthur Chadwick. For services to the community in Ashbourne, Derbyshire.
- Irene Doris Challis, Cleaner, Department of Employment.
- John William Chapman, Constable, Norfolk Constabulary.
- Leonard John Charlton, Engineering Foreman, Scale 2, East Midlands Electricity Board.
- Robert Charlton. For services to the community, particularly to youth, in Jarrow.
- Harry Chesters. For services to the community, particularly Stepping Hill Hospital, Stockport.
- Louisa Lilian Coles, Village Representative Borough Green, Kent, Women's Royal Voluntary Service.
- Norman Collins, Cleansing Supervisor, Chiltern District Council.
- Michael Comstive, Works Superintendent, Burnley Engineering Products Ltd.
- Harold John Cooke, Laboratory Technician, Gresham's School, Holt.
- Dennis Eric Cooper, Fabric Worker Grade A, Ministry of Defence.
- John Patrick Cooper, Chauffeur, Josiah Wedgwood & Sons Ltd.
- Edward Albert Cossey, lately Manager, HMS Pembroke, Navy, Army and Air Force Institutes Shop.
- Gordon Alfred John Crisp, Quality Manager, Hebron & Medlock Engineering Ltd.
- Thomas Stanley Cross. For services to the community in Brecon.
- John Thomas Davenport, Foreman Warehouseman, LUWKA Storage Ltd. Cheshire.
- Brynmor Davies, Senior Overman, Trelewis Drift Mine, South Wales Area, National Coal Board.
- Mary Suvla Davies, County Organiser, South Glamorgan, St. John Ambulance Association.
- Brian Dawson, Retained Sub Officer, Durham Fire Brigade.
- Albert Dodd, Works Convenor of Shop Stewards, Brush Electrical Machines Ltd., Amalgamated Union of Engineering Workers.
- Leslie Thomas Draper, Constable, Bedfordshire Police.
- Neville Clive Dunn, Postman, Stoke-on-Trent HPO, Midlands Postal Board, The Post Office.
- Austin Gwynne Edwards. For services to the communities of Llangenny and Glangrwyney.
- Maurice Edwards, Chairman, Glasgow and West of Scotland Cadet Officers' Committee, St. Andrew's Ambulance Association.
- Gordon Graham Elliott, Constable, Essex Police.
- Barbara Vera Ellis, Civilian Clerk C4a, Ministry of Defence.
- Sheilah Darby Ellis, Shepherdess, Priory Farm, Brook, Leicestershire.
- Frank Robert Everson, Packaging Operative, Remploy Ltd. St Helens.
- Jack Royston Fennell, lately Constable, Metropolitan Police.
- Lilian Emily Fish, School Crossing Patrol, Metropolitan Police.
- Andreas Fisher, Clerk Grade 1, Ministry of Defence.
- Reginald Peter Fisher, Organist, Church of St. Barbara, HM S. Excellent, Portsmouth.
- June Jessie Fleming, Foster Parent, Strathclyde Regional Council.
- Peter Fletcher, Parks Area Superintendent, Norwich City Council.
- Norman Alfred Fowles, Beaterman, PIM Board Co. Ltd.
- Peter Frost, Technical Officer, London, South Central, British Telecom.
- Reginald Arthur David Fullelove, Craftsman (Electrical Inspection), Cannock/Lichfield Depot, Midlands Electricity Board.
- John Edward Gammage, Foreman, Plating and Finishing Department, Martin-Baker Aircraft Co. Ltd.
- Donald Albert Geary, lately Manager, Seaton Youth Centre, Jersey.
- Laurence Georgeson. For services to youth and pipe music in Stirling and district.
- Alec Sidney Gilbert, Principal Officer, HM Prison, Pentonville.
- Kenneth Gillon, Parking Driver, West Yorkshire Passenger Transport Executive.
- Samuel James Gourley, Repository Assistant I, Public Record Office of Northern Ireland.
- Gilbert Lloyd Graham, Youth Leader, Penrith Methodist Youth Club.
- Charles Herman Green, Member, Ceremonial Staff, London, Order of St. John.
- George Arthur Green, Works Supervisor, L. P. Foreman & Sons Ltd.
- Douglas Ronald Greenslade, Registered Dock Worker, Poole Harbour Commission.
- Ronald Gregg, Hot Blade Forgings Inspector, Doncasters Monk Bridge Ltd.
- Ethel Leah Gregory. For services to the community in Chesterfield, Derbyshire.
- Maurice Leslie Guy, Maintenance Supervisor, Bakery Department, The Ryvita Co. Ltd.
- James Hall, Face Worker, Parsonage Colliery, Western Area, National Coal Board.
- William Geoffrey Harrington, Constable, Cumbria Constabulary.
- George Henry Harris, Driver/Operator, Liverpool City Transport.
- John Curran Harrow, Principal Lightkeeper, Cromarty Lighthouse, Northern Lighthouse Board.
- Mary Hearne, Senior Messenger, Department of Education and Science.
- Anthony Fay Hildrop, Process Worker, Calder Works, British Nuclear Fuels Ltd.
- Edith Ellen Hodges, Caretaker, Highfield House, Western Wessex, Territorial Army Volunteer Reserve Association.
- John Holgate, Civilian Instructor, Barrow-in-Furness Unit, Sea Cadet Corps.
- William Hume, Technical Assistant, Graves Art Gallery, Sheffield.
- Thomas Ireland, Foreman, Commercial Hydraulics Ltd.
- Helen Monica Jalland. For services to St. Ann's Hospice, Cheshire.
- Kathleen Florence Johnson, lately Supervisor, Members' Tea Room, House of Commons.
- Sheila Fay Joicey, Superintendent of Cleaners, Department of Health and Social Security.
- Arthur James Jones, Registered Dock Worker, Tilbury Dock, Port of London Authority.
- Edward Benjamin Jones, Water Supply Superintendent, Welsh Water Authority.
- John Ellis Jones, Foreman, Transport, J. Bibby & Sons pic.
- Ben Kell, Highway Superintendent, West Yorkshire County Council.
- William James Kelsey, Warrant Officer, No. 1087 (Arun Valley) Squadron, Air Training Corps.
- Robina Neill Kennedy, Administrative Assistant and Social Transport Organiser, Edinburgh District, Women's Royal Voluntary Service.
- Olive Mary Kershaw, Area Supervisor, Catering Services Department, City of Coventry.
- Christopher Robert Kidd, Fitter Mechanic, Department of the Environment.
- Harold King, Superintendent, Product & Development Test Section, Military Transmission Division, David Brown Gear Industries Ltd.
- Mabel Lily Elaine Knight, Home Help, Hertfordshire County Council.
- Jack Hector Lark, Foreign and Commonwealth Office.
- Leslie Gordon Lawrence, Stores Supervisory Officer C, Office of the Receiver of the Metropolitan Police District.
- Gerard Vincent Logan, Postal Executive 'C', Head Post Office, Sheffield, The Post Office.
- John Arthur Loughlin, lately Switchboard Attendant, North Western Electricity Board.
- Sheelah Betty Marsland Lucas, Chairman, Croxley House Residential Club, Women's Royal Voluntary Service.
- Alexander McGeachy McCorkindale, Boatswain, Ben Line.
- Mary MacDonald, Telephone Supervisor, University of Sheffield.
- William Keith McDonald, Senior Storekeeper, Ministry of Defence.
- Joseph Alexander McGorman, lately Senior Foreman, Ulster Sheltered Employment Ltd.
- Thomas Inglis McIntyre. For services to amateur dramatics in South-East Scotland.
- James McKechnie, Foreman, Y. & C. Valvework Ltd., Glasgow.
- Mary Ann Mackinnon, Chief Officer I, HM Prison, Corntonvale.
- William McLellan McLachlan, Professional and Technology Officer IV, Ministry of Defence.
- John McLean, Driver, Scotland, British Broadcasting Corporation.
- Ian Cameron Macmillan, Fireman, Lochranza Unit, Strathclyde Fire Brigade.
- Samuel McMullan, Senior Supervisor, Department of Agriculture, Northern Ireland.
- Donald John MacPherson, Auxiliary Coastguard in Charge, Lochmaddy, North Uist.
- Duncan Ross McPherson, Service Engineer, Scottish Region, British Gas Corporation.
- John Madden. For services to the Ramblers' Association in West Yorkshire.
- Roy Madin, Assistant Training Officer, Bolsover Colliery, North Derbyshire Area, National Coal Board.
- James Wood Mair, Chief Guards Inspector, Scottish Region, British Rail.
- Samuel Frederick Martin. Sergeant, Royal Ulster Constabulary.
- Eileen Winifred Mason. For services to renal dialysis patients in Dorset.
- Harry Mason, Cemetery Supervisor, Wetherby Cemetery, Wetherby, West Yorkshire.
- Trevor Hilton Mears, Sub Officer, South Glamorgan Fire Service.
- Robert Arthur Mee, Chargehand Fitter, Turbo-Generator Division, Brush Electrical Machines Ltd.
- Thomas Melling, Senior Technician (Woodworking), North Western Museum and Art Gallery Service.
- Reginald John Merchant, Chief Paperkeeper, Department of Trade and Industry.
- Ernest Richard Merry, Professional and Technology Officer III, Strangeways Research Laboratory, Cambridge, Medical Research Council.
- Ronald Carlos Mills, Motor Transport Superintendent, Ministry of Defence.
- Francis Millsopp, Hydrant Patrolman, Fire Authority for Northern Ireland.
- Ethel Gillian Moggridge, Manageress of Cutting and Sewing, Watts & Company.
- Arthur Brian Moneypenny, Constable, Merseyside Police.
- Arthur Bertram Morgan, Groundsman, Parker's Piece, Cambridge.
- Charles Albert Moth, Forest Worker, Fountain Forestry Ltd.
- Graham Munkley, Colliery Overman, Penallta Colliery, South Wales Area, National Coal Board.
- Ian Hector Murchison, District Linesman, North of Scotland Hydro-Electric Board.
- Edwin John Murfin, lately Professional and Technology Officer IV, Ministry of Defence.
- Ellen Hayes Murray, Directors' Senior Waitress, Yarrow Shipbuilders Ltd.
- William Neish, Stockman, Burnton, Laurencekirk, Kincardineshire.
- William Harry Robin Netting, Constable, Metropolitan Police.
- Jessie Julia Newman. For services to the community in Purton, Wiltshire.
- William James O'Neill, Senior Lorry Driver, J. S. Fisher Ltd., Newry.
- Doris May Pargeter. For services to mentally disabled people in Margate, Kent.
- Michael William Partridge, Foreman, Machine Shop, Bristol Division, Dynamics Group, British Aerospace plc.
- James Taylor Paterson. For charitable services in the Port Talbot area.
- Sheila Peachey, Telephonist, Investigation Branch, Board of Customs and Excise.
- Reginald George Peeling, Gardener, Peckover House, Wisbech, The National Trust.
- Elsa Perry. For services to the community in the Taunton area.
- George Morton Pinkney, Progress Inspection Engineer, Davy McKee (Stockton) Ltd.
- Ernest Plummer, Constable, Yorkshire Metropolitan Police. (Died 30 November 1983.)
- Frederick Joseph Pitt, Chargehand Electrician, Ordnance Survey.
- Charles Henry Porter. For services to the Boys' Brigade in London.
- Donald John Powell, Maintenance Controller, Edward Curran Ltd., Cardiff.
- James Edwin Powley, Mailing Supervisor. Headquarters, British Gas Corporation.
- Sidney Pushman, Assistant Chief Photoprinter, Department of Trade and Industry.
- Robert Raine, lately Blacksmith, Head Wrightson Stampings Ltd.
- Frederick Corlett Richards. For services to the community in Liverpool.
- George Alexander Riddell, Professional and Technology Officer III, Department of the Environment.
- Ann Watson Ritchie, Charge Hand, Staff Shop, J. & P. Coats Ltd.
- Frank Henry Roberts, Chief Petty Officer Instructor, Lambeth Unit, Sea Cadet Corps.
- Charles Edward Robinson, Professional and Technology Officer IV, Department of Transport.
- Harry Roddis, Foreman Meter Reading, Sheffield Area, Yorkshire Electricity Board.
- Austin Rooney, Turner, Northumberland Engine Works, dark Hawthorn Ltd.
- Frederick Rottier, Sergeant, Greater Manchester Police.
- Anna Margaret Scorer, Auxiliary Observer, Auxiliary Station, Reepham, Lincoln, Meteorological Office.
- Doreen May Scott, Senior Chief Supervisor (Day), Operator Services Division, British Telecom International.
- Warren Ivor Sewell, Process and General Supervisory Grade ' D', Ministry of Defence.
- William George Thomas Shewell, Chargehand Craftsman, Aircraft Engine Fitter, Ministry of Defence.
- Ernest Short, lately Electrical Fitter Grade I, Ministry of Defence.
- Horace Edward Smith, lately Regimental Sergeant Major Instructor, Warwickshire and West Midland South Sector, Army Cadet Force.
- Jack Smith, Resources Superintendent, Humberside County Council.
- John Richard Smith, Security Guard, Access Control, Airport Security, Heathrow Airport.
- Sylvia Helen Caldwell-Smith, District Organiser, Mid-Suffolk, Women's Royal Voluntary Service.
- Peter John William Smithson, Driver, Government Car Service, Department of the Environment.
- Frances Mabel Solle, Organiser, London Borough of Hammersmith Emergency Services, Women's Royal Voluntary Service.
- Alexander McLimont Spiers, Sergeant, Royal Ulster Constabulary.
- Michael Stone, Setter 'A', Ministry of Defence.
- Donald Martyn Stoneham, Senior Service Liaison Engineer, Dynamics Group, Hatfield Division, British Aerospace plc.
- Moyra Charlotte, Lady Streatfeild, Meals on Wheels Organiser, Aylesbury, Women's Royal Voluntary Service.
- Diana Marilene Yola Stubbles, Supervisor of Telephonists, Board of Inland Revenue.
- Peter Petrie Sutherland, lately Chief Steward, FPV Westra, Department of Agriculture and Fisheries for Scotland.
- William Mackintosh Saunders Sutherland, Constable, Metropolitan Police.
- Mary Margretta Taggart, Nurse, Musgrave Park Hospital, Belfast.
- Robert Leslie Taylor, Retained Sub Officer, Shropshire Fire Brigade.
- Sidney Arthur Tebbs, Senior Commissioning Engineer (Site Foreman), Hilger Analytical. For services to Export.
- Arthur Thomas, Machine Shop Superintendent, Hunslet Holdings plc. (Died 22 November 1983.)
- Stewart Black Thomson. For services to the community on Fair Isle.
- Rubena Frances May Tibbs. For services to the community in Glastonbury, Somerset.
- Lewis Stephen Todd, Graphics Officer III, Ministry of Agriculture, Fisheries and Food.
- Frederick Aubrey Tomlinson, Chargehand, Packing and Loading Plant, Rugby Works, Rugby Portland Cement.
- Arthur Maynard Topping, Senior Aircraft Inspector, British Aerospace pic.
- Thomas William Townsend, Electrician, Wolverton Works, British Rail Engineering Ltd.
- Joseph Harold Treadwell, General Foreman, Oxfordshire County Council.
- Ethel Edna Turner. For services to Youth in Liverpool.
- Michael John Tynan, Sergeant, Royal Ulster Constabulary.
- Thomas George Tyson, Head Cowman, New Hall Farm, Garstang.
- John Wainwright, Fireman, Leicestershire Fire Brigade.
- George Mudie Imrie Wallace, Postman, Northern District Office, London, The Post Office.
- John Reginald Arthur Wallis, Officer, HM Youth Custody Centre, Everthorpe.
- Frederick Ernest Walter. For services to the Queen Victoria Rifles Association in Caterham, Surrey.
- John Robert William Warburton. For services to the community, particularly the elderly, in Hope Valley, Derbyshire.
- Reginald Ernest Joseph Ward, Professional and Technology Officer III, Ministry of Defence.
- John Reginald Watkin. For services to the community in Coventry.
- Thomas Westall. For services to the Bolton Lads' Club.
- John Brooke Westcott, Process Worker 3, Springfields Works, British Nuclear Fuels Ltd.
- Ernest Dudley Westwood, Driver, Refuse Service, Oxford City Council.
- Mary Edith Whipp. For services to the community in Surrey.
- Edith Elizabeth White. For services to the elderly in Northamptonshire.
- Geoffrey Vardon White, Technical Officer, Research Department, Special Investigations Division, British Telecom.
- Kathleen Anne White, Centre Youth Officer, Beaconsfield, Buckinghamshire Branch, British Red Cross Society.
- Leslie Whittle, lately Caretaker, Clifton Primary School, Hull.
- Kazimierz Wieclawski, Orthopaedic Shoemaker, Carnforth, Lancashire.
- Doris Violet Wigger. For services to the community in Surbiton and district.
- Arthur Holland Williams, Service Engineer, Wales Region, British Gas Corporation.
- Millicent Lenore Williams. For services to the community in Heytesbury, Wiltshire.
- Harry Wilson, Training Officer, North Gawber Colliery, Barnsley Area, National Coal Board.
- Reginald Edgar Carrington Windo, Service Engineer, South Western Region, British Gas Corporation.
- Bernard James Wood, Shipkeeper, Ministry of Defence.
- Elsie Wooldridge, Home Help, Kirklees Metropolitan District Council.
- Alfred John Wright, Porter/Cleaner, Office of Arts and Libraries.
- Isabel Deborah Wright, Forewoman Cleaner, Metropolitan Police.
- William Leonard Yarnell. For services to the community in Ambergate, Derbyshire.
- Alexander Samuel Young, Head Forester and Estate Foreman, Garden Estate.

Overseas Territories

- Jean Bolton, Senior Confidential Assistant, Quartering Office, Hong Kong.
- Joseph Anthony Bossino, Driver to Chief Minister, Gibraltar.
- Cheung Ping-Ieung, Assistant Housing Manager, Hong Kong.
- Fung Shiu-kit, Principal Survey Officer, Public Works Department, Hong Kong.
- Ho Lai Pui-yee, Senior Clerical Officer, Immigration Department, Hong Kong.
- Lee Po-ming, Liaison Officer Class I, Auxiliary Medical Service, Hong Kong.
- Lin Teh-min, Building Supervisor Class I, Public Works Department, Hong Kong.
- Fidelio Parody, lately Shift Engineer, Electricity Department, Gibraltar.

Australian States

State of Queensland

- Hilary Jessie Enrol Bloyce. For services to the community.
- Sophia Helen Day. For service to the community.
- Anna Bertha Denholm. For service to the community.
- Alice Mary Gillingham. For service to the sport of marching girls.
- Harold Francis McCosker, Superintendent (retired), Queensland Police Force.
- Colleen Ivy McLaughlin. For service to the community.
- Foomiyh Mellick. For service to the community in music.
- Albert Edward Peck. For service to the community.
- Johannes Antonius Maria Van Vegchel. For service to the community.
- Adolf Zillman. For service to the community.

State of Tasmania

- Fergus Edward Nathaniel Barnard. For services to the community.
- Jack McIntyre Bratt. For services to motor cycling.
- Amy Isabelle Jarvis. For services to the community.

=== Royal Red Cross (RRC) ===
- Lieutenant Colonel Edith Connor, TD, (431360), Queen Alexandra's Royal Army Nursing Corps, Territorial Army.
- Colonel Una O'Sullivan, ARRC, (432822), Queen Alexandra's Royal Army Nursing Corps.
- Lieutenant Colonel Anne Tidey (441166), Queen Alexandra's Royal Army Nursing Corps.

==== Associate of the Royal Red Cross (ARRC) ====
- Superintending Nursing Officer Maureen Rosina Humphreys, Queen Alexandra's Royal Naval Nursing Service.
- Lieutenant Colonel Brenda Houlison, TD, (480989), Queen Alexandra's Royal Army Nursing Corps, Territorial Army.
- Major Pamela Valerie Pimble (488747), Queen Alexandra's Royal Army Nursing Corps.
- Major Marion Betty Rushby (474171), Queen Alexandra's Royal Army Nursing Corps.
- Squadron Leader Mary Lindsay Pirie (408460), Princess Mary's Royal Air Force Nursing Service.

=== Air Force Cross (AFC) ===
Royal Navy

- Lieutenant Commander Peter Marshall Flutter.
- Lieutenant Commander Ronald Alan Goddard.
- Lieutenant Commander Adrian David Robert Thomas.

Royal Air Force

- Squadron Leader Malcolm Wakely Ball (608825).
- Squadron Leader David Bisset Farquhar (2616547).
- Squadron Leader David Johnson Fisher (608677).
- Squadron Leader Michael Colin Rudd (5200943).
- Squadron Leader Dennis Arthur Stangroom (684559).
- Squadron Leader David Charles Symonds (8024783).
- Flight Lieutenant Allan Montgomery Bone (8026216).
- Flight Lieutenant Darryl Stephen Willcocks (0120503), Royal Australian Air Force.

=== Air Force Medal (AFM) ===
- T4271215 Sergeant Philip Joseph Kelly, Royal Air Force.

=== Queen's Police Medal (QPM) ===
England and Wales

- Leonard Adams, Commander, Metropolitan Police.
- John Dulson Bethom, Chief Superintendent, Merseyside Police.
- Norman Leonard Chapple, Assistant Chief Constable, South Wales Constabulary.
- Gordon Sidney Elliott, Chief Superintendent, Dorset Police.
- Roy Keith Field, Chief Superintendent, Sussex Police.
- Anthony Michael Hayward, Commander, Metropolitan Police.
- Ian Hugh Kane, Chief Constable, Cambridgeshire Constabulary.
- Cecil Frank Lockyer, Chief Superintendent, Wiltshire Constabulary.
- David James Mitchell, Commander, Metropolitan Police.
- Glyn Parry, Chief Superintendent, Greater Manchester Police.
- Alan Harry Albert Stuart, Chief Superintendent, Kent Constabulary.
- Maurice Arthur Taylor, Commander, Metropolitan Police.
- Frank Trussler, Chief Superintendent, Surrey Constabulary.
- Ronald Oliver West, Chief Superintendent, Hampshire Constabulary.
- Louis Henry Whitton, Deputy Chief Constable, Gloucestershire Constabulary.

Scotland

- Jack Wilkinson Bowman, Assistant Chief Constable, Tayside Police.
- John Maclnnes Boyd, Assistant Chief Constable, Strathclyde Police.

Northern Ireland

- Thomas John Quinn, Chief Inspector, Royal Ulster Constabulary.

Gibraltar

- Michael Rowling, Commissioner of Police, Gibraltar.

Australian States

State of Queensland

- Donald Farquhar McDonald, Assistant Commissioner (Training & Legal), Queensland Police Force.

State of Tasmania

- Alan Bruce Swinton, Assistant Commissioner, Tasmania Police Force.

=== Queen's Fire Services Medal (QFSM) ===
England and Wales

- Roy Leonard Baldwin, Temporary Assistant Chief Officer, London Fire Brigade.
- Bernard Leslie Child, Deputy Chief Fire Officer, Air Force Department Fire Service, Ministry of Defence.
- Nigel Mussel White, Chief Officer, Somerset Fire Brigade.
- Peter Charles Rodgers, Deputy Chief Officer, East Sussex Fire Brigade.
- Garth Barrie Scotford, Deputy Chief Officer, Royal Berkshire Fire Brigade.
- William Tozer, Deputy Chief Officer, Durham Fire Brigade.

Channel Islands

- James William Cassaday, Chief Officer, Guernsey Fire Brigade.

Hong Kong

- Lok-bun Lam, CPM, Chief Fire Officer, Hong Kong Fire Services.

=== Colonial Police Medal (CPM) ===
- Christopher John Westaway Bagley, Senior Superintendent, Royal Hong Kong Police Force.
- Chan Shing-cheong, Assistant Divisional Officer, Hong Kong Fire Services.
- Chan Yip-kun, Chief Inspector, Royal Hong Kong Auxiliary Police Force.
- Peter Chau Cham-chiu, Senior Superintendent, Royal Hong Kong Auxiliary Police Force.
- Cheung Ping, Principal Fireman, Hong Kong Fire Services.
- Fung Yiu-wing, Station Sergeant, Royal Hong Kong Police Force.
- Li Sik-tim, Principal Fireman, Hong Kong Fire Services.
- Ngai Ki-shun, Sergeant, Royal Hong Kong Police Force.
- Michael George Frith Prew, Senior Superintendent, Royal Hong Kong Police Force.
- Tsung Yung-min, Station Sergeant, Royal Hong Kong Police Force.
- Wong, Tsan-kwong, Senior Superintendent, Royal Hong Kong Police Force.

=== Queen's Commendation for Valuable Service in the Air ===
Royal Navy

- Lieutenant Commander Keith Norman Atkin.

Royal Air Force

- Wing Commander Henry Arthur William Drew, AFC, (4230447).
- Squadron Leader Paul Day (4231352).
- Squadron Leader Andrew Peter Kirk (8024890).
- Squadron Leader Barry Robert Neal (688715).
- Squadron Leader Russell Peart, AFC, (4233078).
- Squadron Leader Ian Walter Sampson (4231392).
- Squadron Leader William Langlands Whyte (4233191).
- Flight Lieutenant Malcolm William Brown (508282).
- Flight Lieutenant Frederick Allister Da Costa (4230194).
- Flight Lieutenant Philip Desmond Dye (5201059).
- Flight Lieutenant Henry William Pottle (4233536).
- Flight Lieutenant John Tunaley Prince (4230357).
- Flight Lieutenant John Rochfort (4232420).
- Flight Lieutenant Robin John Martyn Thomas (4232789).
- Master Engineer Thomas Francis Fortune (V1960329).
- Master Engineer Graham Rex Turner (P1942143).

United Kingdom

- Edwin Thomas Wild, Pilot Training Manager, Orion Airways plc, East Midlands Airport, Derby.

== Cook Islands ==
=== Order of the British Empire ===
==== Officer of the Order of the British Empire (OBE) ====
Civil Division

- Marguerite Nora Eikura Kitimira Story. For public and community service in the Cook Islands.

==== Member of the Order of the British Empire (MBE) ====
Civil Division

- The Honourable Tangaroa Tangaroa, MP. For services to the people of the Cook Islands.

== Fiji ==
=== Order of Saint Michael and Saint George ===
==== Companion of the Order of St Michael and St George (CMG) ====
- Jonati Mavoa, Minister for Agriculture and Fisheries.

=== Order of the British Empire ===
==== Officer of the Order of the British Empire (OBE) ====
Civil Division

- Chandra Prakash Bidesi. For parliamentary, municipal and community service.
- Susan Parkinson. For services to health and nutrition.
- Ratu Ilaitia Vuwai Makaba Waqanivalu, MM. For public and community service.

==== Member of the Order of the British Empire (MBE) ====
Civil Division

- Donald Henry Bull. For services to the community.
- Alan Leslie Frith. Assistant General Manager (Training and Personnel), Native Land Trust Board.
- Rama Mudaliar. Deputy Chairman, Fiji Road Safety Council.
- Misiada Sila. For services to education.

=== Companion of the Imperial Service Order (ISO) ===
- Isei Tuganilau Tudreu. Senior Observer, Meteorological Services.

=== British Empire Medal (BEM) ===
Civil Division

- Esava Nabuta. Supervisor, Water.
- Bhawani Prasad. Principal Supervising Officer (Water).
- Nemaai Vaka Tuitokova, ED. Executive Officer, Native Land Trust Board.

== The Bahamas ==
=== Order of Saint Michael and Saint George ===
==== Companion of the Order of St Michael and St George (CMG) ====
- The Right Reverend Michael Hartley Eldon, Bishop of Nassau and The Bahamas.

=== Order of the British Empire ===
==== Officer of the Order of the British Empire (OBE) ====
Civil Division

- Agnes June Maura, MVO, Deputy Permanent Secretary, Cabinet Office.

==== Member of the Order of the British Empire (MBE) ====
Civil Division

- Hester Ursula Cunningham. For services to education.
- George Bernald Dorsett, JP. For service to agriculture and the community.
- Winifred Caroline Mortimer. For services to the community.
- Errington Rahming, Assistant Superintendent, Royal Bahamas Police Force.

=== British Empire Medal (BEM) ===
Civil Division

- Delton Bain. For services to nursing.
- Lillian Coakley. For services as a librarian.
- Emma Evelyn Cooper. For services to teaching.
- Earl Percy Johnson, JP. For services to the community.
- Louise McDonald. For services to teaching.
- Amy Roberts. For services to education.
- Winifred Sweeting. For services to musical education.

== Papua New Guinea ==
=== Order of Saint Michael and Saint George ===
==== Companion of the Order of St Michael and St George (CMG) ====
- Leo Joseph Hannett. For services to the North Solomons Province.

=== Order of the British Empire ===
==== Knight Commander of the Order of the British Empire (KBE) ====
Civil Division

- The Honourable Barry Blyth Holloway, CBE, MP. For services to politics and government.

==== Commander of the Order of the British Empire (CBE) ====
Military Division

- Brigadier General Gago Maipakai Mamae, OBE, (82960), Papua New Guinea Defence Force.

Civil Division

- The Honourable Mr. Justice Warwick John Andrew. For services to the law.
- Sinaka Vakai Goava, MBE. For public and community service.

==== Officer of the Order of the British Empire (OBE) ====
Civil Division

- Nigel Robert Agonia. For public service.
- Henry George Ewing. For services to banking.
- Henry Charles Harry Humphreys, MP. For services to the community.
- Francis Rau Iramu. For services to the law.
- Joel Nelson Maiah. For services to local and provincial government.
- Dr. Wilfred Keina Moi, BEM. For services to medicine.
- Geoffrey Navalagou Mosuwadoga. For services to culture.

==== Member of the Order of the British Empire (MBE) ====
Military Division

- Major Peter Michael Dennis (860351), Royal Australian Infantry.
- Chief Warrant Officer Tomi Tuges (82004), Papua New Guinea Defence Force.

Civil Division

- Jacinta Kodana. For services to women.
- Bernadette Lafe. For services to women.
- Gerardus Johanmis Antonius Lucas. For public service.
- Michael Oka Mondia. For services to the Corrective Institutions Service.
- Henry Moses. For services to industrial relations.
- George Panao. For public and community services.
- Nenk Pasul. For services to government.
- Harry Friedrich Pelgen. For services to the community.
- Henao Rei. For services to the community.
- Emily Saeron. For services to religion.
- Peter Tapural. For services to local government.
- Arnold Tobata, Sergeant Major, Royal Papua New Guinea Constabulary.
- Leo Joseph Woo. For services to the community.
- Famundi Yaviri. For services to politics.

=== British Empire Medal (BEM) ===
Military Division

- Lance Corporal Disasala Babowa (81742), Papua New Guinea Defence Force.
- Sergeant Kagilea Rawalo (81306), Papua New Guinea Defence Force.

Civil Division

- Kome Arua. For services to health.
- Gabriel Mawai Birua, Sergeant, Royal Papua New Guinea Constabulary.
- Philip Balikien Mauwa, Senior Constable, Royal Papua New Guinea Constabulary.
- Moroku Pokuaea, Sergeant, Royal Papua New Guinea Constabulary.
- Tinabagawok Saganiok. For services to health.
- Hesingut Babai Wangu. For public service.
- Nongia Wiru. For public service as an interpreter.

=== Queen's Police Medal (QPM) ===
- Leo Dion, Assistant Commissioner, Royal Papua New Guinea Constabulary.
- Cosmos Pulai, Chief Superintendent, Royal Papua New Guinea Constabulary.

== Solomon Islands ==
=== Order of the British Empire ===
==== Officer of the Order of the British Empire (OBE) ====
Civil Division

- Sister (Mrs.) Rhona Sisiolo. For services to nursing.
- Frederick Soaki, CPM, Commissioner, Royal Solomon Islands Police Force.

==== Member of the Order of the British Empire (MBE) ====
Civil Division

- Kuria Hughes. For services to women.
- Eliphalet Kakae. For services to commerce.
- Quan Pak Yee. For services to commerce.

=== British Empire Medal (BEM) ===
Civil Division

- Dominico Bakeua. For services to the community.
- Fred Maedola. For services to local music.
- Loea Mamata. For services to fishing.
- Luke Susuta. For services to broadcasting.

== Saint Lucia ==
=== Order of the British Empire ===
==== Commander of the Order of the British Empire (CBE) ====
Civil Division

- The Honourable Joseph Allan Robert Bousquet. Minister of Health and Housing.

==== Officer of the Order of the British Empire (OBE) ====
Civil Division

- Lennard Michael Augier, MBE. Chief Engineer, Public Works.
- Lucius Miller Mason. Eastern Caribbean High Commissioner to Canada (retired).

==== Member of the Order of the British Empire (MBE) ====
Civil Division

- Norman St. Amatus Etienne. For public service.
- Carmen Christiana Rene. For service to education.
- Dunstan Gerbert Raphael St Omer. For service to art.

=== British Empire Medal (BEM) ===
Civil Division

- (Sister) Margaret Mary Auguste. For social work among the poor.
- Edward George Deterville. For service as a pharmacist.

== Saint Vincent and the Grenadines ==
=== Order of the British Empire ===
==== Officer of the Order of the British Empire (OBE) ====
Civil Division

- Norris Roosevelt Cummings. For public service.
- Robert Bertrand Alexander Richards. For services to education.

==== Member of the Order of the British Empire (MBE) ====
Civil Division

- Patrick Eugene Prescod. For services to music.

== Antigua and Barbuda ==
=== Order of the British Empire ===
==== Officer of the Order of the British Empire (OBE) ====
Civil Division

- Sydney Leopold Sylvanus Walling, MBE. For services to scouting, the Church and to sport.

=== Queen's Police Medal (QPM) ===
- Roy Fitzgerald Baptiste, CPM. Deputy Commissioner, Royal Antigua and Barbuda Police Force.
