= Peter Lane =

Peter Lane may refer to:

- Peter Lane, Baron Lane of Horsell (1925–2009), British politician and businessman
- Sir Peter Richard Lane (born 1953), British judge
- Peter Van Zandt Lane (born 1985), American composer
