= Arthur Gold (sports administrator) =

British athlete and administrator

Sir Arthur Gold

Personal information
- Birth name: Arthur Abraham Gold
- Nationality: British (English)
- Born: 10 January 1917; Hackney, London, England
- Died: 25 May 2001 (aged 84); Barnet, England
- Occupation: Sports administrator

Sport
- Sport: Athletics
- Event: high jump
- Club: L.A.C

Sir Arthur Abraham Gold CBE (10 January 1917 – 25 May 2001) was one of the world's best-known sporting administrators, notable as a fearless and uncompromising enemy of drug-taking He led the British athletics teams at three Olympic Games (at Mexico in 1968, Munich, 1972, and Montreal, 1976) and was commandant of the English Commonwealth Games Team at Brisbane (1982), Edinburgh (1986) and Auckland (1990) and of the British Olympic Team at Albertville and Barcelona in 1992.

== Biography ==
Arthur Gold was born on 10 January 1917, in a Jewish family, to Mark and Leah Gold. He studied at the Grocers' Company School. Later, he attended the Loughborough Summer School at the age of 17.

As an athlete, he represented Great Britain on the tours of Finland and Norway in 1937 at high jump. Gold finished third behind John Lunn Newman in the high jump event at the 1937 AAA Championships.

In 1965 Gold became secretary of the governing body for athletics, the British Amateur Athletics Board, a predecessor of UK Athletics. In the 1974 Birthday Honours he was appointed CBE.

Between 1979 and 1990 Gold was chairman of the Commonwealth Games Council.

He was appointed Knight bachelor in the 1984 New Year Honours.

From 1984 to 1992 Gold was chairman of the British Olympic Association and was later its vice president.

Gold also held the position of honorary life president of the European Athletics Association.

In 1991 Gold received the Olympic Order (silver) for his services.
