= Keith Clayton =

- Born: Keith Martin Clayton; 25 September 1928; Wandsworth, London, England
- Died: 12 February 2013 (aged 84); Thorpe St Andrew, Norfolk, England
- Education: Bedales School; University of Sheffield; University of London
- Spouses: Jean Mary Wilkinson (m. 1952; div. 1976) Jennifer Nan Haschak (m. 1976; death 2013)
- Children: 4
- Awards: Patron's Medal
- Scientific career
- Fields: Quantitative geomorphology
- Workplaces: London School of Economics; State University of New York at Binghamton; University of East Anglia

Keith Martin Clayton (25 September 1928 – 12 February 2013) was an English geographer and environmental scientist. Educated at Bedales School and at the University of Sheffield, he was a demonstrator at the University of Nottingham from 1949 to 1951. Clayton was an lecturer in geography at the London School of Economics (LSE) from 1953 until he was promoted to reader in 1964. He was the first dean of the School of Environmental Sciences at the University of East Anglia (UEA) and professor of environmental sciences in 1967 until 1971, when he established the UEA's Climatic Research Unit. Clayton was the UEA's pro-vice-chancellor from 1971 to 1973 and was director of the Centre of East Anglian Studies between 1974 and 1981. He retired from the UEA in 1993. Clayton was appointed Commander of the Order of the British Empire (CBE) in the 1984 New Year Honours and received the Patron's Medal from the Royal Geographical Society.

== Early life ==
Clayton was born in Wandsworth, London on 25 September 1928. He was the child of the tax inspector Edgar Francis Clayton and his wife Constance Annie (née Clark), who resided in Ipswich when his birth was registered. Clayton received his education at Bedales School in Hampshire. He graduated from the University of Sheffield with a first-class undergraduate degree in geography in 1949. Following the completion of his undergraduate degree, he remained at the university for an Master of Science degree in 1951 and a Doctor of Philosophy at the University of London in 1958, although he pursued the two qualifications in parallel with his work as a demonstrator at the University of Nottingham from 1949 to 1951. Clayton took two years off to do his National Service in the Royal Engineers between 1951 and 1953.

== Career ==
In 1953, he was appointed assistant lecturer in geography at the London School of Economics (LSE), investigating the formation of landforms. From 1960 to 1962, Clayton held a visiting post at the State University of New York at Binghamton. He investigated glacial landforms in the Finger Lakes region of the state of New York. In 1960, Clayton founded the abstracting and indexing company GeoAbstracts, which made it easier for environmental scientists geographers to locate one another's work. He received a back grant from the Royal Geographical Society in March 1964 for his studies on British drift deposits. That same year, Clayton was promoted to reader in geography at LSE.

In March 1967, the University of East Anglia (UEA) in Norwich setup the School of Environmental Sciences and Clayton was appointed the school's first dean and professor of environmental sciences starting on 1 October 1968. In 1971, he created the university's Climatic Research Unit and appointed the climatologist Hubert Lamb of the UK Meteorological Office to head it. He served as pro-vice-chancellor of UEA from 1971 to 1973, and served as director of the Centre of East Anglian Studies between 1974 and 1981. Clayton was on the Natural Environment Research Council between 1970 and 1973 and its remote sensing working party. He was a member of the University Grants Committee from 1973 to 1984, serving as vice-chair and implementing its work in supervising the government cuts in university spending.

He was on numerous national committees including the National Radiological Protection Board from 1980 to 1985, the Committee on Medical Aspects of Radiation in the Environment from 1985 to 2001, and the Dounreay Particles Advisory Group of the Scottish Environment Protection Agency between 2000 and 2006. Clayton was elected chairman of the Broadland Housing Association in 1979. In 1983, he was appointed chairman of the working group established to coordinate the merger of Ulster Polytechnic and the New University of Ulster. Clayton served a second term as dean of the School of Environmental Sciences from 1987 to 1993. He retired from UEA in 1993. During his retirement, Clayton was elected as a Liberal Democrat councillor on Broadland District Council in the Thorpe St. Andrew North West constituency from 1994 to 1998, having been elected to the council to represent the same constituency in May 1986. He recommended the encouragement of greener travel by way of a mileage allowance payment to bicycle riders en route to work. Clayton was a trustee of the Norfolk Windmills Trust and supported an initiative to restore approximately 15 windmills in the Broads to generate electricity. Between 1994 and 1998, he was a member of the Broads Authority that manages the Norfolk Broads.

Clayton conducted much of his varied research in East Anglia, travelling in the North Sea and the Wash in the research boat Envoy. His research expertise was in quantitative geomorphology. He continued to carry out research on glaciers and coastal erosion and was an early user of satellite technology to monitor changes in the Earth's surface. He championed the term 'coastal managed realignment' in the years before it became common to the public and policy-makers. Clayton was heavily opposed to artificial coastal engineering, strongly believing that healthy sand-rich beaches, fed by natural erosion and deposition cycles, were a more sustainable coastal defence than concrete seawalls that he described as "intrusions into a mobile geological landscape". He supported "social justice" through appropriate compensation and promoted roof space access for flood-endangered properties. In 1991, he argued for parts of the North Norfolk coast to be left to the sea. In a 1995 report co-authored with colleagues for the Countryside Commission on the possible impact of global warming on tourism, Clayton suggested that the rise of global temperatures rise in the Mediterranean Sea would mean it would become so unpleasantly hot that more people might be expected to go on holiday in Britain.

== Personal life ==
Clayton was twice married. His first marriage was to the trainee schoolteacher Jean Mary Wilkinson from 4 August 1952 to 1976. There were four children of the marriage. Clayton's second marriage was to the television company secretary Jennifer Nan Haschak on 29 December 1976. He was stepfather to her son. Clayton died of cerebrovascular disease at his home in Thorpe St Andrew, Norfolk on 12 February 2013, and received a private burial.

== Recognition ==
He was appointed Commander of the Order of the British Empire (CBE) for "services to the University Grants Committee and to the University of East Anglia" in the 1984 New Year Honours. Clayton was invested with the CBE by Elizabeth II at a ceremony at Buckingham Palace on 21 February 1984. In May 1989, he received the Patron's Medal from the Royal Geographical Society.
