= Harris Academy Purley =

Location
- Kendra Hall Road; South Croydon, Greater London, England, CR2 6DT; United Kingdom; 51°21′12″N 0°06′34″W

Information
- Former name: Haling Manor High School
- Type: Academy
- Established: 1 September 2009; 16 years ago
- Local authority: London Borough of Croydon
- Specialist: Sport and Enterprise
- Department for Education URN: 135955 Tables
- Ofsted: Reports
- Principal: Tim Allman
- Gender: Coeducational
- Age: 11 to 18
- Enrolment: 903
- Houses: 4
- Website: www.harrispurley.org.uk

Harris Academy Purley (formerly Haling Manor High School) is an academic secondary school in South Croydon, England. It is also part of the Harris Federation. Haling Manor High School was one of only fifteen schools in the country to be awarded specialist status as a music school.

== History ==
Before becoming an 'Academy' the school was named Haling Manor High School. There were two wings to the school for many years: Pampisford Wing which was originally Croydon Secondary Technical School; and the Kendra Wing which was originally South Croydon Secondary Modern School. Origins went further back to what was Waddon Secondary School. (There was a famous entry in the punishment book from that era: 'X' received 6 strokes of the cane for letting off a paper bag during an air raid' - cited by Michael Round, previously headmaster.) The first headteacher of Haling Manor was a Mr. Fox (not to be confused with Richard Fox, Head of Science and Senior Master who spent his entire career at the school) and the first Deputy Head was J.R.Piper. Michael Round replaced Fox and was headmaster 1975-1996 (21 years). His then deputy, John Troake, took over, and was succeeded by Esther Bauman, until August 2009 when the school was passed to the Harris Foundation.

Up until 31 August 2009, the school was a comprehensive Secondary High School.

From 1 September 2009, it became part of the Harris Federation of schools, and was renamed to Harris Academy Purley, under the leadership of Carol-Anne Alcock. Alcock had previously been the headteacher at Selsdon High School.

Despite its name, the school is situated in South Croydon, not Purley.

== Performance ==
The school had a GCSE pass rate of 23% achieving 5 A*-C grades (as of July 2009) including English and Maths and had one of the highest achievement rates in the capital when taking into account CVA (contextual value added) meaning that from relatively low prior attainment pupils show good levels of progress.

As Haling Manor High School (Headmaster: Mr John Troake MA) 76% of all year 11 students left in 2008 with 5 A* - C grades, above the national average. 41% of all children left the school with a modern foreign language grade A*-C in 2009 again beating most Croydon schools and the national average. The school is ranked 78th in the country for CVA. This ranks the school in the top 3% of schools for the amount of progress students make..
