= Chris Gittins =

British character actor (1902–1988)

Chris Gittins (4 July 1902 – 21 August 1988) was a British character actor who played the role of Walter Gabriel in the long-running BBC radio series The Archers.

Gittins was born in Stourbridge, Worcestershire. He was the son of a gas fitter, who became involved with the theatre as an actor, producer and director, later alternating between the theatre and radio. His first radio part was on 13 November 1935. He specialised in Black Country and Midlands accents. As well as The Archers and radio plays, he took part in Children's Hour and the British Forces Broadcasting Service.

He played the role of Walter Gabriel, a tenant farmer, in The Archers, for 35 years from 1953 to 1988, and was known nationally for the character's phrases "Oh dear, oh lor" and "Me old pal, me old beauty". He also appeared in several TV series, including Hilda Lessways (1959) and Swizzlewick (1964).

He died as a widower, in Stourbridge, leaving one daughter. He was awarded the MBE in 1984.
