= Phillip Edwards (Royal Navy officer) =

British naval officer

Rear-Admiral John Phillip Edwards CB MVO (13 February 1927 – 12 December 2014) was a Royal Navy officer who later became bursar of Wadham College, University of Oxford. He was a trustee of the Oxford Preservation Trust.
