= Peter Richard Lane =

British judge

Sir Richard Lane
- Royal coat of arms of the United Kingdom

High Court Judge King's Bench Division
- In office 2 October 2017 – 1 February 2024
- Monarch: Charles III

Personal details
- Born: 26 April 1953 (age 73) United Kingdom
- Education: University of California, Berkeley; Hertford College, Oxford

Sir Peter Richard Lane (born 26 April 1953) is a retired British High Court judge.

== Early life and education ==
Lane was educated Worcester Royal Grammar School. He studied at Hertford College, Oxford and took a first-class BA in jurisprudence in 1974. He completed an LLM at University of California, Berkeley in 1975.

== Career ==
He was called to the bar at Middle Temple in 1976, and practised from 1977 to 1980. He was lecturer in law at QMUL from 1978 to 1980. From 1980 to 1985, he was assistant parliamentary counsel. In 1985, he qualified as a solicitor and served as solicitor and parliamentary agent from 1985 to 2001; he was partner at Rees & Freres from 1987 to 2001.

He was appointed a part-time immigration adjudicator from 1996 to 2001, becoming full time from 2001 to 2003. From 2003, he served as vice-president and senior immigration judge at the Immigration Appeal Tribunal and in 2010 he was appointed a judge of the Upper Tribunal (Immigration and Asylum Chamber) until 2017. He was legal member of the Special Immigration Appeals Commission from 2005 to 2017. He was President of the First-tier Tribunal (General Regulatory Chamber) from 2014 to 2017 and served as a deputy High Court judge from 2016 to 2017.

=== High Court appointment ===
On 2 October 2017, he was appointed a judge of the High Court and assigned to the Queen's Bench Division. He took the customary knighthood in the same year. He has been president of the Upper Tribunal (Immigration and Asylum Chamber) since 2017.

== Personal life ==
In 1980, he married Shelley Ilene Munjack (a retired judge), with whom he has one son and one daughter.
