= Glenwood High School, Glenrothes =

Coordinates: 56.19702°N 3.206338°W

Glenwood High School
- Glenrothes, Fife; Scotland

Information
- Type: High School
- Motto: Encouraging Excellence
- Established: 1962
- Head teacher: Kirsty Ferguson
- Teaching staff: 70 (approx.)
- Grades: National Qualifications (CFE)
- Enrollment: 872 (approx.)(2013-14 figures as of November 2013)
- Colors: black, red & white
- Website: https://glenwood.greenhousecms.co.uk/

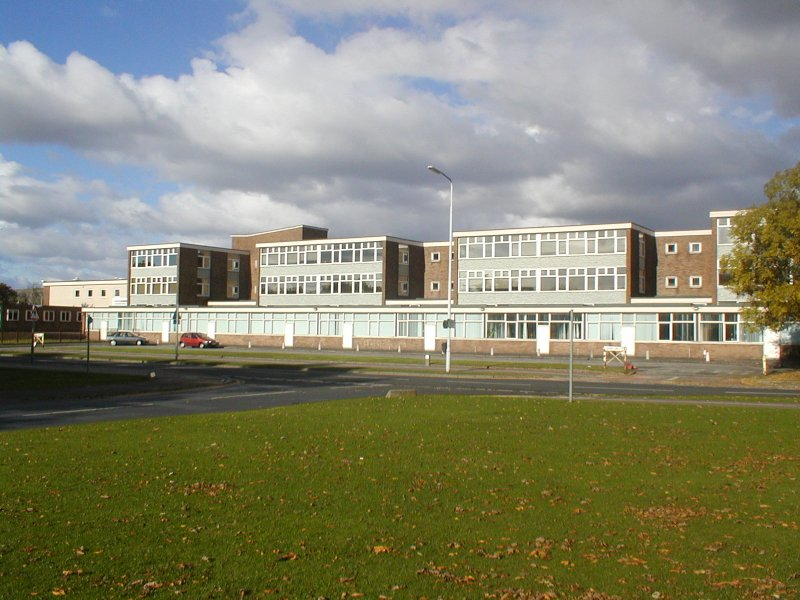
Glenwood High School

Glenwood High School is a comprehensive, co-educational and non-denominational school serving the western part of the town of Glenrothes, Fife, Scotland together with communities to the north and west.

== History ==
The building originally opened in 1962 and was fully renovated and extended in 1982. These renovations included adding on a second building known as the H block by pupils and staff. The schools has modern facilities such as a well equipped Library and Information Centre; modern gym facilities including a games hall, gymnasium, swimming pool, fitness suite and dance studio. There are also extensive playing fields and a blaze pitch. There are also purpose built Theatre Arts facilities including a purpose built suite of music rooms and a primary Drama Studio. The school also has eight computer rooms including 2 WiFi rooms (added in 2013). In February 2008 the school completed works to allow for disabled access by fitting lifts and ramps into the original main block and the H block taking users from the ground floor to the 2nd in the main block, and the ground floor to the 1st floor in the H block with ease.

In 2018 Fife Council announced plans to merge the school with nearby Glenrothes High School. These plans were scrapped in 2025 due to a lack of council funds, with the focus being shifted to refurbishment of both schools.

Destination of school leavers 2009–10
	Glenwood High School	Fife average	Scotland average
Total pupils	920	-	-
Leavers in 2009–10	190	-	-
Higher Education	18%	33%	36%
Further Education	54%	37%	27%
Training	6%	4%	5%
Employed	8%	12%	19%
Unemployed	13%	13%	12%

== House system ==
The pupils of Glenwood High School are separated into three different houses and each have their own house colour.

The Houses are:

- Bishop: Green
- Falkland: Yellow
- Lomond: Blue

The Head Boy and Head Girl and the rest of the Pupil Leadership Team are elected by the Senior Management team, and the previous year’s Head Boy and Head Girl. S3, S4 & S5 pupils can apply to be a prefect. Pupils in S6 automatically become part of the prefect team. All prefects are monitored by the Pupil Leadership Team.
