= Barbara Sabey =

Road safety engineer

Barbara Ethel Sabey
- Born: c. 1928; Northampton
- Died: 24 February 2013
- Occupation: Road safety engineer

Barbara Ethel Sabey (c. 1928 – 24 February 2013) was a road safety engineer at the Transport Research Laboratory in the United Kingdom who made significant contributions to the area of road safety. Her research emphasised the strong factor of human error in road accidents, and her safety recommendations are now commonplace preventative safety measures used in rural and urban planning.

== Education ==
Sabey graduated with a PhD in physics, with a dissertation focused on the friction interactions between tyres and roads, especially during wet conditions.

== Road safety engineering ==
For most of her career, Sabey worked for the Transport Research Laboratory in the United Kingdom, where she made significant contributions to road safety engineering. The ramifications of her research appear in a number of standard preventative measures commonplace today, such as tyre tread depth rules, mandatory seat belt laws, blood alcohol content limits, and general aspects of road design. For instance, she led some of the first roadside surveys of blood alcohol content in drivers, which highlighted the prevalence and safety significance of drunk driving. In 1961 she was the Principal Scientific Officer in the Surface Characteristic Section of the Road Research Laboratories. She addressed the Women's Engineering Society and took its members on a tour of the facilities.

In the 1980s, she led the Urban Safety Project, a large-scale exploration of different hazard reduction systems in urban settings; many traffic calming concepts originated from this work. Based on her previous research, Sabey learned that human error contributes to about 95% of all road accidents, thereby helping focus safety improvement efforts in the human factors arena.

Sabey advised many transportation agencies both within the United Kingdom and abroad in New Zealand, where she spent a one year sabbatical. In recognition of her contributions to science, she received an honorary doctorate degree from Middlesex University and in 1983 the Imperial Service Order. In 1973, she also became the first woman to chair the Civil Service Motoring Association.

== Personal life ==
Sabey was a fond enthusiast of competitive driving, and she often raced in her Mini Cooper, competing in the RAC Rally of Great Britain in 1968, 1969, and 1970.

Sabey lived her entire adult life in the Maidenhead area of England, and died on 24 February 2013, from a heart attack and stroke.

Her archive was donated to the Institute for Transport Studies at the University of Leeds in 2014.
