= Peter Lane, Baron Lane of Horsell =

British politician and businessman (1925–2009)

The Right Honourable The Lord Lane of Horsell FCA

Member of the House of Lords
- Lord Temporal
- Life peerage 17 July 1990 – 9 January 2009

Personal details
- Born: 29 January 1925
- Died: 9 January 2009 (aged 83)

Peter Stewart Lane, Baron Lane of Horsell, FCA (29 January 1925 – 9 January 2009) was a British politician and businessman.

A Conservative Member of the House of Lords, he was created a life peer on 17 July 1990 as Baron Lane of Horsell, of Woking in the County of Surrey.

After a spell in the Royal Navy, he trained as an accountant and rose to be senior partner of Binder Hamlyn from 1979 to 1992. He was an active freemason.

He was chairman of the executive of the National Union of the Conservative Party from 1986 and 1991 and had previously chaired the traumatic party conference in 1983 during which Cecil Parkinson resigned after his affair with Sara Keays had become public.

Later in life he was also chairman of Action on Addiction and the Nuffield Hospital, and held a number of directorships.

== Arms ==
Coat of arms of Peter Lane, Baron Lane of Horsell

Coronet
Coronet of a Baron
Crest
A Demi Lion Azure, Head and Mane Or, charged on the body with pierced Mullets each of six-points Or, and supporting by both forepaws a Branch of Oak fructed of five Acorns Gold.
Escutcheon
Per pale and per chevron Azure and Or, counter-changed, on a Chevron Gules, between three Mullets of six points counter-changed and pierced of the field, three Leopards' Heads Or, langued Azure,
Supporters
Dexter: A Male Griffin reguardant Argent, its Head Neck Mane and Forelegs Or, rayed Or, beaked Argent, and holding in the beak a Double-Warded Key bow downwards Gold.

Sinister: a Strawberry Road horse proper, maned and hooved Or, its head elevated and reguardant holding in its jaws a Double-Warded Key bow downwards Gold. The whole upon a Compartment consisting of a Grassy Mount raised on each side and growing therefrom two Sprigs of Oak each fructed of an Acorn Gold.

Motto
GARDE LE DROIT (Maintain the right)
