= List of schools in Croydon =

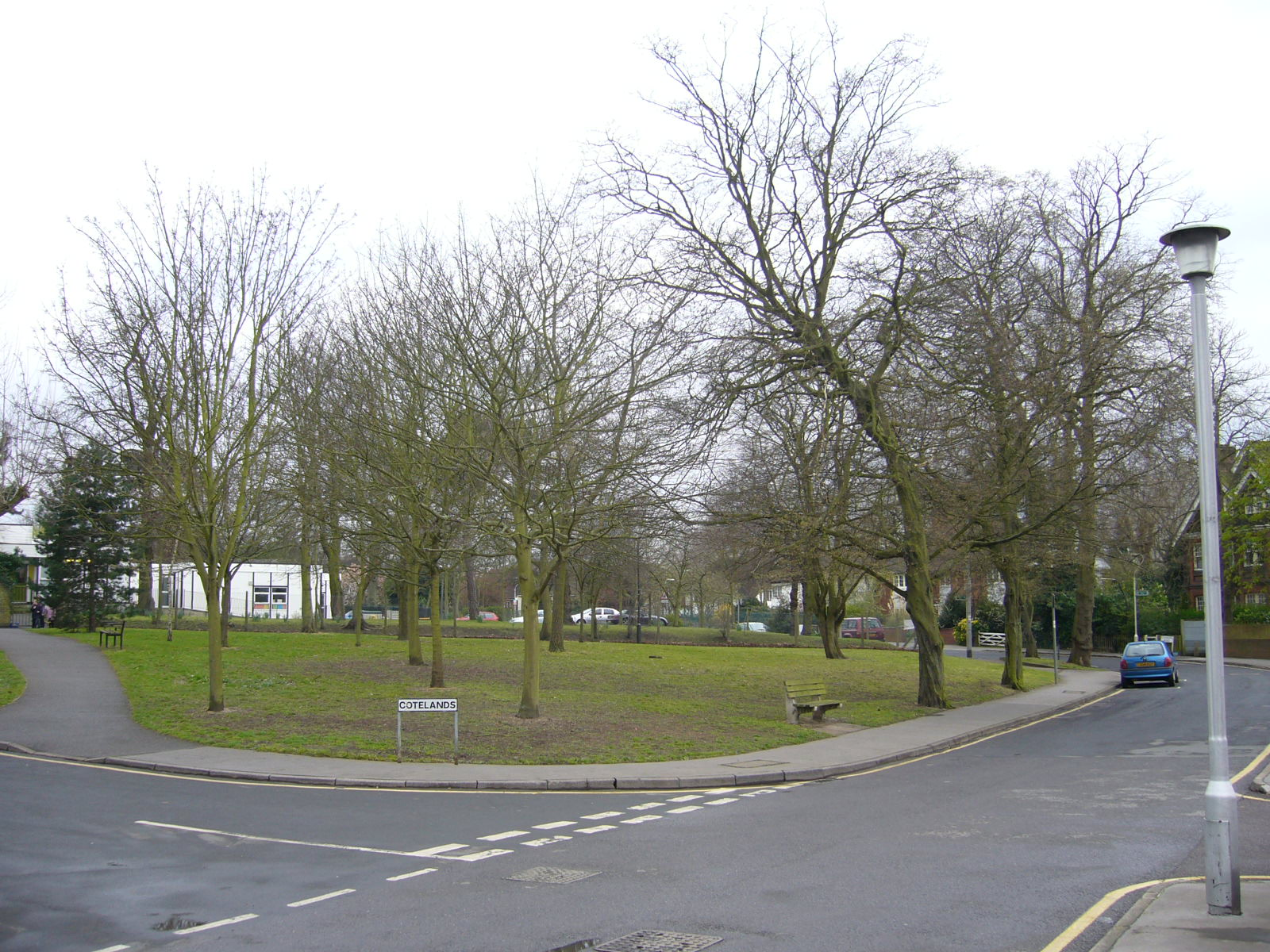
Cotelands with Park Hill Infants School in the background

The London Borough of Croydon is one of the boroughs in London with the most schools. They include primary schools (95), secondary schools (21) and four further education establishments. Croydon College has its main building in Croydon, it is a low rise building. John Ruskin College is one of the other colleges in the borough, located in Addington and Coulsdon College in Coulsdon. South Norwood has been the home of Spurgeon's College, a world-famous Baptist theological college, since 1923; Spurgeon's is located on South Norwood Hill and currently has some 1000 students. Winterbourne Junior Boys' and Winterbourne Junior Girls Schools are the only single-sex state primary schools in the United Kingdom. The London Borough of Croydon is the local education authority for the borough. Croydon operates a comprehensive system of education but there are a number of formerly selective schools in the borough; including The John Fisher School and Coloma Convent Girls' School

== State-funded schools ==
=== Primary schools ===
- Aerodrome Primary Academy, Waddon
- All Saints CE Primary School, Upper Norwood
- Applegarth Academy, New Addington
- Ark Oval Primary Academy, Addiscombe
- Atwood Primary Academy, Sanderstead
- Beaumont Primary School, Purley
- Beulah Infants' School, Thornton Heath
- Beulah Junior School, Thornton Heath
- Broadmead Primary School, Croydon
- Castle Hill Academy, New Addington
- Chestnut Park Primary School, Croydon
- Chipstead Valley Primary School, Coulsdon
- Christ Church CE Primary School, Purley
- Coulsdon CE Primary School, Coulsdon
- Courtwood Primary School, Croydon
- The Crescent Primary School Selhurst
- Cypress Primary School, South Norwood
- David Livingstone Academy, Thornton Heath
- Davidson Primary Academy, Croydon
- Downsview Primary and Nursery School, Upper Norwood
- Ecclesbourne Primary School, Thornton Heath
- Elmwood Infant School, Croydon
- Elmwood Junior School, Croydon
- Fairchildes Primary School, New Addington
- Forest Academy, Shirley
- Forestdale Primary School, Croydon
- Gilbert Scott Primary School, South Croydon
- Gonville Academy, Thornton Heath
- Good Shepherd RC Primary School, New Addington
- Greenvale Primary School, South Croydon
- Gresham Primary School, Sanderstead
- Harris Primary Academy Benson, Shirley
- Harris Primary Academy Croydon, Croydon
- Harris Primary Academy Haling Park, South Croydon
- Harris Primary Academy Kenley, Kenley
- Harris Primary Academy Purley Way, Waddon
- The Hayes Primary School, Kenley
- Heathfield Academy, South Croydon
- Heavers Farm Primary School, South Norwood
- Howard Primary School, Croydon
- Kenley Primary School, Whyteleafe
- Kensington Avenue Primary School, Thornton Heath
- Keston Primary School, Coulsdon
- Krishna Avanti Primary School, Croydon
- Margaret Roper RC Primary School, Purley
- The Minster Junior School, Croydon
- The Minster Nursery and Infant School, Croydon
- Monks Orchard Primary School, Croydon
- New Valley Primary School, Purley
- Norbury Manor Primary School, Croydon
- Oasis Academy Byron, Coulsdon
- Oasis Academy Ryelands, South Norwood
- Oasis Academy Shirley Park, Ashburton
- Orchard Way Primary School, Croydon
- The Minster Junior School, Croydon
- The Minster Nursery and Infant School, Croydon
- Park Hill Infant School, Croydon
- Park Hill Junior School, Croydon
- Paxton Academy, Thornton Heath
- Purley Oaks Primary School, South Croydon
- Regina Coeli RC Primary School, South Croydon
- Ridgeway Primary School, South Croydon
- Robert Fitzroy Academy, Croydon
- Rockmount Primary School, Upper Norwood
- Rowdown Primary School, New Addington
- St Aidan's RC Primary School, Coulsdon
- St Chad's RC Primary School, Selhurst
- St Cyprian's Greek Orthodox Primary Academy, Thornton Heath
- St James The Great RC Primary and Nursery School, Thornton Heath
- St John's CE Primary School, Shirley
- St Joseph's RC Infant School, Upper Norwood
- St Joseph's RC Junior School, Upper Norwood
- St Mark's CE Primary Academy, South Norwood
- St Mary's RC Infant School, Croydon
- St Mary's RC Junior School, Croydon
- St Peter's Primary School, South Croydon
- St Thomas Becket RC Primary School, Woodside
- Selsdon Primary and Nursery School, South Croydon
- Smitham Primary School, Coulsdon
- South Norwood Primary School, South Norwood
- Tudor Academy, New Addington
- West Thornton Primary School, Croydon
- Whitehorse Manor Infant School, Thornton Heath
- Whitehorse Manor Junior School, Thornton Heath
- Winterbourne Boys' Academy, Thornton Heath
- Winterbourne Junior Girls' School, Thornton Heath
- Winterbourne Nursery and Infants' School, Thornton Heath
- Woodcote Primary School, Coulsdon
- Woodside Primary School, Woodside

=== Secondary schools ===
- The Archbishop Lanfranc Academy, Thornton Heath
- Archbishop Tenison's School
- Ark Blake Academy, Croydon
- BRIT School, Selhurst
- Coloma Convent Girls' School, Shirley
- Coombe Wood School, Croydon
- Harris Academy Beulah Hill, Upper Norwood Beulah Hill
- Harris Academy Purley, Purley Purley
- Harris Academy South Norwood, South Norwood South Norwood
- Harris City Academy Crystal Palace, South Norwood Croydon
- Harris Invictus Academy Croydon Croydon
- The John Fisher School, Purley*
- Meridian High School, New Addington
- Norbury High School for Girls, Thornton Heath
- Oasis Academy Arena, South Norwood
- Oasis Academy Coulsdon, Coulsdon
- Oasis Academy Shirley Park, Ashburton
- Orchard Park High School, Shirley
- The Quest Academy, South Croydon
- Riddlesdown Collegiate, Purley
- St Joseph's College, Upper Norwood
- St Mary's RC High School, Croydon
- Shirley High School, Shirley
- Thomas More RC School, Purley
- Woodcote High School, Coulsdon

*This school is located in Croydon, but is administered by Sutton

=== Special and alternative schools ===
- Addington Valley Academy, New Addington
- Beckmead College, Monks Orchard
- Beckmead Park Academy, Beckenham*
- Bensham Manor School, Thornton Heath
- Chaffinch Brook School, Croydon
- Harris Aspire Academy, South Norwood
- Priory School, South Norwood
- Red Gates School, Purley Way
- St Giles School, South Croydon
- St Nicholas School, Purley
- Saffron Valley Collegiate, Croydon

*This school is located in Bromley, but is for pupils from Croydon

=== Further education ===
- Coulsdon Sixth Form College, Old Coulsdon
- Croydon College, Croydon
- John Ruskin College, Addington
- Harris Federation * Croydon
- Harris Academy * Custom House

== Independent schools ==
=== Primary and preparatory schools ===
- Cumnor House School, South Croydon
- Elmhurst School, South Croydon
- Laleham Lea School, Purley
- St David's School, Purley

=== Senior and all-through schools ===
- Al-Khair School, East Croydon
- Cambridge Tutors College, South Croydon
- The Cedars School, Upper Norwood
- Croydon High School, Selsdon
- Croydon Metropolitan College, Croydon
- The Laurels School, Upper Norwood
- The New School, Upper Norwood
- Old Palace School of John Whitgift, Croydon
- OneSchool Global UK, Kenley
- Royal Russell School, Croydon
- Trinity School of John Whitgift, Shirley
- Whitgift School, South Croydon

=== Special and alternative schools ===
- Abingdon House School, Purley
- Arise Academy, Croydon
- Aspire Learning, Croydon
- AYA College, Selhurst
- Bright Minds Creative Academy, Croydon
- CACFO Education Centre, Thornton Heath
- Olympus, South Croydon
- Rutherford School, South Croydon
- Serenity School, Croydon
- The Write Time, Croydon
