= Coombe, Croydon =

Area of London, England

Coombe
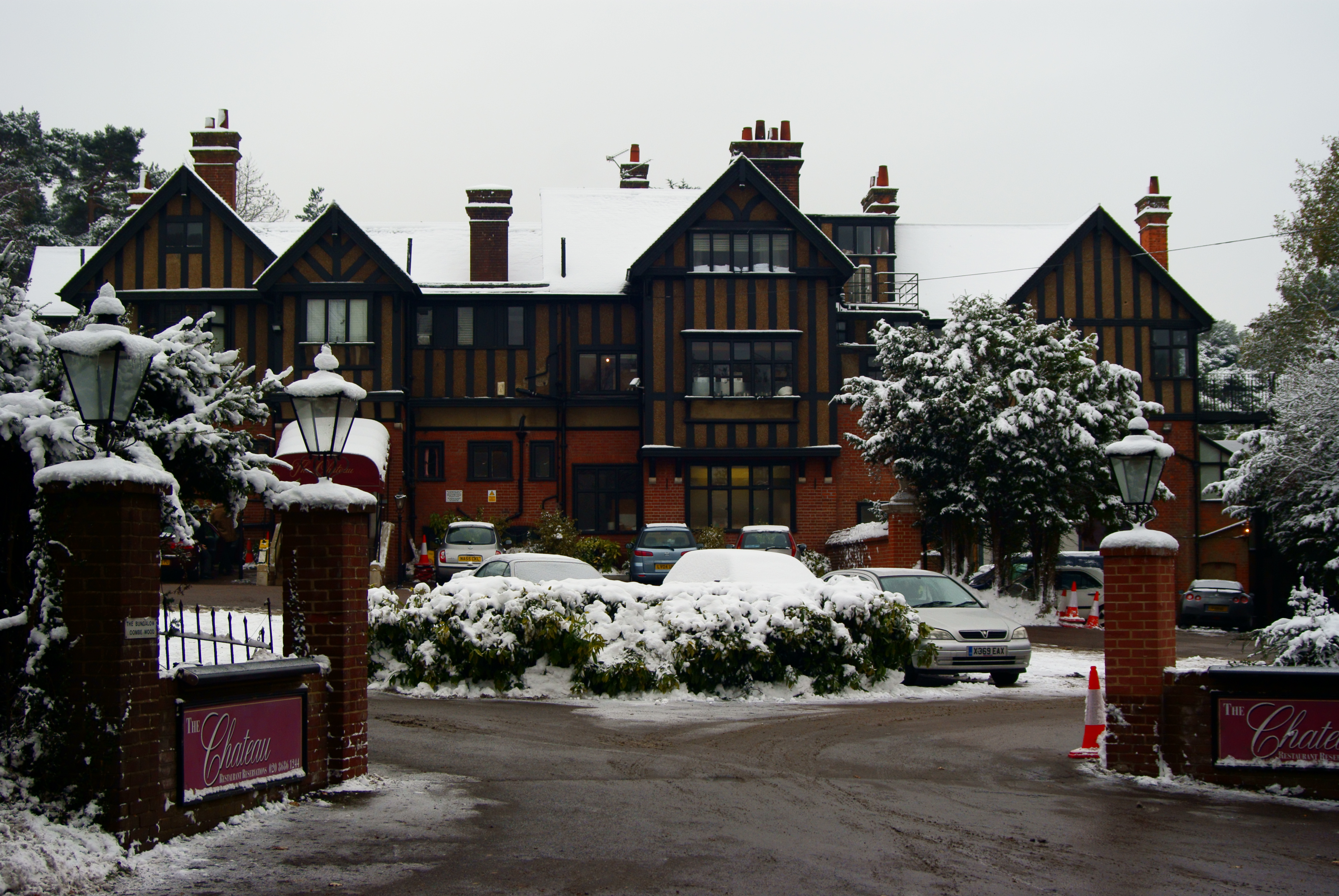
- Coombe Wood House

- Location within Greater London
- OS grid reference: TQ342647
- London borough: Croydon
- Ceremonial county: Greater London
- Region: London
- Country: England
- Sovereign state: United Kingdom
- Post town: CROYDON
- Postcode district: CR0
- Dialling code: 020
- Police: Metropolitan
- Fire: London
- Ambulance: London
- UK Parliament: Croydon South and Croydon East
- London Assembly: Croydon and Sutton

Coombe is a place in the London Borough of Croydon, situated south-east of central Croydon, between Addiscombe, Selsdon and Upper Shirley. Formerly a hamlet, since the growth of suburban development the area has become swallowed into the London conurbation and often does not appear on modern map.

Coombe is located between the green spaces of Addington Hills, Lloyd Park, Ballards and Coombe Wood. It is unusual in this part of South London as it has barely been urbanised and has retained its collection of large houses fairly intact. Its rural character is maintained by the woodland aspect of the road and an old cattle trough at the junction of Coombe Lane and Oaks Road. Tramlink, however, runs through Coombe. Coombe Lane, the continuation of Coombe Road, is the principal road. Conduit Lane is an ancient unpaved route that is now a woodland path.

There was an estate at Coombe as far back as 1221, recorded as being held by Richard of Coombe. The name comes from the Old English 'cumb', meaning a valley. In Elizabethan times, it was known as Broad Coombe. In the 17th century, it was owned by the brothers of William Harvey, who first described the circulation of blood.

== Early history ==
In 1722, "Some Persons, digging at a Village call'd Coomb, near Croydon in Surry, found a great Number of Roman Urns, and other Antique Curiosities" (sic). The nearby town of Croydon originally developed due to a Roman road, and part of a Roman road has been found in Lower Coombe Street, Croydon.

== The houses of Coombe ==
Coombe House, to the north of the road (51°21′49″N 0°4′17″W), dates back to 1761 and is Grade II listed. It is on the site of an older house, the Harveys' home. William Harvey stayed at the house frequently and had tunnels dug in the grounds in order to meditate in the dark. A 145 ft-deep well in the grounds of the house was said to be used by pilgrims to Canterbury on their journey to join the Pilgrims' Way, having come via the Archbishop's Croydon Palace. A Grade II listed brick icehouse is also in the grounds. Substantial changes were made to the house in the 1830s. It was bought in the 1890s by Frank Lloyd, a newspaper magnate. His father Edward Lloyd founded Lloyd Weekly Newspaper, later known as The Sunday News, and also the Daily Chronicle. He lived in Coombe House for 35 years until his death in 1927. Neighbouring Lloyd Park, created from land bequeathed by Lloyd, is named after him. The house was owned by an NHS Trust and was called Geoffrey Harris House. It is now owned by PACT Educational Trust and, in September 2013 reopened as The Cedars School, an independent all-boys senior school with a Catholic ethos. However the school relocated to Upper Norwood in September 2021. It was then occupied by Oakwood Prep School, also part of PACT Educational Trust. This closed in August 2023 as a result of an amalgamation. The site was sold to Spaghetti Bridge in March 2025 and is undergoing extensive renovation works, with the aim of re-opening as a special educational needs school.

Coombe Lodge Coombe Lodge is a Grade II Listed Georgian red brick mansion built by the 1760s. (51°21′44.5″N 0°4′16.9″W) Until around the 1890s, it was called Coombe Gate House. The Coombe estate was split and reunited several times, in 1761, Coombe Lodge joined with Coombe House and Coombe Farm. The original building was extended many times throughout the years, including a large iron and glass conservatory that was added in the late 19th century and is still there in the present day. After World War II the estate was bought by the County Borough of Croydon, which used the house as a home for the elderly. The Council's Parks Department built the Central Nursery in the grounds, and until recently, continued to be used for growing Croydon's plants and making Croypost, the municipal compost. The part of the grounds where Coombe Lodge is situated was sold in 1988 and converted into a large restaurant and bar, with a sizeable garden and 2 conservatories.

Coombe Wood House (51°21′43.5″N 0°4′3.5″W) was built in 1898 for Arthur Lloyd, brother of Frank Lloyd. Some years later, then-owner William Cash sold the house to Croydon Corporation, which used the house as a convalescent and children's home. It became the renowned ‘Chateau Napoleon’ restaurant and function venue. This closed in late 2022 as a result of rising costs and the Pandemic. In April 2025, the restaurant reopened as Coombe Wood House Restaurant, which aims to bring fine dining to this part of South Croydon. The ornamental gardens and 14 acres (57,000 m^{2}) of woodland were kept by the Council and opened to the public in 1948.

Coombe Farm is a large farmhouse off Oaks Road, reached via Oaks Lane. Oaks Lane was the former main road, closed by John Maberly of Shirley House in 1803 to increase his privacy. Oaks Road was its replacement. Oaks Lane is a road used by residents in Coombe and turns into a track for walkers beyond a disused quarry Scout camp, running past Oaks Farm and through the Shirley Park golf course to the Upper Shirley Road. The main Coombe Farm building dates from the 16th century, with 19th-century additions. Croydon local studies library archives show that the oldest part of the standing Coombe Farm farmhouse first stood on the site in the late 16th century. There is within the building an inscription on an oak beam with the date 1642. The farmhouse is clearly visible in John Rocque's 1745 plan of London and appears in the first Ordnance Survey plan published in 1882. Historic sources indicate that much of the current fabric (behind the Tudor frontage) are Victorian additions dating from 1844 and 1893. In 1893, another brother of Frank Lloyd, Herbert, built a much larger new building with mock-Tudor features beside the original building. Although most of the 'outbuildings' (some attached to the substantive building, some not) are likely to post-date those extensions in appearance they are late Victorian/Edwardian. This is with the exception of 1960s bungalows on the site. It is notable that throughout the cartographic record that the boundary of the 'farmyard' has remained fairly constant throughout. The farm is now a location for residences, the AlFatihah mosque and an office.

== Towards Croydon ==
Between Lloyd Park and central Croydon, considerable amounts of 20th-century housing was built, particularly in Park Hill. There were estates here too, with two houses surviving a mile from Coombe itself.

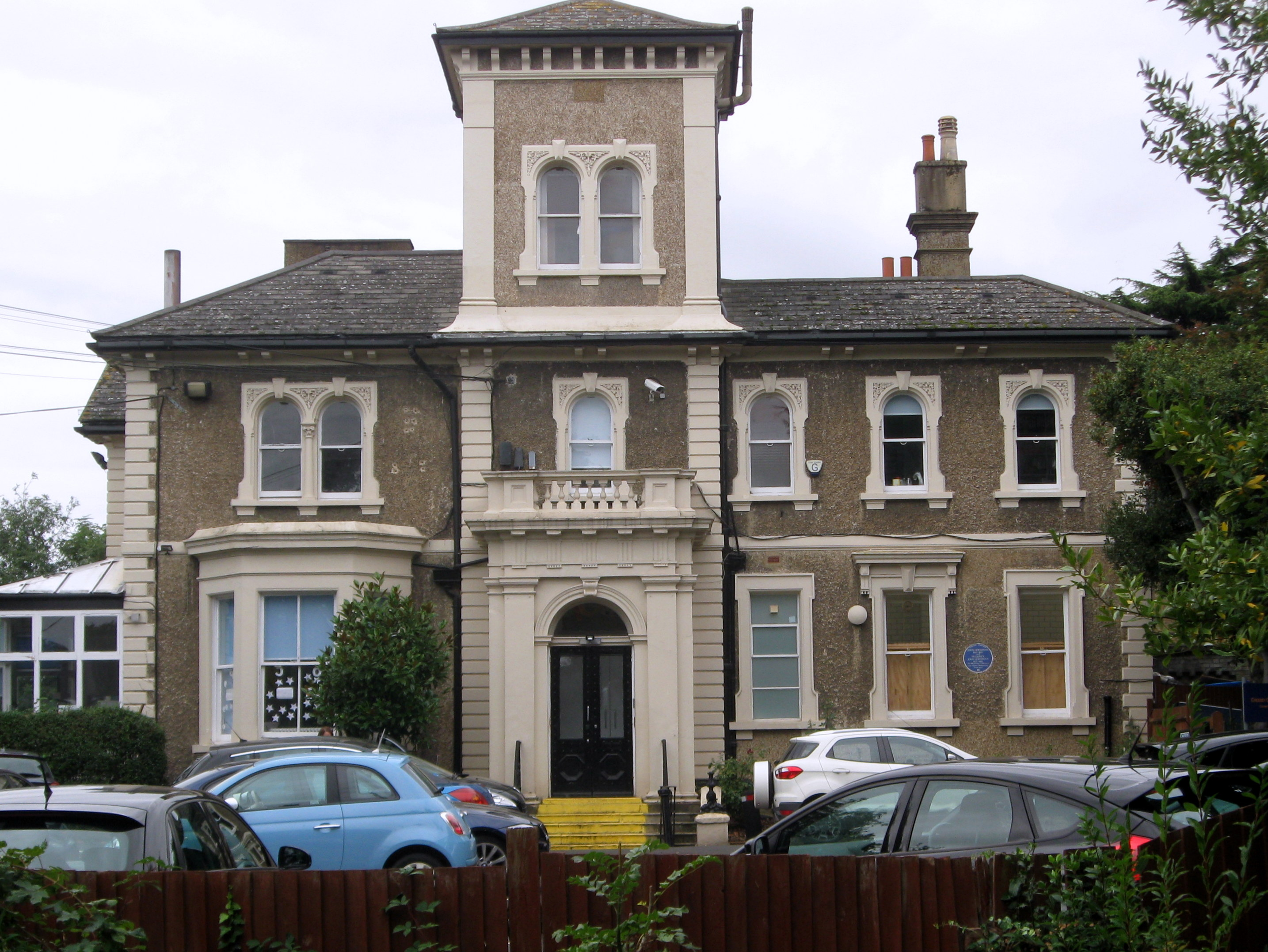
Coombe Cliff House

Coombe Cliff on Coombe Road was the home of the Horniman family of tea merchants. John Horniman (1803–1893) and Frederick John Horniman (1835–1906) are known as public benefactors and politicians. Frederick is remembered as the founder of the Horniman Museum. In 1850 John Horniman bought a piece of land known as The Warren and in 1853 he employed the Brown building firm to build a house on the site for him. Coombe Cliff had an important example of a Victorian conservatory with fine ironwork, used for Horniman's plant collection. Its glasswork created a shimmering effect in sunlight. Originally erected in 1894 as a 'lean-to' conservatory, and derelict by 1982, it was dismantled, refurbished and reconstructed as a free-standing conservatory adjacent to the Horniman Museum (in Forest Hill, London) in 1987, where it is in use for recitals, receptions etc.

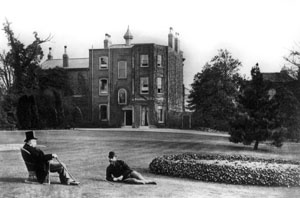
Baron Heath at Coombe Hill House

In 1930 Croydon Corporation purchased the house and gardens for a convalescent home for children, and it had several other uses before finally being used as an adult education centre in 1960. Coombe Cliff's gardens were merged into neighbouring Park Hill and opened to the public.

Coombe Hill House is a red-brick townhouse on Coombe Road, now considered central Croydon but until the 20th century in a rural setting. It was built around 1713 and is attributed to Sir Christopher Wren, although this is likely to be estate agent hype. It was expanded by Robert Amadeus Heath, 2nd Baron Heath, Italian Consul General, in the 19th century before becoming a boys' preparatory school. In 1966 it was bought by Croydon's labour, trade union and co-operative movement and developed into their headquarters, Ruskin House. It retains its sash windows, brick wall and large cedar tree.

== Towards Addington ==
The Ballards estate was a major landholding to the east of Coombe. Until the Reformation it was Prior Ballards, and then passed to the Leigh family of Addington. In 1872, Charles Hermann Goschen, Lord Lieutenant of the City of London and brother of the prominent politician George Joachim Goschen, 1st Viscount Goschen, bought the estate and built a new mansion, demolishing the old building. In the 1920s, the estate was donated to the trustees of the Warehousemen, Drapers, and Haberdashers, School. The new school, built to the side of the mansion, was designed by Sir Aston Webb, architect of Imperial College. The school is now known as Royal Russell School.

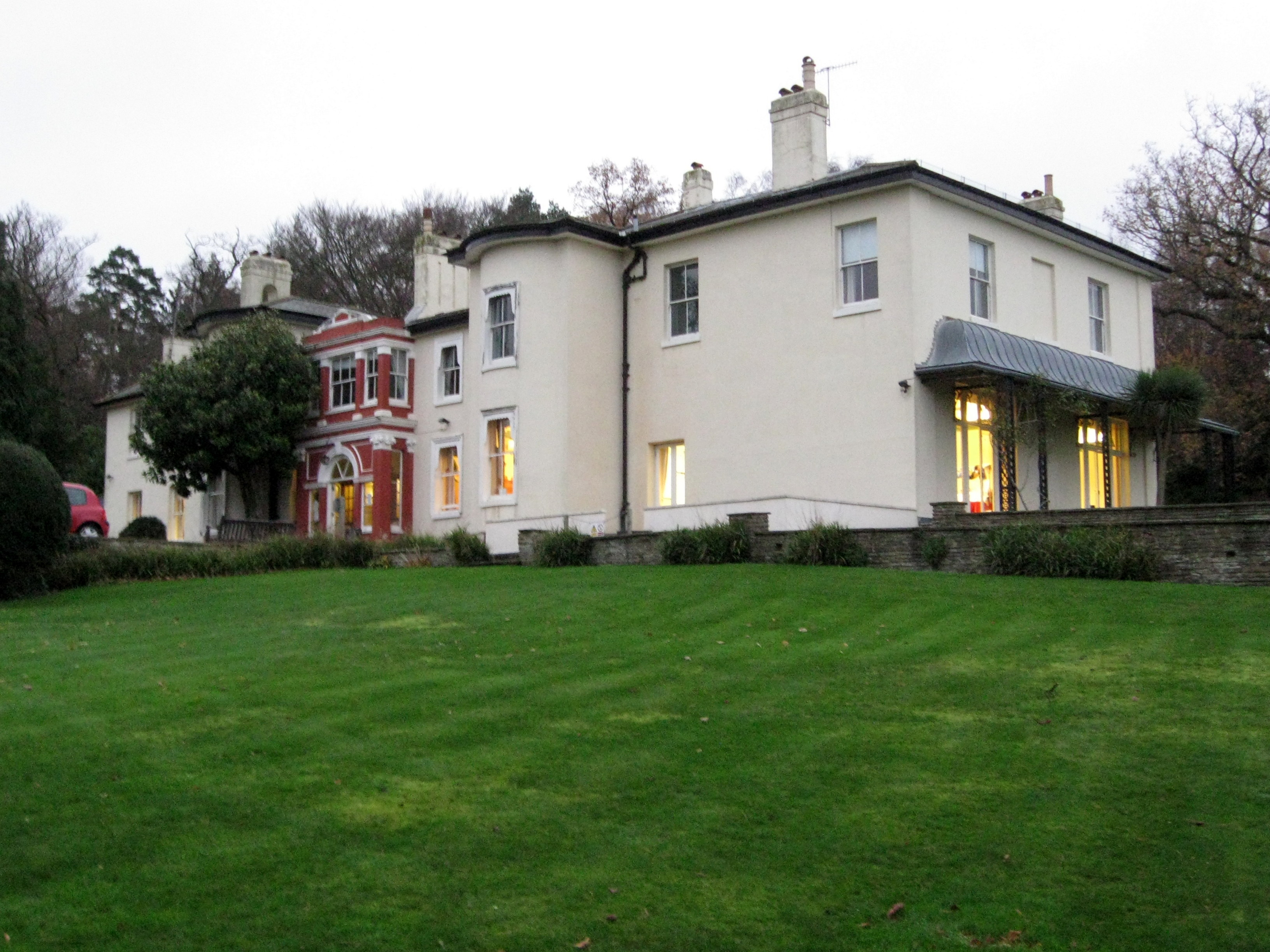
Heathfield House, in December 2015

Heathfield House (18 acres (7.3 ha)) was also bought by Goschen in 1872, who rebuilt the former farmhouse and leased it to his brother Henry, one of the last serving members of the East India Company. The house was sold in 1919 to Howard Houlder a former mayor of Croydon and a member of the Houlder Line shipping family. The property was sold a short time later to a Mr. Costain. In 1937, Raymond Riesco bought the property, creating banks of rhododendrons and a walled garden. Riesco arranged for the house, gardens and farmland to be bought by Croydon Council upon his death and donated his collection of oriental ceramics. The house is now the Council's training centre, with the gardens open to the public. The farm is still cultivated, with part used as horse pasture and the Monks Hill estate built on the eastern end. Part of the grounds are also home to the Croydon Ecology Centre since 1997, when an American Oak tree was planted in memory of Henry Jackson of RSPB Croydon Local Group. The house is Grade II listed.

== Public transport ==
With the introduction of Croydon Tramlink the 353 bus route that served Coombe was discontinued beyond Addington Village Interchange leaving Coombe with improved privacy but modest public transport links with tramstops some distance from Coombe. The nearest are Coombe Lane tram stop and Lloyd Park tram stop. The area's train station - Coombe Road railway station - closed in 1983.

== Coombe Wood School ==
In 2018, Coombe Wood School opened on the former playing fields at the junction of Melville Avenue and Coombe Road (close to Lloyd Park). Initially in a temporary structure, construction began on a permanent facility in 2019, expected to open in September 2020.

== See also ==
- Lloyd Park (Croydon)
- Coombe Wood
