= Coombe Wood =

Woodland and garden area in London, England

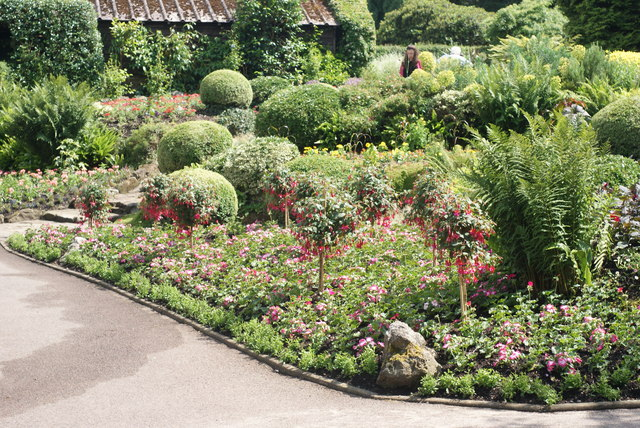
- Flower Border in Coombe Wood Gardens

- Location within Greater London
- Interactive map of Coombe Wood
- Location: Coombe, South Croydon
- Coordinates: 51.361°N 0.067°W
- Area: area = 14.25 acres (5.77 ha)
- Status: Open year round
- Public transit: Tramlink route 3 to Lloyd Park or Coombe Lane tram stops

Coombe Wood is a small (14.25 acres (5.77 ha)) woodland and garden area in the old village of Coombe, South Croydon near the junction of Coombe Lane and Conduit Lane. The Coombe Wood Gardens are divided into a series of rooms which together give an all-year-round display of shrubs and plants set against a woodland backdrop.

== History ==
More than four hundred years ago, the area was open land and part of an estate (of Coombe House) with a large common field known as Coombe Field which lay between Coombe Road and Park Hill.

The land became the property of James Bourdieu Senior (of Coombe House) in 1801, at the time of the Enclosures of Common Land Act. Bourdieu already owned The Coombe Estate, including Coombe Lodge, House and Farm which amounted to approximately 251 acres (102 ha) altogether. Coombe Wood supplied water to the Coombe estate, via three conduits which ran along the adjacent lane leading to the name 'Conduit Lane'.

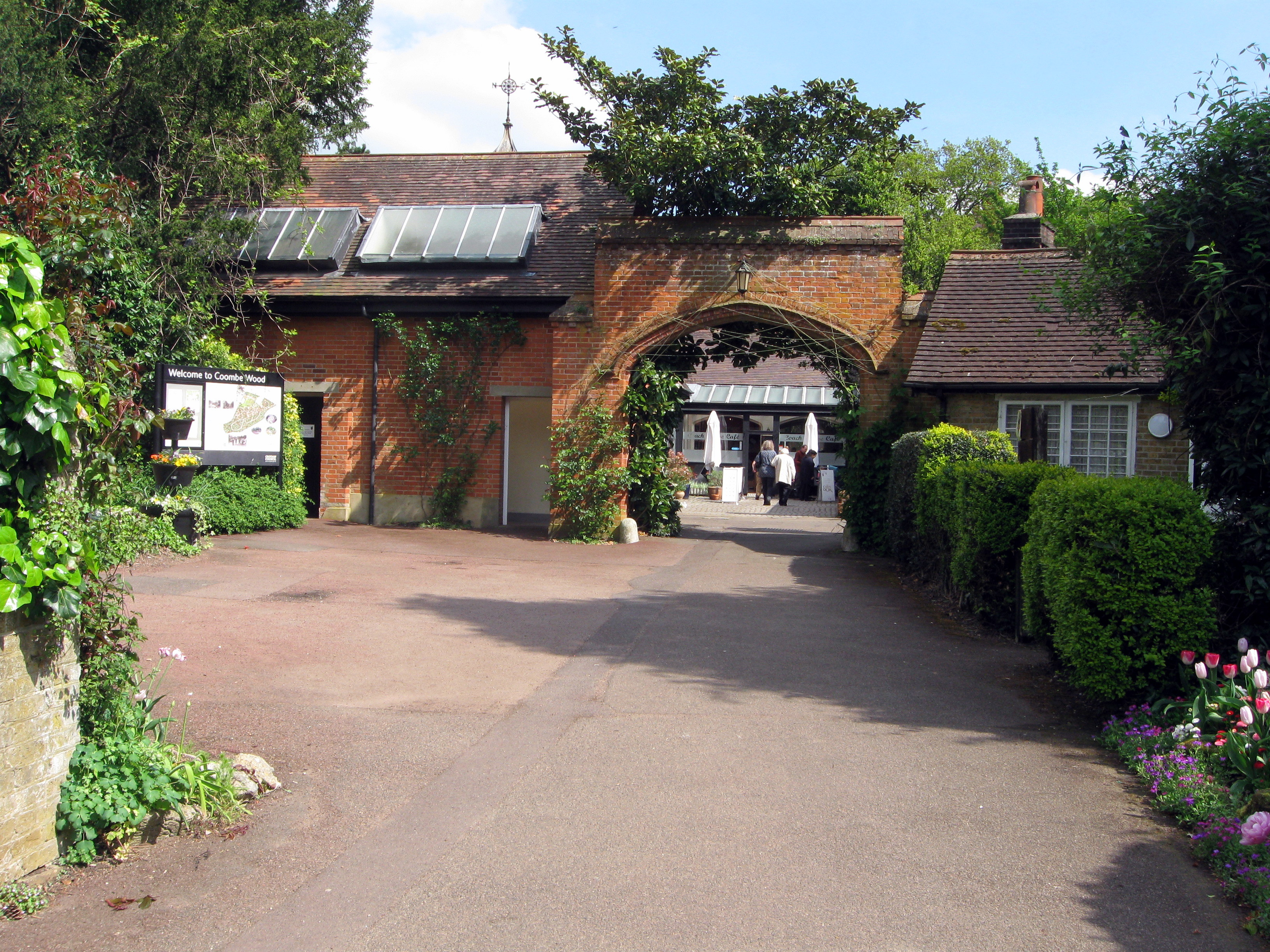
The former stable block with the Coach House cafe visible through the arch

In 1898, Arthur Lloyd, brother of Frank Lloyd built Coombe Wood House.

The estate of Coombe Wood House was later purchased for £14,000, with Coombe Wood, by Croydon Council, from Mr. W Cash (who was the Chairman of the Croydon Gas Company), for the use of the public of Croydon. The house was used as a convalescent and children's home. The 14.25 acres of parkland were opened to the public in 1948. There is a café in the old stable block.

== Access ==
It is served by Tramlink stops at Coombe Lane and Lloyd Park. The Vanguard Way (long-distance footpath) also passes by the woods and garden.

Note: There are many other Coombe Woods all over the United Kingdom (including Benfleet, Essex).

== See also ==
- List of Parks and Open Spaces in Croydon
- Addington Hills
- Addington Park
- Lloyd Park
- Coombe, Croydon
