= The Laurels School =

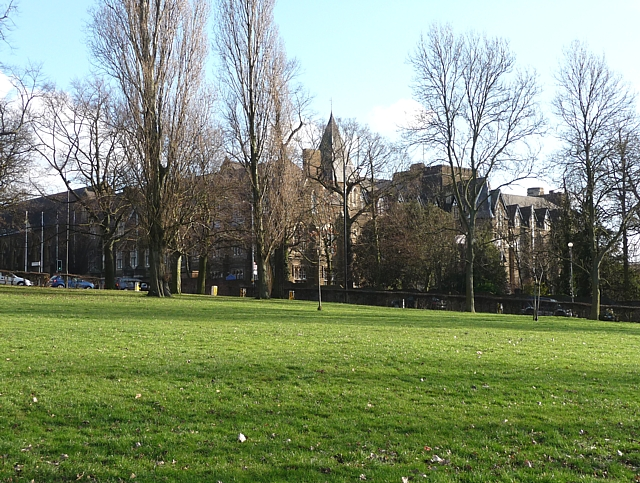

Location
- 1 Our Lady’s Close; Upper Norwood; Croydon, Greater London, SE19 3FA; England

Information
- Type: Private school
- Religious affiliation: Roman Catholic
- Established: 2013
- Department for Education URN: 140356 Tables
- Ofsted: Reports
- Headmistress: Linda Sanders
- Gender: Girls
- Age: 11 to 18
- Website: thelaurelsschool.org.uk

The Laurels School was an 11–18 girls Roman Catholic private day school and sixth form. Established in 2013 by the PACT Educational Trust, it was based in the Upper Norwood area of the London Borough of Croydon in England.

The school relocated in September 2021 to the former location of Virgo Fidelis Convent Senior School, a Roman Catholic voluntary aided secondary school for girls. This space was shared with The Cedars School for boys.

In common with the neighbouring boys school and other members of the PACT Educational Trust, the ethos of The Laurels School was reportedly inspired by the teachings of St Josemaría Escrivá and the organisation he founded, Opus Dei.

== History ==
The original building on the site was a hunting lodge (of unknown age). In the late 1700s, the building was owned by the Earls of Bristol, and was known as Norwood House, the residence of the notable socialite Mary Nesbitt. In the early 1800s the lodge was sold and became known as the "Old Park Hotel".

=== Virgo Fidelis Convent Senior School ===
Mother Saint Mary (Henriette le Forestier d'Osseville; 1803–1858), who had arrived in the United Kingdom in September 1848 with the intention of establishing a school under the patronage of Cardinal Wiseman, acquired the site with funds provided by her father, Count Theodose le Forestier d'Osseville in 1857. The current building was designed by William Wardell and built in phases in the gothic style to accommodate Virgo Fidelis Convent Senior School commencing at that time. The convent is part of the Sisters of Our Lady of Fidelity, an international Roman Catholic religious organisation, founded in France in 1831.

Due to financial pressures and lack of funds for building repairs, Virgo Fidelis Convent Senior School closed at the end of the 2021 Summer term.

=== The Laurels School ===
The Laurels School was established in 2013 in Clapham Park. In 2015 the school was visited by Lord and Lady Windsor, both of whom are supporters of the PACT Educational Trust.

The school relocated to Shelley House on Chelsea Embankment in 2019. Shelley House had been used by the Opus Dei Catholic institution since 1978 for the education of women. The school rapidly outgrew this site and relocated to the former Virgo Fidelis Convent Senior School in September 2021.

== Profile ==
The Laurels School is academically selective, and also operates a small sixth form. The site is shared with The Cedars School for boys, and both schools use the same sports hall.

The school environment reflects a strongly Catholic ethos; a prayer is said at the beginning of every lesson, and alongside a mainstream academic curriculum, girls attend talks on motherhood and family life.

== Notable former pupils ==
=== Virgo Fidelis Convent Senior School ===
- Maura McGowan (b. 1957) - High Court judge
