= Addington Hills =

Park in Upper Shirley, London, England

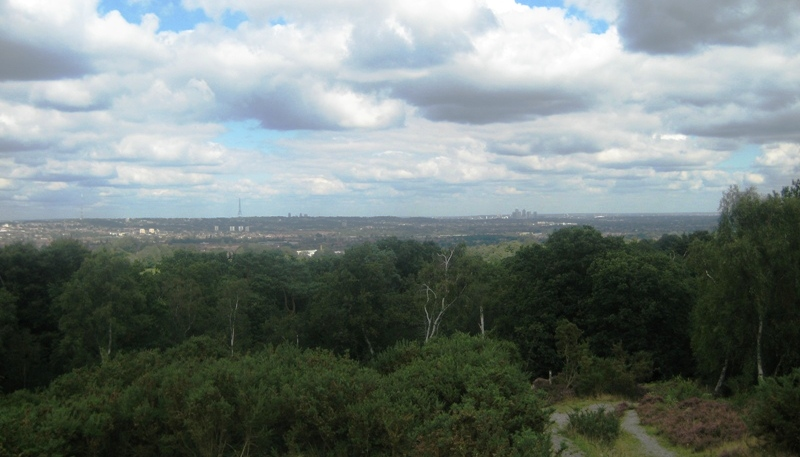
- View from Addington Hills viewpoint

- Location within Greater London
- Type: Public park
- Location: Shirley
- Coordinates: 51.363°N 0.058°W
- Area: 130 acres (53 ha)
- Operator: London Borough of Croydon
- Open: All year
- Public transit: Tramlink to Coombe Lane tram stop

Addington Hills (also referred to as Shirley Hills) is a park in Upper Shirley, London, England. It is managed by the London Borough of Croydon. It was part of the old parish of Addington before the suburb of Shirley was developed in the 1930s. The site consists largely of woodland on a gravel bed, with London's largest area of heathland at its heart. It is a Site of Metropolitan Importance. In the mid-18th century, it was a noted cricket venue used by the then-prominent Addington Cricket Club.

Addington Hills and Croham Hurst, a short distance to the southwest, form popular open spaces in Croydon. It is a peaceful area with many pathways, close to central Croydon. There is a viewpoint with fine views across Croydon and across to north London, including Docklands and Parliament Hill. It is served by Coombe Lane tram stop on the London Tramlink route to New Addington which runs along the southern edge of the land. The park covers an area of 130 acres (53 ha). The London Loop path runs through the park. The park is fully accessible at all times.

== Description ==
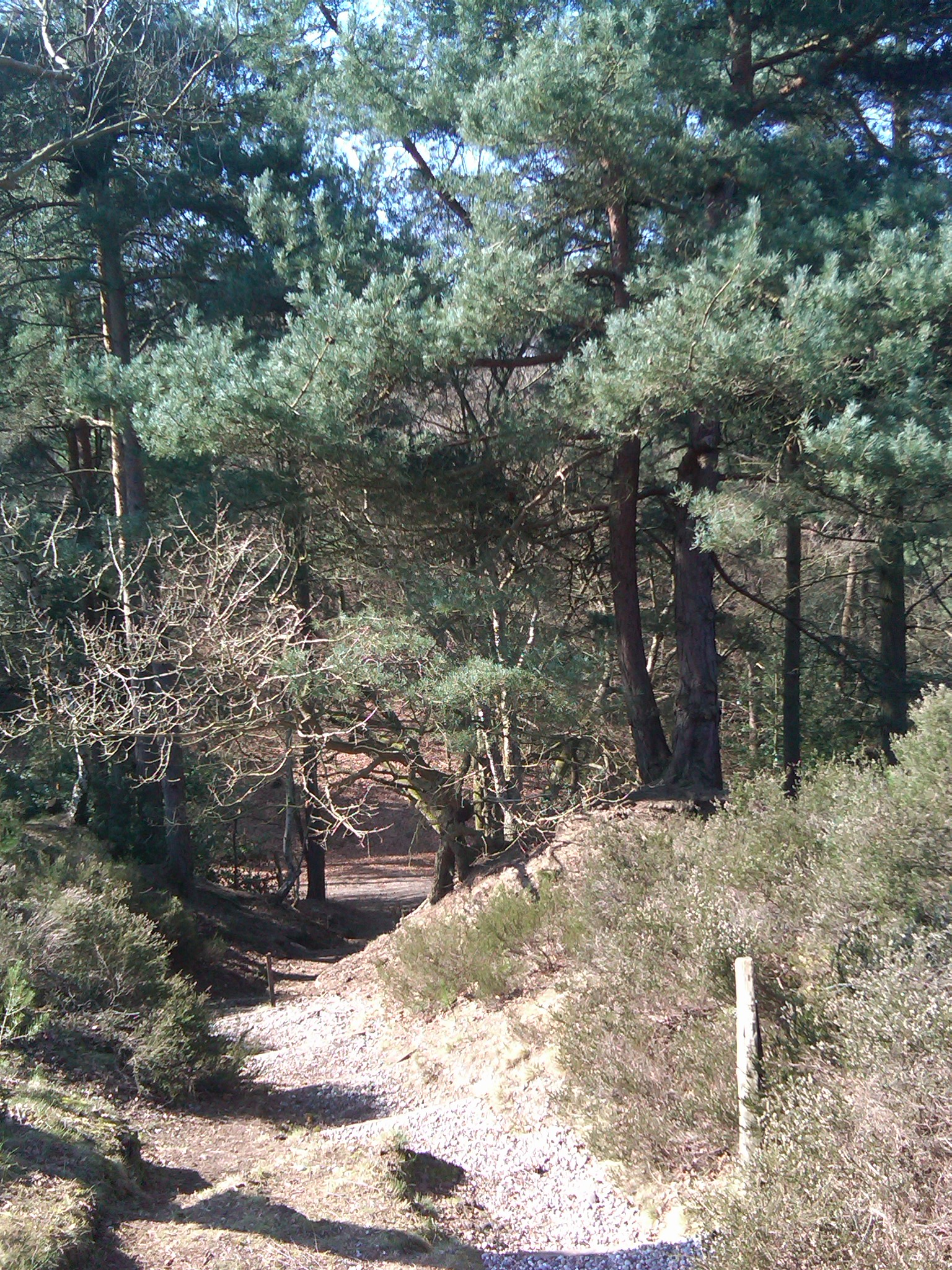
A path across Addington Hills

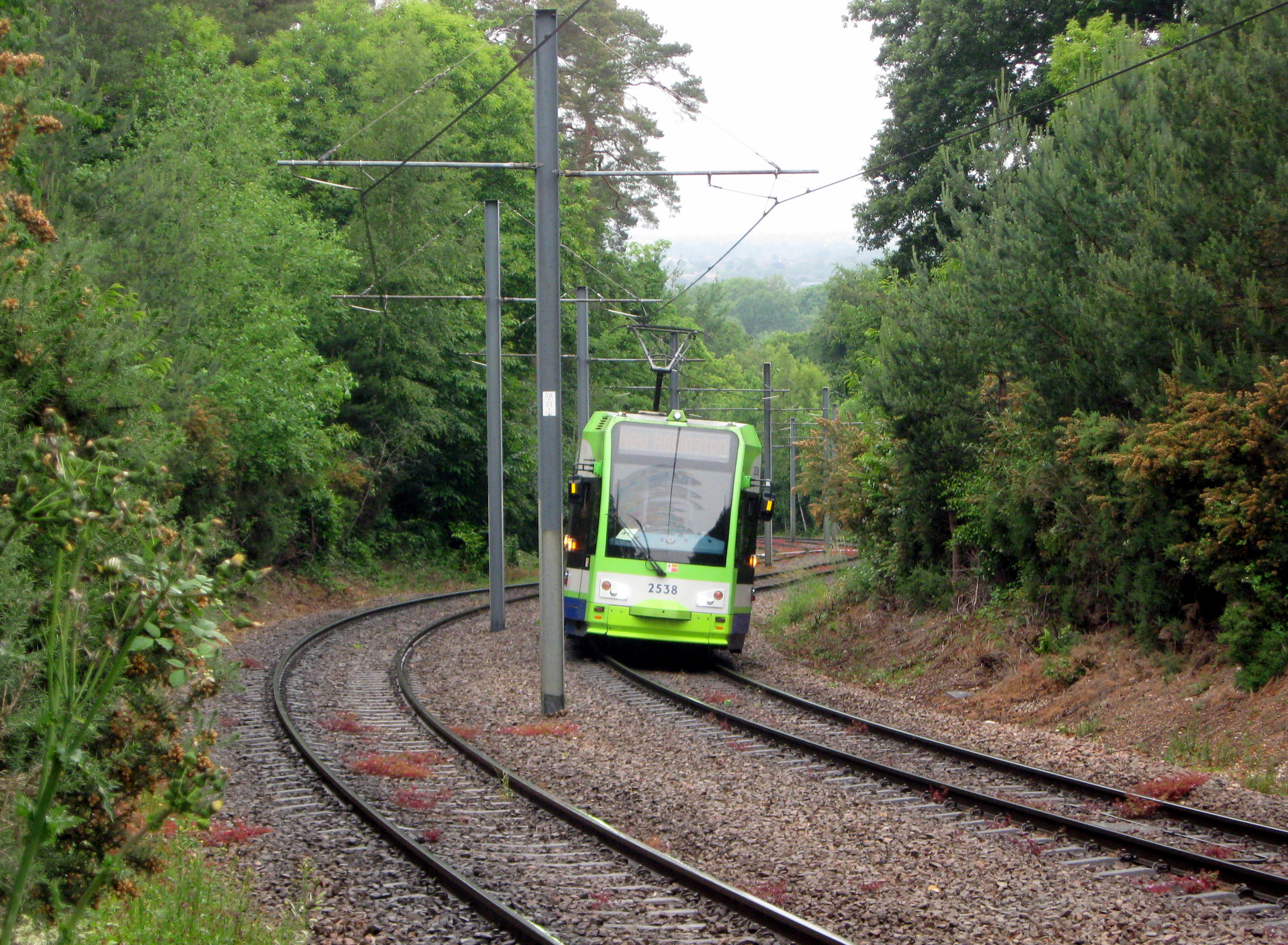
Tramlink tram no 2538 eastbound, climbs towards the Coombe Lane tram stop

Addington Hills reaches 460 feet (140 m) above sea level. The terrain drops sharply to the north, exposing the hills' pebbly composition at the end of the gullies. Addington Hills borders Coombe Park / Lloyd Park on its west and Coombe Wood on its south.

The area was originally called the hill of Pripledeane or Prible Dean, a name meaning "Gravel Valley" that came from the Middle English words prebel ("gravel") and dene ("valley"). The land was acquired by Croydon Board of Health in four parts over a 45-year period.

== Facilities ==
Addington Hills facilities include:

- Car parking – off Shirley Hills Road and Oaks Road, at the junction with Coombe Lane
- London Loop path
- Chinese restaurant
- Takeaway coffee
- Horse rides
- Viewpoint

=== Cricket venue ===
The first definite mention of Addington Hills in a cricket connection is a 1745 match there on Thursday, 23 May between Addington and London. Little about the match is known except that Addington won. The venue was used for matches on at least four occasions between 1745 and 1752, a period which coincided with Addington Cricket Club having one of the strongest teams in England. The last match known to have been played there was Addington v Dartford on 12 August 1752.

== Wildlife ==
The heathland areas are dominated by heather and gorse, with some bilberry and goldenrod. Drier spots are indicated by the occurrence of bell heather. Fine-leaved fescues, wavy hair-grass and purple moor-grass dominate the acid grassland areas with a mix of wood sage, heath bedstraw and other typical species. Marsh violet and hard fern (both London rarities) occur in the damper areas.

Burrowing bees and wasps occur in the bare patches of soil and the bushy heathers and acid-loving grasses provide home to a wide range of insects, spiders and other invertebrates, each well adapted to the warm, dry conditions at ground level.

The invertebrate fauna plays an important part in supporting a range of birds and reptiles – and all benefit from the varied mosaic of open and scrubland habitats. In open areas, common lizards and slowworms thrive. Green woodpeckers may be seen in the woods and on the heath, and goldcrests among the woodland edges and in the gorse.

== Habitats ==
The northern area of woodland is by far the oldest, in particular the very old oak pollards near Oaks Road. Other wooded areas are comparatively recent, and the small pine plantations near the southern boundary were only established during the mid-19th century.

Until the 1920s, there were only a few scattered oak, pine and birch on the hills, which were then almost entirely covered in heather. Now there is far more extensive tree cover, and heather is limited to the slopes and ridges where it tolerates the harsh conditions provided by the very dry and acidic poor soil.

== See also ==
- List of Parks and Open Spaces in Croydon
- Ashburton Park
- Woodside Green
- Brickfields Meadow
- Addington Interchange
