= Missionary Fathers of Our Lady of Deliverance =

French religious congregation

The Missionary Fathers of Our Lady of Deliverance (French: Congrégation des missionnaires de Notre-Dame-de-la-Délivrande) is a former French religious congregation of men founded about 1820 to promote the Catholic faith in the region of Normandy in the aftermaths of the destruction to religious practice during the French Revolution.

== History ==
=== Foundation ===
In 1819, under the leadership of Louis Saulet (1796-1862), who had just been ordained a priest of the Diocese of Bayeux, a small group of priests and seminarians in the diocese saw the great challenge still existing in re-establishing the Catholic faith to a population devastated by the destruction of Church institutions during the French Revolution and the social disruption left in the wake of the Napoleonic era. Inspired by the model of the Society of Missionaries for France recently founded in Lyon, the group determined to form themselves into a religious congregation, subject to religious vows. They committed themselves to serve the diocese as missionaries to the local populace, working to revive their practice of the Catholic faith and deepen it through spiritual retreats.

Given the approval of the local bishop, Charles Brault, for this enterprise, in 1820 they acquired the chateau of Sommervieu, which became their motherhouse. The bishop soon charged the new community of priests to help in the pastoral care of pilgrims to the Basilica of Our Lady of Deliverance in Douvres, the major Marian shrine of Normandy, as the regular team of priests on staff at the shrine were overwhelmed by the large number of visitors. By 1824 the group was sufficiently established to elect a Superior General, to which office Saulet was elected as the first to serve in it.

Saulet became the confessor of a young nobleman, Henriette Le Forestier d'Osseville, who had felt a call to found a new religious of women to need the social needs of young women in the region. He gave her the advice and support needed to assist her in the establishment of the Sisters of Our Lady of Fidelity in 1831. The association between their congregations was to last throughout the history of the men's community.

Choosing to remain a congregation of diocesan right, the Missionaries remained a part of the diocese, under the authority of its bishop, and serving just within that diocese. While remaining stable, as a consequence they never grew in large numbers. By 1904, they numbered some 80 members, both priests and Religious Brothers, with twenty men in training for their way of life in their novitiate.

=== Dispersal and rebirth ===
In July 1904, the French government broke off relations with the Holy See, abrogating the nation's concordat with the Catholic Church. As a consequence of the resulting Law of Separation, the government banned the operation of all religious orders in the country and seized their properties. Many members of the religious orders went into exile in other countries, both in Europe and North America. This was the fate also of the Missionary Fathers, who lost their motherhouse in Sommervieu.

Relations between France and the Church were repaired in 1921, at which time many surviving members of French religious communities who had lived in exile returned to their homeland. Their communities began the process of rebuilding their lives in France, and many were able to recover their properties. The Missionary Fathers were not among them and, under the leadership of their Superior, Père Jeanne, they found new headquarters in Douvres-la-Délivrande.

Over the next century, the Missionaries gave their services to the now-named Diocese of Bayeux and Lisieux in various ways. Some taught at the diocesan minor seminary, while others served in local parishes or served as chaplains to communities of religious sisters in the region.

=== Ending ===
The numbers of the congregation dwindled during the century following their return to France. The last member of the congregation, Daniel Lécluse (1926-2016), served throughout his ministry at various times as a teacher and in parishes. He was buried in the plot of the congregation in the municipal cemetery, ending the history of the congregation.
