= Sisters of Our Lady of Fidelity =

The Congregation of Our Lady of Fidelity (French: Congrégation Notre-Dame de Fidelité) is a Catholic religious congregation of women founded in France in 1831 by Henriette Le Forestier d'Osseville, known in religion as Mother Saint Mary, which has as its primary goal the education of young women, especially orphans. They currently serve worldwide.

== History ==
=== Origins ===
D'Osseville, who was to become the foundress of the congregation, was born in 1803 in Rouen, Normandy, to Count Théodose Le Forestier d’Osseville, the Receiver general of Calvados, and his wife, Anne Renée de Valori, the daughter of the Seigneur of Montauban. She was the third of their three daughters. Two younger brothers did not survive infancy. Though wealthy, they were a deeply religious couple, and the count was later honored by the Catholic Church by being named a Knight of Malta. As a child Henriette had always expressed a deep devotion to the Virgin Mary. Her faith was tested and confirmed when one of her sisters was miraculously cured following a life-threatening illness. Subsequently, she and her father visited the most ancient Marian shrine in Normandy, the Basilica of Our Lady of the Deliverance (La Déliverande) in Douvres, to give thanks to God and the Blessed Virgin for this. Her father declared to her during that visit that, "I shall die happy only if a pious work is to remain at La Deliverande as a perpetual living ex-voto in gratitude for what I owe to God."

Inspired by these words, D'Osseville began to feel that she herself might provide the answer to her father's prayer through establishing some way of helping the hordes of children left impoverished and orphaned by the devastation of the nation in the aftermath of the Napoleonic Wars, a cause that had already struck her heart. She believed that she had a confirmation of this inspiration through a vision of the Virgin Mary on the feast of the Assumption of Mary, August 15, 1829. In her vision, she was guaranteed support in her efforts by the Blessed Mother. She soon set out to establish this work, with the support of her father, as well as that of Louis-Jacques-Tranquille Saulet, founder of the Missionary Fathers of Our Lady of Deliverance, a religious community of men dedicated to helping to restore the practice of the Catholic faith in that region, to whom she had confided her thoughts. This association between the two congregations was to endure for nearly two centuries.

D'Osseville was able to recruit a small group of women who felt called to join her in her project. Having gained the approval of Jean-Charles-Richard Dancel, the Bishop of Bayeux, in whose diocese the town is located, on February 26, 1831, the small community of women committed themselves as members of the new congregation, called the Sisters of Our Lady of Charity of the Orphans of Mary of the Deliverance, called the Faithful Virgin. They would keep this title as the official name of the congregation until 1969. The spirituality of the congregation is both Marian and Ignatian. They immediately began the construction of a convent to meet their needs. Built in the neoclassical style then popular, the Couvent Notre-Dame-de-Fidélité has become a noted landmark of the region. In the 1930s, its Chapel of the Faithful Virgin was decorated by the noted glassmaker, René Lalique.

=== Expansion ===
In 1848 the Great Famine of Ireland had created a large number of desperate orphans who needed care and schooling. Cardinal Nicholas Wiseman, the Archbishop of Westminster, requested the help of the congregation to assist in this disaster. Consequently, in September of that year D'Osseville set sail from France with 18 Sisters bound for England with the intention to establish an orphanage and school in Upper Norwood, a sheltered neighborhood of London. The Sisters were accompanied on this mission by their chaplain, Desiré-Michel Vesque. (He was later appointed as the Bishop of Roseau on the island of Dominica in the West Indies. He died there some eighteen months later, at the age of 40. His remains were buried in the cemetery of the Sisters' convent in England.) In 1857, the Sisters acquired an ancient estate house and soon established an orphanage and school in Upper Norwood, the first Catholic orphanage in England since the Dissolution of the Monasteries under Henry VIII. which they named St. Mary's Lodge.

In 1851 D'Osseville returned to the motherhouse in Douvres, where she assumed the position of Superior, though she insisted on living with the orphan girls who were cared for there. She remained there until her death in 1858.

The congregation received the Decretum laudis granting it the official approval of the Holy See in 1870. Their Constitutions, inspired by that of the Society of Jesus, were approved in 1904, establishing them fully as an approved religious institute in the Catholic Church. Since their founding, the Sisters have opened houses in Belgium, Italy and the United Kingdom.

=== Current status ===
Since 2015, the Sisters of the congregation have also been present in Africa, South Korea and India. As of 2017, they number 55 members in 11 houses of the congregation.

== Sources ==
- William E. Addis and Thomas Arnold, A Catholic Dictionary..., Kessinger Publishing, 2004, part 1, p. 347.
