= Charles Patteson =

English international hockey player, cricketer and clergyman

Personal information
- Full name: Charles Patteson
- Born: 11 November 1891; Upper Norwood, Surrey, England
- Died: 9 December 1957 (aged 66); Howden, Yorkshire, England
- Batting: Right-handed
- Bowling: Left-arm underarm

Domestic team information
- Years: Team
- 1912: Cambridge University
- 1920–1922: Wiltshire

Career statistics
Competition	First-class
Matches	5
Runs scored	157
Batting average	22.42
100s/50s	–/1
Top score	57
Balls bowled	60
Wickets	1
Bowling average	36.00
5 wickets in innings	–
10 wickets in match	–
Best bowling	1/12
Catches/stumpings	5/–
- Source: Cricinfo, 28 June 2019

Charles Patteson (11 November 1891 – 9 December 1957) was an English international hockey player, first-class cricketer and clergyman.

Patteson was born at Upper Norwood in November 1891. He was educated at Marlborough College, and returned as an assistant master when he served in the Marlborough College contingent of the Officers' Training Corps as a cadet officer. From there he went up to the University of Cambridge, where played five first-class cricket matches for Cambridge University in 1912. He scored 157 run in these five matches, at an average of 22.42 and a high score of 57. He also gained his Blue at hockey. After graduating from Cambridge he became a clergyman. Patteson played minor counties cricket for Wiltshire between 1920–22, making ten appearances in the Minor Counties Championship. He played international hockey in 1920, turning out for England against both Scotland and Ireland.

He married Isabel Mary Cornwall (daughter of Alan Cornwall) whose brother Alan Cornwall also taught at Marlborough. He held a curacy at St Mary's Lambeth and then became vicar of St Anne's, South Lambeth in 1927. Following those posts, he became Vicar of West Dulwich in 1931 and then Vicar of Scarborough in 1936. He subsequently became a Canon of York and chaplain of St Peter's School, York. Finally he became Vicar of Howden in 1956. He died on 9 December 1957 at Howden, Yorkshire.
