= Upper Norwood Library =

Public library in Upper Norwood, South London

Coordinates: 51.4198°N 0.0814°W

Upper Norwood Joint Library Hub
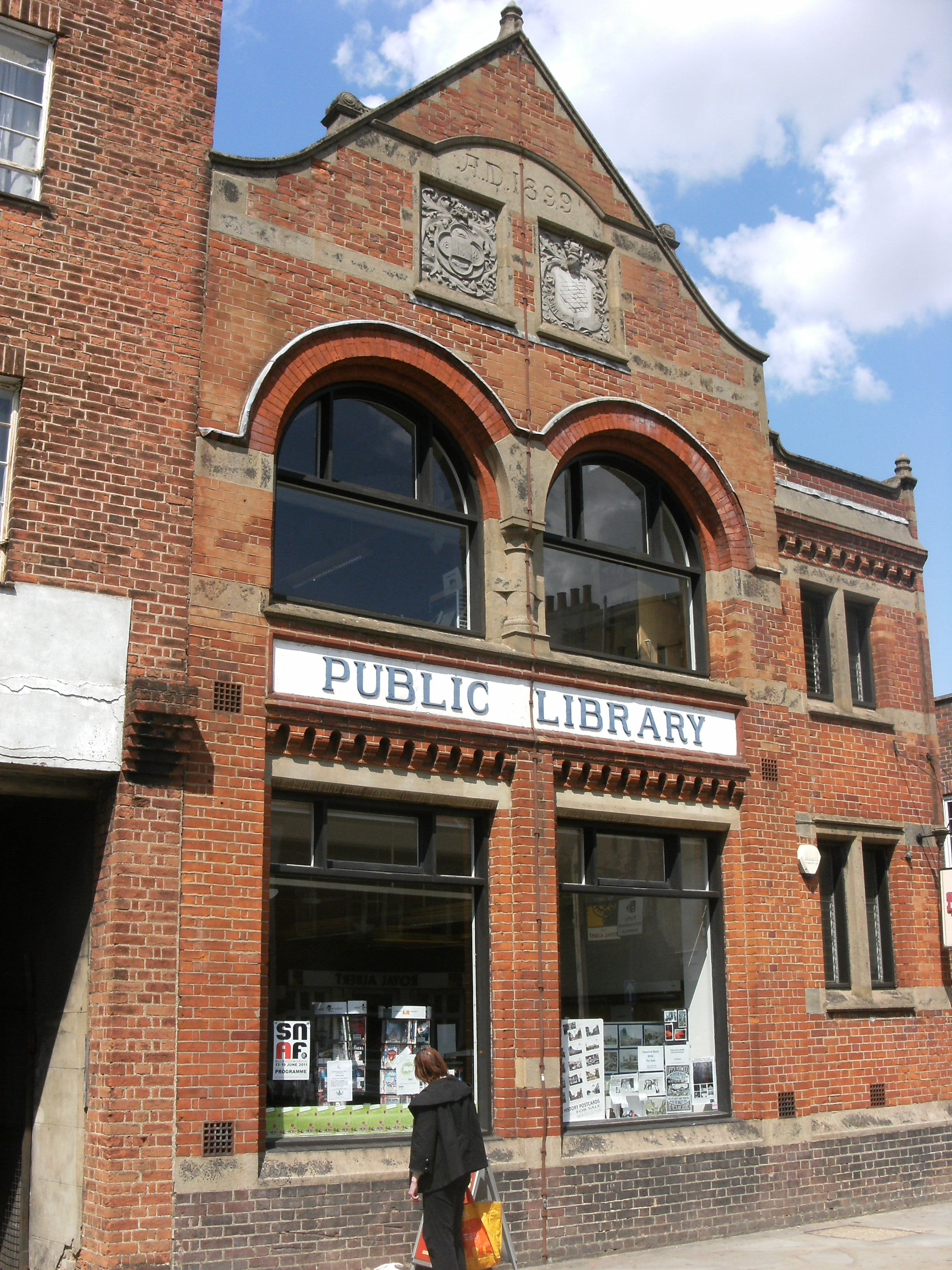
- Upper Norwood Library Hub
- Interactive map of the Upper Norwood Joint Library Hub area

General information
- Location: Crystal Palace, London, United Kingdom
- Client: London Borough of Croydon and London Borough of Lambeth

Website
- www.uppernorwoodlibraryhub.org

Upper Norwood Library is a community managed library in Upper Norwood, South London. It stands on Westow Hill, in Crystal Palace town centre, within the London Borough of Lambeth, but on the edge of the boundary with the London Borough of Croydon. It is funded largely by Lambeth Council, and in part by Croydon Council, with the building itself managed by a community-run independent charity, the Upper Norwood Library Trust. It is part of the Lambeth network of libraries, and thus accepts Lambeth library membership cards.

Onsite is one of the first Library of Things, a self-service borrowing initiative active across local communities which lends objects instead of books from a conventional library. These objects include anything from garden tools to sports gear, toys to electro-domestic equipment. The Upper Norwood Library Hub, the operations arm of the Upper Norwood Library Trust, manages the building itself, and runs various classes, workshops and initiatives within the space. The library also has space available for private hire through the Hub.
