= Arthur Lang =

English cricketer (1890–1915)

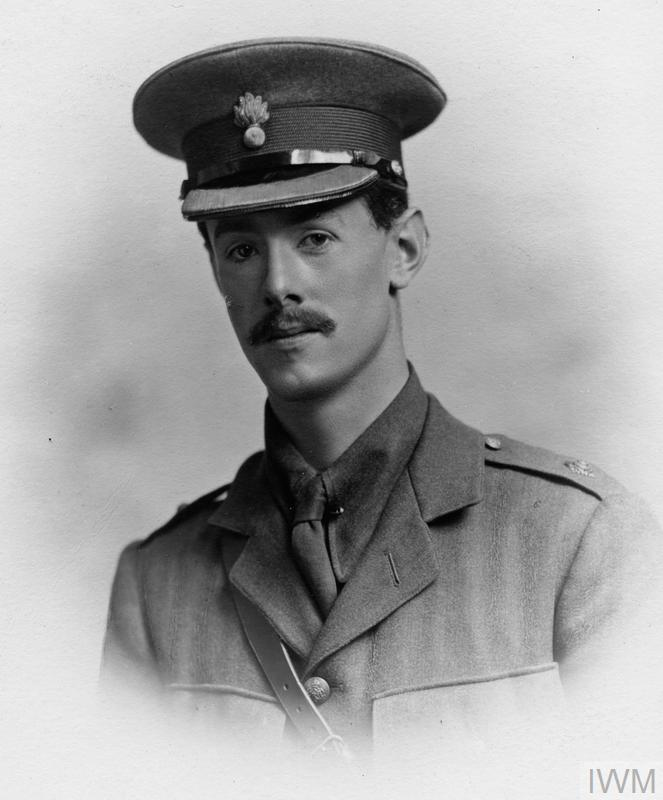
- Lang as a Grenadier Guards officer.

Personal information
- Full name: Arthur Horace Lang
- Born: 25 October 1890; Bombay, Bombay Presidency, British Raj
- Died: 25 January 1915 (aged 24); Missing in action near Cuinchy, Nord-Pas-de-Calais, France
- Batting: Right-handed
- Role: Wicket-keeper

Domestic team information
- Years: Team
- 1912–1913: Cambridge University
- 1911–1913: Sussex
- 1907–1911: Suffolk

Career statistics
Competition	First-class
Matches	22
Runs scored	830
Batting average	22.43
100s/50s	2/2
Top score	141
Balls bowled	–
Wickets	–
Bowling average	–
5 wickets in innings	–
10 wickets in match	–
Best bowling	–
Catches/stumpings	17/16
- Source: ESPNcricinfo, 9 December 2013

Arthur Horace Lang (25 October 1890 – 25 January 1915) was an English cricketer active in the first decade of the 1900s and in the first years of the following decade, making over twenty appearances in first-class cricket. Born at Bombay in the British Raj, Lang was a right-handed batsman who played as a wicket-keeper.

== Cricket career ==
Lang was educated at Harrow School, where he captained the school cricket team in 1908 and 1909. A year prior to captaining the school, Lang had made his debut in county cricket for Suffolk against Hertfordshire in the 1907 Minor Counties Championship, with him making two further appearances for the county in that season. He followed this up by playing three matches for Suffolk in 1908, but played only one match each in 1909 and 1910. He played three further matches for the county in the 1911 Minor Counties Championship, the last of which came against Norfolk.

In May 1911, Lang made his debut in first-class cricket for Sussex against Cambridge University at Fenner's, in what was his only first-class appearance of that season. He played six first-class matches for Sussex in 1912, as well as making his debut for Cambridge University (where he was at Trinity College) against the Marylebone Cricket Club. Lang secured his place in the Cambridge side in 1913, displacing the incumbent wicket-keeper Walter Franklin who the Cambridge selectors considered an inferior batsman to Lang. He played seven first-class matches for the university in 1913, as well as six for Sussex, most of which came in the latter stages of the County Championship. He made what would be a final appearance in first-class cricket for L. G. Robinson's XI in 1914. In a total of 22 first-class appearances, Lang scored 830 runs at an average of 22.43, with a high score of 141, while behind the stumps he took seventeen catches and made sixteen stumpings. He made two centuries in first-class cricket, both for Sussex.

== War service and disappearance ==
With the onset of the First World War, Lang enlisted in the British Army and served with the Grenadier Guards with the rank of second lieutenant. He was reported missing in action on the Western Front near the village of Cuinchy in northern France on 26 January 1915, presumed killed the previous day whilst serving attached to 1st Battalion Scots Guards.

Lang's Company (Right Flank) was caught when the Germans detonated a mine in the Brickstacks area east of Cuinchy and south of the La Bassee Canal on 25 January 1915. His body remained missing for 16 years until 22 January 1931, when he was exhumed in a group of 8 Scots Guardsmen, and reinterred in grave 12. E. 22. of the Canadian Cemetery No2 Neuville-St. Vaast, France.

== See also ==
- List of people who disappeared
