= Walter Franklin (cricketer) =

English cricketer (1891–1968)

Personal information
- Full name: Walter Bell Franklin
- Born: 16 August 1891; Upper Norwood, Surrey, England
- Died: 5 March 1968 (aged 76); Knodishall, Suffolk, England
- Batting: Right-handed
- Role: Wicket-keeper

Domestic team information
- Years: Team
- 1924–1937: Minor Counties
- 1914–1933: Marylebone Cricket Club
- 1911–1913: Cambridge University
- 1911–1946: Buckinghamshire

Career statistics
| Competition | First-class |
|---|---|
| Matches | 60 |
| Runs scored | 1,362 |
| Batting average | 18.91 |
| 100s/50s | –/4 |
| Top score | 77 |
| Catches/stumpings | 63/53 |
- Source: Cricinfo, 14 August 2011

Walter Bell Franklin (16 August 1891 – 5 March 1968) was an English cricketer. Franklin was a right-handed batsman who fielded as a wicket-keeper. He was considered the best amateur wicket-keeper of his time.

== Early career ==
Born in Upper Norwood, Greater London, he was educated at Repton School, where he represented the school cricket team. Franklin went on to make his debut for Buckinghamshire against Berkshire in the 1911 Minor Counties Championship. In that same season he made his first-class debut for Cambridge University against Yorkshire. He would go on to make a further 14 first-class appearances for the university, the last of which came against HDG Leveson-Gower's XI in 1913. He gained his Blue in 1912, but in 1913 he did find his opportunities limited by the arrival of Arthur Lang in the team, who the Cambridge selectors thought was a better batsman. A more than capable wicket-keeper, Franklin took 16 catches and made 15 stumpings, an unusual amount considering most wicket-keepers will take considerably more catches in their first-class careers. With the bat in hand, he scored 307 runs at an average of 21.92, with a high score of 68 not out. This score, one of two fifties he made for the university, came against Sussex in 1913.

1914 saw Franklin make his debut for the Marylebone Cricket Club, playing two matches against Oxford University. However, further first-class appearances and appearances for Buckinghamshire were cut short in later in that year when county cricket was cancelled due to the start of World War I. He served in the war and was mentioned once in dispatches, in July 1917, when the London Gazette published details of his temporary promotion to Captain, with him already holding the rank of temporary lieutenant. Franklin held this rank as a recruiter in the Volunteer Force.

Following the war, he returned to play for Buckinghamshire and was made county captain upon his return. In 1921, Buckinghamshire were offered first-class status and the chance to join the County Championship, however Buckinghamshire declined the invitation citing a lack of first-class facilities in the county. The early twenties were a successful period for the county, under his captaincy Buckinghamshire won the Minor Counties Championship in 1922, 1923 and 1925. Further first-class appearances followed for Franklin for the Marylebone Cricket Club, who he would go on to make a further 27 first-class appearances for, the last of which came against Kent in 1933. In 29 first-class matches for the MCC, he scored 660 runs at an average of 17.36, with a high score of 77. This score was one of two half centuries he made for the MCC, and came against Wales in 1925. Behind the stumps he was again proficient, taking 31 catches and making 25 stumpings.

== Later career ==
He made his first appearance for the Minor Counties in 1924 against HDG Leveson-Gower's XI. His abilities behind the stumps were rated so highly that he was selected to represent the Gentlemen against the Players in 1926. His performances for the Gentlemen in 1926, and his ability behind the stumps were written about by Sir Pelham Warner in his book Lord's, in which he wrote about how well Franklin kept in the match, as well as comparing him as being on the same level as George Duckworth, the then England Test wicket-keeper. He made 6 further first-class appearances for the Gentlemen, playing his last match against the players in 1930. An appearance for the North came in 1928, alongside his appearances for the MCC. He later made further first-class appearances for the Minor Counties in the mid thirties, mostly against touring teams, it was against the touring New Zealanders in 1937 that his final first-class appearance came. At Buckinghamshire, further success came under his captaincy, with the county winning the Minor Counties Championship in 1932 and 1938, making him the most successful captain in Buckinghamshire's history, an accolade which remains to this day. Having played for the county since 1911, making 200 appearances in that time, he finally retired from county cricket in 1946. For a Minor counties cricketer, Franklin made a large number of first-class appearances, making 60 in total and scoring 1,362 runs at an average of 18.91. It was perhaps behind the stumps that he stood out most, taking 63 catches and making an impressive 53 stumpings.

Following retirement he became president of the Minor Counties Cricket Association, as well as becoming president of Buckinghamshire County Cricket Club. He also contributed a chapter in the Lonsdale volume on wicket-keeping. He was also a master at the Haberdashers' Company. He died of a heart attack while playing croquet at Knodishall, Suffolk on 5 March 1968. He was survived by his wife, his son Dr. Jonathan M. Franklin and his daughter, Miss Virginia Franklin, with Franklin later being cremated in a private ceremony. A memorial service was held for Franklin on 8 May 1968, with the service being addressed by Sir Ian Bowater, then master of the Haberdashers' Company.
