= Meridian High School, Croydon =

Meridian High School

Location
- Fairchildes Avenue; New Addington, Greater London, CR0 0AH; England
- Coordinates: 51°20′00″N 0°00′05″W

Information
- Type: Academy
- Department for Education URN: 139074 Tables
- Ofsted: Reports
- Principal: Amy Anderson
- Gender: Coeducational
- Age: 11 to 18
- Enrolment: 1208
- Website: https://www.meridianhigh.london/

Meridian High School is a coeducational secondary school with academy status, located in the New Addington area of the London Borough of Croydon, England. The School takes its pupils mainly from the Addington, New Addington, Forestdale, Selsdon and Shirley areas.

The school converted to academy status on 1 June 2013.

The school changed its name to Meridian High School in June 2015 to avoid bad assumptions of students that people had of previous students that attended the school. The school had previously been called Addington High School and before that Fairchildes secondary modern School.

The Prime Meridian passes straight through the school playground, hence the current name.
