= Coombe Lane tram stop =

Tramlink tram stop in London, England

Coombe Lane
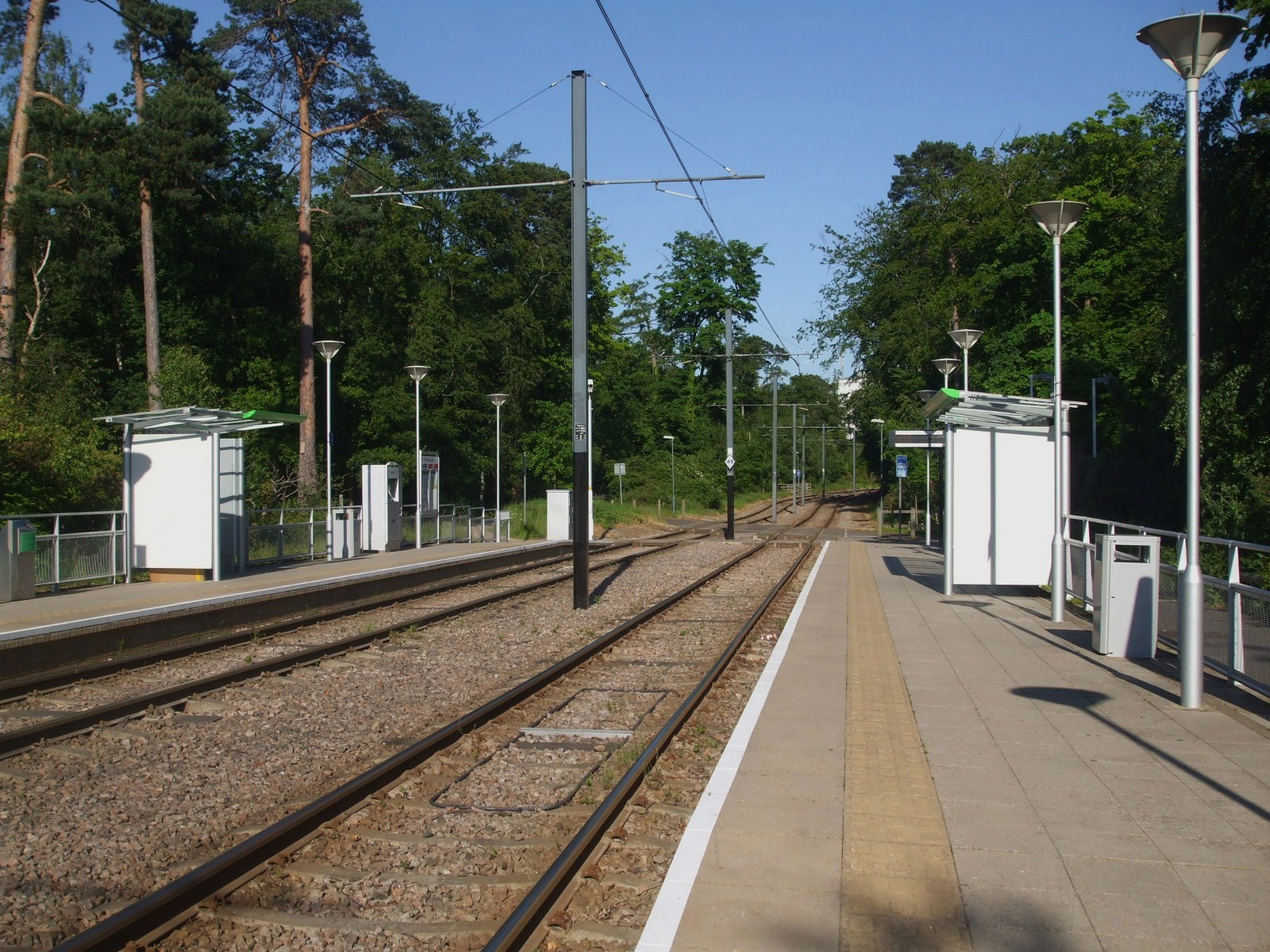
- Platforms looking east

General information
- Location: Coombe, Croydon
- Coordinates: 51.359798°N 0.060100°W
- Operated by: Tramlink
- Platforms: 2

Construction
- Structure type: At-grade
- Accessible: Yes

Other information
- Status: Unstaffed
- Website: Edit this at Wikidata

History
- Opened: 10 May 2000
Location
- Location in Croydon

Coombe Lane tram stop is a light rail stop in the London Borough of Croydon in the southern suburbs of London. It is located in Coombe, south of Addington Hills and serves Royal Russell School and the Ballards residential estate.

== Services ==
Coombe Lane is served by tram services operated by Tramlink. The tram stop is served by trams every 7-8 minutes between New Addington and West Croydon via East Croydon and Centrale.

A very small number of early morning and late evening services continue beyond Croydon to and from Therapia Lane and Wimbledon. During the evenings on weekends, the service is reduced to a tram every 15 minutes.

Services are operated using Bombardier CR4000 trams only Stadler Variobahn Trams used to operate from New Addington via West Croydon but they don't anymore

Preceding station	Tramlink	Following station
Lloyd Park towards West Croydon	Tramlink; New Addington to Croydon town centre	Gravel Hill towards New Addington

== Connections ==
The stop is served by London Buses routes 130 and 466 which provide connections to New Addington, Croydon Town Centre, Thornton Heath, Purley and Caterham.

Free interchange for journeys made within an hour is available between bus services and between buses and trams is available at Gravel Hill as part of Transport for London's Hopper Fare.
