= The Cedars School =

Coordinates: 51.42240°N 0.094431°W

Location
- 147 Central Hill; Upper Norwood; Croydon, Greater London, SE19 1RS; England

Information
- Type: Private school
- Motto: Latin: In Gaudio Serviamus (May We Serve Joyfully)
- Religious affiliation: Roman Catholic
- Established: September 2013
- Founder: PACT Educational Trust
- Local authority: Croydon London Borough Council
- Oversight: PACT Educational Trust
- Department for Education URN: 139811 Tables
- Headmaster: Dominic Rose
- Gender: Boys
- Age range: 11–18
- Enrolment: 193 (2019)
- Capacity: 260
- Houses: Falcon, Fleet, Ravensbourne, Tyburn, Effra
- Colours: Navy and Gold
- Accreditation: Independent Schools Association
- Website: www.thecedarsschool.org.uk

The Cedars School was an 11–18 boys, Roman Catholic, private school and sixth form. It was located in the Upper Norwood area of the London Borough of Croydon in England. In 2025 it merged with its sister school The Laurels School to form Fidelis College. The current site is the former location of Virgo Fidelis Convent Senior School, a Roman Catholic voluntary aided secondary school for girls. Prior to the merger, the school site was also shared with The Laurels School for girls.

Until September 2021 the school was located in the Lloyd Park area of Croydon. It was established in September 2013 by the PACT Educational Trust in a Grade II listed building dating back to the 18th century. It was the first senior school in the country to be based on the ethos of Opus Dei and was located in the Roman Catholic Archdiocese of Southwark.

== History ==
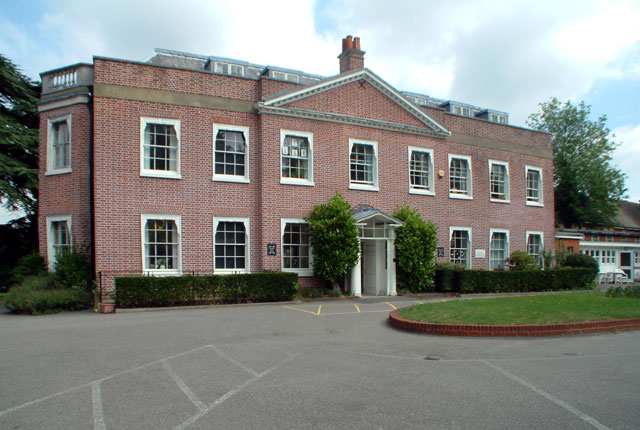
Geoffrey Harris House in 2005, previously occupied by the school.

The Cedars School was established in September 2013 as a Roman Catholic, private school for boys by the PACT Educational Trust, a parent-led charity group, with an initial intake of 46 and fees of £3,900 a term. The trust had initially intended to open the school as a free school but was put off due to the "very restrictive" admissions policy that would have stopped them from reserving places for Catholics. It is the first senior school in the country to be based on the ethos of Opus Dei, which does not directly run the school but supported its opening and has links with the trust.

The school opened in a Grade II listed building that was acquired by the trust, dates back to 1761 and was known as the Coombe House. Having gone through several owners and let to various tenants in the 1830s, it was owned by Frank Lloyd in the 1890s, a newspaper magnate and son of Edward Lloyd (owned the house before him), and lived there for 35 years until his death in 1927. The neighbouring Lloyd Park was created from land bequeathed by Lloyd and is named after him. By 1937, it became a nursing home for army officers and used as St Margaret's School for disabled children between 1946 and 1985. Two extensions were added during the 1950s, and the building was latterly owned by an NHS trust as Geoffrey Harris House, a residential care home for those with mental health and learning difficulties.

On 22 March 2017, the Real Madrid Foundation opened its first football school in the United Kingdom in partnership with the school; Football for Unity, a non-profit pro-football organisation; and the Kinetic Foundation, a local sports charity that was set up following the 2011 England riots. The Foundation already runs similar schools in other countries and said, "The aim of the project is to support children and young people by offering them activities to develop their skills, both in sports and relational and social integration." Officially opened by former player Emilio Butragueño, it involves free football sessions at the school that are led by coaches trained by Real Madrid.

The school moved to its current site in Upper Norwood in September 2021. This site is shared with The Laurels School for girls, and both schools share a sports hall.
