= Harris Academy Beulah Hill =

Location
- Spurgeon Road; Upper Norwood, Greater London, SE19 3UG; England; 51.41375°N 0.09439°W

Information
- Type: Academy
- Established: 1958
- Department for Education URN: 150055 Tables
- Ofsted: Reports
- Principal: Billy Goldsmith
- Gender: Coeducational
- Age: 11 to 16
- Website: https://www.harrisbeulahhill.org.uk/

Harris Academy Beulah Hill is a coeducational secondary school located in the Upper Norwood area of the London Borough of Croydon, England. The school is sponsored by the Harris Federation.

== History ==
Established in 1958, it was formerly known as Ingram County Secondary Girls' School, Westwood High School for Girls and then Westwood Girls' College for Languages and Arts.

The school was formerly a community school under the direct control of Croydon London Borough Council. However in January 2013 the school was rated as "inadequate" in an Ofsted inspection report and was put into special measures. The governors of the school decided to pursue academy status, with the school becoming part of the Harris Federation in September 2013. The school was then renamed Harris Academy Upper Norwood.

In September 2014, the school amalgamated with Harris Academy South Norwood, sharing teachers and a sixth form campus.

In September 2023 the school formally demerged from Harris Academy South Norwood, and became Harris Academy Beulah Hill.

== Academics ==
Harris Academy Beulah Hill offers GCSEs, BTECs and other vocational courses as programmes of study for pupils.

The school also offers a sixth form provision in consortium with the Harris Central Sixth Form.
