= Winterbourne Boys' Academy =

Location
- Winterbourne Road; Thornton Heath, Greater London, CR7 7QT; England; 51°23′58″N 0°06′53″W

Information
- Type: Academy
- Motto: Vincam (I will conquer)
- Established: 1906
- Local authority: London Borough of Croydon
- Department for Education URN: 140683 Tables
- Ofsted: Reports
- Executive headteacher: Tony Ahmet
- Head of School: Emma Larkham
- Staff: c. 25
- Gender: Boys
- Age: 7 to 11
- Enrolment: c. 225
- Website: https://www.winterbourneboysacademy.com/

Winterbourne Boys' Academy (formerly Winterbourne Junior Boys' School) is a junior school in the London Borough of Croydon for boys aged between 7 and 11 years. Along with its sister Girls' School, the schools are the last remaining single-sex, state-funded junior schools in the UK.

== General information ==
The school is on Winterbourne Road in Thornton Heath. The Local Education Authority for the school is the London Borough of Croydon, however the school converted to academy status in April 2014. The school caters for pupils from Year 3 to Year 6. The uniform of the school is a grey jumper with the school logo, white shirt and grey or black trousers (a sweatshirt with the school logo is also available, as is a fleece jacket). There are approximately 250 pupils on roll (as of February 2011) with a maximum of 30 pupils in each of 8 classes (2 classes per year group). From September 2007, there has been an additional class in the morning sessions: from September until April (when the Year 6 SATs take place) this consists of some pupils from each of the two Year 6 classes, and from April until July this consists of some pupils from each of the two Year 5 classes.

== History ==
The school was opened in 1906 as a combined Boys, Girls and Infants school on 27 August 1906, but became three separate schools on 6 January 1907. It was originally called Winterbourne Road School.

The following information is based on the publication printed for the school's centenary "Winterbourne Times 1907-2007"

At the turn of the 20th century, it was decided that a school was needed in the locality, as the nearest school was Ecclesbourne. The Board of Education in Whitehall purchased land in Winterbourne Road, and initially decided to call the school "Winterbourne Road Board School". The new school (with three departments: Boys, Girls, Infants) would cater for 1200 pupils.

At first, owing to the large numbers awaiting admission to the school, one department was opened in August 1906 as a temporary mixed school with accommodation for 540 with two classes of 50 pupils in the school hall.

In January 1907, the school was finally completed as follows:

- Boys Department:
  Accommodation for 408 Pupils
  Headmaster: Mr. J. Potter
- Girls Department:
  Accommodation for 408 pupils
  Headmistress: Miss J.E. Cash
- Infants Department:
  Accommodation for 444 pupils
  Headmistress: Mrs G.L. Fowles

== War memorial ==
There was a war memorial in the building commemorating two former Masters and 50 old boys. The first pupils of the school were just of an age to serve in World War I. Although the memorial itself is now lost, the inscription is known (links are to known entries at the Commonwealth War Graves Commission website):

"Lest We Forget"
To the honoured Memory of the Masters and
Past Scholars of this school who laid down their lives
in the Great War 1914-1919
| Charles S. Marshall | | Geoffrey C. Foster |
| Sidney Allen | Albert B. Francis | Lawrence Page |
| Albert G. Baker | William F. Frohock [listed as W.E. Frohock at CWGC] | Walter S. Peters |
| Cecil L. Bearman | Leslie A. Green | Cyril E. Ridley |
| Fred J. Boxall | Frank Hagley | Gerald A. Stocker |
| Gordon E. Benham | Herbert J. Hatcher | William A. Smith |
| Henry J. Baker | John W. Hemmings | Basil T. Treffry |
| Otho J. Braddon | Hedley Hawken | Richard H. Treffry |
| Eric L. Crofts | Frank H. Johnson | Archibald Turner |
| Eric J. Coppard | Walter Knight | Albert A. Taylor |
| Raymond Cole | Harold D. Mitchell | Charles A. Woolger |
| Cyril P. Cozens | Gomez B. Morris | William H. Whisson |
| William Comber | Percy Money | William Whide |
| John H. Checker | Donald F. Neill | Richard Whibley |
| Albert S. Denning | John H. Nealon | Christopher Winchester |
| George Evans | Edward H. Nash | Harold E. Wootton |
| Harry Ease | Stuart Nightingale | Sidney A. Walker |
| Eric Evans | Arthur J. Phillips | |

== Centenary celebrations ==
In the summer of 2007, the schools on the site joined in celebrations to mark the centenary of the schools' opening. This culminated in the unveiling of a plaque by the Mayor of Croydon in front of the pupils of all three schools, followed by the mass release of balloons.

Photographs of the Centenary Celebrations (taken on a mobile 'phone)

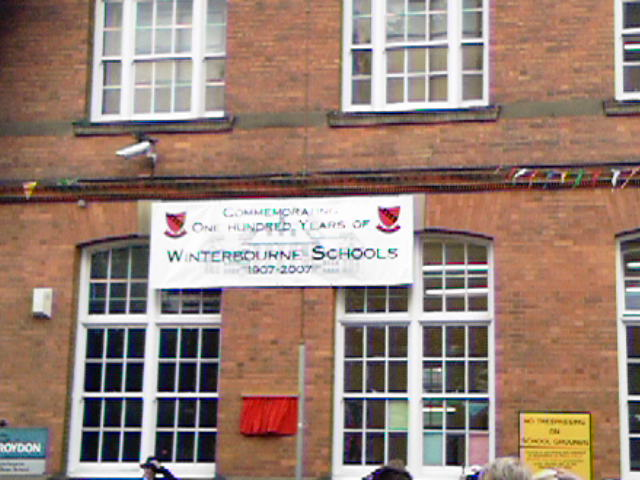
The Centenary Banner

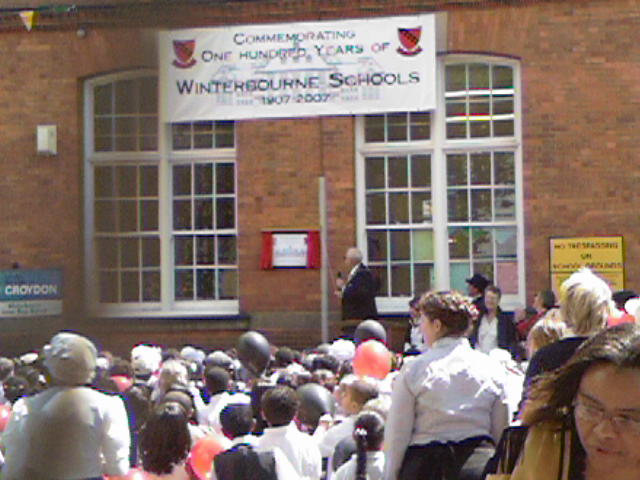
Unveiling of the Centenary Plaque by the Mayor of Croydon

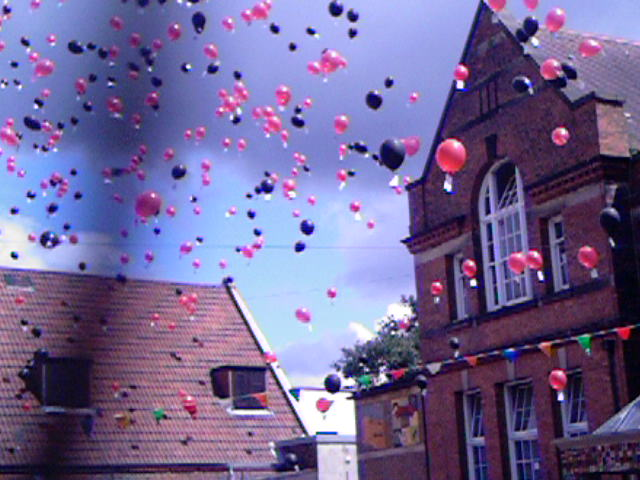
Release of the balloons by children from all 3 schools!

== Conversion to an academy ==
A consultation was held (ending in Spring 2014) about the conversion of the school to an academy with Platanos Trust. The conversion to an academy occurred 1 April 2014, in line with the date proposed for this conversion by the Department for Education. The school was later renamed Winterbourne Boys' Academy.

== Headteachers ==
The headteachers of the boys' school have been:

| From | To | Headteacher |
|---|---|---|
| 27 August 1906 | 31 October 1922 | James Potter |
| 1 November 1922 | 31 December 1928 | Arthur W. McLeod |
| 1 January 1928 | 31 August 1936 | Joseph Vaughan Williams |
| 1 September 1936 | 20 May 1945 | David Bartlett Robinson |
| 21 May 1945 | 31 August 1945 | Interregnum |
| 1 September 1945 | 31 December 1954 | John 'Jock' Frame |
| 1 January 1955 | 5 April 1974 | Roger Alan Smith |
| 23 April 1974 | 31 August 1974 | R. S. Hunt (Acting) |
| 1 September 1974 | 31 August 1990 | Peter Clements |
| 1 September 1990 | 31 December 1990 | Mrs G. Whiting (Acting) |
| 1 January 1991 | 31 August 1991 | Marjorie Archer (Acting) |
| 1 September 1991 | 31 August 2011 | Jonathan Barker |
| 1 September 2011 | 31 August 2013 | Jonathan Barker (Executive Headteacher) and Emma Larkham (Co-Headteacher) |
| 1 September 2013 | 4 April 2014 | Tony Ahmet (Executive Headteacher); Emma Larkham (Head of School) |
| 4 April 2014 | Current | Charmaine Henny (Acting Headteacher) |
