= Mary Nesbitt =

British socialite and courtesan

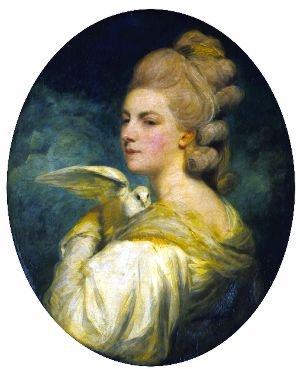
- Painting of Mary Nesbitt by the artist Joshua Reynolds, 1781, Wallace Collection, London
- Born: Mary Davis; 1742; Covent Garden (alleged), England
- Died: 1825 (aged 82–83); Paris, France
- Occupations: Socialite and courtesan
- Known for: Mixing in the elevated circles of government and royalty in late 18th century Great Britain

Mary Nesbitt (born 1742/3 – died 1825) was an English upper class socialite and courtesan who mixed in the elevated circles of government and royalty in late 18th century Great Britain. Her home, Norwood House, in Upper Norwood, then Surrey, now South London, became a meeting place for the rich and powerful.

== Life ==
She was born Mary Davis, in poverty and of unknown parentage. Her enemies later alleged that she had been born 'in a wheelbarrow' in Covent Garden. She was also early on known as Polly Davis.

Her society career began as an artist's model for Sir Joshua Reynolds in 1764. Through this connection she began her career as a courtesan. Simon Luttrell, nicknamed the King of Hell and later first Earl of Carhampton, was possibly her original seducer. Her association with Luttrell may be the origin of her later nickname of Hellfire Davies.

Through Luttrell she was introduced to Alexander Nesbitt (bap 1730 – d 1772), the youngest of three sons of Thomas Nesbitt, a merchant banker in the City of London.

Mary married Nesbitt, on 25 February 1768, at St Martin-in-the-Fields, with Luttrell as a witness.

Nesbitt gave her the right to live in his house at Upper Norwood, Surrey, for the rest of her life. The couple also kept a home at 10 Buckingham Street, London. Street, London.

Alexander Nesbitt suffered a mental collapse and was confined in private lodgings near Blackfriars around 1769, he died in 1772. Mary's enemies, the news sheet Tête-à-tête and the anonymous Junius, attributed his insanity to her disrespectful treatment of him.

Around 1771 Mary became the mistress of the Hon. Augustus John Hervey (1724–1779), a naval officer, and second son of Lord Hervey of Ickworth (1696–1743). Hervey became third Earl of Bristol in 1775 and Mary and Augustus lived together, apparently faithfully, at Norwood House. They also had residences at 6 St James's Square, London and at Ickworth House, Suffolk. They were prevented from marrying when the earl's divorce petition was dismissed in 1779.

On Hervey's death in 1779 Mary received the manor of Evedon, other land in Lincolnshire, and £5000 from the sale of about 186 acres (0.75 km^{2}) in Suffolk. She also received a share of the stock and furniture at 6 St James's Square and at Ickworth, valued at £7378 12s. 11d. She continued to live at her own house in Upper Norwood, which she enlarged.

Her salon at Norwood was frequented by men such as George Rose, secretary to the Treasury, and many young aspirants to political office. During the French Revolution she travelled in diplomatic circles on the continent. This may indicate that she had been recruited by prime minister William Pitt as a government agent in his covert attempts to restore the French monarchy. She now attracted public praise. On 25 September 1797, the Morning Chronicle acknowledged that "this celebrated woman", despite "the miscellany of her life", had "acquired an elevation ... which she has preserved with dignity", using "her influence with the great in favour of the unfortunate".

She was forced to let Norwood House due to reduced financial circumstances in the early 19th century. Mary then frequently lived abroad, where in 1808 she met Madame Tussaud and bought her a house in Crystal Palace. It is believed from there Tussaud took up her waxwork museum in 1821 at Montreuil-sur-Mer, Pas-de-Calais, France and in 1822 in Switzerland.

Nesbitt is believed to have died, aged eighty-two, in Paris, where she was buried on 4 November 1825.
