= Lloyd Park (Croydon) =

Public park in Croydon, London, England

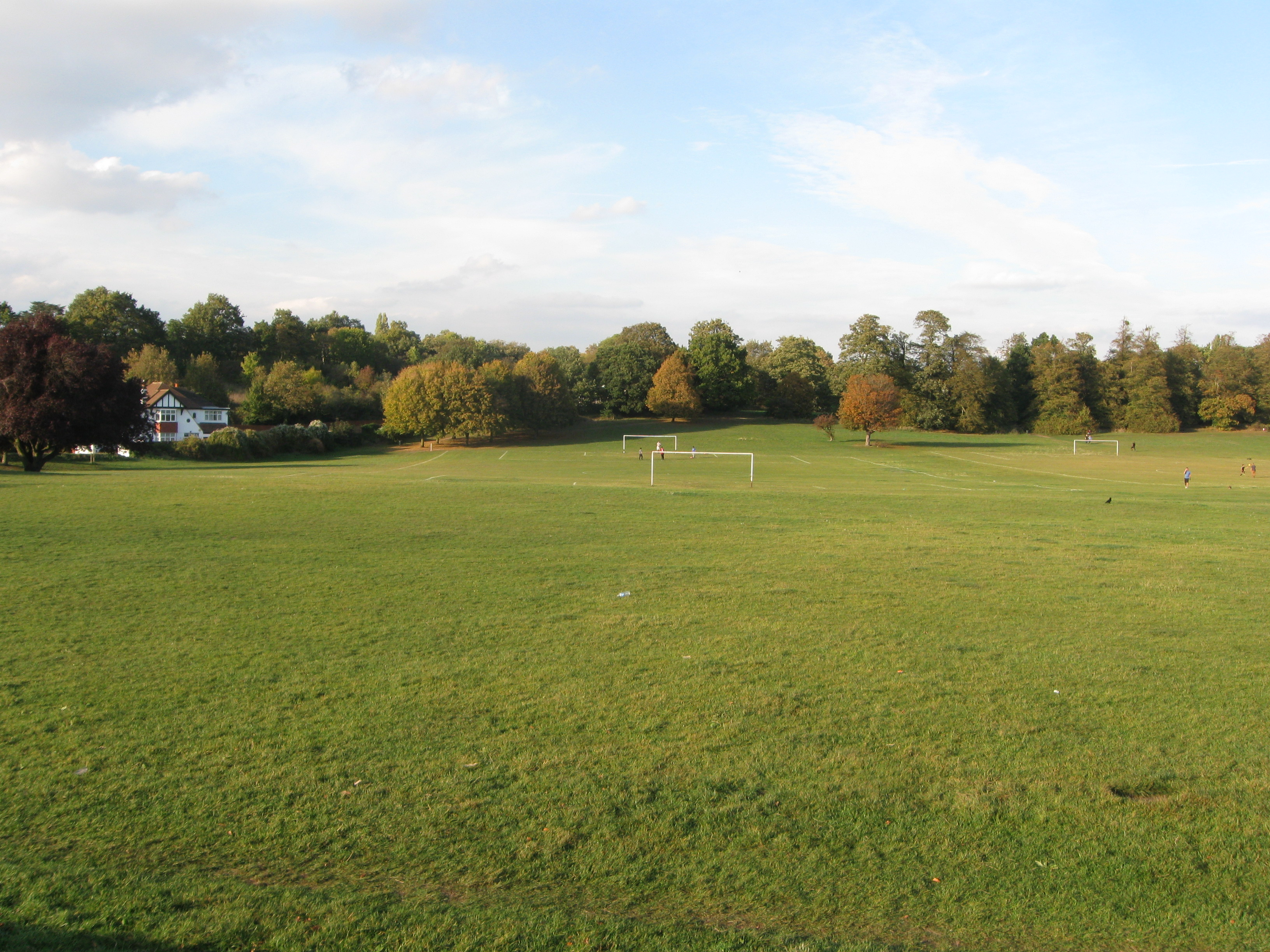
- Lloyd Park in October 2018, looking north from near the main entrance, towards Deepdene

- Location within Greater London
- Type: Public park
- Location: Coombe Road, Croydon, UK
- OS grid: TQ338646
- Coordinates: 51.364°N 0.0794495°W
- Area: 114 acres (46 ha)
- Created: 1927
- Operator: London Borough of Croydon
- Status: Open all year
- Public transit: Tramlink to Lloyd Park tram stop

Lloyd Park (also known as Lloyd Country Park) is a 114 acres (46 ha) park on the outskirts of central Croydon, Greater London, managed by the London Borough of Croydon. It is bordered by Coombe Road to the south and Lloyd Park Avenue to the west. To the north, access is from Deepdene and Mapledale Avenue, and the park adjoins Grimwade Avenue and Addiscombe Cricket Club. To the east the park is bordered by Shirley Park Golf Course. It was created from land owned by Frank Lloyd (son of Edward Lloyd) a newspaper proprietor who died in 1927 which was bequeathed to the Borough of Croydon by his family, after his death.

The Tramlink, New Addington line, runs along the southern edge of the park parallel to Coombe Road.

Lloyd Park hosts Lloyd parkrun every Saturday morning at 9 am and Lloyd junior parkrun every Sunday morning at 9 am.

== Description and usage ==
The park is not enclosed, as would typically be the case for suburban parks. Coombe Road is bordered by a low hedge and grass-covered earth banks have been raised along the open Lloyd Park Avenue side to deter vehicular access. It is open 24 hours a day throughout the year. The main entrance is from Coombe Road, immediately adjacent to the Lloyd Park tram stop, where two car-parking areas are available. 'The Lounge Cafe' is also sited next to the car parks.

Facilities available include rugby and football pitches, bowls, hard court tennis, children's playground, car parking, cafe, open-air gymnasium, disc golf, changing rooms and facilities, orienteering, cross country courses, horse riding and a pond.

Towards the northern edge of the park is an area known as The Squashes, where a line of springs emerge during wet weather, the most frequent being Rippingill.

Until 2010, the park was regularly used for the Croydon Summer Festival, hosting a variety of musical acts including, Martha and the Vandellas, The Proclaimers, The Lightning Seeds, The Damned and Courtney Pine. It is also the venue for the Croydon Town and Country Show.

In May/June 2019, the inaugural The Ends festival, headlined by Damian Marley, was held in the park.

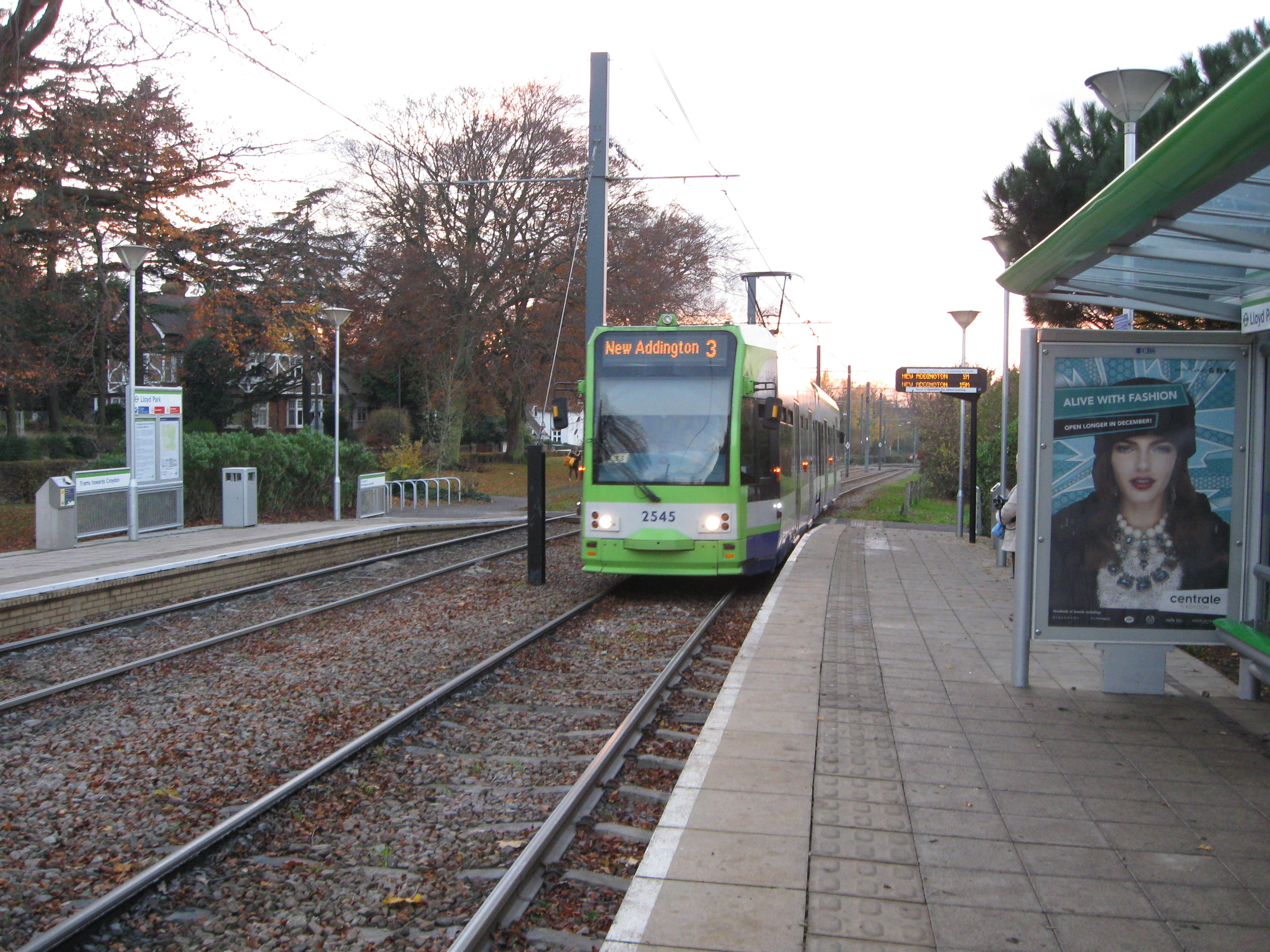
Lloyd Park tram stop

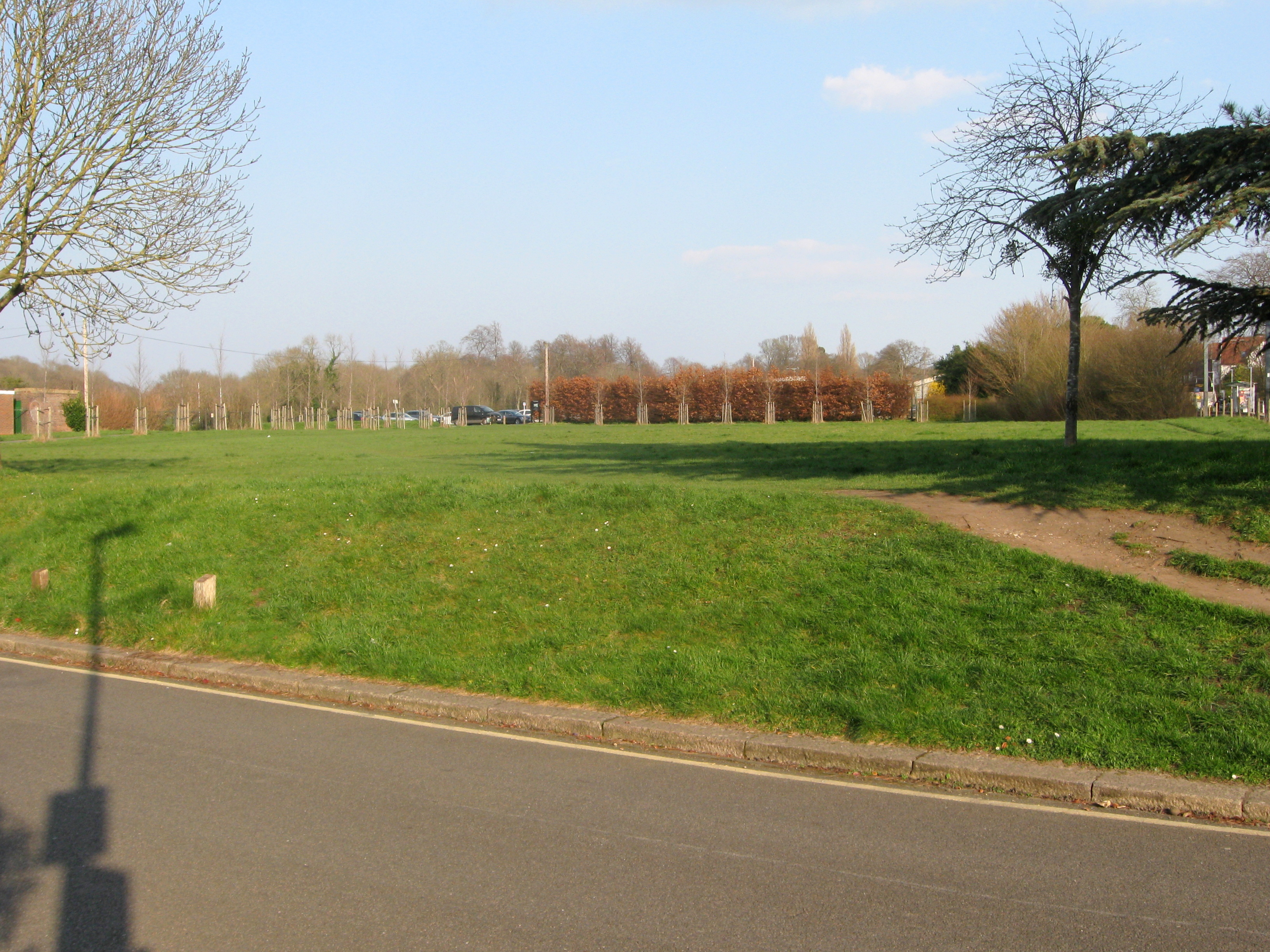
View of Lloyd Park from SW corner in February 2022

== See also ==
- List of parks and open spaces in the London Borough of Croydon
- Parks and open spaces in the London Borough of Croydon
- Coombe, Croydon
- Coombe Wood
