= Lloyd Park tram stop =

Tramlink tram stop in London, England

Lloyd Park
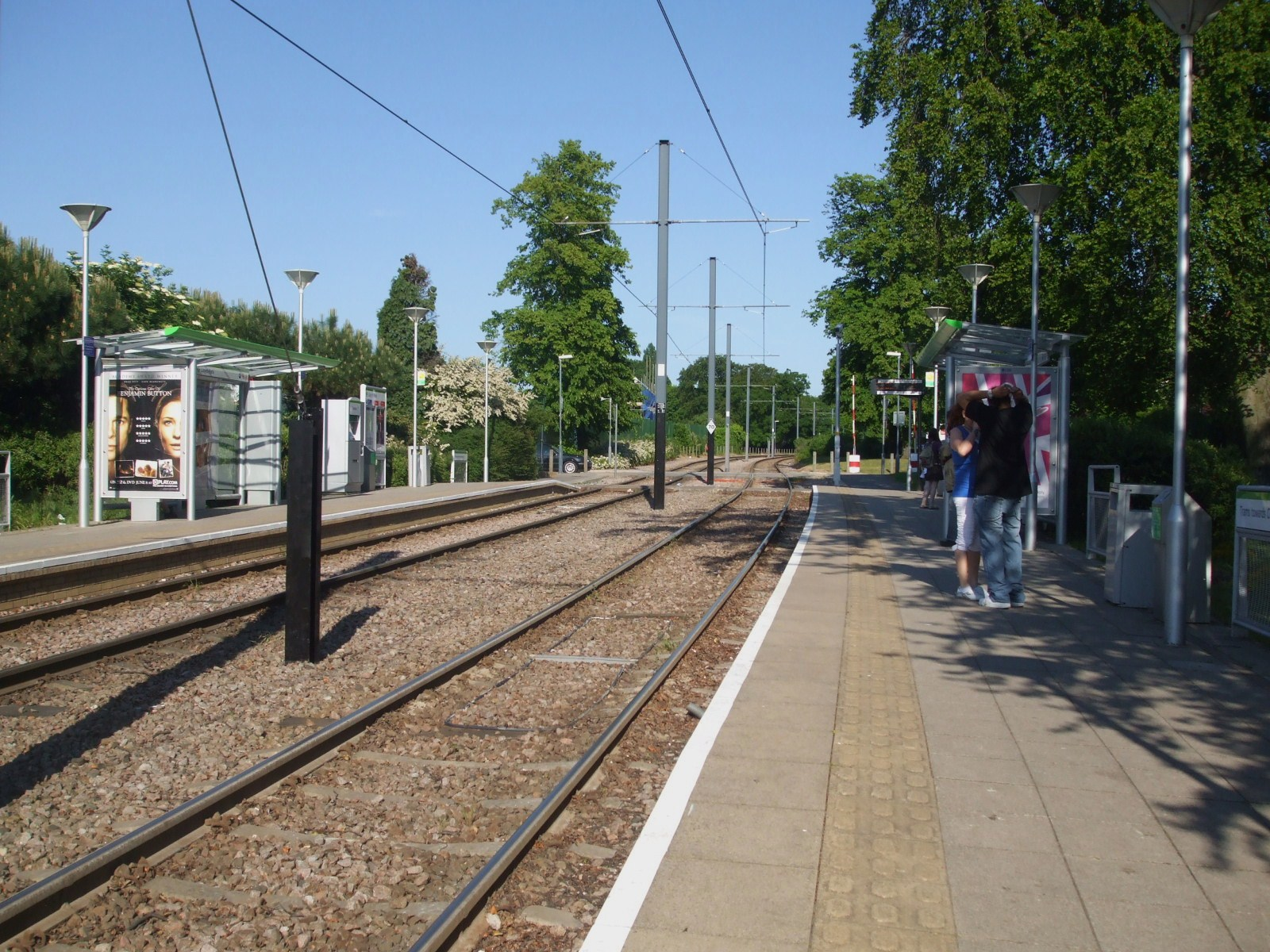
- Platforms looking east

General information
- Location: South Croydon, Croydon
- Coordinates: 51.364188°N 0.080703°W
- Operated by: Tramlink
- Platforms: 2

Construction
- Structure type: At-grade
- Accessible: Yes

Other information
- Status: Unstaffed
- Website: Official website

History
- Opened: 10 May 2000
Location
- Location in Croydon

Lloyd Park tram stop is a light rail stop that serves Lloyd Park, located in the London Borough of Croydon in south London. It is 200 metres east of the site of the Coombe Road railway station, on the former Woodside and South Croydon Railway.

== Services ==
Lloyd Park is served by tram services operated by Tramlink. The tram stop is served by trams every 7–8 minutes between New Addington and West Croydon via East Croydon and Centrale.

A very small number of early morning and late evening services continue beyond Croydon to and from Therapia Lane and Wimbledon. During the evenings on weekends, the service is reduced to a tram every 15 minutes.

Preceding station	Tramlink	Following station
Sandilands towards West Croydon	Tramlink; New Addington to Croydon town centre	Coombe Lane towards New Addington
