= Upper Norwood =

Area of south London

Coordinates: 51.4196°N 0.0877°W

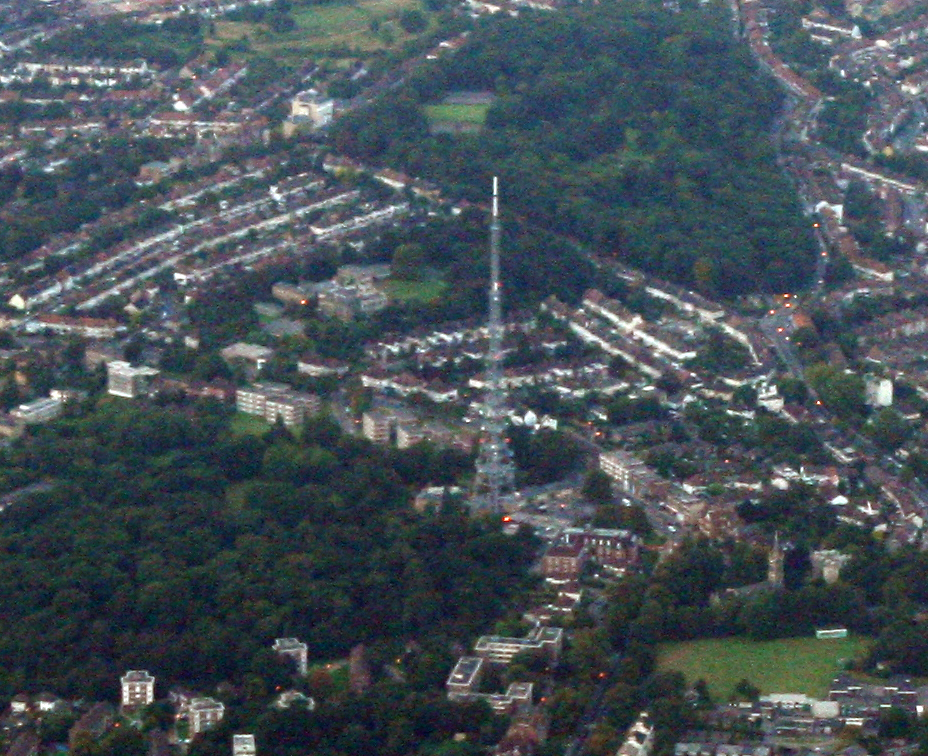
- Upper Norwood from the air, with the Croydon transmitting station in the centre

- Location within Greater London
- Population: 16,082 (2011 Census.Ward)
- OS grid reference: TQ329707
- London borough: Bromley; Croydon; Lambeth; Southwark
- Ceremonial county: Greater London
- Region: London
- Country: England
- Sovereign state: United Kingdom
- Post town: LONDON
- Postcode district: SE19
- Dialling code: 020
- Police: Metropolitan
- Fire: London
- Ambulance: London
- UK Parliament: Streatham and Croydon North; Dulwich and West Norwood
- London Assembly: Bexley and Bromley; Croydon and Sutton; Lambeth and Southwark

Upper Norwood is an area of south London, England, within the London Boroughs of Bromley, Croydon, Lambeth and Southwark. It is north of Croydon. The eastern part of it is better known as the Crystal Palace area. The SE19 London postcode covers the entirety of the district.

Upper Norwood is one of the highest areas in London, situated along the London clay ridge known as Beulah Hill, which offers panoramic views northwards to central London and southwards to Central Croydon and the North Downs. Most housing dates from the 19th and 20th centuries, with large detached properties along the ridge and smaller, semi-detached and terraced dwellings on the slopes. There are some more modern areas of social housing that date from the 1970s, as well as the recent construction of larger apartment buildings on Beulah Hill.

== History ==
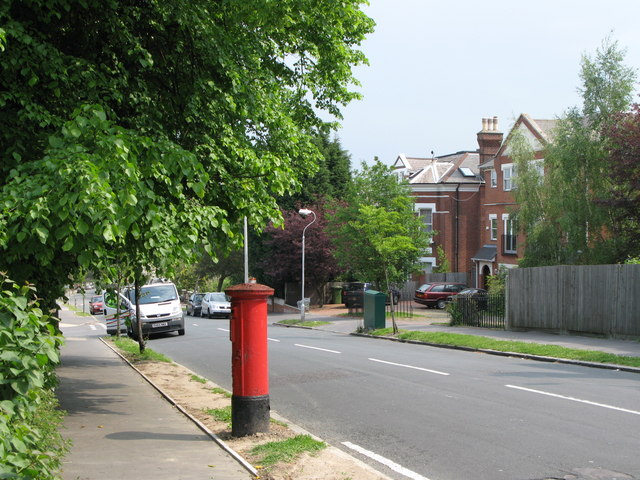
Hermitage Road, a Victorian suburban street in Upper Norwood

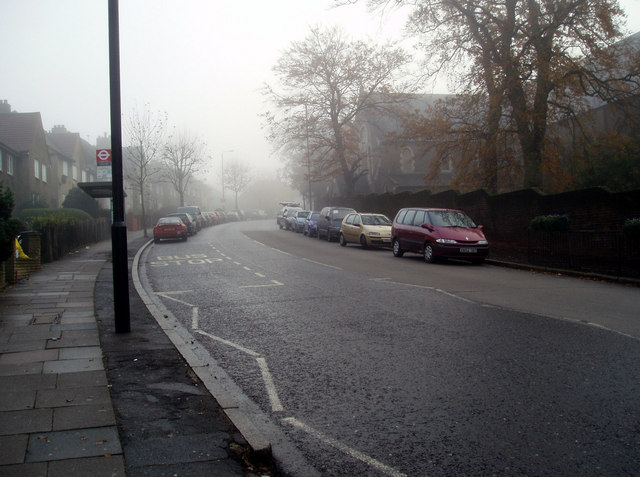
A misty day on Central Hill, Upper Norwood. To the right of the line of parked cars is the chapel of Virgo Fidelis Convent Senior School.

For centuries, Upper Norwood was occupied by the Great North Wood, an extensive area of natural oak forest which formed a wilderness close to the southern edge of the ever-expanding city of London. The name "Norwood" is a contraction of "North Wood" (and should not be confused with Northwood or Norwood Green, both in west London). Local legend has it that Sir Francis Drake's ship, the Golden Hind, was made from timber cut from trees in this area. The forest was a popular area for Londoners' recreation until the 19th century, when it began to be built over. It was also a haunt of Gypsies, with many local street names and pubs recording the link, notably Gipsy Hill. The area still retains woodland in large amounts for an urban area.

The Beulah Hill ridge was used as a sighting-point for the Anglo-French Survey (1784–1790), which measured the precise distance between the Royal Greenwich Observatory and the Paris Observatory, using trigonometry. It was particularly useful for this purpose on account of both its height and its relative proximity to Greenwich.

In 1831, one of England's most prominent architects, Decimus Burton, designed a spa and pleasure gardens below Beulah Hill and off what is now Spa Hill in a bowl of land on the south facing side of the hill around a spring of chalybeate water. Burton was responsible for the Beulah Spa Hotel (demolished c. 1935) and the layout of the grounds. Its official title was The Royal Beulah Spa and Gardens. It became a popular society venue attracting large crowds to its fêtes. One widely publicized event was a "Grand Scottish Fete" on 16 September 1834 "with a tightrope performance by Pablo Fanque", the black circus performer who would later dominate the Victorian circus and achieve immortality in the Beatles song Being for the Benefit of Mr. Kite! The spa closed in 1856, soon after the opening nearby of The Crystal Palace.

The Crystal Palace was rebuilt nearby on Sydenham Hill in 1854, following its success at The Great Exhibition of 1851 in Hyde Park. It was destroyed in a spectacular fire in 1936. The importance of this building and its impact on the locality for decades, led to the area immediately around the palace and its park becoming known as Crystal Palace.

The amateur Crystal Palace football club was formed in 1861 by members of the Crystal Palace Cricket Club, who used the cricket ground for football in winter. In 1863 the amateur Crystal Palace football club became founding members of the Football Association of England, and in 1872 they reached the semi-finals of the first F.A. cup competition. The professional Crystal Palace FC was founded in 1905. From that year until the onset of World War I, the Crystal Palace ground, then the largest football stadium in Europe, became the F.A. Cup final ground. Crystal Palace F.C moved to nearby Selhurst Park in 1924. Crystal Palace has continued as an important sporting venue. In 1964 the Crystal Palace National Sports Centre was established adjacent to the park, and remains open in use this day.

The most easterly district of Upper Norwood is now known as Crystal Palace and is the commercial hub of Upper Norwood, known locally as the "Triangle". The most westerly district is known as Crown Point. The central district was once known as Norwood New Town, but this name is now only seen on older maps. The French impressionist Camille Pissarro painted around the area in the early 1870s, including in neighbouring Sydenham, producing scenes such as a view from Fox Hill, Upper Norwood, now in the National Gallery and the Crystal Palace painted from the Parade, now in the Art Institute of Chicago.

In March 1966, shortly before the World Cup tournament, the Jules Rimet trophy was stolen from an exhibition at Central Hall Westminster. It was found seven days later in Beulah Hill by a dog named "Pickles". The story made national headlines.

== Landmarks ==
St Joseph's College is a Roman Catholic boys' secondary school which was first established in Upper Norwood in 1855. The school operates a coeducational sixth form. Harris Academy Beulah Hill was established in the area as Westwood High School in 1958.

The Cedars School and The Laurels School are Roman Catholic independent schools located on the former site of Virgo Fidelis Convent Senior School on Central Hill, founded in 1848. They occupy an eighteenth-century grand house, once the home of the notable socialite and courtesan Mary Nesbitt.

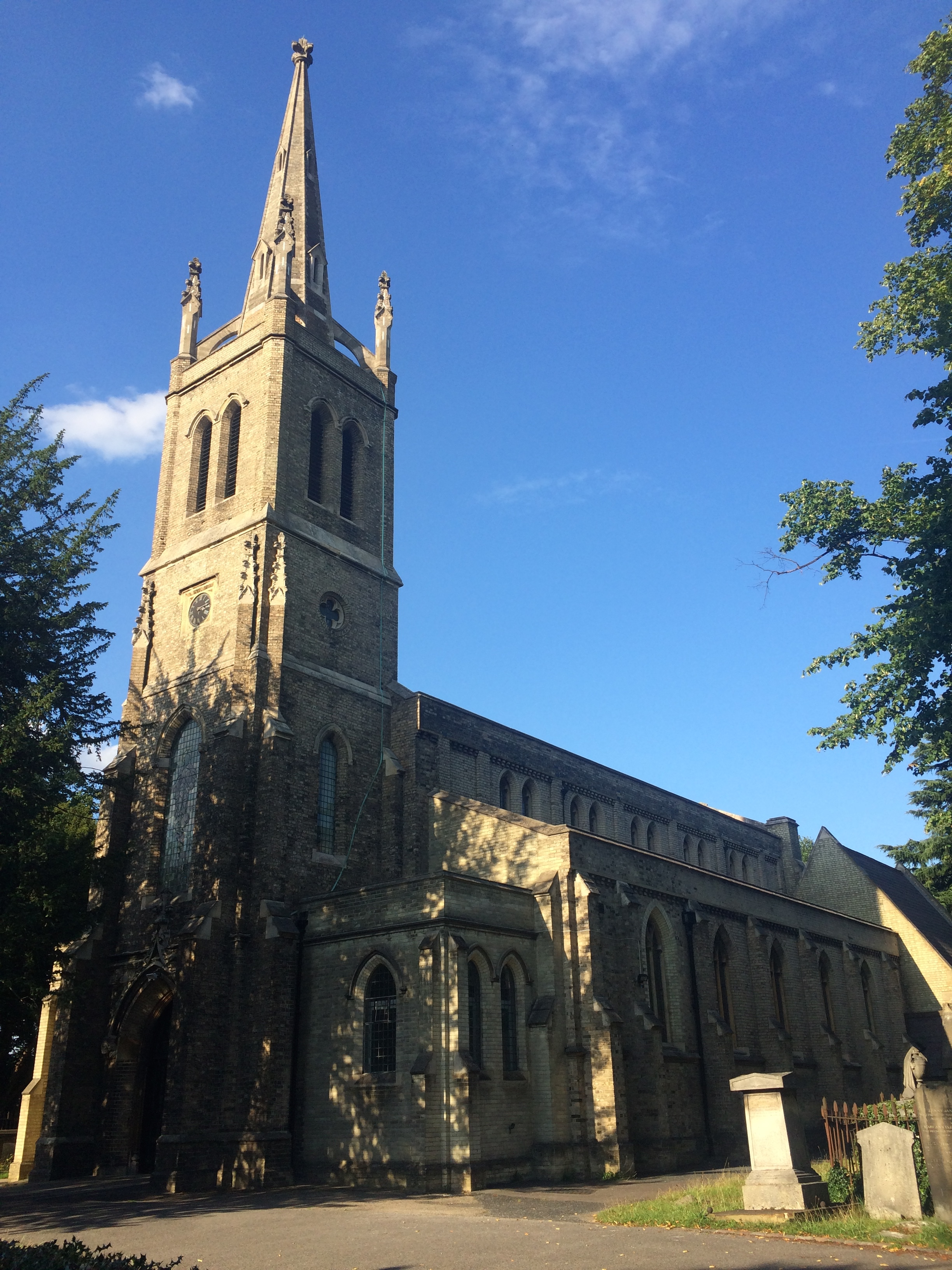
All Saints' Church, an Anglican parish church at Upper Norwood

The Church of England Parish Church of St John the Evangelist on Sylvan Road, completed in 1887, is a notable example of the work of the architect John Loughborough Pearson. Designed in the Gothic Revival style, this Grade II* listed red brick building features some significant interior stone decoration and a stained glass window by Ninian Comper, who lived in the area.

Upper Norwood Library in Westow Hill, the only independent public library in the UK, was built in 1899 by joint agreement of the London Borough of Croydon and the London Borough of Lambeth. The library holds a Local History Collection of the Upper Norwood district and the Crystal Palace.

A notable park in the area is Upper Norwood Recreation Ground. Its 19-acre (77,000 m^{2}) site is part of the Harold Road Conservation Area. Its boundary is defined by Chevening Road, Hermitage Road, Eversley Road and Harold Road. One of London's hidden rivers, River Effra flows under the park and at the Harold Road end a wellhead exists. It was covered in the 1940s. The Upper Norwood Recreation Ground was a location in Patrick Keiller's 1983 film, Norwood, and in Chris Shepherd's 2010 film Bad Night for the Blues.

The Croydon transmitting station, a TV transmitter tower, stands on the hill at Upper Norwood and a second larger TV transmitter, the Crystal Palace transmitting station, stands in Crystal Palace Park. Together these make the district a landmark location, visible from any part of the London area.

In 1985 a Safeway supermarket opened on Westow Street. In 1990 the exterior of this branch featured in a clip of the television drama series Grange Hill. The store was acquired by Morrisons in March 2004, who closed it in November 2005. The lease of the vacant store was purchased by Sainsbury's in August 2006.

== Transport ==
The hilly nature of the land has restricted the construction of railways through the district. The former branch line terminus at Crystal Palace High Level railway station which opened in 1865 closed in 1954, and the remaining Crystal Palace railway station is some distance below Upper Norwood, and approached by many steps. However, Crystal Palace Parade remains an important bus interchange and many residents are instead reliant on local bus routes to travel to West Norwood, Tulse Hill, Streatham, West Dulwich or Norbury railway stations. The significant disconnection from the capital's rail/tube network, and lack of high street, shops or amenities in its western half, has led to it having lower house prices than other areas possessing scenic views of London.

== Notable people ==
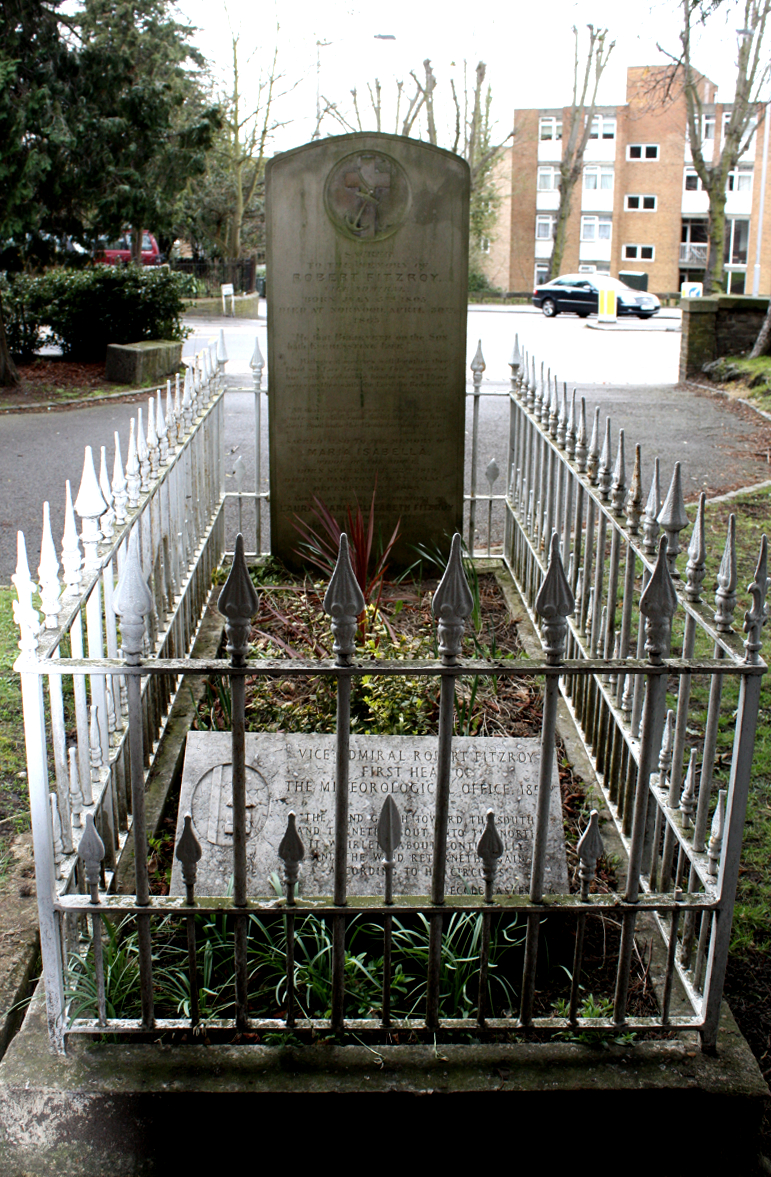
Robert FitzRoy's grave

- Ira Aldridge (1807–1867), American and British playwright and mainly Shakespearean actor lived at 5 Hamlet Road from 1861 to 1862 with his wife Margaret Gill. A blue plaque unveiled in 2007 commemorates Aldridge as the "African Roscius".
- Thomas Attwood (1765–1838), pupil of Mozart and organist at St Paul's Cathedral, lived in Roselawn, a large house on Beulah Hill near the junction with Hermitage Road. He played host to the composer Felix Mendelssohn in 1829 and 1832.
- Admiral Sir Robert Lambert Baynes KCB (1796–1869), Royal Navy officer; Commander-in-Chief, Pacific Station; credited with adopting a policy of non-intervention that helped defuse the San Juan Boundary Dispute of 1859 between Britain and the United States of America.
- Raymond Chandler (1888–1959), the author of American noir detective novels lived as a boy in the area especially at Mount Cyra, 110, Auckland Road, from 1900 to 1905. The house now has a Blue Plaque.
- Sir John Ninian Comper (1864–1960), one of the great Gothic Revival architects of the 20th century, lived at The Priory, 67 Beulah Hill (now demolished). His son Nicholas Comper (1897–1939) was an aviator who designed the Comper Swift monoplane in the back garden.
- Edward Elgar (1857–1934), composer, and his wife Caroline Alice Elgar (1848–1920) lived at Oaklands, Fountain Road in 1889, soon after they were married, so that they could be near the Crystal Palace Concerts.
- Bernard Fagg (1915–1987), archaeologist and museum curator, was born in Upper Norwood.
- Robert FitzRoy (1805–1865), captain of HMS Beagle, second governor of New Zealand, and inventor of the weather forecast, lived during the last years of his life at Lyndhurst House, 140 Church Road and is buried in front of All Saints' Church.
- Sir Theodore Ford (1829–1920), chief justice of the Straits Settlements, lived in Upper Norwood from his retirement in 1896 to his death in 1920.
- Walter Franklin (1891–1968), first-class cricketer, who played for the MCC.
- Simon Friend, multi-instrumentalist in the alternative rock band The Levellers founded in 1988.
- Benjamin Waterhouse Hawkins (1807–1894), sculptor of the famous dinosaurs in the park, lived at Fossil Villa, 22 Belvedere Road.
- Anthony Ludovici (1882–1971), philosopher, and his wife the writer Elsie Finnimore Buckley (1882–1959) lived at 35 Central Hill, soon after they were married in 1920.
- G. E. Moore (1873–1958), philosopher, who was the father (with Bertrand Russell) of analytic philosophy.
- Mary Nesbitt (1742/3–1825), an 18th-century courtesan who became involved in political intrigue, lived at Norwood House off Central Hill. The house is now part of The Cedars School and The Laurels School.
- Charles Patteson (1891–1957), clergyman, first-class cricketer and international hockey player.
- Joseph Paxton (1803–1865), famed designer of the Crystal Palace, lived in a house called Rockhills at the top of Westwood Hill.
- Camille Pissarro (1830–1903), the impressionist painter, moved with his family to the area upon the outbreak of the Franco-Prussian War.
- Troy Southgate (b.1965), far-right political activist, lived in Gipsy Hill and grew up on the Central Hill Estate.
- Charles Spurgeon (1834–1892) highly influential English Particular Baptist minister known as the Prince of Preachers was Pastor of Metropolitan Tabernacle from 1854 to 1892 and lived in Upper Norwood at Westwood on Beulah Hill from 1880 until his death. The namesake of Spurgeon Road.
- Charlotte Carmichael Stopes (1840–1929), suffragette and Shakespearean scholar, organized cultural groups in Upper Norwood in the 1880s.
- Marie Stopes (1880–1958), daughter of the above, a botanist and birth-control advocate who opened the first birth control clinic in Britain.
- Sir William Treloar (1843–1923), a Sheriff and Lord Mayor of London lived at Grange Mount, a house situated at the junction of Grange Road and Beulah Hill.
- Sir Francis Wyatt Truscott (1824–1895), Lord Mayor of London 1879–1880, lived at Essex Lodge on Central Hill.
- Sir George Wyatt Truscott (1857–1941), son of the above, also Lord Mayor of London 1908–1909, lived at Emilena House, Central Hill.
- Émile Zola (1840–1902), French novelist, lived in exile at the Queen's Hotel on Church Road, here from October 1898 to June 1899.

== Nearest places ==
- Anerley
- Croydon
- Crystal Palace
- Dulwich
- Elmers End
- Gipsy Hill
- Norbury
- Penge
- Streatham
- Streatham Common
- Selhurst
- South Norwood
- Sydenham
- Tulse Hill
- Thornton Heath
- West Norwood

== Nearest stations ==
- Crystal Palace railway station (East London Line services from 2010)
- Gipsy Hill railway station
- West Norwood railway station
- Norwood Junction railway station
- Thornton Heath railway station
