= Harris =

Harris may refer to:

== Places ==
=== Canada ===
- Harris, Ontario
- Northland Pyrite Mine (also known as Harris Mine)
- Harris, Saskatchewan
- Rural Municipality of Harris No. 316, Saskatchewan

=== Scotland ===
- Harris, Outer Hebrides (sometimes called the Isle of Harris), part of Lewis and Harris, Outer Hebrides
- Harris, Rùm, a place on Rùm, Highland

=== United States ===
- Harris, Indiana
- Harris, Iowa
- Harris, Kansas
- Harris Township, Michigan
- Harris, Minnesota
- Harris, Missouri
- Harris, New York
- Harris, North Carolina
- Harris, Wisconsin

=== Elsewhere ===
- Harris, Montserrat

=== Other places with "Harris" in the name ===
- Harrisonburg, Louisiana
- Harrisonburg, Virginia
- Harris County (disambiguation)
- Harris Lake (disambiguation)
- Harris Mountain (disambiguation)
- Harris Township (disambiguation)
- Harrisburg (disambiguation)
- Harrison (disambiguation)
- Harrisville (disambiguation)

== People ==
- Kamala Harris, 49th vice president of the United States from 2021 to 2025, and candidate in the 2024 presidential election
- Harris (given name), including a list of people with the given name
- Harris (surname), a family last name
  - List of people with surname Harris

== Music ==
- Harris (band), an American rock band

== Titles ==
- Baron Harris, a title in the Peerage of the United Kingdom, created in 1815 for General Sir George Harris
- Harris baronets, any of four Baronetcies created for persons with the surname Harris, two in the Baronetage of England and two in the Baronetage of the United Kingdom
- Harris is also the surname of the Earls of Malmesbury in the Peerage of Great Britain, created in 1800 for diplomat Sir James Harris

== Buildings ==
- Harris Building (disambiguation)
- Harris Museum, Preston, Lancashire, England
- Harris Theater (Chicago), United States
- Harris Theater (Pittsburgh), United States
- Harris & Ewing Photographic Studio, Washington, D.C., United States

== Companies ==
- BMO Harris Bank, an American subsidiary of Bank of Montreal
- Harris Associates, an American investment company
- Harris Company, operators of a defunct American department store chain
- Harris Corporation, an American defense contractor (now L3Harris)
- Harris Farm Markets, an Australian grocery chain
- Harris Interactive, an American market research company
- Harris Performance Products, an English motorcycle racing manufacturer
- Harris Publications, an American comic and magazine publishing company
- Harris Ranch, an American beef producer

== Education ==
=== United Kingdom ===
- Harris Academy, a secondary school in Dundee, Scotland
- Harris Church of England Academy, a secondary school in Rugby, England
- Harris Federation, a federation of secondary school academies in South London, England. Consisting of the following schools:
  - Harris Academy Bermondsey
  - Harris Academy Chafford Hundred
  - Harris City Academy Crystal Palace, the flagship academy of the Federation
  - Harris Girls' Academy East Dulwich
  - Harris Boys' Academy East Dulwich
  - Harris Academy Falconwood
  - Harris Academy Merton
  - Harris Academy Peckham
  - Harris Academy Purley
  - Harris Academy South Norwood

=== United States ===
- Harris–Stowe State University, Missouri

== Other uses ==
- Harris affine region detector, an algorithm
- Harris energy functional, an approximation named after J. Harris (physicist) which is used in density functional theory of quantum mechanics
- Harris's hawk, Parabuteo unicinctus, a bird of prey
- Harris operator, a corner detection algorithm
- Harris (train), a type of train on the Melbourne metropolitan railway
- Harris City (disambiguation)
- Harris Tweed (disambiguation)
- Mrs. Harris, a 2005 television film

== See also ==
- Haris (disambiguation)
- Harish (disambiguation)
- Harries, a surname
- Justice Harris (disambiguation)
