= Harrisburg (disambiguation) =

Harrisburg usually refers to the city of Harrisburg, Pennsylvania, in the United States, which is the capital of the state of Pennsylvania.

Harrisburg may also refer to:

- Harrisburg, Arkansas
- Harrisburg, Inyo County, California
- Harrisburg, Illinois
- Harrisburg, Indiana
- Harrisburg, Mississippi, town burned in the Civil War battle of Tupelo
- Harrisburg, Missouri
- Harrisburg, Nebraska
- Harrisburg, New York, town in Lewis County
- Harrisburg, Cattaraugus County, New York, hamlet in Allegany (town), New York
- Harrisburg, Warren County, New York, hamlet in town of Stony Creek, New York
- Harrisburg, North Carolina
- Harrisburg, Ohio, a village in Franklin and Pickaway counties
- Harrisburg, Gallia County, Ohio
- Harrisburg, Stark County, Ohio
- Harrisburg, Oregon
- Harrisburg, South Dakota
- Harrisburg, Houston, former city in Texas
- Harrisburg, Utah, a ghost town
- Harrisburg, Virginia
- Harrisburg, a song by Midnight Oil from their 1984 album Red Sails in the Sunset

== See also ==
- Harrisburg School District (Pennsylvania)
- Harrisburg University of Science and Technology
- Harris (disambiguation)
- Harrisville (disambiguation)
- Harrisonburg
- USS Harrisburg (disambiguation)
- USS Harrisburg (LPD-30), a San Antonio-class amphibious transport dock ship
