= Soay =

Soay (pronounced "soy") is the name of several Scottish islands. It is Sòdhaigh (sometimes anglicised "Soaigh") in Scottish Gaelic, and comes from the Old Norse so-ey meaning "island of sheep". It may refer to:

- Soay, Inner Hebrides off south west Skye
- Soay, St Kilda in the St Kilda group
- The neighbouring islands of Soay Mòr and Soay Beag in the Outer Hebrides

It may also refer to:

- Soay sheep the native, primitive sheep from St Kilda

== See also ==
- Soa Island, south of Iona, Scotland
