= Harris School =

Harris School may refer to:

- Harris School of Public Policy Studies at the University of Chicago, Chicago, Illinois, United States
- Harris Church of England Academy, Rugby, Warwickshire, England
- Harris School of Business, United States
- The Harris School (Texas)
