= Linkville =

Linkville may refer to:

- Linkville, Indiana, an unincorporated community
- Linkville, Kansas City, a neighborhood of Kansas City
