= Meleeka Clary =

American clinical psychologist

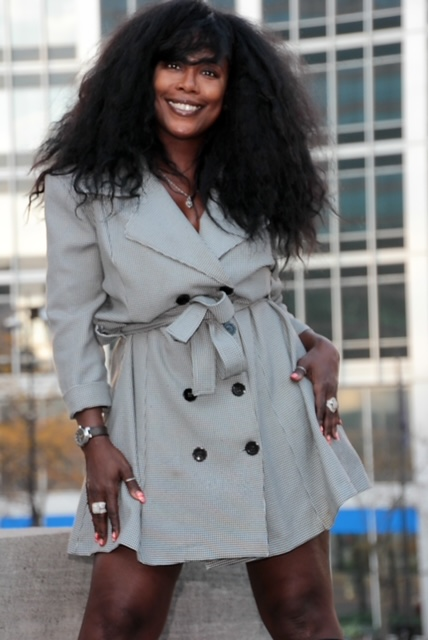
- Born: October 14, 1973 (age 52); Boston, Massachusetts, U.S.
- Education: BA and MA in criminal justice, paralegal, PhD in clinical psychology
- Occupations: Director, writer, actress, clinical psychologist
- Website: drmeleekaclary.com

Meleeka Clary (born October 14, 1973) is an American clinical psychologist, paralegal, model, actor, and director of Three Corners of Deception.

Clary has won several accolades and awards, including Best Human Rights Director at the Toronto International Women's Film Festival.

As an actor, she has been featured in television commercials, programs, public announcements, and shows. She has acted in projects including Eclipse: The Rise of Ink, Nashville, Bittersweet, Greenleaf, and The Resident.

== Early life and education ==
Clary was born on October 14, 1973, in Boston, Massachusetts, to Andrew Lee Clary and Larriana Clary. At age 8, she was enrolled in Vicki's School of Dancing and Acting.

In 2000, she received her bachelor's degree in criminal justice, followed by a master's degree in the same field from Curry University in 2004. In the following year, she also earned a para-legal degree from Northeastern University. Then in 2008, Clary started her PhD in clinical psychology at Walden University and completed it in 2021.

== Career ==
Clary started her professional career in 1998 as an office manager at Alternative Solutions. Initially, she was hired as a paralegal at the William/Rangulong Law Office, which is located in Malden.

After completing her bachelor's degree, Clary pursued a career in counseling and began working at Hilderbrand Shelter as a counselor, providing support to individuals affected by domestic violence, drug addiction, and HIV. She has also held counseling positions at other institutes, such as Inn Transition Shelter and Meaningful Days Services.

In 2005, Clary became an instructor at Premier Education Group (Salter School), where she educated career students that were pursuing higher education levels in the medical field. In her career, Clary has also been an instructor at Lincoln Tech Career Institute, ITT Technical Institute, and Ivy Tech Community College of Indiana. Currently Clary is serving as a clinical psychologist at HMWP Psychology Counselling.

=== Entertainment career ===
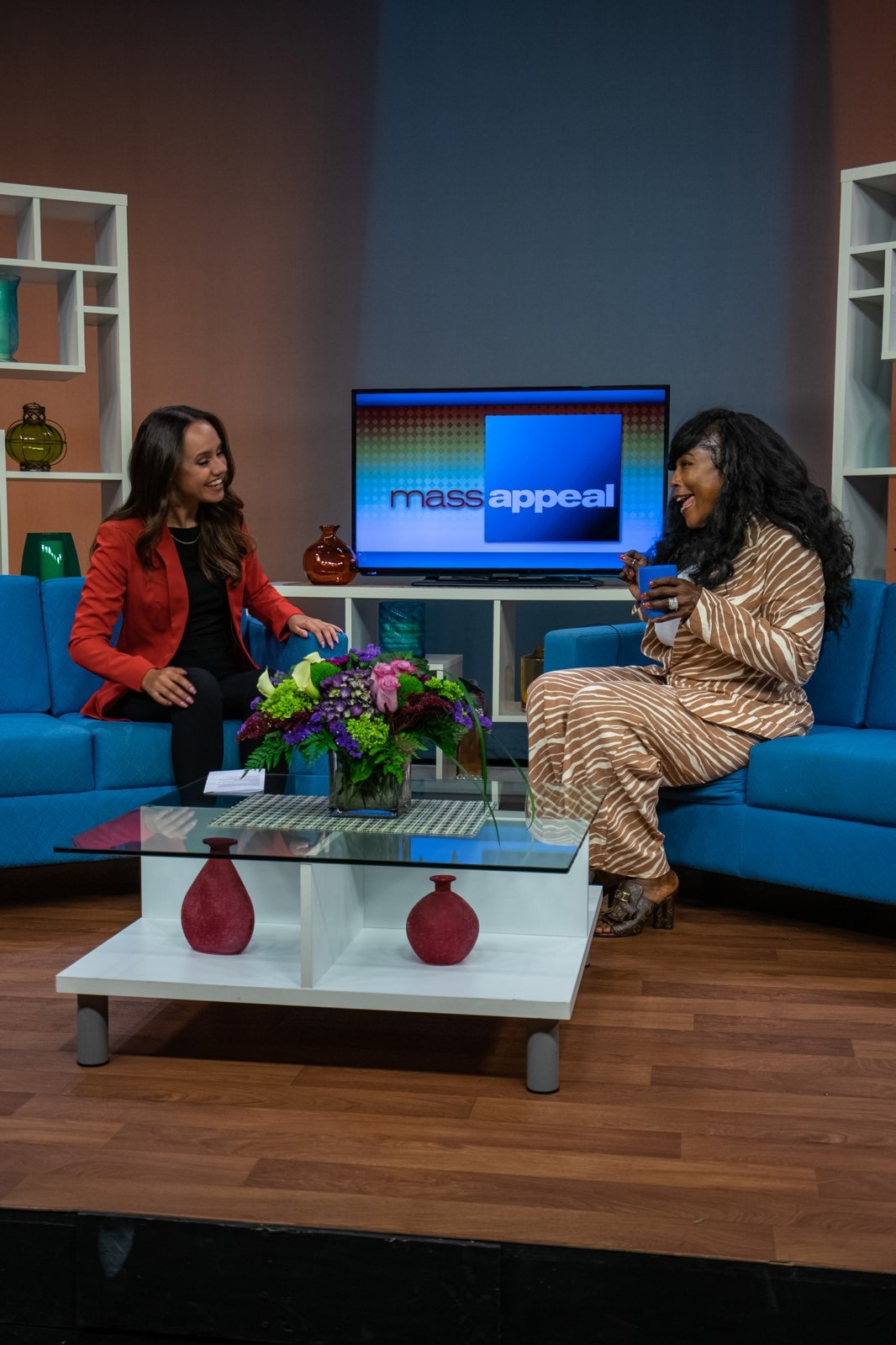
Meleeka at Mass Appeal

In 1985, she participated in a Franklin Park Young and Youths Organization fashion show for children and recited drama poems, including "How can I go on, and Where can I find Light."

In 1991, Clary participated as a mentor and choreographer in Wipe Out Drug Abuse (WODA). Then in 1994, she joined Black Essence, a group of young inner-city youths role-playing against violence. She was the lead actress in an original play, When Your Sons Don’t Come Home And Why me.

Clary has appeared on TV shows for dialogue and public service announcements against teenage pregnancy. In 2016, Clary acted in Dr. Bird's Advice for Sad Poets as Kwame's Mother.

She also appeared on TV shows Greenleaf, Nashville, and The Resident.

In 2021, Clary made her directorial debut with Three Corners of Deception, based on her own story of the divorce and custody battle of their son that she had with her husband in an Indiana court and lost.

== Accolades ==
Clary has won several accolades and awards for Three Corners of Deception, including Best Human Rights Director at the Toronto International Women Film Festival, Best Female Director at Toronto International Women Film Festival, Best Female Director at San Francisco Indie Short Festival, Best Female Director winner at the Toronto International Women Film Festival, Best Actress at Festival Award at Global Film Festival LA, and director honors at the Red River Film Festival. The film was also screened at Berlin International Art Film Festival, Best Feature Film at Paris International Women Festival, Festival Award at Medusa Film Festival, Indian Indie Award, and Festival Award at Global Film Festival LA.

== Filmography ==
Year	Title	Role	Credit
2016	Dr. Bird's Advice for sad Poets	Kwame Mother	Actress
2018	Eclipse: The Rise of Ink	Party guest 1	Actress
2018	Nashville	Nurse	Actress
2018	Greenleaf	Chorus member	Actress
2018	The Resident	Hospital visitor	Actress
2018	Bittersweet	Aisha's mom	Actress
2019	Willpower	Fantasy	Actress
2020	Willpower (TV Show)	Fantasy	Actress
2021	Genius	Church congregation	Actress
2021	Three Corners of Deception	Dr. Meleeka Clary-Ghosh	Writer, director
2021	Heels	Arena Crowd	Actress
