= North Township, Indiana =

North Township may refer to the following places in Indiana:

- North Township, Lake County, Indiana
- North Township, Marshall County, Indiana

See also

- North Township (disambiguation)
