= Soay Sound =

Strait in Scotland

Coordinates: 57.9473°N 6.9658°W

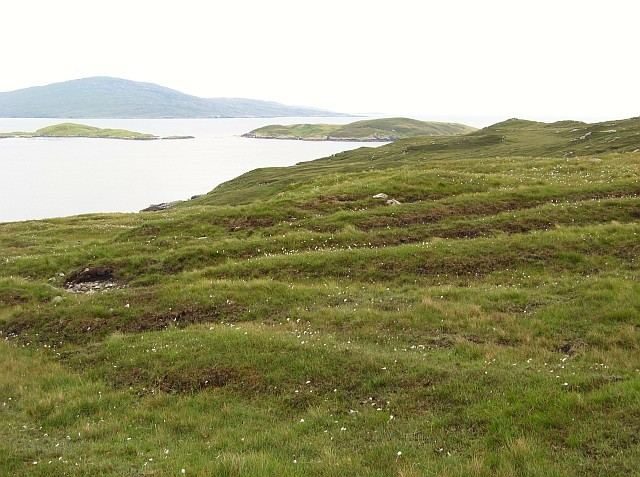
Looking across the Soay Sound from North Harris Soay Mòr and Soay Beag lie in the Sound

Soay Sound (Scottish Gaelic: Caolas Shòdhaigh) is a strait separating the islands of Soay Mòr and Soay Beag from the northern part of Harris. The sound is part of West Loch Tarbert.
