= Harrisburgh =

Harrisburgh may refer to a location in the United States:

- Harrisburgh, California
- Harrisburg, New York
- Harrisburg, Texas
- Harrisburg, Pennsylvania

== See also ==
- Harrisburg (disambiguation)
