= Yeagley =

Yeagley is a surname. It may refer to:

- David Yeagley (1951–2014), American Comanche, classical composer, conservative political writer and activist
- Donald Yeagley (1920-2020), American politician and labor union activist
- J. Walter Yeagley (1909–1990), American judge
- Jerry Yeagley (born 1940), American soccer player and coach
- Susan Yeagley (born 1972), American actress
- Todd Yeagley, American soccer player
