= USNS Harris County =

1944 LST-542-class tank landing ship

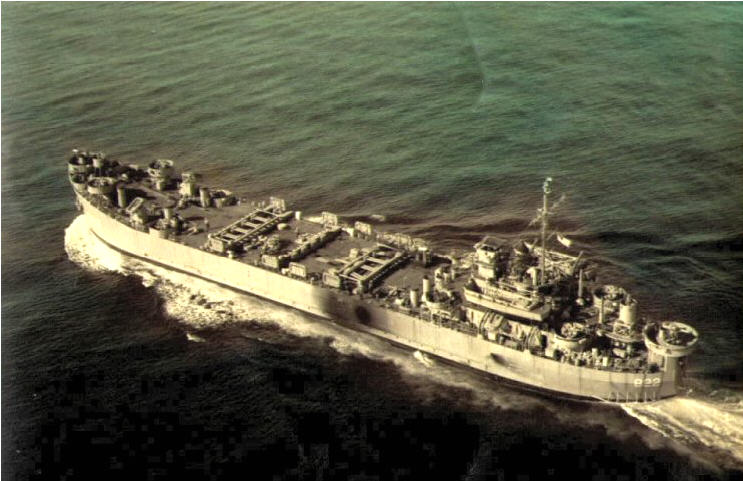

History

United States
- Name: USS LST-822
- Namesake: Harris County
- Builder: Missouri Valley Bridge & Iron Company, Evansville, Indiana
- Laid down: 20 September 1944
- Launched: 1 November 1944
- Commissioned: 23 November 1944
- Decommissioned: 27 July 1946
- Recommissioned: 23 November 1950
- Decommissioned: 21 February 1955
- In service: March 1955
- Renamed: USNS Harris County (T-LST-822), 1 July 1955
- Honours and awards: 1 battle star (World War II); 4 battle stars (Korea)
- Fate: Sold to the Philippines, 13 September 1976

Philippines
- Name: RPS Aurora (LT-508)
- Acquired: 13 September 1976
- Fate: Unknown, probably sold for scrap

General characteristics
- Class & type: LST-542-class tank landing ship
- Displacement: 1,625 long tons (1,651 t) light; 3,640 long tons (3,698 t) full
- Length: 328 ft (100 m)
- Beam: 50 ft (15 m)
- Draft: Unloaded : 2 ft 4 in (0.71 m) forward; 7 ft 6 in (2.29 m) aft; Loaded : 8 ft 2 in (2.49 m) forward; 14 ft 1 in (4.29 m) aft
- Propulsion: 2 × General Motors 12-567 diesel engines, two shafts, twin rudders
- Speed: 12 knots (22 km/h; 14 mph)
- Boats & landing craft carried: Two LCVPs
- Troops: approx. 130 officers and enlisted
- Complement: 8–10 officers, 89–100 enlisted men
- Armament: 1 × single 3"/50 caliber gun; 8 × 40 mm guns; 12 × 20 mm guns

USNS Harris County (T-LST-822) was an LST-542-class tank landing ship built for the United States Navy during World War II. Named for counties in Georgia and Texas, she was the only U.S. Naval vessel to bear the name.

USS LST-822 was laid down by the Missouri Valley Bridge & Iron Company of Evansville, Indiana on 20 September 1944; launched on 1 November 1944; and commissioned at New Orleans, Louisiana on 23 November 1944.

== Service history ==
=== World War II, 1944–1946 ===
After shakedown off the Florida coast, LST-822 departed New Orleans for the Pacific on 27 December. Steaming via San Diego and San Francisco, she reached Pearl Harbor on 6 February 1945. After a month of training in Hawaiian waters, she sailed on 15 March with Army troops and equipment embarked. She touched Eniwetok on 27 March, then arrived Ulithi on 7 April to prepare for participation in the battle of Okinawa, begun a week earlier. Departing 12 April, she approached the shore of Okinawa on 18 April; and, during bitter fighting ashore and frequent Japanese air attacks, she operated between Okinawa and islands to the west. On 22 April she discharged men and equipment at Ie Shima while protected by smoke cover. During her three weeks at Okinawa she survived 18 enemy air raids and carried vitally needed supplies for ground forces.

LST-822 departed Okinawa on 11 May, reached Saipan the 18th, and sailed for the Philippines on 6 June. Arriving Leyte on 11 June, she proceeded to Biak where she arrived the 18th and embarked troops for transfer to Okinawa. Steaming via Leyte, she reached Naha, Okinawa, on 4 July. There she embarked troops of the 108th Armored Tank Battalion and sailed on 6 July for Cebu, Philippines. She arrived on 17 July, embarked troop replacements at Subic Bay, then returned to the Ryukyus, arriving Ie Shima on 7 August.

Following the surrender of Japan, she returned to the Philippines to transport occupation troops and equipment to Japan. As part of a 120-ship convoy, she departed Lingayen Gulf on 17 September and arrived off Wakayama, Japan, on the 25th. After unloading equipment and debarking Army engineers, she sailed on 1 October for Manila. Between 19 and 27 October, she carried additional occupation troops from Lingayen Gulf to Wakayama; and during the next four months, she supported occupation landings and Allied operations along the coast of Japan.

Departing Sasebo on 3 March 1946, LST-822 sailed for the United States where she arrived San Diego on 30 March. After operating along the West Coast from Southern California to Washington, she entered drydock at Portland, Oregon on 28 May. She decommissioned on 27 July and entered the Pacific Reserve Fleet on 10 August.

=== Korean War, 1950–1953 ===
LST-822 recommissioned at Bremerton, Washington on 23 November 1950. In response to the invasion of South Korea, she departed Long Beach, California on 10 February 1951 for the Far East. Steaming via Pearl Harbor, she arrived Yokosuka, Japan on 23 March. During the next four months she operated between Japan and the western coast of Korea, supporting amphibious operations and bolstering American military operations. She departed Yokosuka on 20 July, arrived San Diego on 9 August, and spent the next nine months participating in amphibious training along the West Coast. LST-822 departed San Diego on 9 April 1952 and again deployed to the Far East, arriving Yokosuka via Pearl Harbor on 18 May. Operating out of Yokosuka and Sasebo, she steamed to ports along the coast of Korea from Inchon and Koje Do to Pusan and Pohang. She transferred men and supplies between Japan and South Korea and later in the year and into 1953 shuttled North Korean prisoners of war during prisoner exchanges. Departing Inchon on 22 January 1953, she sailed via Sasebo to Yokosuka, then departed for the West Coast on 5 February. She arrived San Diego on 5 March and resumed amphibious training, which continued during the remainder of the year.

=== Vietnam, 1954 ===
LST-822 departed San Diego on 25 January 1954 for the Western Pacific. Arriving Yokosuka on 25 February, she resumed supply duty in support of US forces in the Far East, and during the next five months steamed to Korea, Okinawa, and along the coast of Japan. On 11 August she departed Yokosuka for Haiphong, North Vietnam where she arrived on 26 August. There she joined "Operation Passage to Freedom", which provided citizens of North Vietnam an opportunity to escape the Communist takeover and to emigrate to South Vietnam. She took part in the evacuation of almost 300,000 Vietnamese from North to South. Between 29 August and 2 October she carried refugees, cargo, and military equipment from Haiphong to Nha Trang, South Vietnam. After returning to Japan on 28 October, LST-822 departed Yokosuka on 17 November, touched Pearl Harbor on 5 December, and reached San Diego on 20 December.

=== Arctic operations, 1955–1956 ===
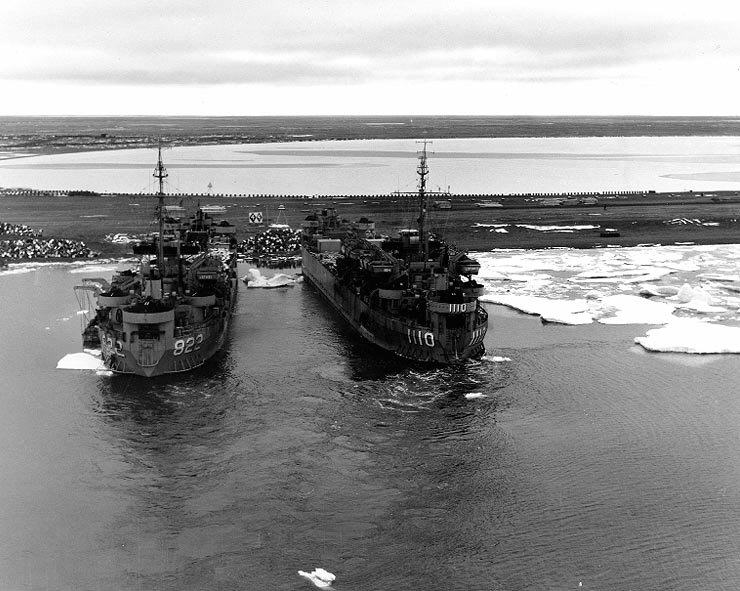
USNS Harris County (T-LST-822) and San Bernardino County (LST-1110) unloading over the beach at Point Barrow, Alaska, during DEW Line support operations, 16 September 1955

LST-822 operated along the West Coast until 27 June 1955 when she sailed for operations in the Arctic Ocean off Alaska. Renamed USNS Harris County (T-LST-822) on 1 July, she steamed via Seattle, Washington and reached Point Hope, Alaska on 27 July. For almost two months she conducted supply and survey operations in the ice-filled Arctic Ocean north of Alaska. Departing Point Hope on 19 September, she sailed to San Diego and arrived on 8 October. She returned to Seattle late in October and from 1 December to 20 January 1956 underwent extensive overhaul. Departing Seattle on 27 January, she carried cargo to San Francisco on 31 January. Harris County was placed in service in reserve on 21 February at Mare Island, California and she entered the Pacific Reserve Fleet. In March she transferred to the Military Sea Transportation Service (MSTS).

=== Pacific Ocean operations, 1955–1976 ===
Crewed by civilians, Harris County continued operating along the coast of Alaska and into the southern reaches of the Arctic Ocean. She operated out of ports in California and Washington as a supply and replenishment ship between 1956 and 1962. On 14 January 1962 she departed Seattle for the mid-Pacific. Steaming via Seward, Alaska she arrived Pearl Harbor on 12 February to begin duty as a survey support ship. Thereafter Harris County operated throughout the Pacific from Hawaii to New Guinea while carrying supplies and supporting ocean survey projects. Her duties carried her to eastern New Guinea, the Marshalls, the Marianas, and the Line Islands of Polynesia.

Subsequently, placed out of service and struck from the Naval Vessel Register, the ship was sold to the Philippines on 13 September 1976.

=== As Philippine Navy ship Aurora ===
The ship was sold to the Philippines on 13 September 1976, and was renamed RPS Aurora (LT-508), and in July 1980 as BRP Aurora (LT-508). She served the Philippine Navy until she was decommissioned and stricken by the end of the 1980s. Her final fate is unknown, although probably she was sold for scrap.

== Awards ==
Harris County received one battle star for World War II and four battle stars for Korean War service.
