= USS San Bernardino County =

LST-542-class tank landing ship

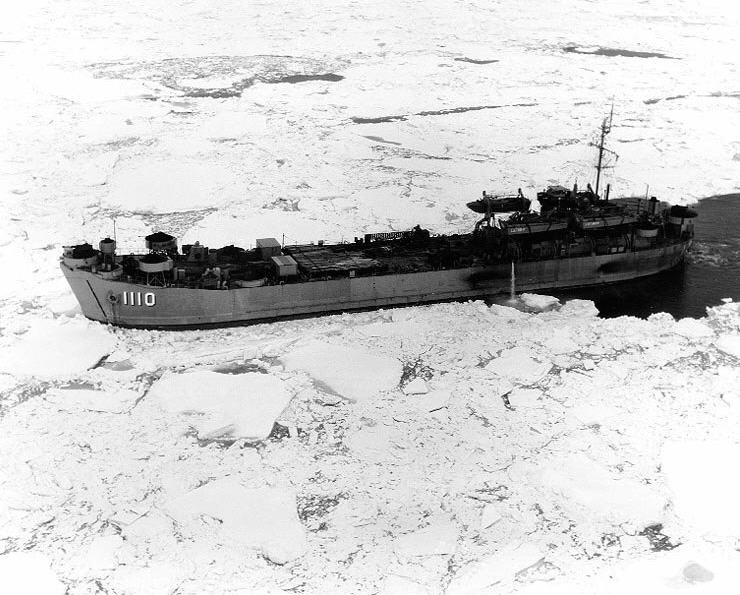
- USS San Bernardino County (LST-1110) underway in a consolidated ice belt, northeast of Point Barrow, Alaska, during "DEW Line" support operations, 11 September 1955

History

United States
- Name: LST-1110
- Builder: Missouri Valley Bridge & Iron Company, Evansville
- Laid down: 28 December 1944
- Launched: 9 February 1945
- Sponsored by: Mrs. Walter H. Baumberger
- Commissioned: 1 March 1945
- Renamed: San Bernardino County, 1 July 1955
- Namesake: San Bernardino County
- Decommissioned: 15 August 1958
- Stricken: 6 February 1959
- Identification: Callsign: NBAI; Hull number: LST-1110
- Honors and awards: See Awards
- Fate: Sold to the Republic of China, 16 August 1958

History

Taiwan
- Name: Chung Chiang; (中強)
- Acquired: 15 August 1958
- Commissioned: 15 August 1958
- Decommissioned: 1993
- Identification: Hull number: LST-225

General characteristics
- Class & type: LST-542-class tank landing ship
- Displacement: 1,625 long tons (1,651 t) light; 4,080 long tons (4,145 t) full
- Length: 328 ft (100 m)
- Beam: 50 ft (15 m)
- Draft: Unloaded : 2 ft 4 in (0.71 m) forward; 7 ft 6 in (2.29 m) aft; Loaded : 8 ft 2 in (2.49 m) forward; 14 ft 1 in (4.29 m) aft
- Propulsion: 2 × General Motors 12-567 diesel engines, two shafts, twin rudders
- Speed: 12 knots (22 km/h; 14 mph)
- Boats & landing craft carried: 4 × LCVPs
- Troops: 16 officers, 147 enlisted men
- Complement: 7 officers, 104 enlisted men
- Armament: 2 × twin 40 mm guns w/Mk.51 directors; 4 × single 40 mm guns; 12 × single 20 mm guns

USS San Bernardino County (LST–1110) was an LST-542-class tank landing ship built for the United States Navy during World War II. Named for San Bernardino County, California, she was the only U.S. Naval vessel to bear the name.

== Construction and career ==
LST-1110 was laid down on 28 December 1944 by the Missouri Valley Bridge and Iron Company of Evansville, Indiana; launched on 9 February 1945, sponsored by Mrs. Sidney Kolb; placed in reduced commission for transit to New Orleans on 1 March 1945; and commissioned in full on 7 March 1945.

=== Service in the United States Navy ===
==== World War II, 1945 ====
Following shakedown off Florida, LST-1110 loaded creosote, piles, asphalt, and an LCT and departed New Orleans for Pearl Harbor on 15 April. From Oahu, she carried her cargo on to the Marianas; offloaded the piles and asphalt at Guam; took on gasoline drums at Saipan; and, on 20 June, sailed for Okinawa. She offloaded her cargo onto the Hagushi beaches and embarked elements of the 6th Marines between 26 June and 10 July; then sailed back to Guam, where she discharged her passengers. Availability at Saipan followed; and, at the end of the month, she moved on to the Solomons to load cargo for the Philippines.

==== Post-war activities, 1945 ====
The war ended on 15 August; and, four days later, LST-1110 departed Guadalcanal. On the 30th, she anchored off Calicoan Island and completed offloading by 11 September. The LST then shifted to San Pedro Bay, whence she proceeded to Lingayen Gulf to join Amphibious Group 8 to participate in the occupation of eastern Honshū. Departing Luzon on 26 September, LST-1110 disembarked elements of the 8th Field Artillery, 25th Division, I Army Corps, at Nagoya on 25 and 26 October; then got underway to return to Lingayen Gulf. In November, she transported Quartermaster Corps personnel to Sasebo, then sailed east. On the 27th, she arrived at Iwo Jima; embarked 20th Air Force personnel; and continued on to Saipan where she discharged her passengers on 5 December. LST-1110 remained at Saipan through December; and, on 8 January 1946, she sailed for Pearl Harbor and the California coast.

==== 1946–1953 ====
Arriving at San Pedro on 11 February 1946, she underwent overhaul at Long Beach; and, in June, proceeded to San Diego where she reported to ComPhibPac for duty. For the next two years, she provided amphibious training and logistic support services along the West Coast.

Then, in the summer of 1948, she commenced the first of many Arctic logistic support missions. She departed Port Hueneme on 25 June; proceeded to San Francisco, whence she continued north, with Summit County (LST-1146), to Seattle and Alaskan points. Later joined by the ice breaker, USS Burton Island, she reached Nome on the 29th; and, on the 31st, moved on to other northern stations: Point Lay, Barter Island, and Point Barrow. In mid-August, she began to move south again and arrived at Long Beach on the 28th. On 16 September, she returned to San Diego and resumed amphibious training and logistics operations along the California coast. For the next five years, she maintained a similar schedule, operating in the arctic during the summer and off California for the remainder of each year.

==== 1953–1957 ====
In the fall of 1953, LST-1110 was dispatched to Hawaii for winter training exercises. In February 1953, she returned to San Diego; and, in September, she sailed west again for her first peacetime deployment to the Far East. Departing San Diego on the 20th, she arrived at Yokosuka, Japan on 22 October and began six months of cargo operations and training exercises in Japanese and Korean waters. On 12 April 1955 she departed Inchon for home and arrived at San Diego on the 28th. At the end of June, LST-1110 resumed Arctic resupply operations; and, on 1 July, while deployed, she was named USS San Bernardino County.

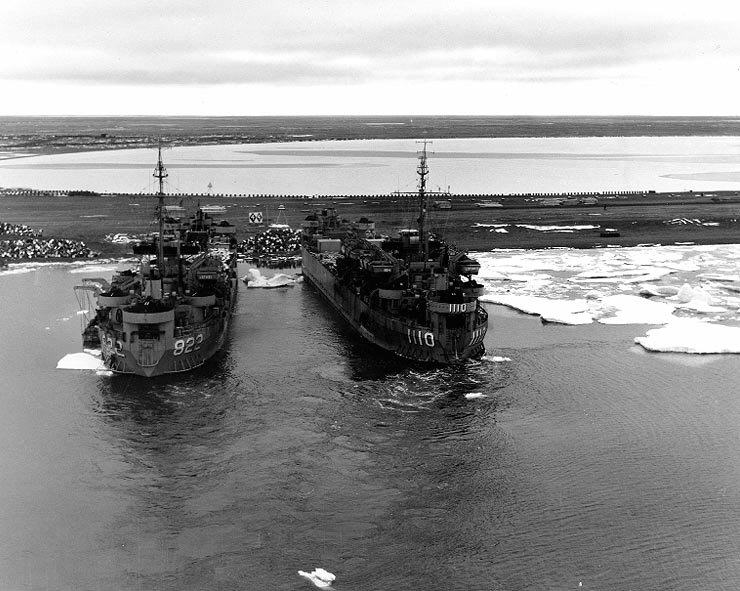
USNS Harris County (T-LST-822) and USS San Bernardino County (LST-1110) unloading over the beach at Point Barrow, Alaska, during "DEW" Line support operations, 16 September 1955.

She returned to Southern California in October and remained there until February 1956, when she was transferred to Pearl Harbor. She arrived at her new home port on 2 March, conducted operations from there through May; but, in June, she again sailed north. Her reassignment to Pearl Harbor did not change her summer deployments; and, in that year and in 1957, she carried supplies to Arctic bases. On 13 September 1957, she completed her last Alaskan mission.

USS San Bernardino County was struck from the Naval Vessel Register on 6 February 1959.

=== Service in the Republic of China Navy ===
On 31 December 1957, she was placed in commission, in reserve; and, on 15 August 1958 she was decommissioned for transfer to the Republic of China in Pearl Harbor, Hawaii, and was transferred to Republic of China for use in accordance with the Sino-US Mutual Defense Treaty. The handover ceremony was donated by Major General Solomon, Commander of the 14th Military Region of the United States, and received by the representative of Colonel Zheng Tianjie, the military attache in the United States.

She was commissioned on 15 August 1958 as Chung Chiang (LST-225).

The ship has participated in the replenishment mission to the Kinmen Outer Island during the 823 artillery battle. In the fierce fire of the Communist army, thanks to the cooperation of all officers and soldiers of the ship, the excellent craftsmanship, shuttle and replenishment, successfully fulfilled the mission.

Due to the gradual decline in transportation and replenishment tasks, her and other LSTs were ordered to be simply mothballed on 27 January 1989.

Chung Chiang was discarded by the Republic of China in 1993, her final fate unknown.

== Awards ==
LST-1110 received one battle star for World War II service.
