= Harris & Ewing =

Photographic studio in Washington, D.C., United States

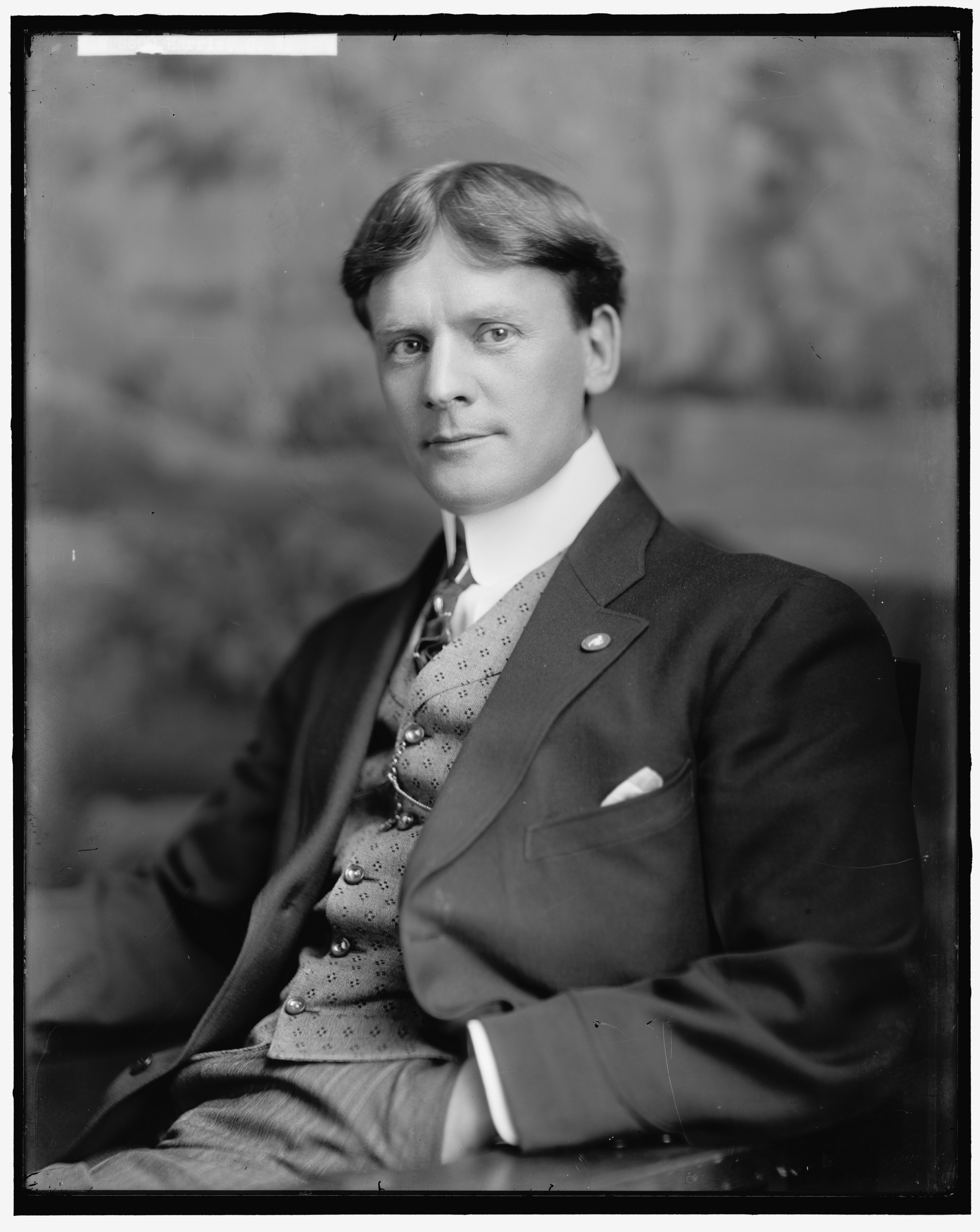
George W. Harris

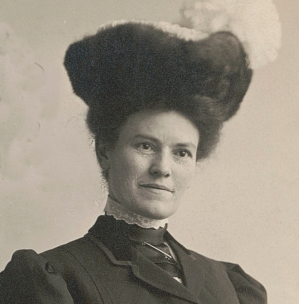
Martha Ewing

Harris & Ewing Inc. was a photographic studio in Washington, D.C. established by George W. Harris and Martha Ewing. As a full service studio, it did portraits and also had a news photo service. Various museums and the Library of Congress have collections of their photographs.

== History ==
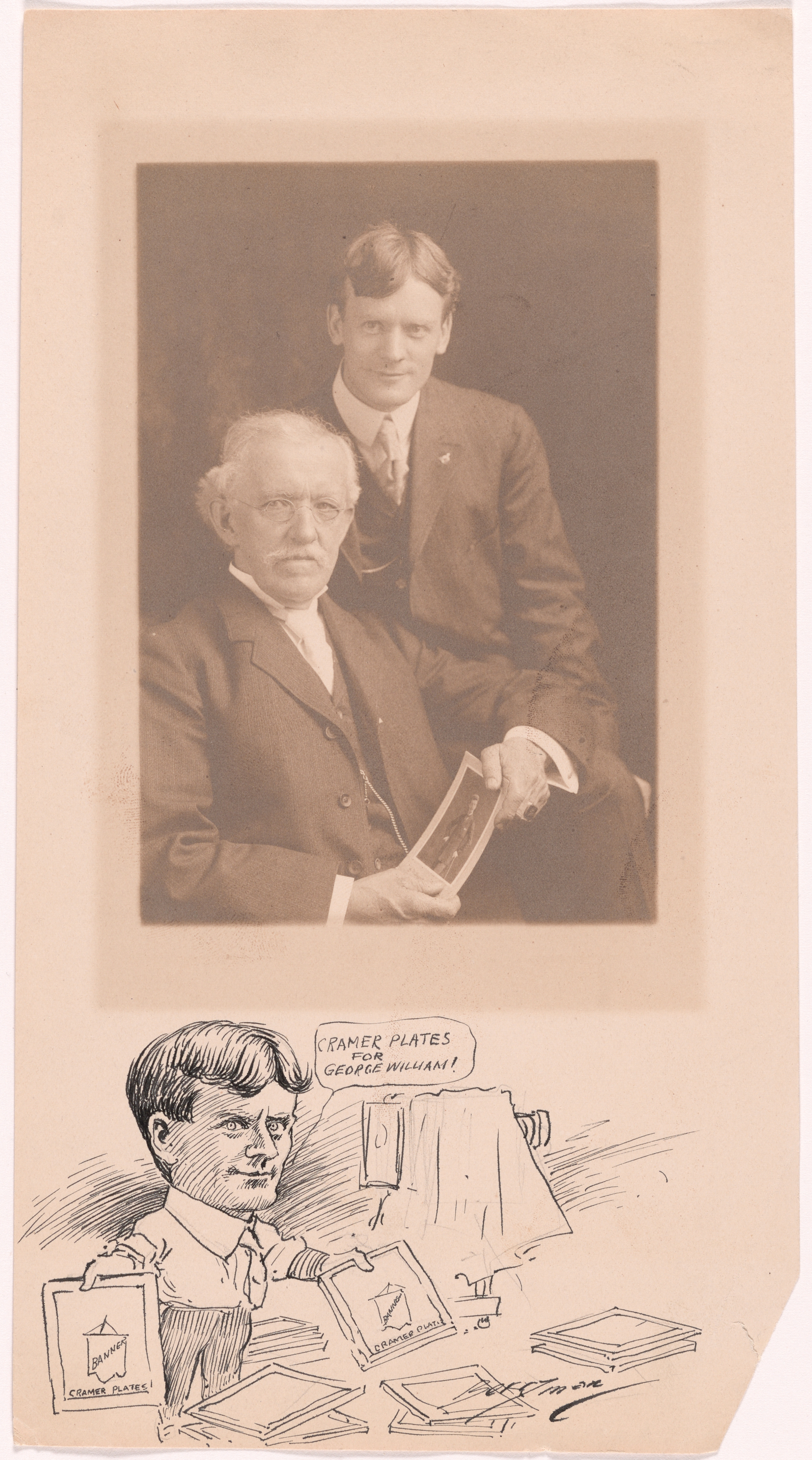
Gustav Cramer (German-American photographer, 1838-1914) and George William Harris, c. 1908

As a rookie news photographer, G. W. Harris covered the Johnstown flood of 1889 in Pennsylvania. He worked at Hearst News Service in San Francisco from 1900 to 1903, then joined President Theodore Roosevelt's press entourage on a train trip. Roosevelt, or a San Francisco newspaper editor, angry at having no photograph of George Frisbie Hoar to run with the story of his death, urged him to open a studio in Washington D.C. Harris and Martha Ewing opened their studio in 1905 at 1313 F Street NW. Ewing, an artist and colorist with whom he had worked, financed the company and managed the studio. They replaced the building with a new Harris & Ewing Photographic Studio building in 1924.

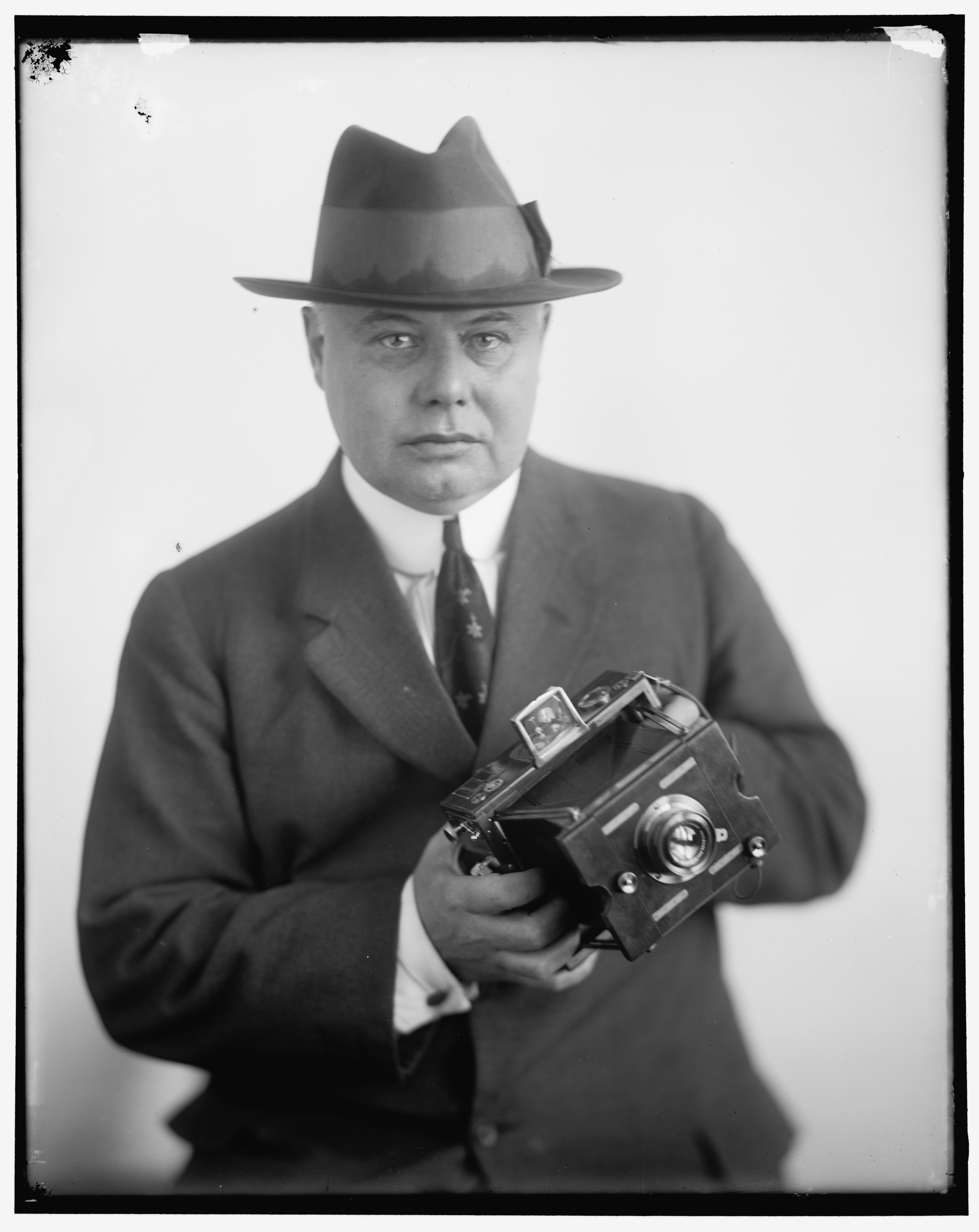
Unidentified Harris & Ewing news photographer

By the late 1930s Harris & Ewing was the largest photographic studio in the United States; at its peak, it had five studios, 120 employees, and a news photo service, which, like Underwood & Underwood, employed large numbers of freelance photographers. Although it was particularly known for formal portraits of government figures, it was a full service photographic firm.

The studio became well known in 1908 with The Anatomy of a Smile, a series of candid shots of William Howard Taft receiving the news by telephone of his nomination for the Presidency. Many performers also sat for portraits with the firm. Harris was the primary photographer until 1955, when he retired. He bought out Ewing's share of the company in 1915, but she continued to assist, especially through her social connections. The news service was sold in 1945. Harris died in 1964 at age 92. Harris & Ewing closed in 1977.

== Legacy ==
On his retirement, Harris gave some 700,000 glass and film negatives to the Library of Congress. They are preserved as the Harris & Ewing Collection in the Prints and Photographs Division. Largely taken in and around Washington between 1905 and 1945, the photos portray people, events, and architecture. Many are scanned and online. The City Museum of Washington, D.C. also has a large number of Harris & Ewing photographs, and others are held by the National Portrait Gallery and the Newseum. The Professional Photographers of America named its highest award after Harris.

== See also ==
- George Grantham Bain — Bain News Service Collection
