= Premier Education Group =

United States based vocational education institution

- Type: Private; Vocational
- Location: New Haven, Connecticut
- Website: premiereducationgroup.com

The Premier Education Group (PEG) is a privately held company that operates for-profit vocational education institutions in the northeastern United States. Programs offered by PEG institutions vary by location, but include training in massage therapy, medical assisting, medical billing, paralegal, and computer information technology.

Premier is based in New Haven, Connecticut. The company was started in 1965, when it established its first school.

== Institutions ==
Premier operates programs at these locations under these institutional names:

- Branford Hall Career Institute has locations in Branford and Southington, Connecticut; Springfield, Massachusetts; Albany, Amityville and Bohemia, New York; and Jersey City and Parsippany New Jersey.
- Harris School of Business was opened in New Jersey in 1965 by Ethel Harris of Camden, New Jersey. Harris School of Business now has locations in Danbury, Connecticut; Dover and Wilmington, Delaware; Sanford, Maine; Cherry Hill, Hamilton, Linwood and Voorhees, New Jersey; and Upper Darby Township, Pennsylvania.
- Salter College has two locations in Massachusetts, one in Chicopee and one in West Boylston (Worcester area). Premier acquired it in 2002 and oversaw its transition from a certificate-only trade school to an accredited two-year college.
- Salter School had locations in Fall River, New Bedford, and Tewksbury, Massachusetts. It maintains a location in Malden.
- Salter School of Nursing & Allied Health is located in Manchester, New Hampshire.
- American College for Medical Careers is located in Orlando, Florida.

== Controversy ==
Premier Education Group has faced allegations of fraudulently misrepresenting school accreditations and certifications, and of unprofessional academic practices. A federal lawsuit by seven former employees charges that school officials routinely misled students about their career prospects, and falsified records to enroll them and keep them enrolled, so that they could continue to get government grant and loan dollars.
