= Gerald Archie Mangun =

American Christian leader

Gerald Archie "G.A." Mangun
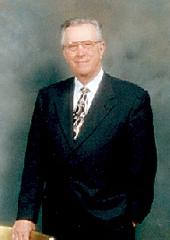
- Born: Bishop Gerald Archie Mangun; March 11, 1919; La Paz, Indiana, US
- Died: June 17, 2010 (aged 91); Alexandria, Louisiana, US
- Resting place: Forest Lawn Memorial Park in Pineville, Louisiana
- Education: Doctorate, Apostolic Bible Institute
- Alma mater: Apostolic Bible Institute in St. Paul, Minnesota
- Occupations: Minister, Pastor, Bishop
- Years active: 1942–2010
- Spouse: Vesta Layne Gibson
- Children: 1
- Website: http://www.thepentecostals.org

Gerald Archie Mangun (March 11, 1919 – June 17, 2010), usually known as G. A. Mangun, built one of the largest churches of the United Pentecostal Church International denomination in the city of Alexandria, Louisiana.

== Early life ==
Mangun was born in La Paz in Marshall County in northern Indiana, to Walter Mangun and the former Bertha Birk. He was one of seven children: Woodrow Riddle, Mildred (Mangun) Shock, Gladys (Mangun) Starkweather, Grace (Mangun) Coleman, Dr. Ruth (Mangun) Holland, and Martha (Mangun) Spencer. After graduating in 1938 from Lincoln High School in Plymouth, Indiana, Mangun attended Apostolic Bible Institute in St. Paul, Minnesota. He was ordained a minister in 1942.

== Early ministry ==
After leaving Bible college, Mangun traveled to the American South, where he held a Christian revival in Lou-Ann, Arkansas. Occasions to minister began to open in Indiana and Ohio, then in Louisiana and Texas. He preached at many revivals in small towns in Louisiana such as Starks, Clarks, Eros, and Hodge. He next traveled to Diboll, Texas, where he met Vesta Layne Gibson, a preacher's daughter, whom he married on September 10, 1943.

Together, they traveled from state to state for seven years, in places such as St. Louis, Missouri; West Monroe, Provençal, and Camp Eight, Louisiana; Zavalla and Lufkin, Texas; DeQuincy, Louisiana, and back to his home state of Indiana in Gary, Plymouth, and Mishawaka; and on to Sunbury, Pennsylvania, where he received a call from a Reverend Pardue to hold a revival in his church in Alexandria, Louisiana.

The Manguns' only child, Anthony, was born in January 1950.

== Establishing the legacy ==
By June 1950, Mangun was elected pastor of the First United Pentecostal Church in Alexandria, since renamed The Pentecostals of Alexandria. At that time the small church was located at 16th and Day Streets, and was home to a congregation of only thirty-eight adult members. Today, the church is situated on Rapides Avenue, and includes a Family Life Center, the G. A. Mangun Center – an auditorium and education building - and the main sanctuary, which seats approximately 2,200.

From 1951 to 2007, Mangun served as the presbyter over the United Pentecostal churches in the Louisiana District's Section 7, comprising approximately thirty-five churches in the Central Louisiana area. He also served as a member of the District Board of the Louisiana District United Pentecostal Church. He was the longest tenured District Board member in any district in United Pentecostal Church history. Following his retirement he was named as an honorary member of that board. It was about this time that the title of bishop was bestowed upon him, as his son, Anthony, became senior pastor of the Alexandria congregation.

He served the United Pentecostal Church International as a member of its Foreign Missions Board beginning in 1982. He also served a single term as an Executive Presbyter of the UPCI General Board during 1986–87.

In September 2004, he was inducted into the United Pentecostal Church International's "Order of the Faith," – a prestigious award honoring him "for outstanding achievement and exemplary service."

During Mangun's almost 60-year tenure as pastor of The Pentecostals of Alexandria, his congregation became known for its music and the Easter production, Messiah.

U.S. President Bill Clinton and his wife, Hillary Clinton attended once while he was governor of Arkansas, and Clinton himself made a return visit during his presidency. Peter Jennings attended the production while researching the ABC special Peter Jennings Reporting: The Search for Jesus.

== Community service ==
Mangun was formerly a chaplain for the Louisiana State Police (Troop E), the Rapides Parish Sheriff's Department, and the Civil Air Patrol. He was a member of the Rapides Parish Airport Authority and the Alexandria Port Authority. He also served as a member of the St. Francis Cabrini Hospital's advisory board. He officiated at the first burial in Alexandria Memorial Gardens.

Commemorating Bishop Mangun's 70th birthday, then Mayor Ned Randolph of Alexandria declared March 11, 1989 "G. A. Mangun Day." In 2002, the Louisiana National Guard presented Mangun with a Civilian Service Medal for his service to his community and nation.

On June 23, 2010, U.S. Senator David Vitter entered into the Congressional Record a remembrance of G. A. Mangun for his community service.
