= Judge Harris =

Judge Harris may refer to:

- Edward Harris (North Carolina judge) (1763–1813), judge of the United States Circuit Court for the Fifth Circuit
- George Bernard Harris (1901–1983), judge of the United States District Court for the Northern District of California
- Oren Harris (1903–1997), judge of the United States District Courts for the Eastern and Western Districts of Arkansas
- Pamela Harris (judge) (born 1962), judge of the United States Court of Appeals for the Fourth Circuit
- Stanley S. Harris (1927–2021), judge of the United States District Court for the District of Columbia

== See also ==
- Justice Harris (disambiguation)
