= Harris Mountain =

Harris Mountain may refer to:

- Harris Mountain (Alabama) in Alabama, USA
- Harris Mountain (Arkansas) in Arkansas, USA
- Harris Mountain (Arizona) in Arizona, USA
- Harris Mountain (California) in California, USA
- Harris Mountain (Georgia) in Georgia, USA
- Harris Mountain (Cascade County, Montana) in Cascade County, Montana, USA
- Harris Mountain (Chouteau County, Montana) in Chouteau County, Montana, USA
- Harris Mountain (Nevada) in Nevada, USA
- Harris Mountain (North Carolina) in North Carolina, USA

See also: Harris Mountains
