= Harris Township =

Harris Township may refer to:

- Harris Township, Stone County, Arkansas, in Stone County, Arkansas
- Harris Township, Fulton County, Illinois
- Harris Township, St. Joseph County, Indiana
- Harris Township, Michigan
- Harris Township, Itasca County, Minnesota
- Harris Township, Ripley County, Missouri
- Harris Township, Franklin County, North Carolina, in Franklin County, North Carolina
- Harris Township, Stanly County, North Carolina, in Stanly County, North Carolina
- Harris Township, Ottawa County, Ohio
- Harris Township, Centre County, Pennsylvania
