= Soay Beag =

Scottish tidal island

Native name: Sòdhaigh Beag
- Interactive map of Soay Beag

Geography
- Location: West Loch Tarbert, Harris
- Coordinates: 57°56′40″N 6°58′42″W
- Archipelago: Outer Hebrides

Administration
- United Kingdom

Demographics
- Population: 0

Additional information
- Tidal island, accessible on foot from Soay Mòr at low tide

Soay Beag (Scottish Gaelic: Sòdhaigh Beag) is a small, uninhabited tidal island in West Loch Tarbert, between the northern and southern parts of Harris. Soay Beag is separated from the southwest coast of North Harris by the Soay Sound. The island is located immediately to the northwest of the larger Soay Mòr, which is accessible on foot at low tide. Soay Beag's highest elevation is 37m (121 feet).
