= Salter College =

For-profit college in West Boylston, Massachusetts

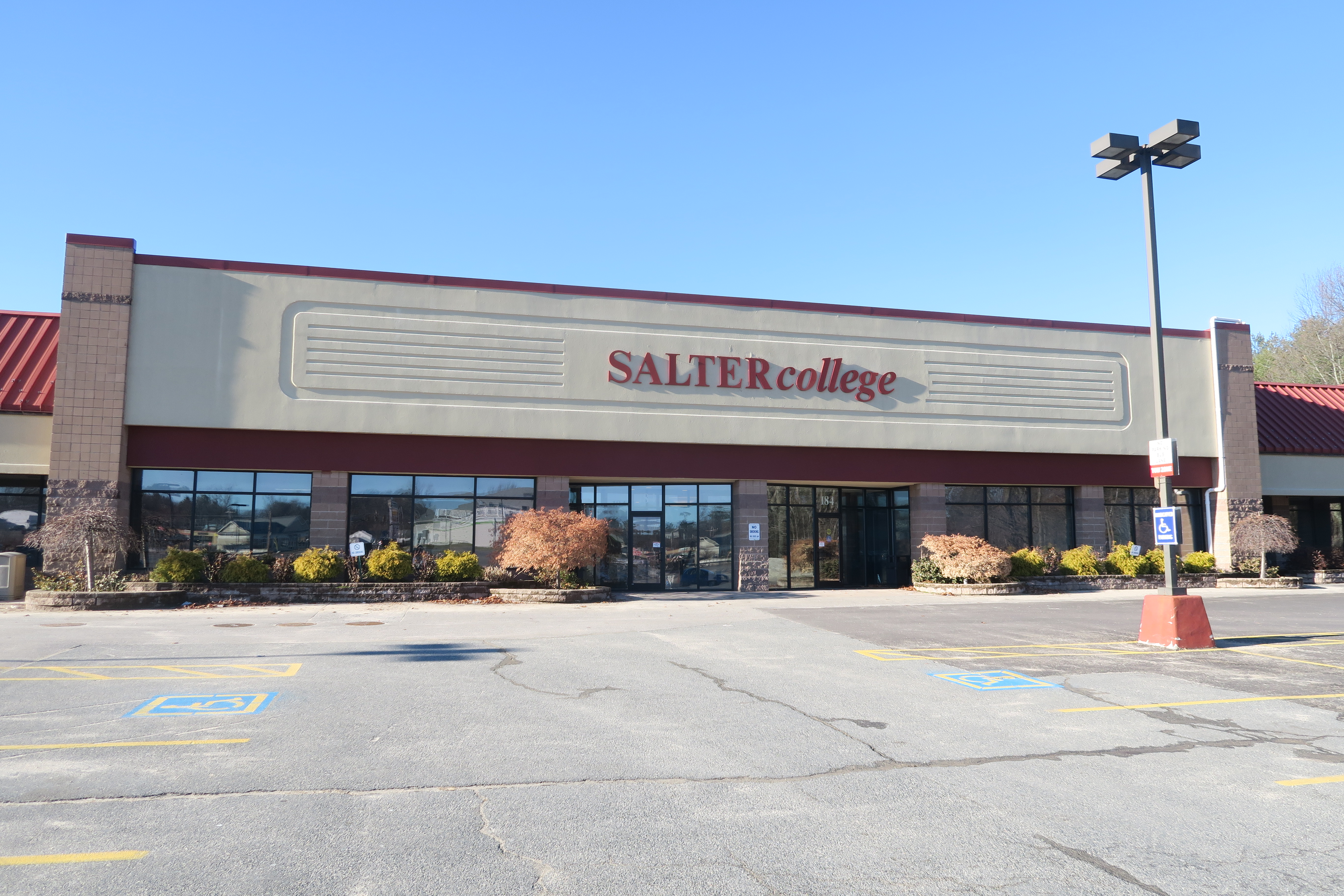
- Salter College
- Former name: Salter School
- Type: Private
- Active: 1937 (Salter School); 2007 (Salter College)–July 2019
- Location: West Boylston, Massachusetts, United States; 42°21′00″N 71°47′09″W
- Website: www.salter.edu

Salter College was a for-profit junior college with locations in West Boylston and Chicopee, Massachusetts. It was owned by Premier Education Group.

== History ==
Salter began as the Salter School in 1937, when Dorothy Salter opened a secretarial school. It was originally located on Cedar Street in Worcester, Massachusetts. The school's offerings expanded over time, and in 2002 the school was bought by Premier Education Group. "Salter College" was launched by Premier in 2007 with a new facility in West Boylston. The college awarded its first three associate degrees in June 2008.

Salter College is a private two-year college with programs in business, health care, and computers. It was accredited by the Accrediting Council for Independent Colleges and Schools (ACICS) to award degrees and certificates. Salter College Medical Assisting Certificate program was accredited by the Commission on Accreditation of Allied Health Education Programs (www.caahep.org) upon recommendation of the Curriculum Review Board of the American Association of Medical Assistant Endowment (AAMAE).

The college had two locations, the original in West Boylston, and one in Chicopee, Massachusetts which opened in August 2011 in a building which had previously been the site of a strip club before being renovated for educational use.

== Enrollment controversy ==
The Massachusetts Attorney General brought claims against Salter College alleging deceptive enrollment tactics. An investigation by the state government found that Salter had engaged in dubious marketing tactics and false promises to lure students into its health-related training programs. Salter, together with the Salter Schools, settled the claims in 2014 for $3.75 million.
