= La Paz, Indiana =

Town in the United States

LaPaz, Indiana
- Town
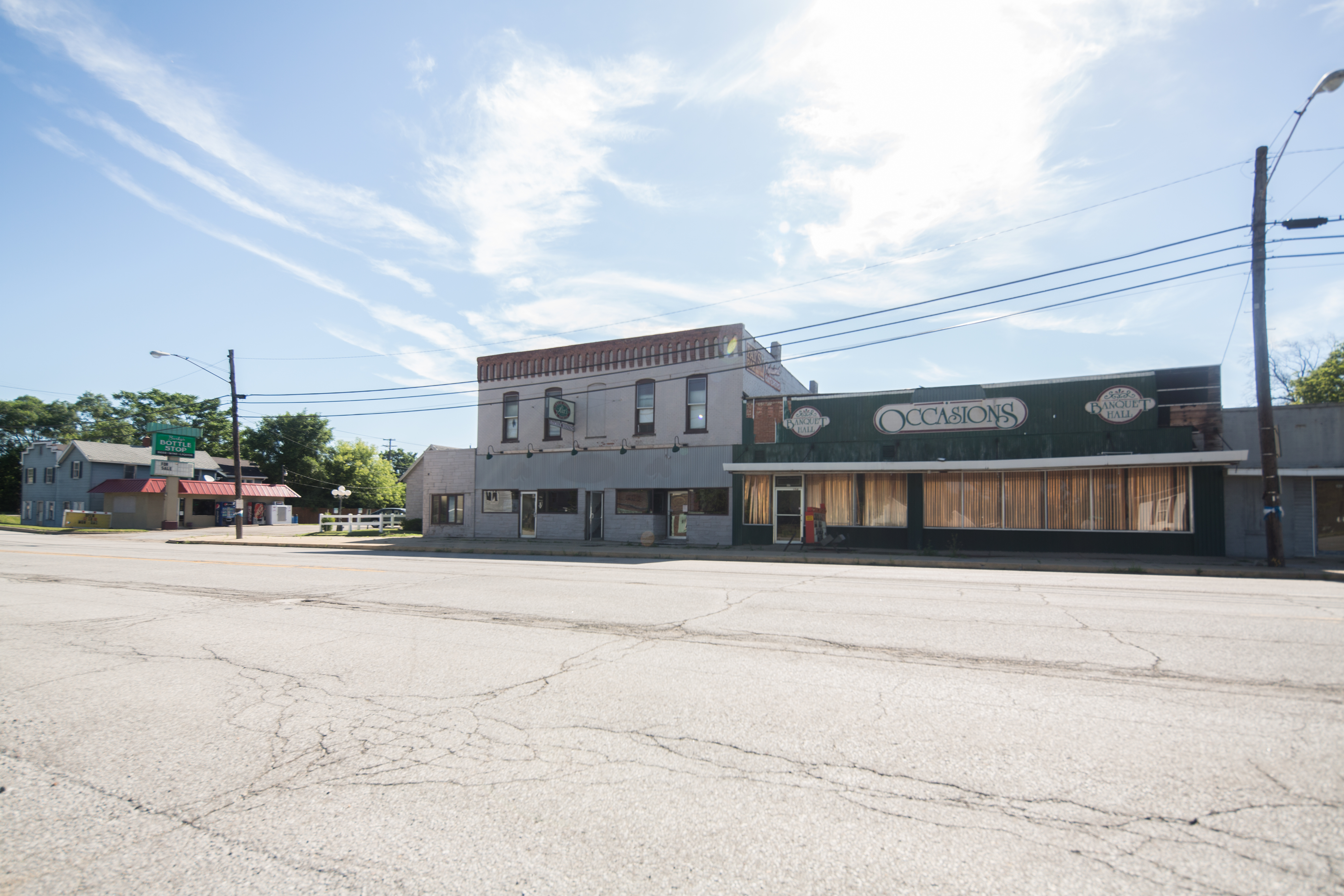

- Seal

- Location in Marshall County, Indiana
- Coordinates: 41°27′28″N 86°18′32″W
- Country: United States
- State: Indiana
- County: Marshall
- Township: North

Area
  - Total: 0.39 sq mi (1.00 km^{2})
  - Land: 0.39 sq mi (1.00 km^{2})
  - Water: 0 sq mi (0.00 km^{2})
- Elevation: 863 ft (263 m)

Population (2020)
  - Total: 475
  - Density: 1,224.7/sq mi (472.85/km^{2})
- Time zone: UTC-5 (EST)
  - Summer (DST): UTC-4 (EST)
- ZIP code: 46537
- Area code: 574
- FIPS code: 18-42192
- GNIS feature ID: 437489
- Website: www.lapazindiana.com

LaPaz is a town in North Township, Marshall County, Indiana, United States. The population was 475 at the 2020 census, down from 561 in 2010.

== History ==
The town was founded in 1873 and was named for La Paz, Bolivia. At the time of its founding, it was served by the Chicago branch of the Baltimore and Ohio Railroad, now CSX. The B&O named a coach La Paz in 1949 to honor the town.

== Geography ==
LaPaz is located in northern Marshall County at 41°27′26″N 86°18′29″W. It is located on former U.S. Route 31 (now Indiana State Road 931), just to the north of where it intersects with U.S. Route 6. US 31 passes 1 mile (1.6 km) east of the town on a four-lane freeway, leading north 17 miles (27 km) to South Bend. Plymouth, the Marshall county seat, is 8 miles (13 km) to the south. US 6 leads east 8 miles (13 km) to Bremen and west 10 miles (16 km) to Walkerton.

According to the U.S. Census Bureau, La Paz has a total area of 0.39 square miles (1.01 km^{2}), all land. The town sits on a low rise separating land draining west toward Pine Creek and land draining east toward the Yellow River; both waterways are west-flowing tributaries of the Kankakee River and part of the Illinois River watershed.

== Demographics ==
Historical population
Census	Pop.	Note	%±
1880	84		—
1910	263		—
1920	274		4.2%
1930	375		36.9%
1940	429		14.4%
1950	512		19.3%
1960	545		6.4%
1970	604		10.8%
1980	651		7.8%
1990	562		−13.7%
2000	489		−13.0%
2010	561		14.7%
2020	475		−15.3%
U.S. Decennial Census

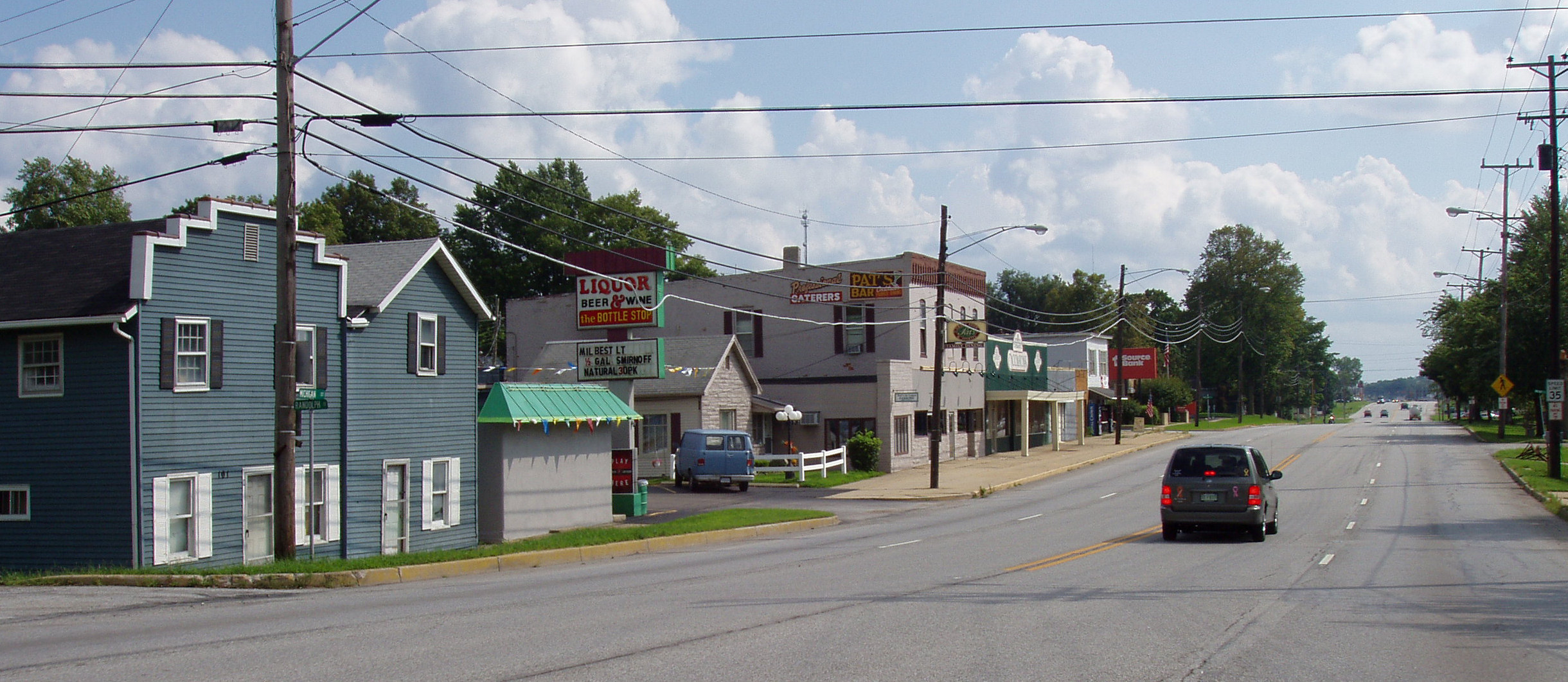
Downtown La Paz

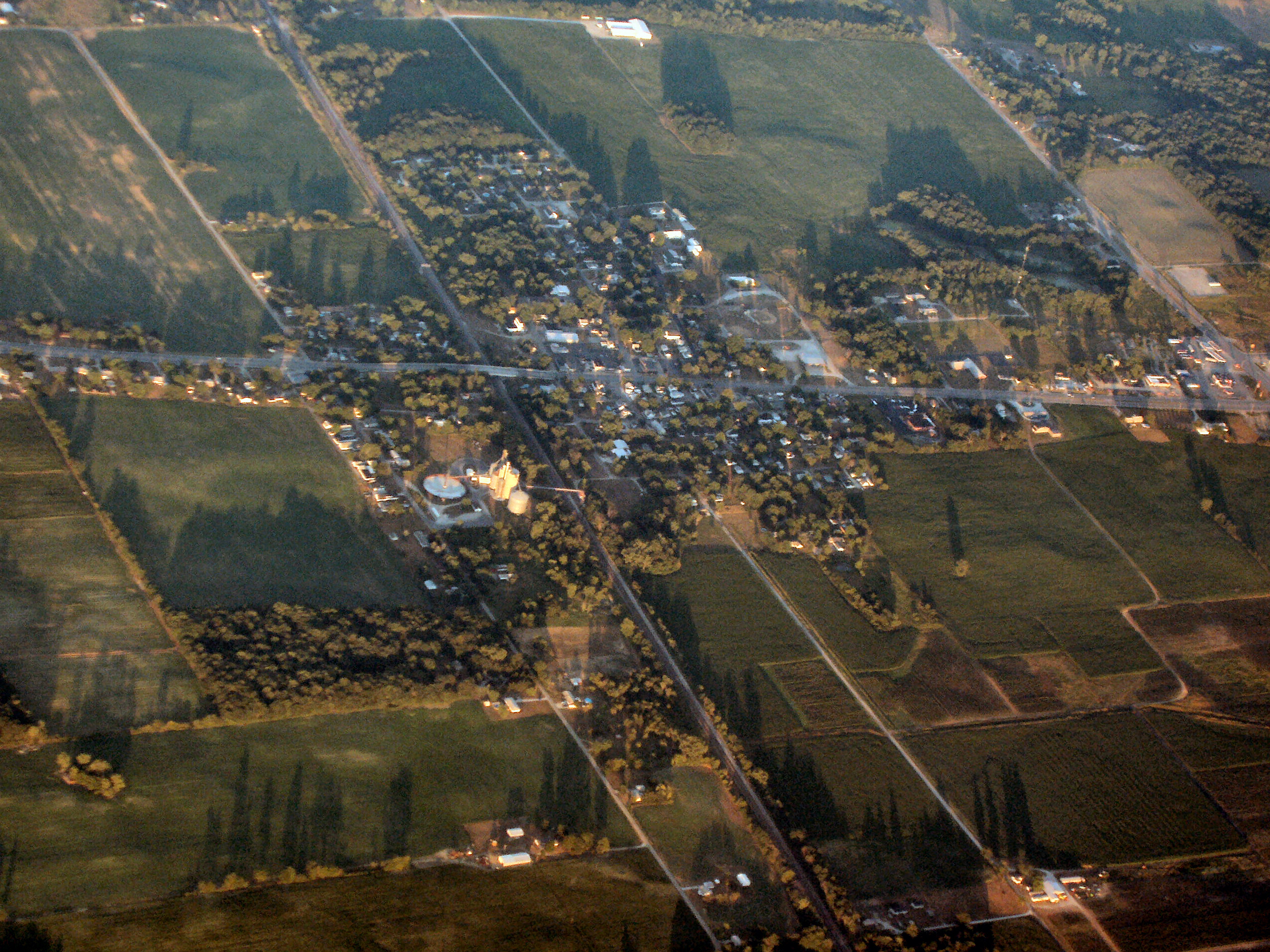
La Paz from the air, looking southeast

=== 2010 census ===
As of the census of 2010, there were 561 people, 216 households, and 144 families living in the town. The population density was 1,476.3 inhabitants per square mile (570.0/km^{2}). There were 251 housing units at an average density of 660.5 per square mile (255.0/km^{2}). The racial makeup of the town was 97.9% White, 0.2% African American, 0.2% Native American, 0.2% Asian, 0.5% from other races, and 1.1% from two or more races. Hispanic or Latino of any race were 4.3% of the population.

There were 216 households, of which 35.2% had children under the age of 18 living with them, 46.3% were married couples living together, 13.4% had a female householder with no husband present, 6.9% had a male householder with no wife present, and 33.3% were non-families. 28.2% of all households were made up of individuals, and 12.9% had someone living alone who was 65 years of age or older. The average household size was 2.60 and the average family size was 3.24.

The median age in the town was 35.1 years. 29.4% of residents were under the age of 18; 7.7% were between the ages of 18 and 24; 23.7% were from 25 to 44; 26.9% were from 45 to 64; and 12.3% were 65 years of age or older. The gender makeup of the town was 47.1% male and 52.9% female.

=== 2000 census ===
As of the census of 2000, there were 489 people, 209 households, and 136 families living in the town. The population density was 948.6 inhabitants per square mile (366.3/km^{2}). There were 225 housing units at an average density of 436.5 per square mile (168.5/km^{2}). The racial makeup of the town was 96.73% White, 0.20% African American, 0.82% Native American, 1.02% from other races, and 1.23% from two or more races. Hispanic or Latino of any race were 2.25% of the population.

There were 209 households, out of which 30.6% had children under the age of 18 living with them, 45.9% were married couples living together, 10.5% had a female householder with no husband present, and 34.9% were non-families. 30.6% of all households were made up of individuals, and 11.5% had someone living alone who was 65 years of age or older. The average household size was 2.34 and the average family size was 2.84.

In the town, the population was spread out, with 25.8% under the age of 18, 10.6% from 18 to 24, 31.7% from 25 to 44, 21.7% from 45 to 64, and 10.2% who were 65 years of age or older. The median age was 34 years. For every 100 females, there were 102.1 males. For every 100 females age 18 and over, there were 96.2 males.

The median income for a household in the town was $37,961, and the median income for a family was $39,667. Males had a median income of $30,089 versus $21,083 for females. The per capita income for the town was $16,658. About 4.1% of families and 5.2% of the population were below the poverty line, including 9.6% of those under age 18 and 4.2% of those age 65 or over.

== Education ==
Public schools in La Paz are operated by Union-North United Schools.

== Notable people ==
- Gerald Archie Mangun, Pentecostal minister
- Donald Yeagley, Indiana state legislator and labor union activist
