= North Township =

North Township may refer to:

== Indiana ==
- North Township, Lake County, Indiana
- North Township, Marshall County, Indiana

== Kansas ==
- North Township, Labette County, Kansas, in Labette County, Kansas
- North Township, Woodson County, Kansas, in Woodson County, Kansas

== Minnesota ==
- North Township, Minnesota

== Missouri ==
- North Township, Dade County, Missouri

== Ohio ==
- North Township, Harrison County, Ohio
