= Harrisville =

Harrisville may refer to the following places:

Australia

- Harrisville, Queensland, a town and locality in the Scenic Rim Region

New Zealand

- Harrisville, New Zealand

United States

- Harrisville, Indiana
- Harrisville, Maryland
- Harrisville, Michigan
- Harrisville, Mississippi
- Harrisville, New Hampshire
- Harrisville, New Jersey
- Harrisville, New York
- Harrisville, Ohio
- Harrisville, Pennsylvania
- Harrisville, Rhode Island
- Harrisville, Utah
- Harrisville, West Virginia
- Harrisville, Wisconsin
- Harrisville Township, Medina County, Ohio
- Harrisville Township, Michigan

== See also ==
- Harris (disambiguation)
- Harrisburg (disambiguation)
- Harrison (disambiguation)
