= Harrisburg, Stark County, Ohio =

Unincorporated community in Ohio, U.S.

Coordinates: 40°52′45″N 81°14′18″W

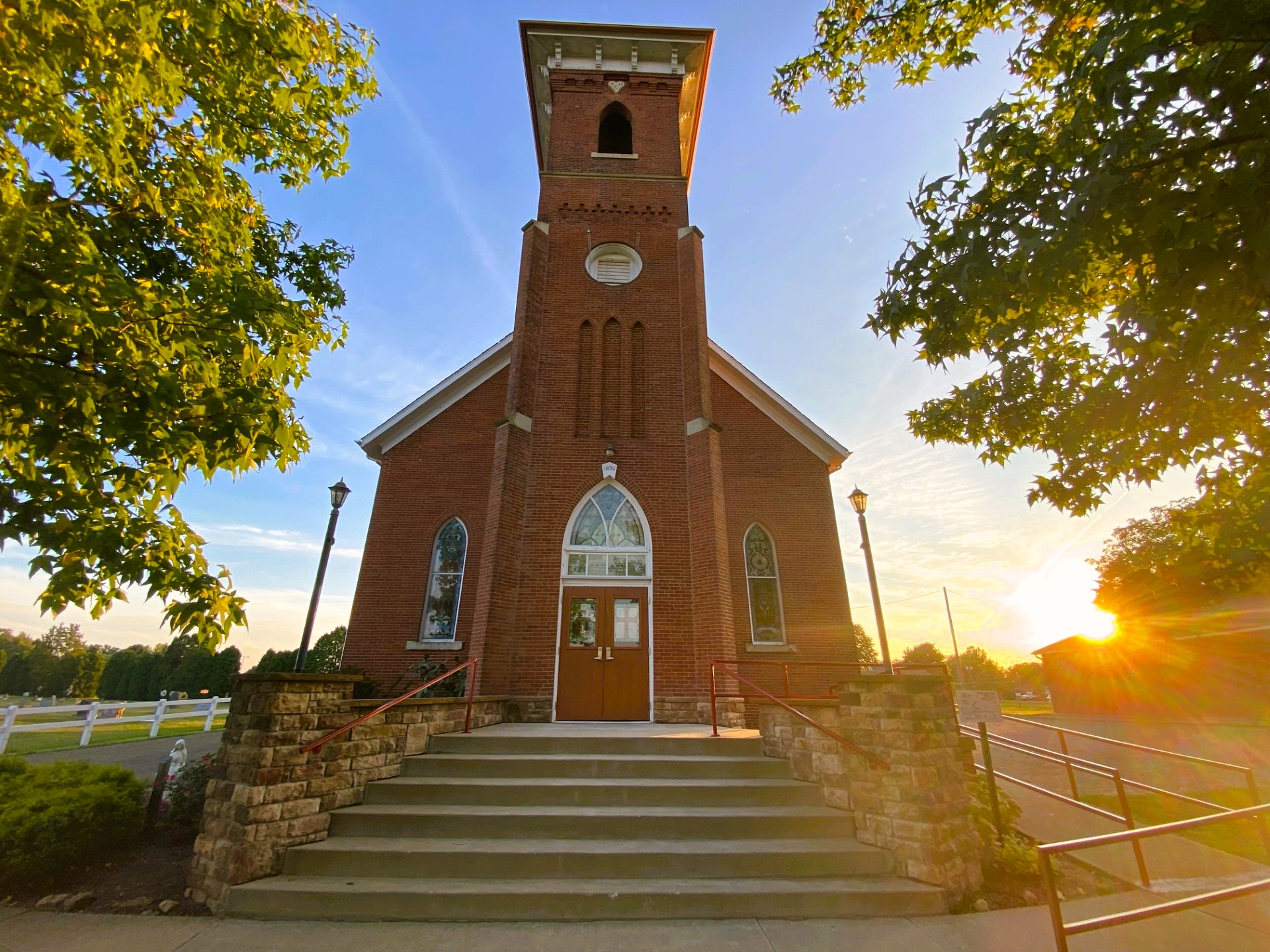
Sacred Heart of Mary Church in Harrisburg

Harrisburg is an unincorporated community and census-designated place in Stark County, in the U.S. state of Ohio.

== History ==
Harrisburg was laid out in 1827, and named after Harrisburg, Pennsylvania. A variant name was Barryville. A post office called Barryville was established in 1830, and remained in operation until 1906.
