= Harris & Ewing Photographic Studio =

- U.S. National Register of Historic Places
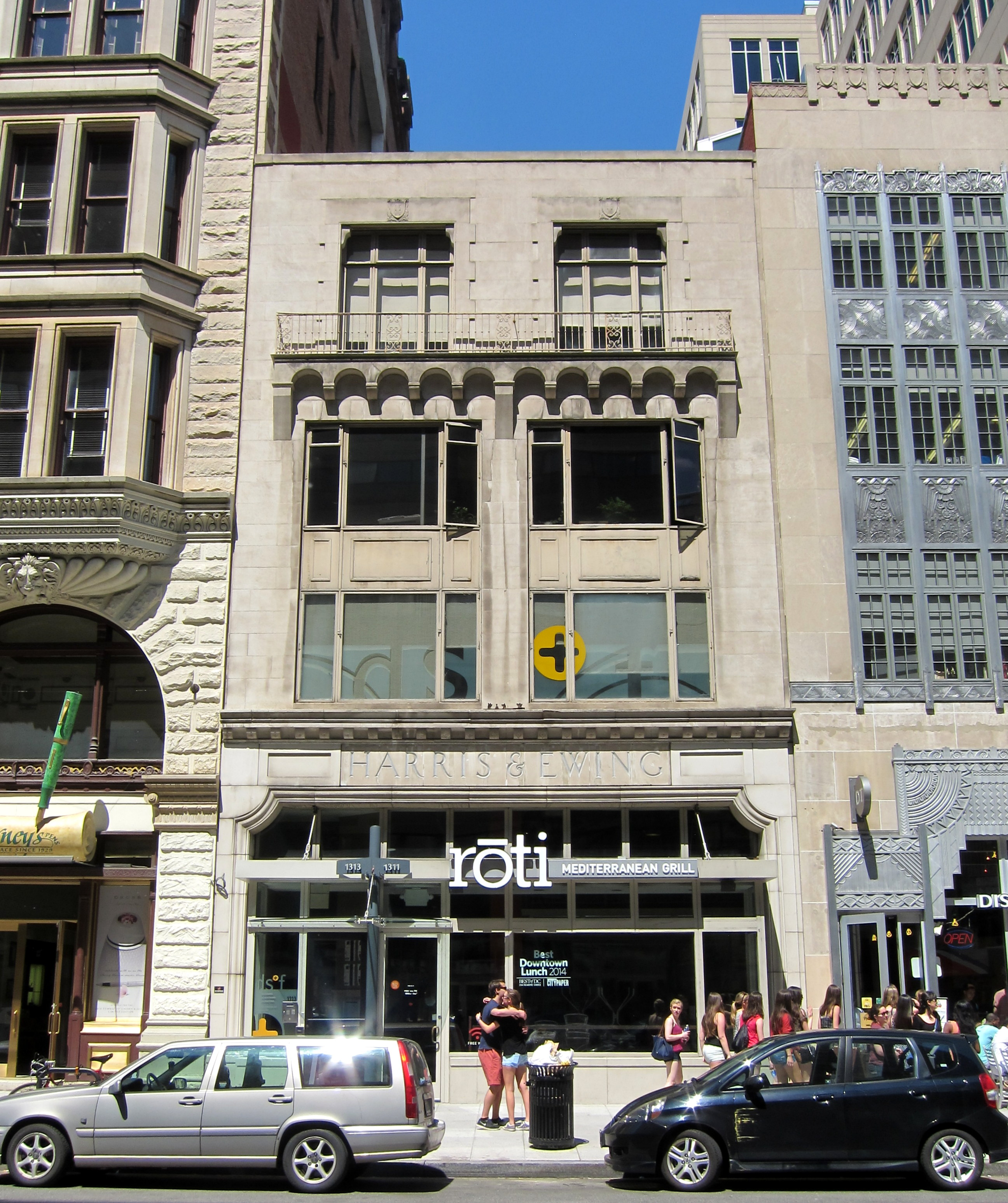
- Harris & Ewing Photographic Studio in 2015

- Location within Washington, D.C.
- Location: 1311-1313 F Street, NW; Washington, D.C.
- Coordinates: 38°53′51″N 77°1′51″W
- Built: 1924
- Architect: Sonnemann & Justement
- Architectural style: Renaissance Revival
- NRHP reference No.: 94001407
- Added to NRHP: December 16, 1994

Harris & Ewing Photographic Studio is an historic structure located in downtown Washington, D.C. It was built in 1924 and listed on the National Register of Historic Places in 1994.

== History ==
The building housed Harris & Ewing, which in the early 20th century was the largest news photo service in the United States. They also served as the official White House photographer and the city's most noted portrait photographers from 1905 to 1955. This building with its Italian Renaissance Revival limestone façade replaced an earlier building built by Harris & Ewing in 1905. It was designed by the architectural firm of Sonnemann & Justement.

Today the building houses advertising agency Don Schaaf & Friends, Inc. (ds+f).
