= Salter School =

School in Boston, Massachusetts, US

Coordinates: 42°36′41.8″N 71°17′12.2″W

- Type: For-profit college
- Established: 1937
- Location: Malden, Boston, Massachusetts, United States
- Website: Official website

Salter School is a for-profit vocational school in Malden. It is operated as a component of the Premier Education Group. Salter School grew from the Salter Secretarial School established in Massachusetts in 1937. As its academic and business reputation grew, the Salter School moved locations and removed "secretarial" from the title in 1981. Salter School also introduced expanded career programs.

In 1984 and 1985, the Salter School established two accredited career training programs. In 1995, the Salter School added its Medical Assistant program. In 2000, Medical Billing and Coding (Health Claims Specialist). It later added Massage Therapy, Paralegal and additional programs. Salter School also added new campuses and a sister college called Salter College. In the late 2010s, all of the campuses except the Malden campus closed following multiple million-dollar settlements related to allegations that the Premier Education Group misled students. A 2019 settlement with the Massachusetts Attorney General prohibits the school from enrolling students in Massachusetts and will close all of the remaining campuses by the end of 2019.

== Controversies ==
In 2014, the Massachusetts Attorney General brought claims against the Salter School alleging deceptive enrollment tactics. An investigation by the state government found that Salter had engaged in dubious marketing tactics and false promises to lure students into its health-related training programs. Salter, together with its sister college Salter College, settled the claims in 2014 for $3.75 million.

Two years later, Premier Education Group settled a complaint filed by the Massachusetts Department of Professional Licensure alleging that the company "published misleading graduate job placement statistics, employed instructors whose qualifications had not been approved by DPL, and used misleading and high-pressure tactics in recruits new students." The company settled for $150,000 and its Tewksbury location was prevented from admitting students for six months but it did not admit wrongdoing.

In 2019, the company was again charged by the state Attorney General for misleading students. The company settled for $1.6 million, can no longer enroll students in Massachusetts, and will shut down its two remaining campuses by the end of the year.

== Campus locations ==
- Fall River, Massachusetts closed
- Malden, Massachusetts, closing by end of 2019
- New Bedford, Massachusetts closed
- Tewksbury, Massachusetts closed
- West Boylston, closing by end of 2019

== Accreditation ==
Salter School is accredited by the Accrediting Council for Independent Colleges and Schools (ACICS).
