= Soay Mòr =

Island in Outer Hebrides, Scotland

Sòdhaigh Mòr (Gaelic)

Location
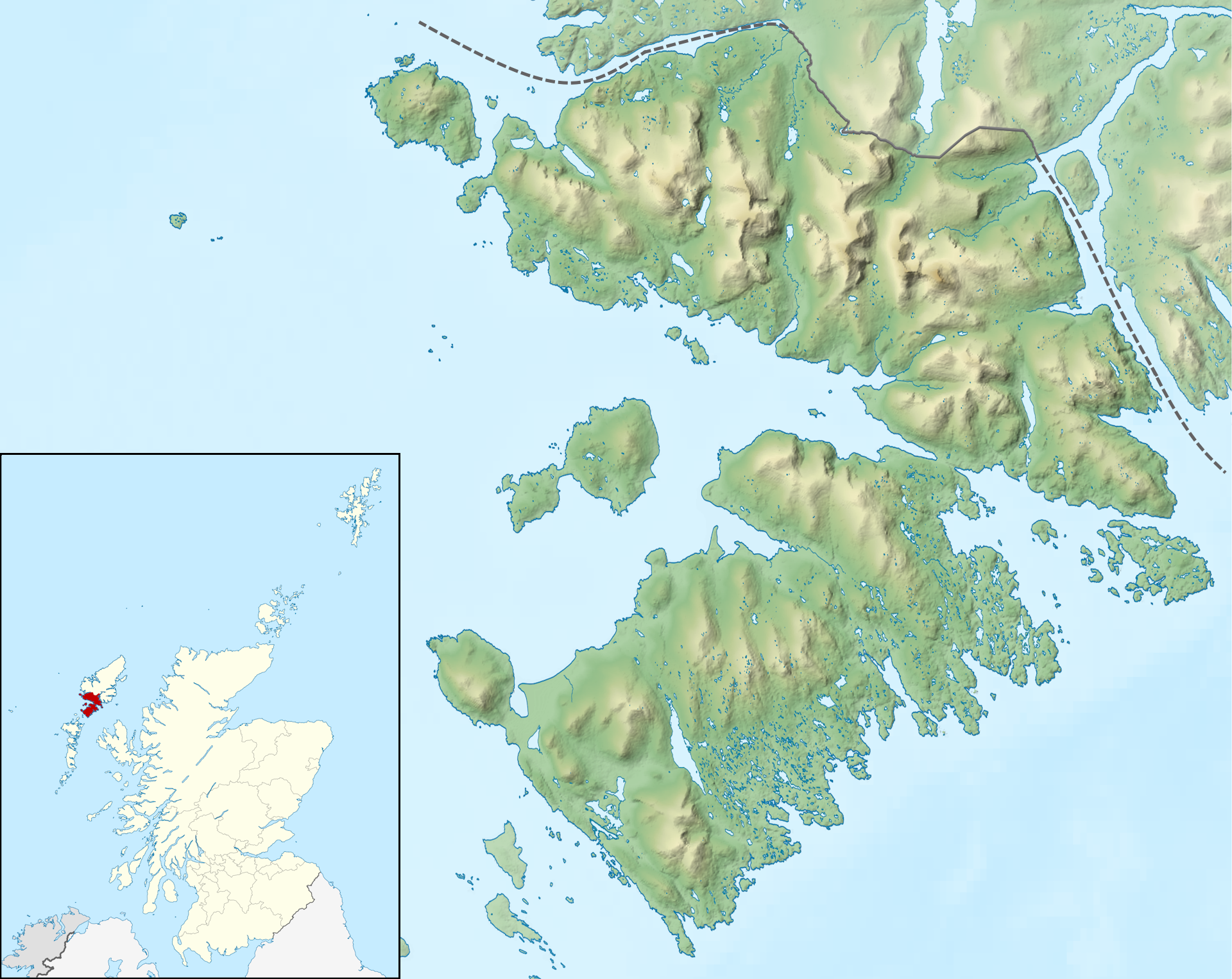
- Soay Mòr shown next to Harris Soay Mòr shown within the Outer Hebrides
- OS grid reference: NB063051
- Coordinates: 57.87°N 6.69°W

Physical geography
- Island group: Lewis and Harris
- Area: 45 ha (110 acres)
- Area rank: 210=
- Highest elevation: 37 m (121 ft)

Administration
- Council area: Na h-Eileanan Siar
- Country: Scotland
- Sovereign state: United Kingdom

Demographics
- Population: 0

Soay Mòr (Scottish Gaelic: Sòdhaigh Mòr) is an island in West Loch Tarbert, between the northern and southern parts of Harris. The uninhabited island is separated from the southwest coast of North Harris by the Soay Sound. The adjacent Soay Beag is accessible on foot at low tide.

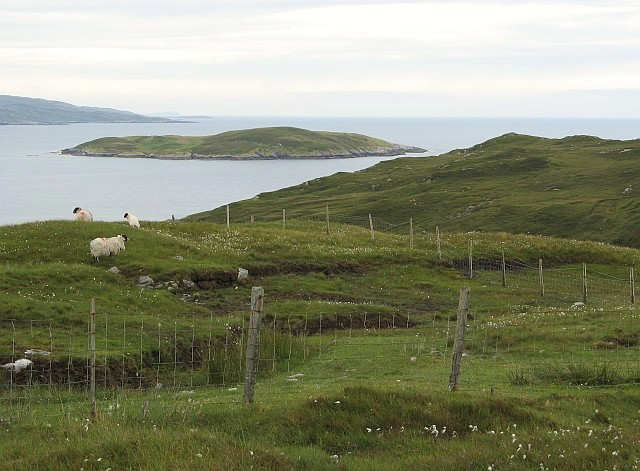
Soay Mòr from Harris
