= Harris City =

Harris City may refer to:

- Harris City, Georgia
- Harris City, Indiana
