= Harrisonburg =

Harrisonburg may refer to a place in the United States:

- Harrisonburg, Louisiana
- Harrisonburg, Virginia
