= Donald Yeagley =

American politician (1920–2020)

Member of the Indiana House of Representatives
- In office 1959–1963

Donald Rae Yeagley (May 6, 1920 – May 16, 2020) was an American politician and labor union activist.

Yeagley was born in La Paz, Indiana and graduated from Lakeville High School in 1937. He worked at a tool and die maker at Bendix Aviation Corporation. Yeagley was involved with the labor union movement and the United Automobile Workers. Yeagley served in the Indiana House of Representatives from 1959 to 1963 and was a Democrat. He then served in the Indiana Senate from 1963 to 1965. Yeagley died at the Tanglewood Trace Senior Living Community in Mishawaka, Indiana.
