= USS Harrisburg =

USS Harrisburg may refer to the following ships and other vessels:

- SS City of Paris (1888), a civilian ocean liner that served in the United States Navy during World War I as the transport USS Harrisburg during World War I
- USS Harrisburg (LPD-30), a future San Antonio-class amphibious transport dock
