= Harris Township, Ripley County, Missouri =

Township in Ripley County, Missouri, U.S.

Coordinates: 36.5358°N 90.7594°W

Harris Township is an inactive township in Ripley County, in the U.S. state of Missouri.

Harris Township was erected in 1871, taking its name Travis Harris, a state legislator.
