= Harris Tweed (disambiguation) =

Harris Tweed is a textile, made on Harris, Western Isles, Scotland.

Harris Tweed may also refer to:

- Harris Tweed (character), a character in The Eagle comic
- The former name of the South African music group Dear Reader

== See also ==
- Tweed (disambiguation)
- Twill
