= Harris School of Business =

American defunct business school

- Type: Private
- Active: 1965–August 9, 2020
- Founder: Ethel S. Harris
- Parent institution: Trigram Education Partners
- Accreditation: Accrediting Council for Independent Colleges and Schools
- Location: Voorhees Township, New Jersey, United States
- Website: www.harrisschool.edu

The Harris School of Business (HSB) was an American for-profit college and business school with locations in the northeast United States. It was a subsidiary of Trigram Education Partners.

HSB was founded in 1965 to provide post-secondary educations in allied health and business management.

According to the US Department of Education, "HSB’s last day of educational instruction was Oct. 9, 2020, which serves as its official closure date for purposes of the federal student aid programs. At its closure students could apply for a closed school discharge of their federal loans. In August 2020, the US Department of Education cut off Title IV funds to the schools.

== History ==
The Harris School of Business began as a small employment service founded by Ethel S. Harris. When Harris’ husband Dr. Arnold Harris died in 1957, she was left to raise three children on her own. As a way to support herself, she opened the employment service in 1959. The employment service was started as an agency for the unemployed to get connected with job opportunities. By 1965, training programs were introduced thus beginning the Harris School of Business. The school first became accredited in 1978. The original location in Cherry Hill has expanded to seven campuses in four different states. Shortly before Harris’ death, the Camden County Commission on Women honored her as a “Women Who Made a Difference in the Field of Business” in 1993.

Premier Education Group acquired Harris School of Business in 2003. In 2011, Premier Education Group faced allegations of fraudulently misrepresenting school accreditations and certifications, and of unprofessional academic practices. A federal lawsuit by seven former employees charges that school officials routinely misled students about their career prospects, and falsified records to enroll them and keep them enrolled, so that they could continue to get government grant and loan dollars. In another case brought by former Harris students in New Jersey, the complainants argued that the school "lied about what professional certifications they would qualify for after completing their courses." In 2014, a principal owner of Premier, Andrew N. Yao, was convicted of fraud and served time in federal prison.

From 2008 to 2015, HSB was under investigation by the US Department of Education. In 2019, the New Jersey Attorney General stopped Harris School of Business from advertising that its students were eligible to receive state supplemental loans to pay for college. In 2020, HSB received more than $1.4 million by the US Department of Education through the CARES Act.

Harris Business School campuses, closed since 2020, were last owned by Trigram Education Partners, which also owns Branford Hall Career Institutes and American School of Nursing and Medical Careers. In August 20201 Trigram's executives, Stanford Silverman and Jon Coover, were also indicted on federal racketeering charges. In October 2020, employees of Harris Business School in Dover, Delaware reported that Trigram had not been paid them in a month. Four HSB employees sued Trigram for wage theft. In January 2021, the New Hampshire Attorney General filed a complaint against Trigram Education for deceiving students about the loss of accreditation at Trigram's American School of Nursing and Medical Careers, in violation of the New Hampshire Consumer Protection Act

== Accreditation ==
The Harris School of Business first became an accredited education facility in 1978. The Danbury, CT, Upper Darby, PA and Cherry Hill, Linwood, and Hamilton, NJ campuses were formerly accredited by the Accrediting Council for Independent Colleges and Schools. These locations and the Wilmington, DE campus have been accredited by the Accrediting Council for Continuing Education & Training. The Dover, DE Voorhees, NJ and Upper Darby, PA campuses were accredited through the Accrediting Commission of Career Schools and Colleges (ACCSC). However, they withdrew their accreditation. The Surgical Technology program offered at these two campuses was programmatically accredited by The Accrediting Bureau of Health Education Schools (ABHES).

== Student outcomes ==
In 2015, the cohort student loan default rate for the Cherry Hill and Linwood campuses was 35%.

== Campuses ==
The Harris School had campuses in Cherry Hill, NJ, Danbury, CT, Dover, DE, Philadelphia, PA, Sanford, ME, Upper Darby, PA, Voorhees, NJ and Wilmington, DE.

=== Campus closings ===
In February 2021, the US Department of Education reported all campuses closed.
