= Linkville, Kansas City =

Neighborhood of Kansas City, Missouri, U.S.

Coordinates: 39.311°N 94.649°W

Linkville is a neighborhood of Kansas City, Missouri, United States.

Linkville was laid out in 1871, and named after Levi Link, a local merchant. A post office called Linkville was established in 1878, and remained in operation until 1907.
