= Branford Hall Career Institute =

Private college in the US

Branford Hall Career Institute was a for-profit career college, owned by Trigram Education Partners, with campuses in Branford, and Southington, Connecticut; Amityville, New York; Jersey City and Parsippany, New Jersey. According to the US Department of Education, "BHCI’s last day of educational instruction was September 25, 2020, which serves as its official closure date for purposes of the federal student aid programs." Students may apply for a closed school discharge of their federal loans.

== History ==
In August 2020, the US Department of Education cut off Title IV funds to the schools.

In January 2021, Branford Hall in Branford, Connecticut was stripped of its accreditation by ACCET.

In a letter dated January 11, 2021, Trigram Education Partners (the owners of Branford Hall) notified students, staff, and faculty that the Amityville, New York campus was closed by the Bureau of Proprietary School's Supervision (BPSS) due to lack of and inability to acquire funding.

In February 2021, Branford Hall in Jersey City and Parsippany New Jersey lost their accreditation from the Accrediting Commission for Career Schools and Colleges (ACCSC).

== See also ==
- Harris School of Business
