= Justice Harris =

Justice Harris may refer to:

- Carleton Harris (1909–1980), associate justice of the Arkansas Supreme Court
- Charles Coffin Harris (1822–1881), chief justice of the Supreme Court of The Kingdom of Hawaiʻi
- Henry Harris (Rhode Island) (fl. 1750s–1760s), associate justice of the Rhode Island Supreme Court
- Iverson L. Harris (1805–1876), associate justice of the Supreme Court of Georgia
- Ira Harris (1802–1875), justice of the New York Supreme Court and, ex officio, judge of the New York Court of Appeals
- John Harris (judge) (1769–1845), associate justice of the New Hampshire Supreme Court
- K. David Harris (1927–2010), associate justice of the Iowa Supreme Court
- Lawrence T. Harris (1873–1960), associate justice of the Oregon Supreme Court
- William Littleton Harris (1807–1868), associate justice of the Supreme Court of Mississippi
- William R. Harris (1803–1858), associate justice of the Tennessee Supreme Court

== See also ==
- Judge Harris (disambiguation)
