= Harrisburg, Gallia County, Ohio =

Unincorporated community in Ohio, U.S.

Coordinates: 38°53′58″N 82°20′43″W

Harrisburg is an unincorporated community in Gallia County, in the U.S. state of Ohio.

== History ==
Harrisburg was platted in 1837. A variant name was Harris. A post office called Harris was established in 1857, and remained in operation until 1905.
