= West Loch Tarbert =

Sea loch in the Outer Hebrides of Scotland

Coordinates: 57.927°N 6.935°W

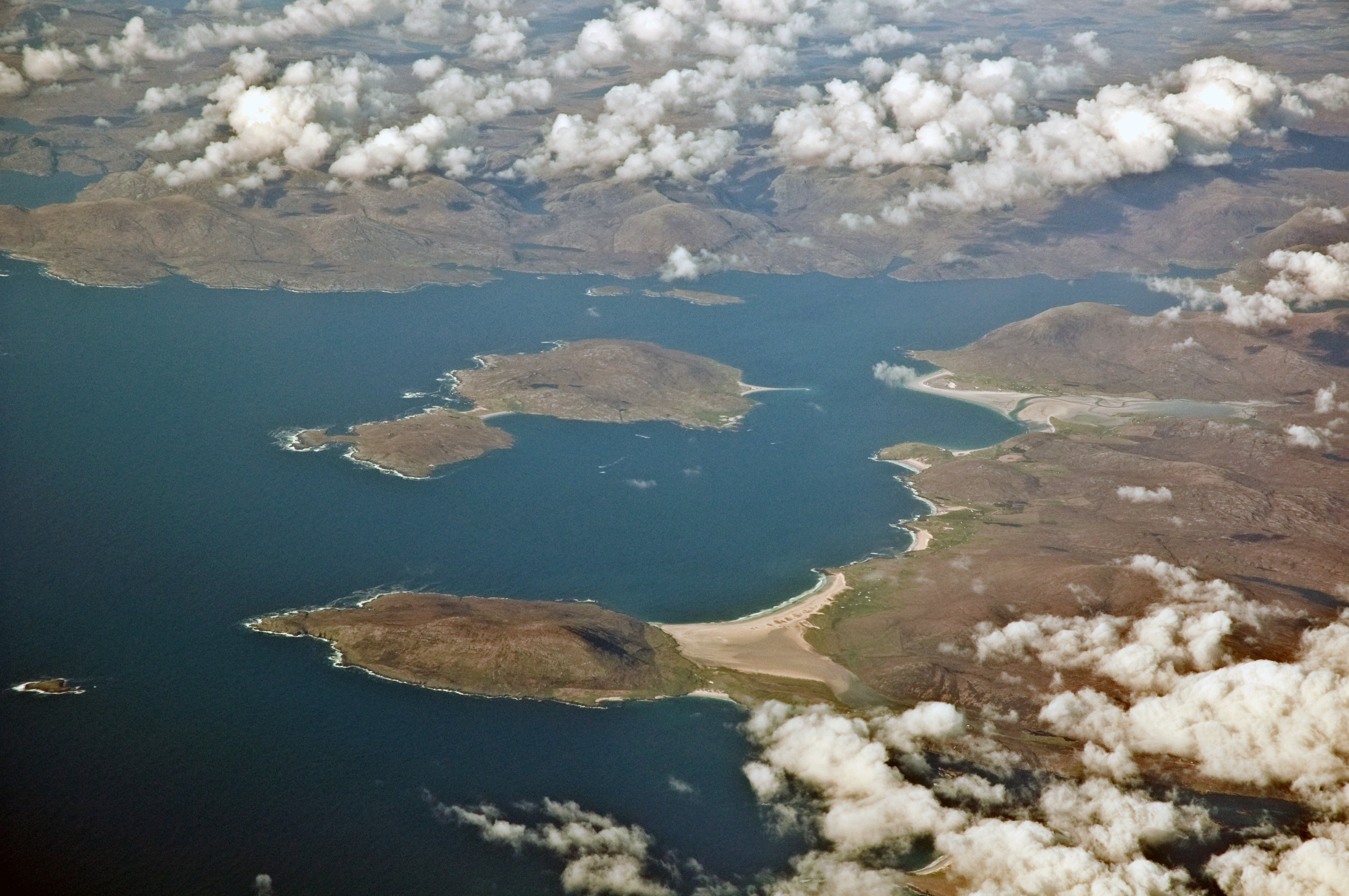
West Loch Tarbert and Taransay

West Loch Tarbert (Scottish Gaelic: Loch A Siar) is a sea loch that separates the northern and southern parts of Harris in the Outer Hebrides of Scotland. A small isthmus joins these two areas, on which is to be found the village of Tarbert. The loch contains the islands Soay Mòr, Soay Beag and Isay, while Taransay lies near the mouth of the loch. Amhuinnsuidhe Castle is located on the northern shore of the loch.
