= Harris Mountain (Nevada) =

Mountain in Nevada, United States

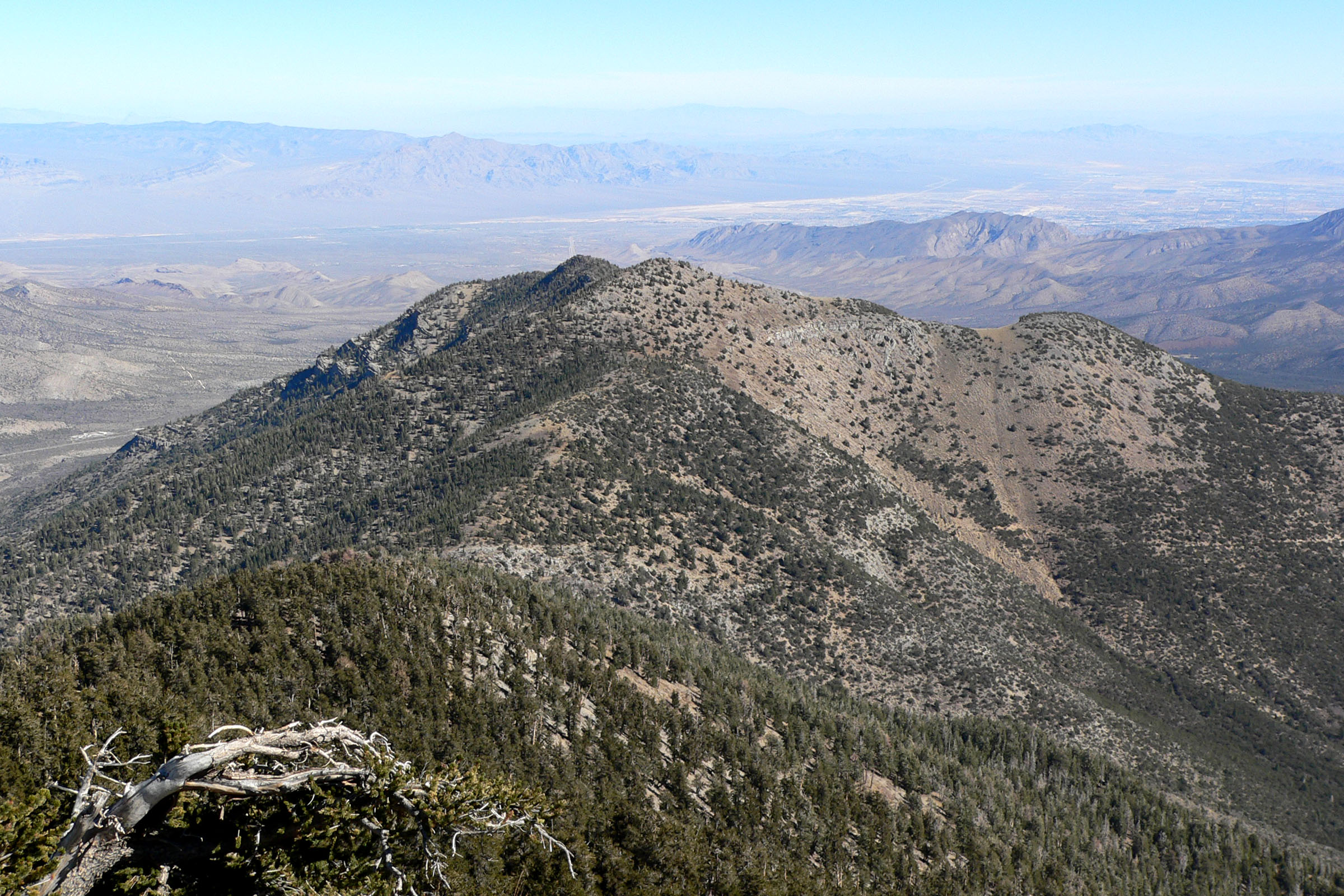
- Looking down on Harris Mountain from Griffith Peak

Highest point
- Elevation: 10,017 ft (3,053 m) NAVD 88
- Prominence: 925 ft (282 m)
- Coordinates: 36°14′29″N 115°36′41″W

Geography
- Location: Clark County, Nevada, U.S.
- Parent range: Spring Mountains
- Topo map: USGS La Madre Spring

Harris Mountain is a peak in the Spring Mountains of southern Nevada, USA. It is 29 miles (47 km) northwest of the Las Vegas Strip. It is in the Mount Charleston Wilderness.
