= Harris County =

Harris County may refer to:

- Harris County, Georgia, southwest of Metro Atlanta
- Harris County, Texas, the primary county of the Greater Houston metropolitan area
