= Harris Church of England Academy =

Harris CofE Academy
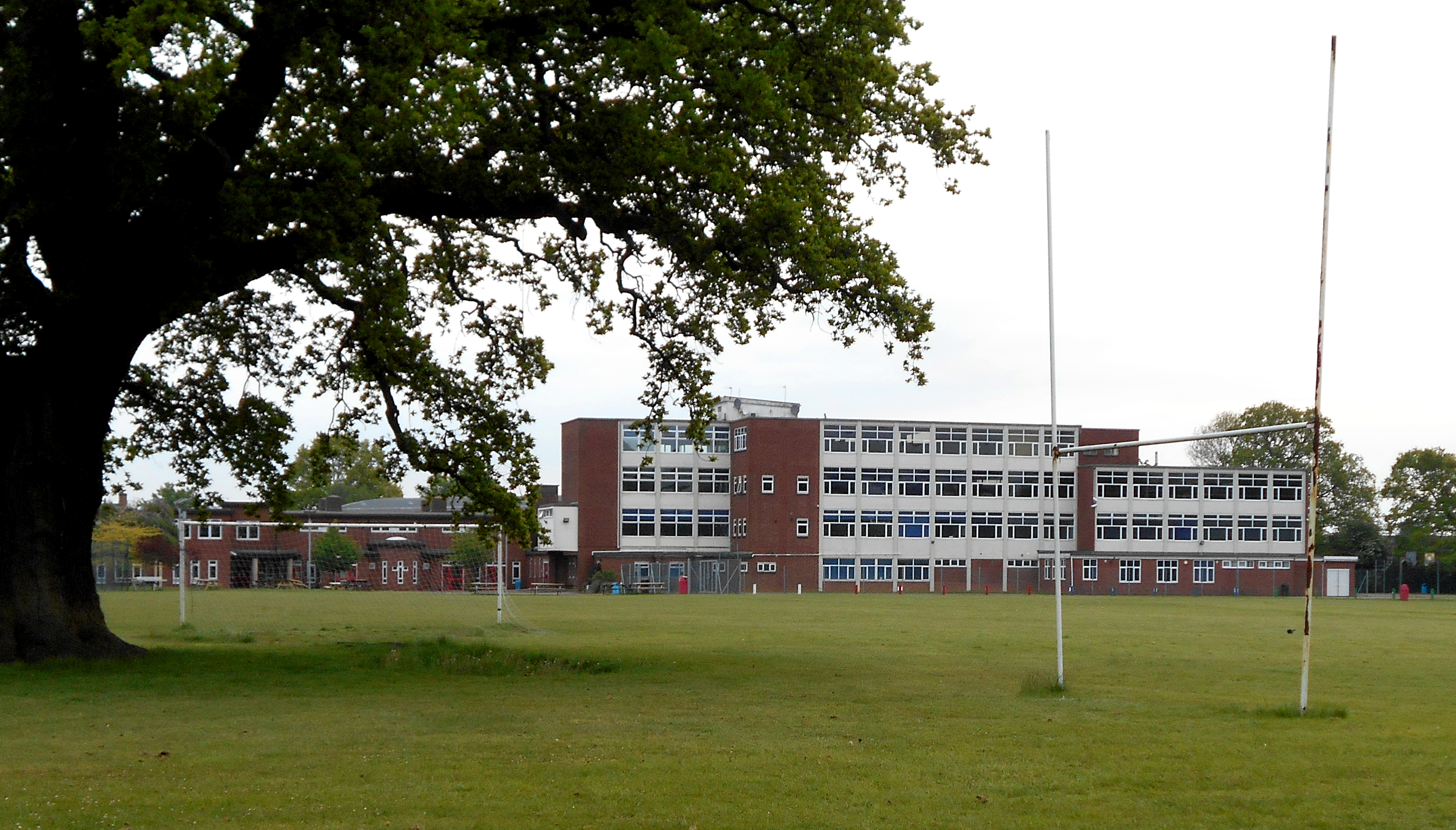

Location
- Harris Drive, Overslade Lane; Rugby, Warwickshire, CV22 6EA; England
- Coordinates: 52°21′46″N 1°16′16″W

Information
- Type: Academy
- Religious affiliation: Church Of England
- Department for Education URN: 140371 Tables
- Ofsted: Reports
- Headteacher: Roberta Harrison
- Gender: Coeducational
- Age: 11 to 16
- Enrolment: 754
- Website: http://www.harris-school.co.uk/

Harris Church of England Academy (formerly Harris School) is a coeducational Church of England secondary school With academy status, located in Rugby, Warwickshire, England. The school uses the colours black, gold and red. There were 748 students on roll in the 2014-2015 academic year, with 51 teachers and 22 teaching support posts (full-time equivalent).

In 2013 the school, then named Harris School, was placed in special measures after an Ofsted report deemed it "Inadequate". It converted to Academy status on 1 January 2014 and changed to its current name. Harris School is now no longer under special measures.

Now Harris is repeatedly over subscribed and rated as one of the best non-grammar secondary schools in the area of Warwickshire. Results in the drama, business and English department are consistently high as a result in the reform in leadership from 2012.

== Achievement ==
=== Number of students gaining 5+ A*-C grades at GCSE ===
- 2012: 36%
- 2013: 50%
- 2014: 54%
- 2015: 47%
