= Linkville, Indiana =

Unincorporated community in Indiana, U.S.

Coordinates: 41°24′58″N 86°17′13″W

Linkville is an unincorporated community in Marshall County, Indiana, in the United States.

== History ==
Linkville was founded in 1866 by M. J. Link and others. A post office was established at Linkville in 1884, and remained in operation until it was discontinued in 1903.
