= North Township, Marshall County, Indiana =

North Township
- Township
- Location in Marshall County
- Coordinates: 41°25′59″N 86°17′30″W
- Country: United States
- State: Indiana
- County: Marshall

Government
  - Type: Indiana township

Area
  - Total: 41.93 sq mi (108.6 km^{2})
  - Land: 41.77 sq mi (108.2 km^{2})
  - Water: 0.17 sq mi (0.44 km^{2}) 0.41%
- Elevation: 833 ft (254 m)

Population (2020)
  - Total: 4,054
  - Density: 103.5/sq mi (40.0/km^{2})
- ZIP codes: 46506, 46536, 46537, 46563
- GNIS feature ID: 0453678
- Website: northtownship.org

North Township is one of ten townships in Marshall County, Indiana, United States. As of the 2020 census, its population was 4,054 (down from 4,321 at 2010) and it contained 1,640 housing units.

North Township was established in 1836.

== Geography ==
According to the 2010 census, the township has a total area of 41.93 square miles (108.6 km^{2}), of which 41.77 square miles (108.2 km^{2}) (or 99.62%) is land and 0.17 square miles (0.44 km^{2}) (or 0.41%) is water.

=== Cities, towns, villages ===
- La Paz

=== Unincorporated towns ===
- Harris at 41.414768°N 86.303617°W
- Linkville at 41.416157°N 86.286950°W

(This list is based on USGS data and may include former settlements.)

=== Cemeteries ===
The township contains three cemeteries: Fairmount, Mount Zion (County Line), and White. Fairmount is the oldest cemetery in Marshall County, established in 1834. The first white child in Marshall County is buried at Fairmount. A Potowatomi Indian child is also buried in the cemetery.

=== Major highways ===
- US 6
- US 31

== School districts ==
- LaVille Community Schools

== Political districts ==
- Indiana's 2nd congressional district
- State House District 17
- State Senate District 9

== Elected officials ==
- Township Trustee: Emily Haskins (Term 2022–2026)

=== Advisory Board members ===
- Steven Davenport (Term 2022–2026)
- Stephen Barber (Term 2022–2026)
- Board Member Position Vacant
