= Burn Bullock =

Burn Bullock may refer to:

- Burnett Bullock, an English cricketer
- The Burn Bullock (public house), named after the cricketer.
