= William Greenleaf =

William Greenleaf may refer to:

- William Greenleaf (American scientist) (born 1979), professor of genetics at the Stanford University School of Medicine and co-inventor of ATAC-seq
- William Greenleaf (American novelist) (born 1948), author of 1980 sci-fi novel Time Jumper
- W. H. Greenleaf (1927–2008), British political scientist and author of The British Political Tradition
- William Greenleaf Eliot (1811–1887), American civic leader and founder of Washington University in St. Louis
