= London Buses route 152 =

London bus route

152
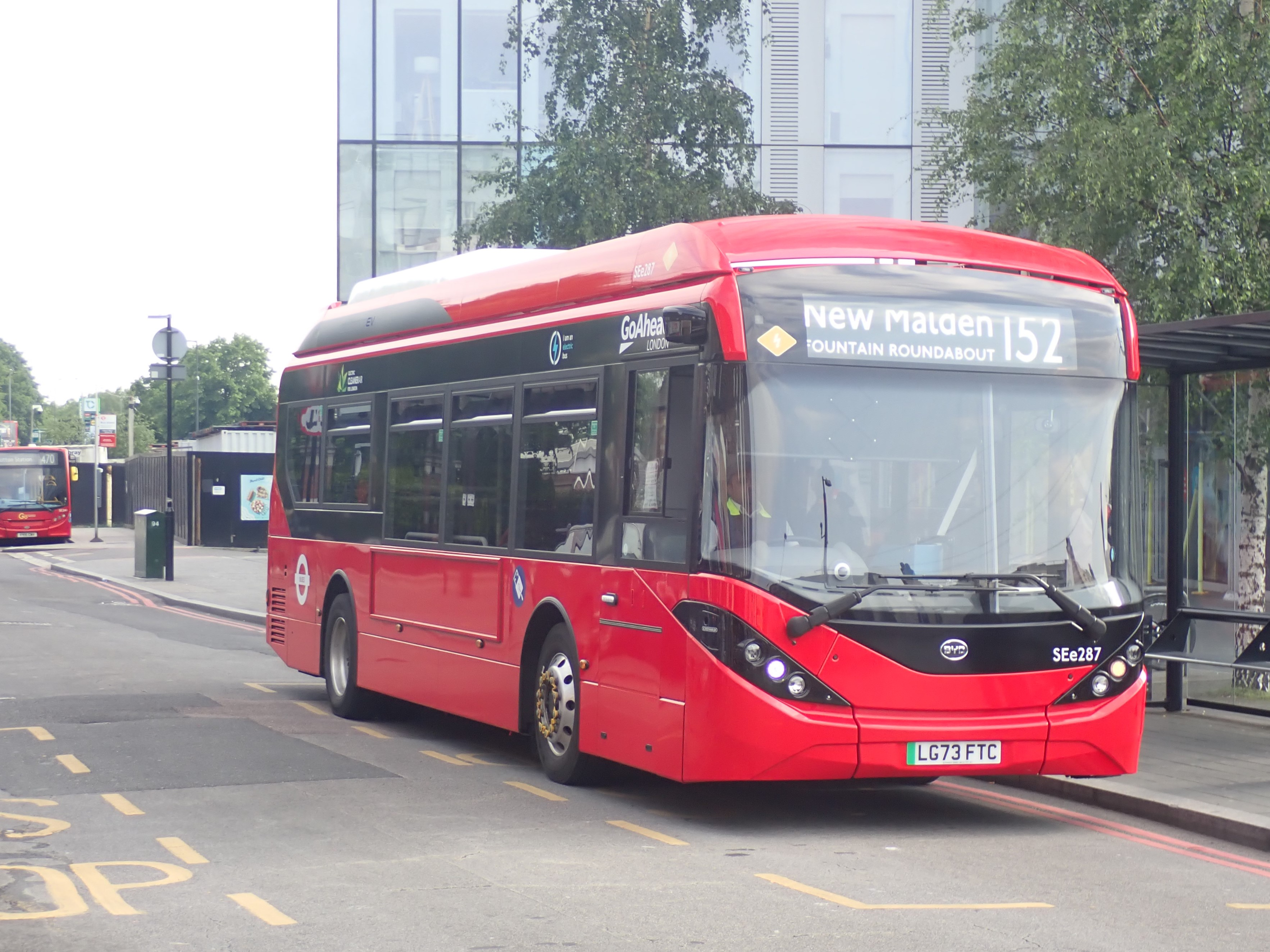
- London General BYD Alexander Dennis Enviro200EV in Colliers Wood in May 2024

Overview
- Operator: London General (Go-Ahead London)
- Garage: Merton
- Vehicle: BYD Alexander Dennis Enviro200EV
- Peak vehicle requirement: 14
- Night-time: No night service

Route
- Start: New Malden
- Via: Raynes Park; Wimbledon; Colliers Wood; Mitcham
- End: Pollards Hill
- Length: 8 miles (13 km)

Service
- Level: Daily
- Frequency: About every 12-20 minutes
- Journey time: 30-83 minutes
- Operates: 05:20 until 01:11

London Buses route 152 is a Transport for London contracted bus route in London, England. Running between New Malden and Pollards Hill, it is operated by Go-Ahead London subsidiary London General.

== History ==
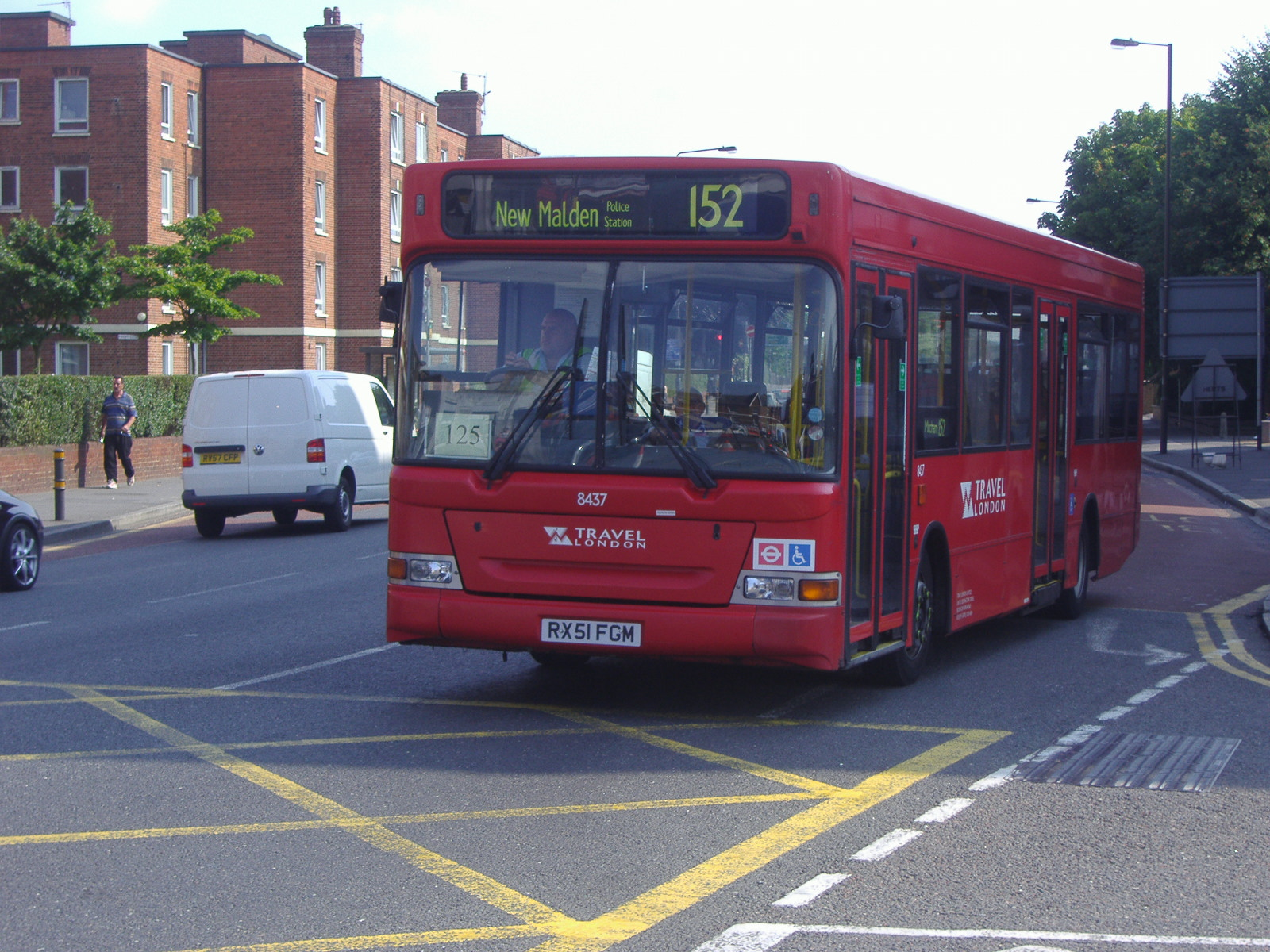
Travel London Plaxton Pointer 2 bodied Dennis Dart SLF in July 2008

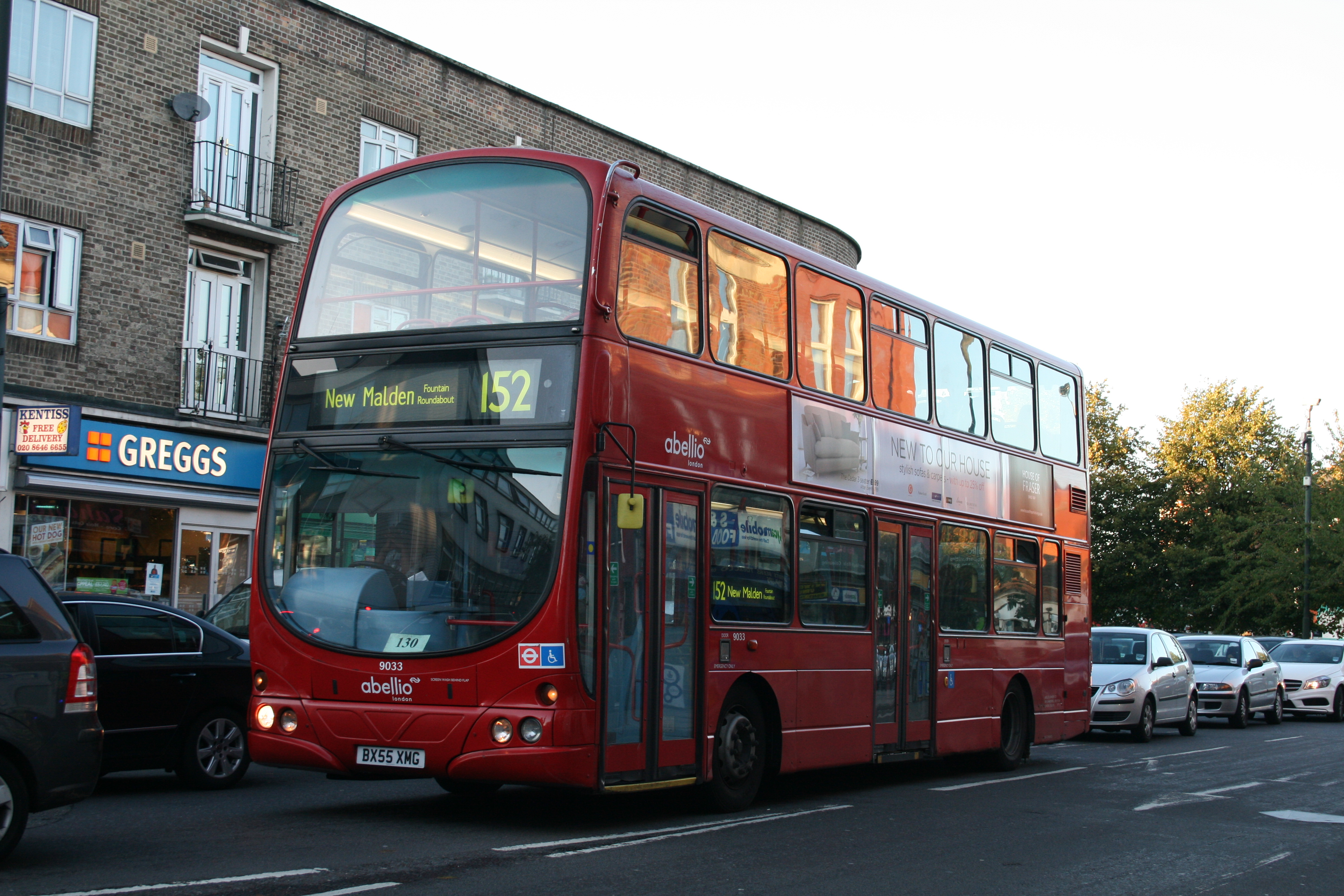
Abellio London Wright Eclipse Gemini bodied Volvo B7TL in Mitcham in October 2014

Route 152 originally operated from Mitcham Cricket Green to Kingston via Colliers Wood, South Wimbledon, Raynes Park, New Malden, Tolworth, Hook, and Surbiton. On 27 May 1936, it was diverted at Hook to Hampton Court station via Hinchley Wood. On 27 June 1951, route 152 was extended to Feltham station via Teddington, with Kingston garage gaining an allocation in addition to the existing Merton garage allocation. The route reverted to sole operation by Merton garage from 9 May 1962. It continued to run to Mitcham, running every 20 minutes.

The route reverted to sole operation by Merton garage from 9 May 1962. On 24 January 1970, it was diverted at Scilly Isles to Esher in lieu of Feltham. From the same date, the service was converted from AEC Regent III RT operation to one-man operation using single-deck AEC Merlins. From 18 May 1974, the service reverted to double-deck operation using Daimler Fleetlines. From 27 September 1980, the route was diverted at Tolworth to Surbiton station instead of Hampton Court, leaving the section of route to Hampton Court unserved except for some school journeys renumbered 152A. Under the major service cuts of 4 September 1982, single-deck operation returned to the route using Leyland Nationals.

On 27 June 1987, route 152 was withdrawn between Surbiton and New Malden, diverting instead via route 131 to Kingston. On 26 November 1988, operation transferred to Sutton garage as part of the 'Sutton Bus' local tender unit, but operation gradually moved back to Merton garage. On 30 November 1991 Merton garage resumed full control, and the route was converted to single-deck midibus operation using Optare MetroRiders. This change was made in order to facilitate an extension of the route to Pollards Hill via Eastfields Estate, an area long-deprived of a bus service and beyond the remit of larger vehicles due to roadwidth restrictions, one of the factors in earlier proposals such as the re-routing of route 118 being shelved.

On 30 November 1996, the route was converted to low floor operation with Dennis Darts. Upon being re-tendered, the route passed to Mitcham Belle on 1 December 2001. Route 152 was included in the 27 August 2004 sale of Mitcham Belle's Transport for London bus contracts to Centra.

Upon being re-tendered in 2006, route 152 passed to Travel London. Route 152 was included in the 21 May 2009 sale of Travel London to Abellio London who were awarded a further contract in May 2011.

In November 2014, a bus on the route caught fire, becoming the third bus to do so in a week. Abellio was accused of 'shocking maintenance'. The fire was believed to have been caused by the engine overheating.

When next re-tendered the route was awarded to London General who commenced operating it from Merton garage on 3 December 2016.

== Current route ==
Route 152 operates via these primary locations:

- New Malden
- Raynes Park station
- Wimbledon Chase station
- Merton Park tram stop
- South Wimbledon station
- Colliers Wood station
- Mitcham Eastfields station
- Pollards Hill
