= Pollards Hill =

Coordinates: 51.4040°N 0.1235°W

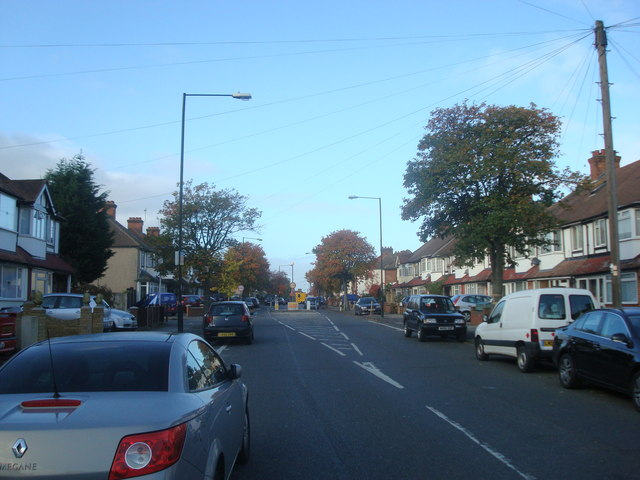
- Typical homes in Pollards Hill, London Borough of Merton

- Location within Greater London
- Population: 10,287 (2011 Census. Ward)
- OS grid reference: TQ299684
- London borough: Croydon; Merton
- Ceremonial county: Greater London
- Region: London
- Country: England
- Sovereign state: United Kingdom
- Post town: MITCHAM
- Postcode district: CR4
- Post town: LONDON
- Postcode district: SW16
- Dialling code: 020
- Police: Metropolitan
- Fire: London
- Ambulance: London
- UK Parliament: Mitcham and Morden; Croydon North
- London Assembly: Croydon and Sutton; Merton and Wandsworth

Pollards Hill is a small residential district straddling the south London boroughs of Croydon and Merton between Mitcham, Norbury and Thornton Heath. The boundary of the two boroughs is crossed by three streets which change name as each side was planned by modern local government systems, also leading to differing architecture. Pollards Hill lends its name to a ward of the London Borough of Merton.

== History ==
Four landmark maisonette blocks with eponymous side roads were built by Mitcham Borough Council (MBC) in the 1950s on Yorkshire Road: Westmorland Square (1950), Hertford Way, Berkshire Way and then Castleton Road (1956). That council dissolved in 1965 on incorporation into London. It also helped to meet the post-World War II housing shortage, wrought by the London Blitz, by building prefabricated ‘Arcon’ bungalows at Pollards Hill. The first were ready by January 1946, meant to last about 10 years. Many remained until the mid-1960s. The pre-fabs were mostly demolished in the 1960s, to make way for a new, quite high density, low-rise housing that was constructed by Merton London Borough Council and Wimpey Homes between 1967 and 1971.

A branch library and community centre were built, which received a design award.

== Governance ==
=== Councillors ===
Both sides of Pollards Hill elected Labour Party councillors at the last Council elections in May 2022. At present in the re-warding process used nationally for the regular election of local councillors, it lends its name to a ward of Merton London Borough Council.

=== UK elections (general elections and by-elections) ===
The Merton and Croydon areas in Pollards Hill have, since 1992 and 1997 respectively, seen their respective seats in London, wholly dependent by borough, return Labour MPs. The area has been represented by the Streatham and Croydon North and Mitcham and Morden constituencies since 2024, as a result of the 2023 Periodic Review of Westminster constituencies. In all elections since 1997, the two seats have returned Labour majorities greater than 28%.

== Geography ==
To the west (in Merton), at the foot of the hill, is the Pollards Hill estate stretching to Broad Green and Purley Way. A section of the estate was transferred to the ownership of Moat Homes housing association in 1998 under a stock transfer from the local authority. Moat has since demolished four maisonette blocks dating from the 1950s and is undertaking a wider regeneration of the stock.

To the east (in Croydon), covering the sides of the hill, are larger houses, stretching towards central Norbury. The roads are lined with pollarded lime trees.

Covering the crown of the hill is Pollards Hill Park, an open 7.75 acres (3.14 hectares), managed by Croydon Council, to whom it was donated in 1913. It is the highest point west of Norwood Ridge for as far as Epsom Downs and Kingston Hill/Richmond Park and can give views as far as Windsor Castle. A viewpoint at the top of the park indicates the direction of various landmarks.

== Education ==
In September 2006, Harris Academy Merton opened on the former site of Tamworth Manor High School. The academy is on the Merton side has a Croydon border. Tamworth Manor High School was originally Pollards Hill Secondary Modern School built in the 1950s, which became a comprehensive school, Pollards Hill High School, in 1968.

== Transport ==
The nearest railway stations are Mitcham Eastfields, Norbury, Streatham Common and Thornton Heath. Bus routes 60 and 255 serve the eastern Croydon area, and buses 152 and 463 serve the western Merton area.

== Demography ==
Pollards Hill is home to the largest Ghanaian British community in the UK on the Merton side according to the 2011 census, with 6% of the population and over 600 people born in Ghana. It has a large British Asian population on the Croydon side, and the area is home to many other different ethnicities and nationalities.

== Culture and community ==
Pollards Hill on the Merton side also contains a wide range of community facilities including a library, community centre, youth centre and a neighbourhood police station, the first in Merton.

In 2005, a community cycling club was set up with help from the Commonside Trust. It won the London Cycling Campaigns' award for Best Community Cycling Initiative in 2006.

== See also ==
- List of parks and open spaces in Croydon
- Mitcham Common
