= Lack Brothers =

Former department store in Croydon

Coordinates: 51.3988°N 0.0983°W

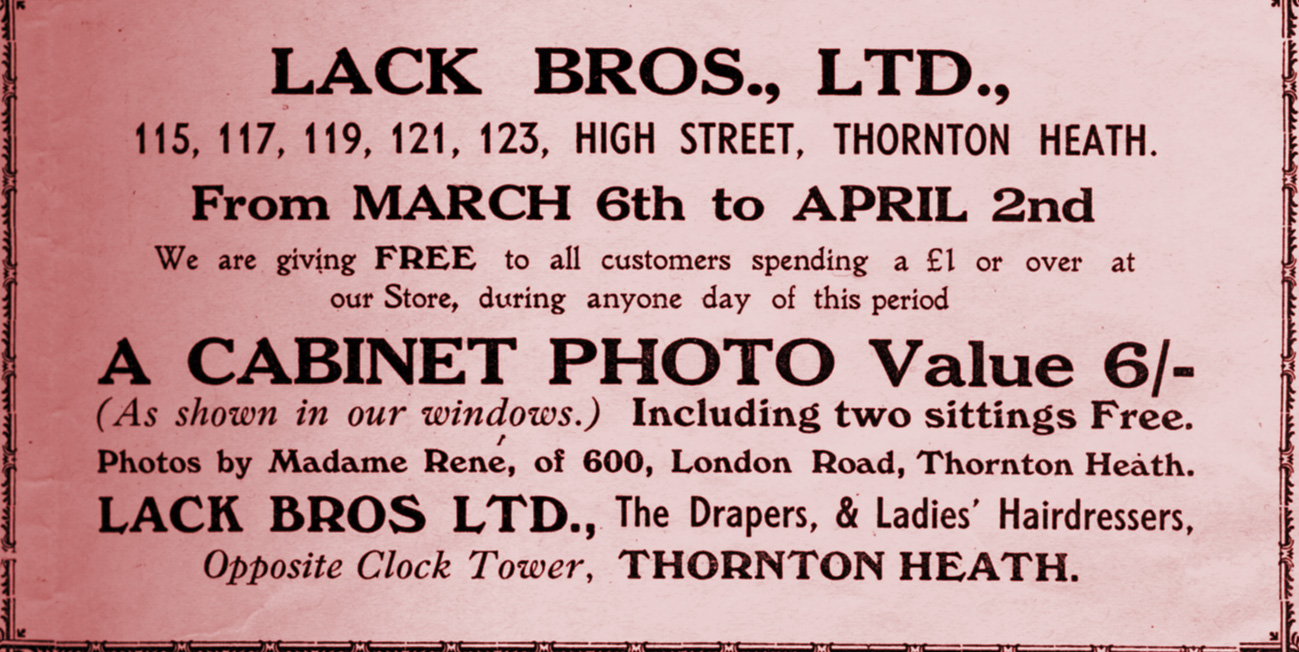
Advert for Lacks 1930

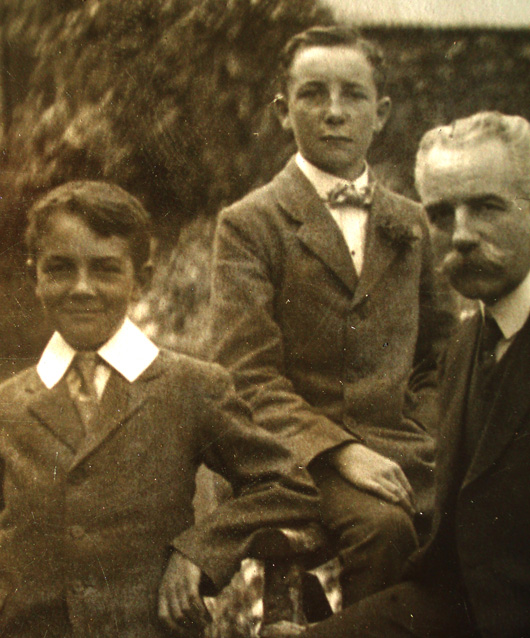
William J Lack on right, with his sons; Stanley and Charles in middle

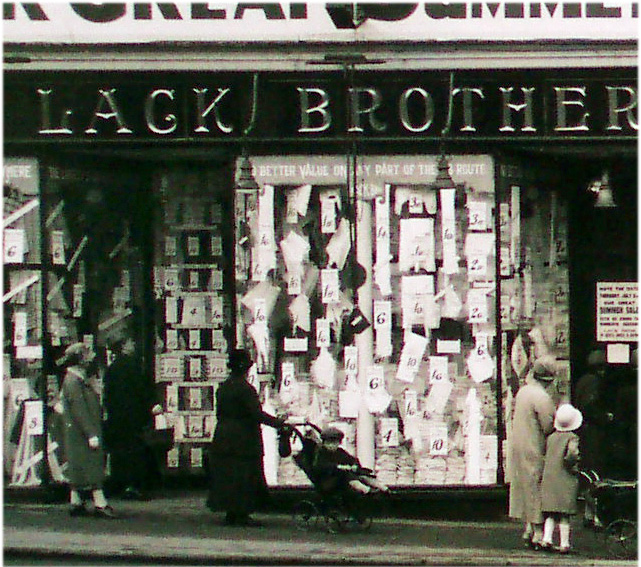
A close up the shop in 1926

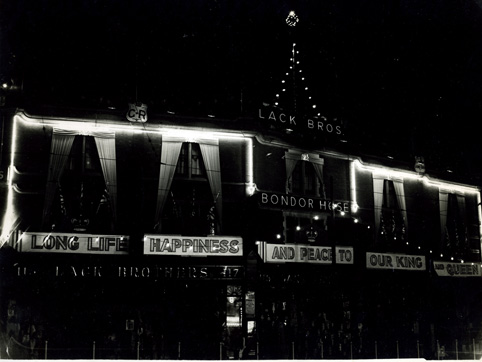
1935 decorations for George V jubilee celebrations

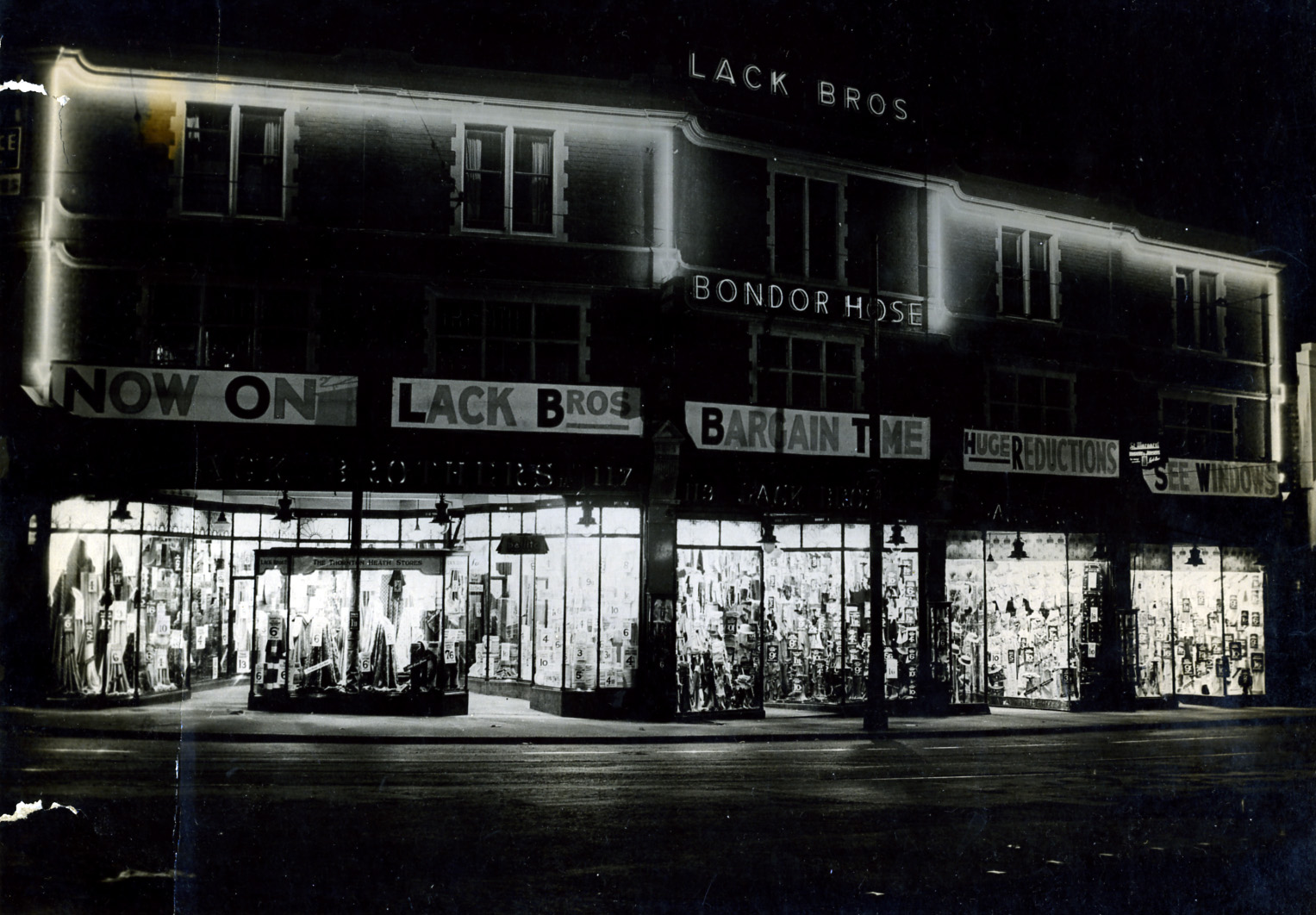
Lacks 1937 George V1 coronation

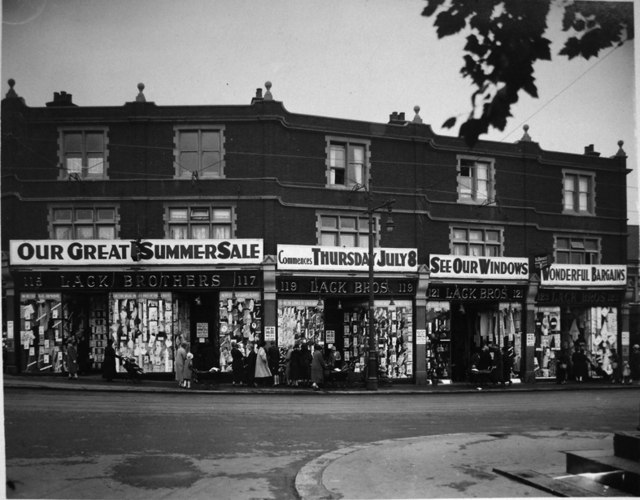
Lack Brothers at 115-123 Thornton Heath High Street, in summer 1926

Lack Brothers was a department store based in Thornton Heath in Croydon, England.

== History ==
Lack Brothers was started by William & Thomas Lack in Walthamstow, England in 1898, as a drapery business, with the Lack family, originally from Mitcham being involved with the linen business since the early 18th Century.

The business grew with the opening of a new store in Thornton Heath High Street in 1906.

The new store boasted a restaurant, a ladies hairdressers, millinery department and an amusement arcade, with early pin ball machines, in the basement. By 1927 the business had been incorporated and had expanded into neighbouring properties. It now occupied 115-123 High Street, Thornton Heath.

During the early 1930s the business boomed, with elaborate decorations for George V Jubilee, and for the coronation of George V1 in 1937. The store had a Lamson air tube system for cash transference. https://pneumatic.tube/the-lamson-pneumatic-tube-system-at-jacksons-of-reading-uk

However neither of William J. Lack's, privately educated two sons; Charles and Stanley, subsequently really wanted to continue the family business, after their father's death aged 65, in 1936 and by 1938 the store had closed.
