= Eastfields =

Area of South London, England

Coordinates: 51°24′30″N 0°09′14″W

Eastfields is an area of South London situated between Mitcham and Streatham. The area is home to St Mark's Academy (formerly known as Eastfields and then Mitcham Vale) secondary school and to Mitcham Eastfields railway station, which opened on 2 June 2008. The area has two council estates, Laburnum and Eastfields Estate, 5 minutes away from each other. The area is covered by the postcodes CR4 and SW16.

== Transport and locale ==
=== Nearest places ===
- Mitcham
- Norbury
- Streatham
- Tooting
- Colliers Wood
- Croydon
- Thornton Heath
- Pollards Hill

=== Nearest stations ===
- Mitcham Eastfields railway station
- Mitcham Junction railway station
- Mitcham tram stop
- Tooting railway station
- Norbury railway station
- Streatham Common railway station
