= Thornton Heath =

District of South London, England

Coordinates: 51.4002°N 0.1086°W

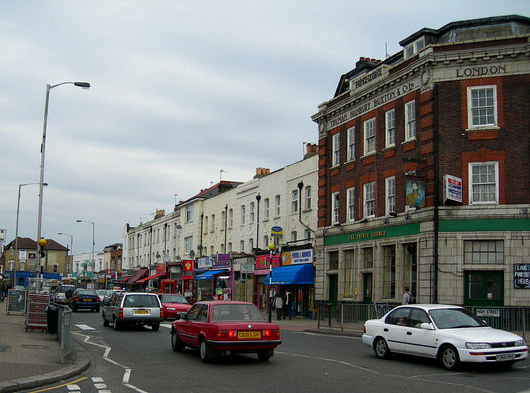
- High Street, Thornton Heath

- Location within Greater London
- Population: 65,812 (2011)
- OS grid reference: TQ315685
  - Charing Cross: 7.2 mi (11.6 km) N
- London borough: Croydon
- Ceremonial county: Greater London
- Region: London
- Country: England
- Sovereign state: United Kingdom
- Post town: CROYDON
- Postcode district: CR0
- Post town: THORNTON HEATH
- Postcode district: CR7
- Dialling code: 020
- Police: Metropolitan
- Fire: London
- Ambulance: London
- UK Parliament: Streatham and Croydon North Croydon West
- London Assembly: Croydon and Sutton

Thornton Heath is a district of South London, England, within the London Borough of Croydon. It is around 1.5 miles (2.4 km) north of the town of Croydon, and 7.2 miles (11.6 km) south of Charing Cross. Prior to the creation of Greater London in 1965, Thornton Heath was in the County Borough of Croydon.

== History ==
Until the arrival of the railway in 1862, Thornton Heath was focused on an area 1.5 miles (2.4 km) southwest of the Whitehorse manor house (now a school), at the locality on the main London–Sussex road known as Thornton Heath Pond in the parish of Croydon St John the Baptist. Between the manor house and pond was an isolated farmhouse. Eventually, it became the site for the railway station and the main expansion hub.

In the 50-year period from 1861 to 1911, Thornton Heath saw a complete transformation from an isolated rural outpost to an integrated metropolitan suburb. In its infancy, a new railway station in the eastern farmlands enabled the immediate area to evolve around a central point. In the late 19th century, the western part of Thornton Heath, which lay directly on the main London–Sussex road, demonstrated a classic form of suburban ribbon development. In the process, it became the final piece in an urban chain linking two major centres, London and Croydon, completing the greatest metropolitan expansion in the world at that time which cost £112 million in today's money.

== Geography ==
The nearest places are Mitcham, Croydon, South Norwood, Norbury, Pollards Hill, Selhurst, Upper Norwood, and Eastfields.

Geologically, some areas have clay-heavy soil, including Norbury and South Norwood. There is the gravelly, fertile soil in parts of the Thornton Heath area, which explains why market gardening and gravel extraction were major industries.

== Transport ==
=== Bus ===
Thornton Heath is served by London Buses routes 50, 60, 64, 109, 130, 198, 250, 289, 450, 468 and SL6, plus night routes N68, N109, and N250 and school route 663. Thornton Heath bus garage, owned by Arriva London, is at the junction of London Road and Thornton Road, known as Thornton Heath Pond.

=== Rail ===
Thornton Heath railway station is on the London Victoria branch of the Brighton Main Line, and is operated by Southern. Other stations nearby are Selhurst, the next station down, and Norwood Junction, on the East London line of the London Overground.

== Culture and architecture ==
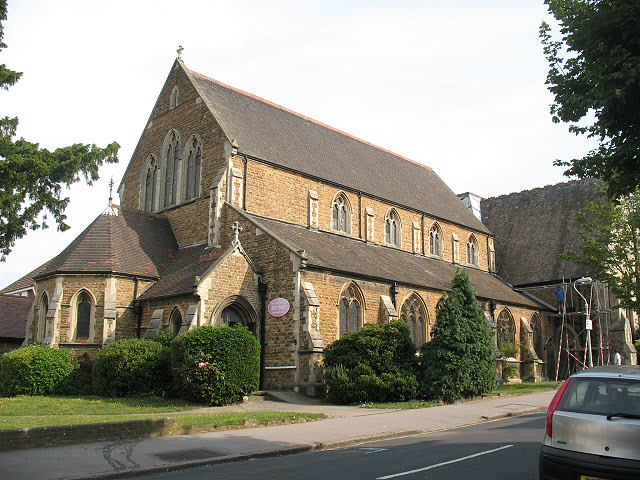
St Paul's Church, Thornton Heath

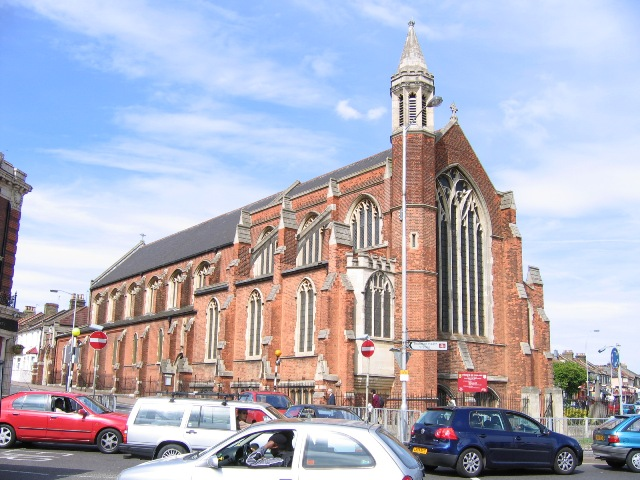
St Alban's Church, Grange Road, Thornton Heath

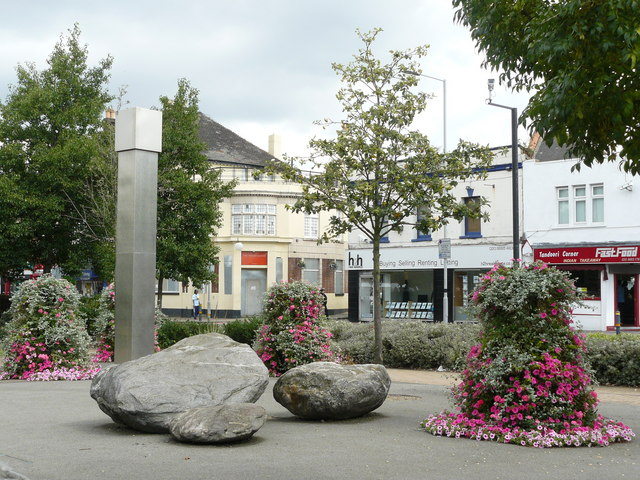
Decorative features at former Thornton Heath Pond

Architecturally, Thornton Heath is predominantly Victorian in both its residential and commercial sectors. There are a number of imposing, even grand, buildings surviving from this period.

Two examples are St Paul's Church and St Alban's Church. St Alban's is an Anglican church and is listed as Grade II. Built in 1889, it was the first church designed by the late Victorian architect Sir Ninian Comper. It is situated on the busy junction of Grange Road and the High Street. It is described as being of a red-brick perpendicular style with stone dressing.

At the junction of the High Street and Parchmore Road, on a site previously called Walker's Green, stands the Clocktower, which was built in 1900, and financed partly by public subscription.

However, the Victorian baths did not survive, and were replaced by a modern sports and leisure centre in 2004. It cost £8 million with £2.8 million from the British National Lottery Good Causes Fund through Sport England.

Several small and large blocks of flats have been built in the area, in a similar style. A large one is Crystal Court, adjacent to the Leisure Centre. There was an intense fire there. Although the building had passed safety checks, residents were concerned about the role of the cladding. This is being replaced.

Architects have posted about their project in the Library with a Council remit to refurbish and extend the Edwardian building, in particular, to improve access. There was also work as part of the regeneration project of the High Street to the Library on Brigstock Road.

In 2019, there was a contest organised by the Thornton Heath Community Action team for a planned redesign of the central area; it was won by architecture students.

== Demography and economics ==
Thornton Heath has a high degree of ethnic diversity with a large proportion of people from a BAME background. In the 2011 census, Thornton Heath (comprising the wards of Bensham Manor, Thornton Heath, and West Thornton) was Black or Black British (36.4%), White or White British (27.4%), Asian or Asian British (25.9%), mixed/multiple ethnic groups (7.1%), and other ethnic groups (6.6%). The largest single ethnicity is White British (20.2%) followed by British African-Caribbean people (17.6%). The average house price from sales in March 2023 was £421,433.

Sales numbers and house prices in Thornton Heath - March 2023
Property type	Number of sales last 12 months	Average price achieved last 12 months	Average price change per square foot last 12 months
Detached	15	£596,912	31.1%
Semi-detached	83	£487,110	-1.4%
Terraced	400	£421,433	6.3%
Flat / Apartment	343	£247,225	3.1%

== Sport and leisure ==
Thornton Heath gained a new leisure centre in May 2004. Its popularity was such that turnstiles had to be fitted to improve security. The centre is owned by Croydon Council, but was originally run by Parkwood Leisure, and now run by Fusion Lifestyle in partnership with the council.

Thornton Heath is one of the railway stations used by visitors to Selhurst Park stadium, home of Premier League club Crystal Palace.

Thornton Heath formerly had a Non-League football club, Croydon Athletic, which played at the Keith Tuckey Stadium; the club ceased to exist at the end of the 2010–11 season. In 2012, fans of the club formed AFC Croydon Athletic, which plays at the Mayfield Stadium. In 2015, the club competed in the Southern Counties East League. The reformed 5-time FA Cup winners Wanderers FC currently play at Thornton Heath.

Thornton Heath is also home to the historic rugby club Streatham-Croydon RFC founded in 1871. Their grounds and clubhouse are located in Frant Road off Brigstock Road.

There are three parks in Thornton Heath: Grangewood Park, Thornton Heath Recreation Ground, and Trumble Gardens.

The 2012 Olympic torch was taken along the High Street and Brigstock Road.

== Health ==
Thornton Heath healthcare is part of Croydon Health Services NHS Trust. GP practices are independent and receive NHS funding. The Council covers some health services such as public health. It has sole responsibility for social services.

The local hospital is Croydon University Hospital (formerly Mayday Hospital). It was assessed in 2021 by the Care Quality Commission as "requiring improvement" overall. However, some specific services were rated as "good".

== Community ==
Thornton Heath Community Action Team was formed in 2014 by a group of residents and businesses. Its aim is to deliver projects and to improve the area, such as organising litter picks, planting new plants, and a community Christmas tree. Members of the community have a garden in part of a local park and are maintain the planting area in the Ambassadors House forecourt. They also lobby and campaign on relevant local issues.

Sustainable Thornton Heath is a group of local people concerned about the environment.

Friends of Grangewood Park organise events and projects to improve the park, and encourage people to use it.

Facebook groups include Thornton Heath Community Action Team and Thornton Heath Local, a more general group. Both are private but easy for local people to join. In 2021, a Thornton Heath app, We are Thornton Heath, was created.

There is local news in the 'Thornton Heath Chronicle'.

There were Thornton Heath festivals for several years up to 2019.

The council had a regeneration plan for Thornton Heath. "Since 2016 we have been involving local people in an improvement programme, making the High Street and Brigstock Road more attractive, with funding from the GLA. This included new pavements and road improvements, upgrades to shop fronts, wall art by local artists along the high street, and improvements to the forecourt of Ambassador House".

In addition to the murals in the improvement programme, there are other artworks, such as a mosaic and mural at the station. An 'Art Trail' map was compiled as a guide.

== Notable residents ==
- Eric Barker, actor
- Alfred J. Bennett, artist
- Mary Berkeley, athlete
- Martin Butcher, cricketer
- Ashley Chin, actor
- Desmond Dekker, musician
- Del Dettmar, musician
- Jane Drew, architect
- Mickey Finn, musician
- Frankmusik, musician
- W. H. Greenleaf, political scientist
- D. J. B. Hawkins, philosopher
- Beth Hazel, swimmer
- Anne Hocking, writer
- London Hughes, comedian
- Christopher Louis McIntosh Johnson, journalist
- Wizz Jones, musician
- Simon Jordan, businessman
- Peter Ling, television writer
- Edward Lloyd, publisher
- David Payne, footballer
- Dickie Pride, musician
- Martyn Rooney, athlete
- Flora Sandes, soldier
- Steve James Sherlock, composer
- John Shuter, cricketer
- Paul Simonon, musician
- SL, rapper
- Emile Smith Rowe, footballer
- Stormzy, musician
- Don Weller, musician
- Wilfried Zaha, footballer
