= David Payne (footballer) =

English footballer

Personal information
- Date of birth: 25 April 1947 (age 79)
- Place of birth: Thornton Heath, England

Youth career
- 1964: Crystal Palace

Senior career*
Years	Team	Apps	(Gls)
1964–1973	Crystal Palace	284	(9)
1973–1978	Leyton Orient	93	(0)
Total		377	(9)

International career
1967	England U23	1	(0)
- * Club domestic league appearances and goals

David Ronald Payne (born 25 April 1947) is an English retired professional footballer, who played as a defender. He made 377 appearances in the Football League for Crystal Palace and Leyton Orient between 1964 and 1978. On retirement he joined the coaching staff at Millwall.

== Playing career ==
=== Crystal Palace ===
Payne began his playing career as an apprentice at Crystal Palace on 1 January 1964, signed professional terms on 26 October, and made his professional debut in December of that year aged 17. Although primarily a defender, his versatility saw him fulfil a number of roles in the Palace team. Payne made 30 appearances in the 1968–9 season, which saw Palace reach the top tier for the first time, and was a regular in the club's subsequent four seasons in the top flight making 27, 31, 41 and 39 appearances respectively. During this period, Payne was given eight different numbered shirts, at a time when shirt numbers equated to playing position.

=== Leyton Orient ===
In August 1973, he signed for Leyton Orient, at that time managed by former Palace coach and playing colleague, George Petchey. In 1974, he suffered a broken leg, but recovered to make a total of 93 appearances for Orient. He retired as a player, in 1978.

== Coaching career ==
On retirement he became youth team coach at Millwall helping them to win the F.A. Youth Cup in 1979, beating Manchester City 2–0 in the final.

== International career ==
Payne made one appearance, as a substitute, for the then contemporary England under 23 team (equivalent to the later England under 21 side) on 1 November 1967 against Wales.
