= Phipps Bridge =

Housing estate in Mitcham, London

Coordinates: 51°24′21″N 0°10′55″W

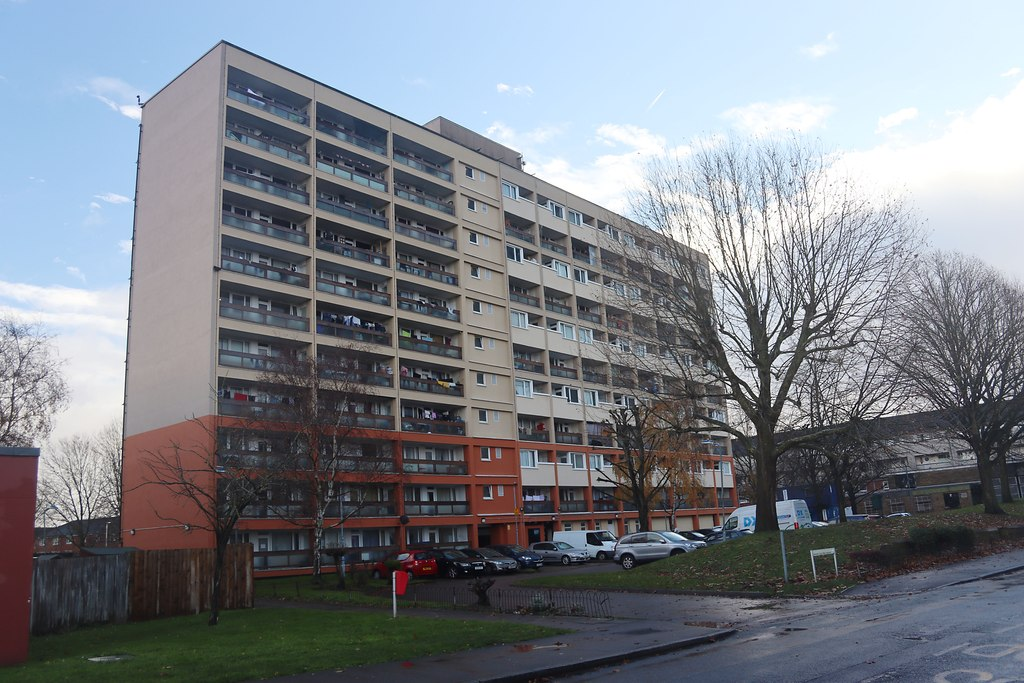

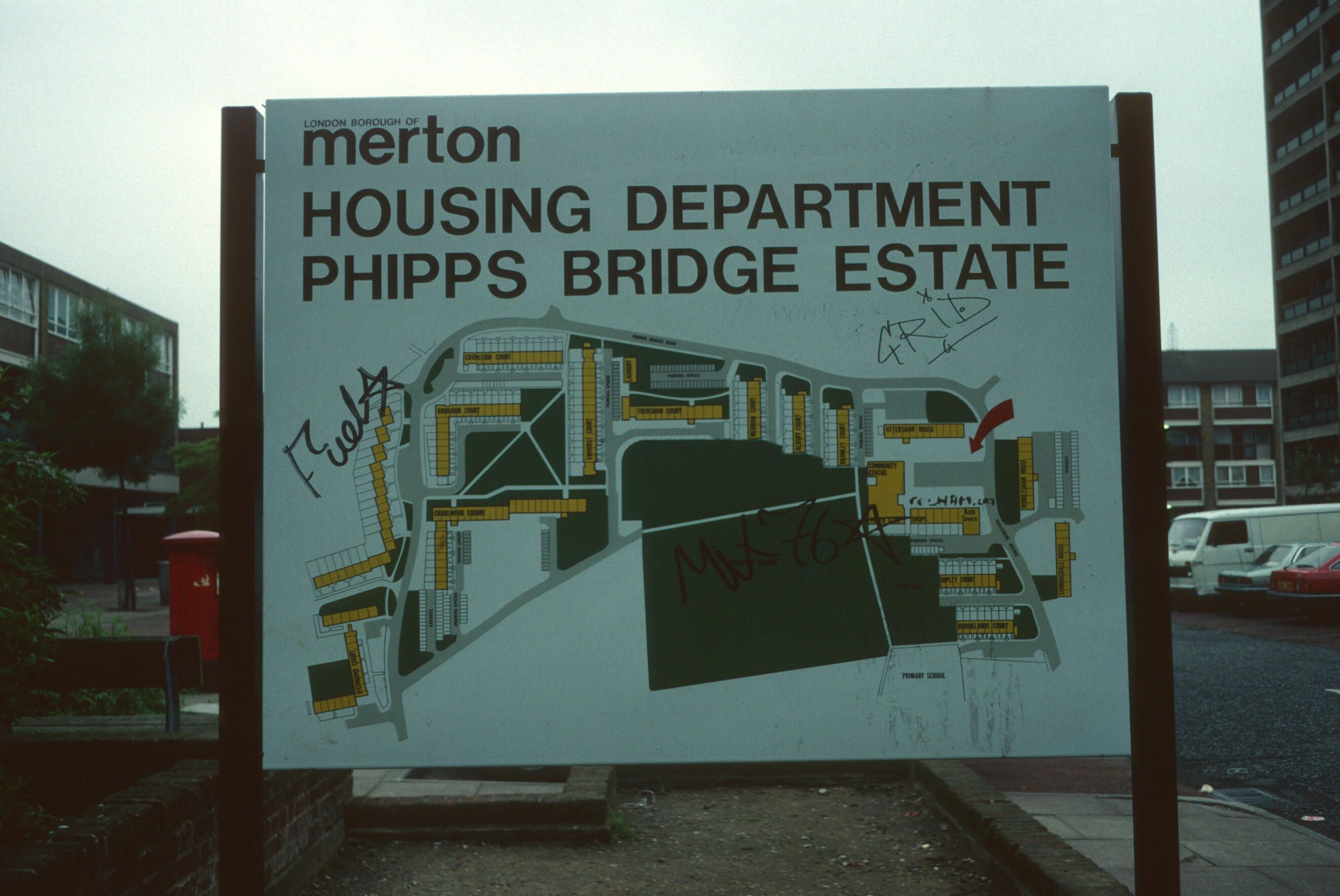
- A street sign showing a plan of the estate
- Interactive map of Phipps Bridge

General information
- Location: Mitcham
- No. of units: 776

Construction
- Constructed: 1950s-60s

Other information
- Governing body: Merton Council
- Famous residents: Kali Arulpragasam; M.I.A.

Phipps Bridge is a housing estate in Mitcham in the London Borough of Merton. It is named after a nearby bridge. It was built following the Second World War due to a need for new housing on the site of old slums. Although it opened in the 1960s as a showpiece estate, it took less than ten years for vandalism to become common. The Merton Council continued to redevelop it into the 1990s.

== History ==
Tinted postcard of the eponymous bridge in the 1900s

Phipps Bridge was built in the 1950s and 1960s on the previous site of a municipal refuse depot on Homewood Road and nearby streets of poor quality housing built in the late 19th century. It was a reactivation of the pre-war slum clearance programme of the Municipal Borough of Mitcham (later called the London Borough of Merton). It takes its name from a bridge over the nearby River Wandle, for which the first evidence documenting its existence was in the Valor Ecclesiasticus of 1535, which mentions a "Pypesbrige", which in turn likely derives its name from an association with a local family called Pipp. The current bridge dates to the mid-1950s and replaced a Bailey bridge from the Second World War.

After the war, new council housing was needed. All private building had been halted by the outbreak of war, and around the same time the stringent Rent and Mortgage Interest Restrictions Act 1939 was enacted, making the provision of new accommodations to rent completely uneconomic for the private landlord. In addition, the Municipal Borough of Mitcham had requisitioned many private houses during the war. These were mostly previously owned by servicemen due for demobilisation or others partaking in war work outside of Mitcham, and these would need to be returned to their owners. The building of temporary prefabricated bungalows in the mid-1940s provided slight relief, as did the erection of houses shortly after the war, but not until the demolition of Homewood Road depot was serious building work undertaken. The first blocks of high-rise flats opened to tenants in 1965.

The estate at the time comprised 776 units ranging from terraces of houses to four-story blocks of maisonettes, five-story and six-story blocks of flats, as well as a pub (which became a surgery in 1996 following a shooting). Although Phipps Bridge was intended as a showpiece estate, with the Civic Society organising coach tours during summer 1965 to foster a better awareness of the area, allocation of these units was based strictly on need.

== Redevelopment ==
Although the estate had only housed tenants from the late 1960s, in the early 1970s an attempt was made by various council departments to appease residents with promises of "more than £60,000" being spent on building a youth centre, playing fields, and a children's playground.

Phipps Bridge was widely considered undesirable at the time. A fire and consequent explosions at a nearby gas storage depot in 1970 considerably damaged many nearby houses, and it was not until the end of the decade that the councillors agreed on what to do about the issue of having industry so close to the estate. In addition, a "cockroach invasion" took place in 1976. In 1978, the then-decade-old Phipps Bridge Primary School changed its name to Haslemere Primary School to try and rid itself of the stigma attached to the name.

Several redevelopments took place in the 1970s. One of these was a former sports ground, which at the time was being used for coal storage. Work began after travellers and other itinerants were forcibly removed by a court order. Another re-development was a former rail siding, whose purchase from British Rail took over three years. A third renovation demanded the demolition of nearly 80 houses from the mid-19th century. These renovations continued into the 1980s, with emphasis being predominantly on houses and small blocks of maisonettes arranged in closes or quiet cul-de-sacs, as was vogue at the time.

The problems of the old Phipps Bridge estate, particularly of the high-rise flats, remained. Writing in 2005 for an article on ex-resident M.I.A., Robert Wheaton described life in Phipps Bridge by the mid-1980s as "an experience in misery", and noted that "television cop shows used the estate to film scenes depicting the most run-down, graffiti-stained dead-end estates in the country". One resident noted that the leaders of the National Front lived there, and as such had their offices and meetings there. Punk poet Sue Johns - who lived on the estate at the time - wrote in a poem of "the piss-filled lift", "the shells of wrecked cars", and "fifties design faults holding on / by the skin of their teeth in the eighties" She referenced residents waiting for a long-promised redevelopment "behind Chubb locks and net curtains". This redevelopment would take place in 1993, when Merton Council resolved to replace four of the five 1960s high-rise blocks with 346 new dwellings of various sizes, of which about 60% were houses, and renovate the final high-rise block as well as the low-rise properties forming the original development.

== Crime ==
Phipps Bridge has a reputation for having a high crime rate. In 2010, the chairman of the Residents' Association described the area as "out of control" after a spate of violent attacks occurring in quick succession. In 2013, seventeen people were sentenced for selling Class A drugs on the children's play area. The estate was described in an article about former resident M.I.A. as "one of south London's most notorious crime vortexes".As of 2025, the crime rate of the Phipps Bridge area is 134 crimes per capita. For comparison, London overall has a crime rate of 129 crimes per capita.

== Notable residents ==
Rapper M.I.A. and jewellery designer Kali Arulpragasam moved to the estate with their sibling and mother in July 1986 as refugees from the Sri Lankan civil war. Their family was one of only two Asian families that lived on the estate at the time. Maya Arulpragasam said about the estate in a 2004 interview that her family was "one of the two Asian families that lived there [and] I used to come home from school and see people burgling my house, just walk past with my telly. But it wasn't as horrible as being in Sri Lanka". The 2018 documentary Matangi/Maya/M.I.A. followed her home life on the estate.

The 19th century cricketer John Pratt died in the area.

== Transport ==
There were proposals for the West Croydon to Wimbledon Line to open a stop to serve the estate. In response, the board of British Rail announced in September 1979 that such a station would be financially nonviable. However, both Phipps Bridge tram stop and Belgrave Walk tram stop opened when Tramlink began service in May 2000.

London Buses route 200 began serving the estate in December 1966. Being the only bus to serve the area, residents protested after improvement works to Mitcham town centre caused the route's curtailment. In 2025, due to roadworks which resulted in a similar curtailment, a temporary route 700 was established between the estate and Colliers Wood, likely to mitigate the impacts highlighted in the previous protests.

== Bibliography ==
- Montague, Eric. Phipps Bridge. Mitcham Histories: 8. Merton Historical Society.
