= Mitcham Library =

Public library in London

Coordinates: 51.408437°N 0.162570°W

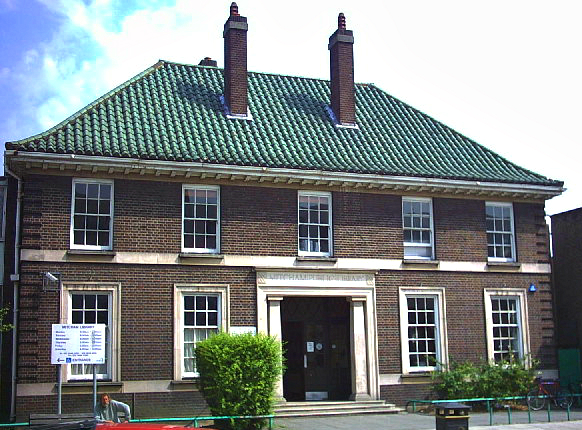
Mitcham Public Library, London Road, 28 June 2005

Mitcham Library is a public library in Mitcham, England, being one of the libraries of the London Borough of Merton. It was built in 1933 on land donated by a local builder, Mr Joseph Owen. In April 1932 he donated £4,025 towards its construction.

The original building was 60 feet (18 m) wide and 66 feet (20 m) long, and was built on the London Road in Mitcham, opposite the Holborn Schools. The reference library itself was 36 feet (11 m) by 25 feet (7.6 m), and the lending library 66 by 25 feet (7.6 m). Multi-coloured brick with stone facings was used throughout. Over the main entrance are the words, "Mitcham Public Library", neatly carved in the stonework, with stone cornice. Three steps lead to the approach, and a pillar is placed on either side of the entrance. The doors of the library were of Austrian oak. On the left hand side of the vestibule was the newspaper room, 20 feet (6.1 m) by 17 feet (5.2 m).

The initial stock of the library consisted of: lending department, 10,000 volumes costing £2,250; reference department, 1,500 volumes costing £750; junior department, 1,000 volumes costing £200.
