= D. J. B. Hawkins =

British philosopher and Catholic priest (1906–1964)

Denis John Bernard Hawkins (17 July 1906 – 16 January 1964) was a British philosopher and Catholic priest.

Hawkins was born in Thornton Heath and attended Whitgift School, Croydon. He obtained his doctorates in philosophy (1927) and theology (1931) from the Pontifical Gregorian University in Rome.

He was ordained a Catholic priest in 1930 for the diocese of Southwark. He was a parish priest in Claygate in 1940 and received an honorary canon of the diocese of Southwark in 1956. Hawkins was a neo-Thomist and updated Thomism with modern thought. He was influenced by the realism of Thomas Aquinas, that the human mind can know external reality. He also defended a form of direct realism and an intuitive perception theory. In a review, William Kneale described Hawkins' The Criticism of Experience as a restatement of the Scottish common sense school.

== Selected publications ==
- Causality and Implication (1937)
- Approach to Philosophy (1938)
- The Criticism of Experience (1945)
- A Sketch of Medieval Philosophy (1947, 1968)
- The Essentials of Theism (1950)
- Being and Becoming (1954)
- Crucial Problems of Modern Philosophy (1957)
- Man and Morals (1960)
- Christian Morality (1963)
