= David Gibson (cricketer) =

English cricketer (1936–2012)

Personal information
- Full name: David Gibson
- Born: 1 May 1936; Mitcham, Surrey, England
- Died: 7 June 2012 (aged 76); Bowral, New South Wales, Australia
- Batting: Right-handed
- Bowling: Right-arm fast-medium
- Role: Bowler

Domestic team information
- Years: Team
- 1957–1969: Surrey
- FC debut: 22 June 1957 Surrey v Oxford University
- Last FC: 12 August 1969 Surrey v Essex

Career statistics
Competition	First-class	List A
Matches	185	18
Runs scored	3,143	104
Batting average	18.93	17.33
100s/50s	0/11	0/0
Top score	98	29*
Balls bowled	29,341	1,015
Wickets	552	16
Bowling average	22.22	36.56
5 wickets in innings	26	0
10 wickets in match	1	0
Best bowling	7/26	3/42
Catches/stumpings	76/–	0/–
- Source: CricketArchive, 11 May 2008

David Gibson (1 May 1936 – 7 June 2012) was an English cricketer who played for Surrey from 1957 to 1969. He was a fast-medium bowler who captured over 500 wickets in his career, and also a useful enough batsman almost to rank as an all-rounder. He was also a fine rugby player, appearing at county level and in schoolboy internationals.

His cricket career, though reasonably successful, could be considered an unlucky one. He never took 100 wickets in a season, but came close on several occasions. His best season with the bat saw him fall just four runs short of 1,000 runs. He never made a century, but had scores of 98 and 95 not out. Worst of all, he was struck down by an injury that all but finished his career just as he had appeared to have reached his peak.

== Early career ==
Gibson made a promising beginning in first-class cricket in 1957, taking ten wickets in a match against Gloucestershire, in only his second appearance for the first team and on his debut in the County Championship. Taking ten wickets in a match was a feat that he would never repeat. In spite of this early success, with Alec Bedser and Peter Loader almost ever present as the opening bowlers, he made only one further appearance that season. However he could reflect that he had been a part, if a minor one, of the Surrey side that had won the Championship for an unprecedented sixth season in succession. In his three matches he had taken 17 wickets at an average of 15.58.

In 1958, Surrey won the Championship yet again, the last time that they would do so during Gibson's career. With Alec Bedser having to miss the first half of the season through pneumonia, Gibson had more opportunities. In 14 matches he took 37 wickets at 19.75. He also made his first fifty with the bat.

In 1959 he played in 22 matches, and captured 56 wickets. His average, however, was a disappointing 29.37. This may be at least partly explained by the fact that 1959 was the driest and sunniest summer for some years, so that conditions were more in favour of the batsmen. He himself managed 405 runs at 16.20, and improved his highest score to 80.

== Later career ==
In 1960, he had perhaps the best season of his career with the ball. In 27 matches he had 90 victims at 17.60. His innings figures of 7–26 against Derbyshire would remain his career best. With the bat he had 399 runs at 15.96, with a highest score of 95*.

He played in 24 games in 1961. Though his average declined to 22.30, he took 95 wickets, the closest he would ever get to reaching 100.

In 1962 he was only able to play in 7 matches, taking 19 wickets at 29.88. The next year, he played in 26 fixtures, and captured 77 wickets at 23.32. 1964 saw him appearing in 17 matches and taking 50 wickets at 23.86.

In recent years his batting had seemed to be in decline, and he had not made a fifty since 1961. But in 1965, in his 32 games he came within four runs of reaching his thousand for the season. His average was more than twice that in any previous season, and he made five fifties, one of them the highest score of his career of 98. His final tally was 996 runs at 34.34. He also had a fine season with the ball, with 86 wickets at 20.47, on nine occasions taking five or more wickets in an innings, with best figures of 6/11.

Seeming to be at the peak of his career, he had cartilage trouble at the start of the 1966 season. He was only able to play in a handful of matches thereafter – just one that season, eight in 1967, none in 1968 and four in 1969 – before being forced to retire. He did enough in his eight matches in 1967 to show what Surrey had been missing, with 300 runs at 37.50 and 18 wickets at 24.55.

He played in the Gillette Cup, a List A competition, from its inception in 1963 until he retired in 1969. However he had no outstanding performances. When Surrey reached the Final against Yorkshire in 1965 and were heavily defeated, he took 1/66 in the 13 overs that bowlers were then permitted, and scored a duck.

== Sources ==
- CricketArchive career statistics
- FC batting by season
- FC bowling by season
