= Alfred J. Bennett =

English painter

Alfred John Bennett (1861 – c.1923) was an English artist who worked in oils, watercolour and etching.

== Life and work ==
Bennett was born in London which became a major source of inspiration to the artist. His paintings, drawings and etchings, more often than not, depicted well known landmarks of the capital city. In December 1889 Bennett married Catherine Avery (They had one daughter, Mary Catherine) and spent a short amount of time living with her family in East Hyde, Bedfordshire. During this period Bennett worked as a Jeweller, whilst also regularly submitting paintings to the Royal Academy of which four were exhibited between 1861-1880.

After this success, Bennett left the jewellery trade and concentrated on his art, first moving to Thornton Heath, Surrey and then relocating his studio to Knebworth.

== Exhibitions ==
Bennett exhibited extensively, regularly contributing work to the Royal Watercolour Society (17 pictures) and British Institution (2 pictures) exhibitions. A further painting titled The Hill Farm was exhibited at the Royal Academy in 1916, and he achieved more success with solo and joint shows at the prestigious Walker's Gallery in New Bond Street, London in 1918 and 1923. In addition, he also exhibited works at the Fine Art Society, New English Art Club, Grosvenor Gallery, International Society, and the Royal Institute of Oil Painters.

Many of Bennett's works are found in public art collections, including two watercolours in the collection of Brighton Museum & Art Gallery.
