= Mitcham Vestry Hall =

Municipal building in London, England

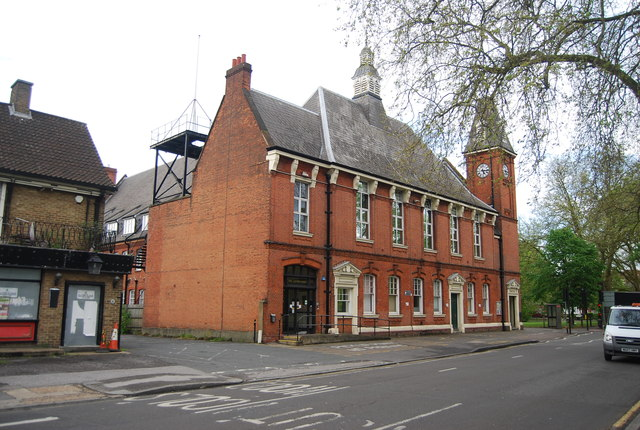
- Mitcham Vestry Hall

- Shown in Merton
- 51.4020°N 0.1680°W
- Location: London Road, Mitcham

History
- Built: 1887

Site notes
- Architect: Robert Masters Chart
- Architectural style: Victorian style

Mitcham Vestry Hall is a municipal building in London Road, Mitcham, London. It is a locally listed building.

== History ==
The building was commissioned as a vestry hall for the benefit of the Parish of St Peter and St Paul: the site selected for the building had previously been occupied by the local police and fire stations. It was designed by Robert Masters Chart in the Victorian style, and was officially opened on 18 May 1887. However, the vestry hall was described, in 1895, as a "red brick blot"...which had..."ruined for ever the picturesqueness of Mitcham of old".

The design involved an asymmetrical main frontage with seven bays facing onto London Road; it featured a doorway with pediment in the furthest right bay with a tall clock tower rising above; there were windows in each of the bays on the first floor; it had a steeply pitched roof with a cupola and weather vane. The old village lock-up which had formed the basement of the old police station was incorporated into the basement of the new building. The design also featured an entrance for the fire engine in the furthest left bay: the horse-drawn fire engine fire engine itself was replaced with an appliance made by Merryweather & Sons in 1912.

Urban expansion saw the immediate area become the geographical and administrative centre of the developing township in the late 19th century and the building became the council offices for the new Mitcham Urban District Council in 1915. A large extension to the west was completed in 1930 and, after the area achieved municipal borough status, the building became known as "Mitcham Town Hall" in 1934. A room on the first floor of the extension was designated for use as a courtroom in the 1930s and the main hall was used as a British Restaurant during the Second World War.

The building continued to serve as the headquarters of the Municipal Borough of Mitcham but ceased to be the local seat of government when the enlarged London Borough of Merton was formed in 1965. It was subsequently used as workspace by several departments of Merton Council including the Borough Treasurer's Department. However, after the council departments moved out in the 1980s, the building was refurnished and was revived as a community centre known as the "Vestry Hall". The building continues to be used for public meetings and is used by local community organisations working in the borough. In September 2014, the local NHS Clinical Commissioning Group held its first Annual General meeting there and, since 2019, Off The Record Youth Counselling delivers mental health services in the building.

The Wandle Industrial Museum, which was established at Worsfold House in Church Road in Mitcham in June 1983 to preserve artifacts associated with the River Wandle and its industrial heritage, moved to the annex in the grounds of the vestry hall in July 1989.
