= John Pratt (cricketer) =

English cricketer

John Pratt (4 February 1834 — 6 June 1886) was an English cricketer. He was a right-handed batsman and a right-arm roundarm medium-pace bowler. He was born in Stratford, Essex, and died in Phipps Bridge, Surrey, aged 52.

Pratt made a single first-class appearance, during the 1868 season, against Kent. He scored 9 runs in the first innings in which he batted, and a single run in the second. Pratt bowled three overs during the match, with limited success.

Pratt played cricket at county level for Surrey, Hampshire, and in 1866 in a single match for Shropshire while playing as club professional for Shrewsbury.

Pratt's brother-in-law, James Southerton, made two Test appearances, the first in the inaugural Test during the 1876–77 season.
