= Sunshine Way =

Coordinates: 51°24′33″N 0°9′52″W

Sunshine Way is the name of a crescent-shaped street in Mitcham, England, built in 1936 for families from overcrowded areas of inner London, and including specially designed houses to suit the needs of tuberculosis (TB) patients.

The houses date from a period of nationwide effort to build better accommodation for poorer people, and a growing awareness of the link between bad housing and health problems. The name Sunshine Way referred to the six special sunshine houses for people with a tendency to TB. Each house had a patio area in the roof where a patient could spend the night in the open air. Fresh air and sunlight were considered an important part of prevention and treatment before effective drugs were developed.

The site for Sunshine Way was bought by Church Army Housing Ltd. and the total cost including building the houses and a community hall came to £31,000 (about £1,400,000 in 2005 money, allowing for inflation).

The housing estate was officially opened on 20 November 1936 by Lord Horder, KVCO, and was blessed by the Bishop of Kingston. It consisted of 51 houses, 47 of which had three bedrooms and 4 had four bedrooms. Rents ranged from 8 shillings to 12 shillings and threepence a week, or the equivalent of £18 to £30 in 2005. Mr F.M. Elgood, chairman of the company, said that in the 51 houses were 277 children, 167 of them under 10 years old.

== The national context ==
The sunshine houses in Mitcham were designed at a time when special housing for tuberculosis patients was being built in several UK cities, and when there were many public schemes for rehousing poorer families. Houses with light and fresh air were seen as a remedy for health problems incubated in overcrowded city centre slums: "damp, dark dwellings whose windows the sun's rays have never penetrated and rarely reached by a draught of really pure air".

The end of World War I brought awareness of a national housing shortage and, in 1919, legislation to encourage house-building for poorer people (known as the "homes for heroes" Act). In the 1920s many city councils and other public bodies embarked on building projects. Along with voluntary associations, often supported by church leaders, they planned to provide healthy new housing. This was a continuation of late 19th century campaigns for better conditions for the urban poor - "Disease of the respiratory or breathing system is the natural scourge of the crowded quarters." – and a series of Acts of Parliament on the "Housing of the Working Classes", starting in 1885.

As in Sunshine Way, Mitcham, some inter-war housing was specifically designed for TB patients and their families. Leeds built hundreds of sunshine houses in the 1930s, with 10% of their new housing having specially large, wide-opening windows to increase the flow of fresh air. Sheffield, Middlesbrough, Salford and Glasgow were other places which made specific housing provision for people with TB. In 2010, Archive Global, a UK charity, commenced work on engaging residents in London about the role of housing/living conditions in the transmission of TB.
