= Municipal Borough of Mitcham =

Former local government area in the UK

Coordinates: 51°24′N 0°10′W

Mitcham
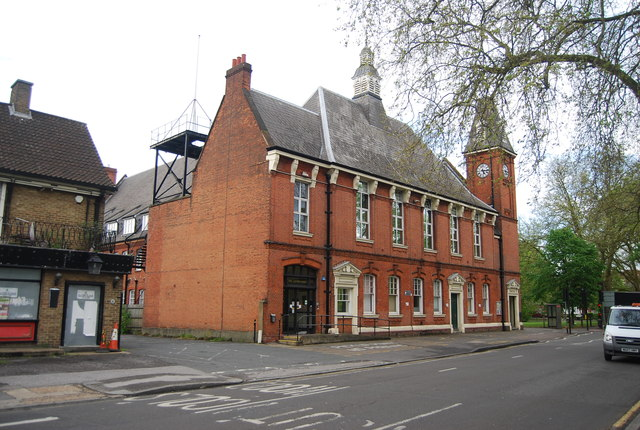
- Mitcham Vestry Hall
- History
  - Created: 1915
  - Abolished: 1965
  - Succeeded by: London Borough of Merton
- Status: urban district (until 1934) municipal borough (after 1934)

Mitcham was a local government district in north east Surrey from 1915 to 1965 around the town of Mitcham.

== History ==
Mitcham local government district was created in 1915 as an urban district from part of the abolished Croydon Rural District. It gained the status of municipal borough in 1934.

In 1965, under the London Government Act 1963, the municipal borough was abolished and its area combined with that of the Municipal Borough of Wimbledon and the Merton and Morden Urban District to form the present-day London Borough of Merton in Greater London.

== Coat of arms ==
The coat of arms of the municipal borough were granted in 1934 and defined as:

Shield

A pale vert (green central vertical band), representing the green of Mitcham. The centre has a fess wavy argent (silver wavy horizontal band) charged with a barulet wavy azure (blue narrow wavy bar) to indicate the ford of north Mitcham, which was once known as Whitford. Below the fess, a tower argent (silver tower) represents the great dwelling, from which Mitcham got its earlier name of Michelham. Above the fess, cross-keys and sword or (gold) represent Mitcham's patron saints, St. Peter and St. Paul. On each side of the pale is a sprig of lavender proper (in its natural colour).

Crest

Three sprigs of lavender on a wreath or and vert entwined by a mural coronet (wall-like crenellated crown, indicative of municipal status).

Motto

"Mitcham Faeste Gestandeþ" - Mitcham stands fast (Old English).
