= Off The Record Youth Counselling =

Mental health charity in London, England

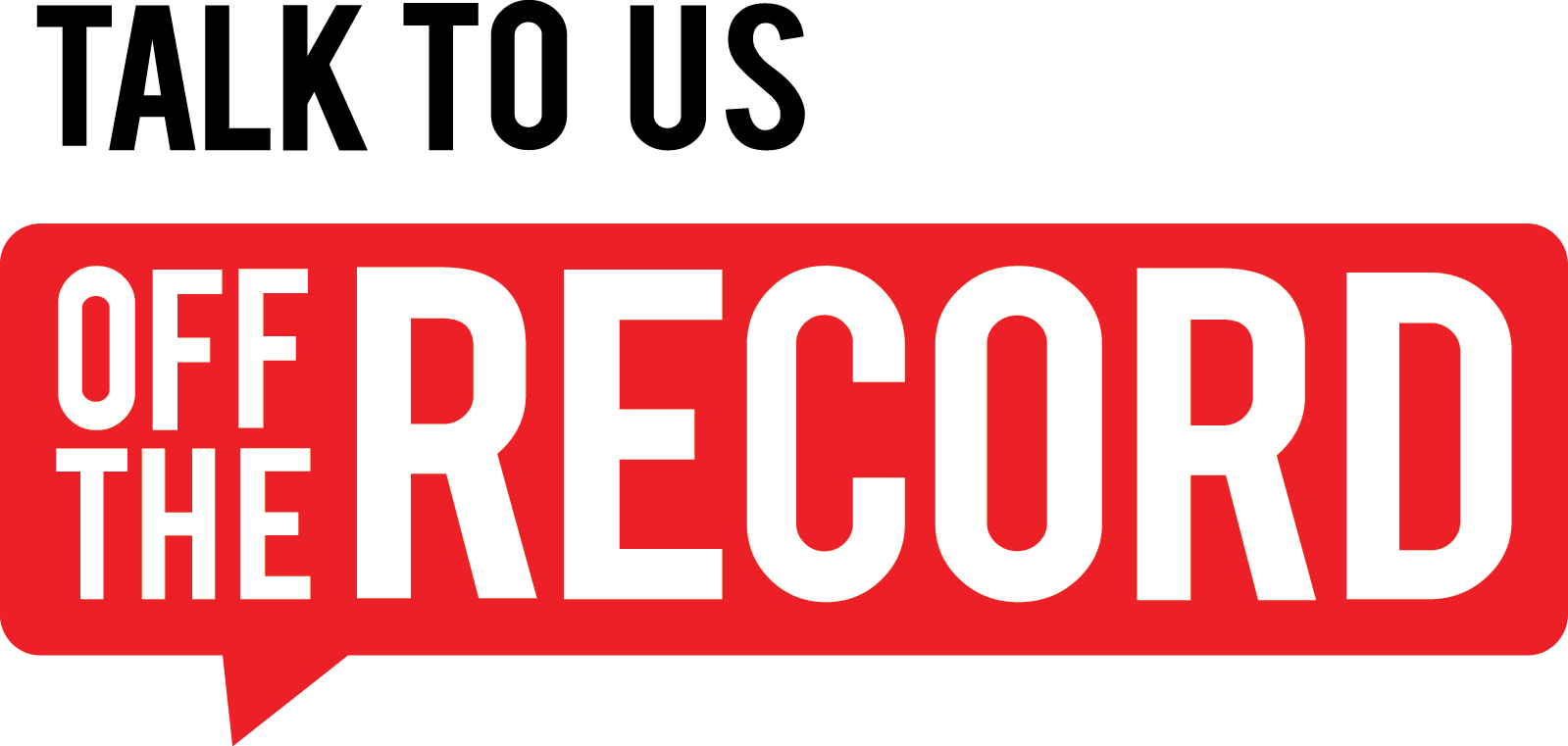
- The current logo
- Abbreviation: OTR
- Formation: 1994
- Founded at: Croydon
- Legal status: Registered charity
- Region served: Croydon, Merton and Sutton
- Services: Counselling
- Members: Youth Access, BACP
- Key people: Founder: Karen Stott
- Website: www.talkofftherecord.org

Off the Record (OTR) Youth Counselling is a mental health charity working across the London Boroughs of Croydon, Merton and Sutton which provides a range of free support services for young people. It celebrated its 25th anniversary in 2019.

Founded in Croydon in 1994 to provide free, independent and professional counselling for 14 – 25-year-olds, the charity expanded over the years to include further areas of work including mental health work in BME communities; a young carers service; a specialist counselling service for young refugees, online counselling, workshops and mental health support in schools.

Since 2019, Off The Record's counselling service in Merton operates in Vestry Hall.

== Memberships ==
Off the Record is a member of Youth Access, the national membership organisation for youth information, advice and counselling services (YIACS), and is a BACP-accredited service.

== Funding ==
Off The Record is supported by Croydon, Sutton & Merton local authorities and local Clinical Commissioning Groups as well as a range of charitable funders including Comic Relief and the Wimbledon Foundation. At the 2021 Wimbledon Championships, Off the Record were selected to perform the coin toss for the Men's Singles Finals.

In 2018, Travis Perkins marked the opening of a new branch in Beddington Lane, Croydon by donating £250 to Off the Record.

== Partnerships ==
In 2021, Off the Record launched a project with London Southbank University (LSBU) and the Croydon BME Forum to train London barbershops to test blood pressure in a UK-first project.

== Awards ==
In 2019, Off The Record was one of ten charities selected from more than 370 organisations across the UK to win a GSK IMPACT Award for outstanding contributions to improving the UK's health and wellbeing. The award is run in partnership with The King's Fund.
