= Mitcham Eastfields railway station =

National Rail station in London, England

Mitcham Eastfields
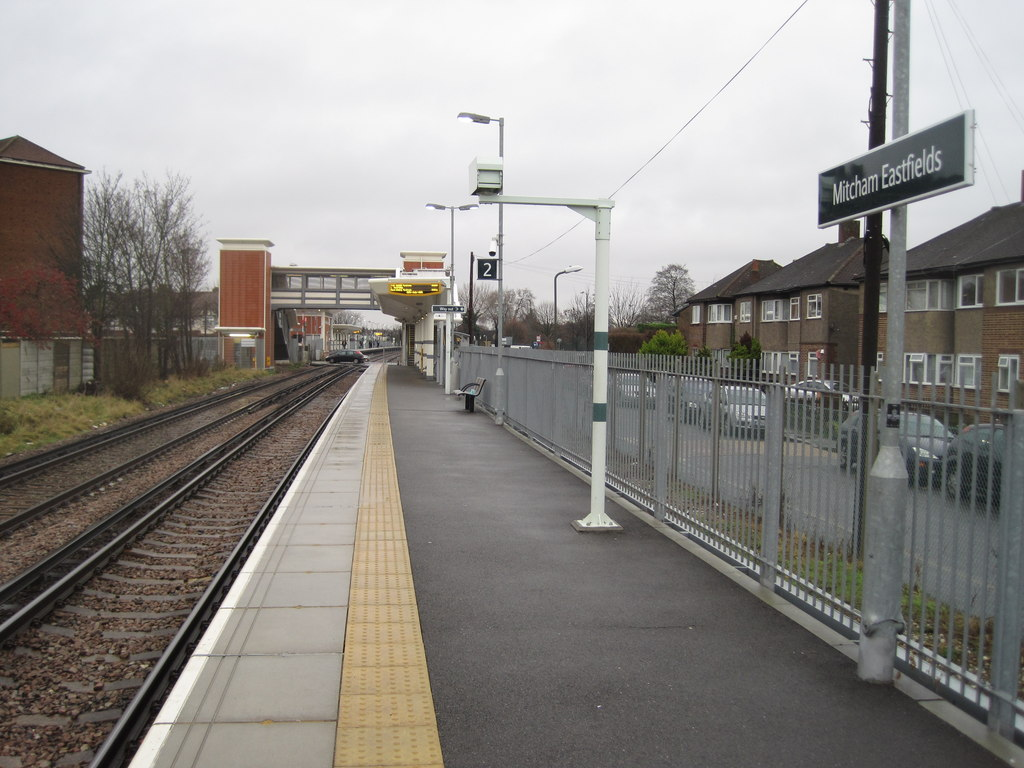
- Interactive map of Mitcham Eastfields

General information
- Location: Eastfields and Mitcham
- Local authority: London Borough of Merton
- Managed by: Southern
- Station code: MTC
- DfT category: E
- Number of platforms: 2
- Accessible: Yes
- Fare zone: 3

National Rail annual entry and exit
- 2021–22: ▲0.912 million
- 2022–23: ▲1.070 million
- 2023–24: ▲1.220 million
- 2024–25: ▲1.318 million
- 2025–26: ▲1.370 million

Railway companies
- Original company: Network Rail

Key dates
- 2 June 2008: Opened

Other information
- External links: Departures; Facilities
- Coordinates: 51.4077°N 0.1547°W

Mitcham Eastfields (initially known as Eastfields during planning and construction) is a railway station in London, United Kingdom, which opened on 2 June 2008. The infill station is located at Eastfields Road level crossing, in an area previously poorly served by public transport. The nearest station was Mitcham Junction, which along with Mitcham tram stop, was over 1 mile (1.6 km) from the district. It is in London fare zone 3.

== History ==
Proposals for the station have apparently existed since the 1930s. Planning permission was granted by the London Borough of Merton in August 2007. Construction started in October 2007. Following consultation, there were hopes to have the station open by December 2007.

The opening was originally scheduled for 19 May 2008 but that date was subsequently put back because Network Rail did not feel the station would be ready until early June. The opening was then planned for the morning of Monday 2 June 2008, but in the event it was delayed until the afternoon by safety inspections. It finally opened at 16:00 and the first train called at 16:11.

== Design ==
The station cost £6 million, and was the second station to be built to a modular design developed by Network Rail, which is also used at Corby railway station and Greenhithe railway station which was the first to be constructed. The platforms are 170 m (560 ft) long, with a building on the up (northbound) platform. Each platform is situated downstream of the level crossing, allowing the crossing to be reopened while trains are stopped at the station, minimising the disruption to road traffic. However this means that passengers must cross Eastfields Road (no controlled crossing at present, as of April 2026) if they wish to purchase a ticket on the northbound side and then travel southbound. The footbridge on the southbound side only allows safe movement over the railway and not the road.

== Services ==
Services at Mitcham Eastfields are operated by Southern and Thameslink using Class 377 and 700 EMUs.

The typical off-peak service in trains per hour is:

- 2 tph to London Victoria
- 2 tph to St Albans City via Herne Hill
- 2 tph to Sutton
- 2 tph to Dorking of which 1 continues to Horsham

During the peak hours, additional services between London Victoria and Epsom also call at the station, as well as a single return journey between Sutton and London Bridge.

On Saturday evenings (after approximately 18:45) and on Sundays, there is no service south of Dorking to Horsham.

Preceding station	National Rail	Following station
Balham	Southern Sutton & Mole Valley Lines	Mitcham Junction
Streatham	Thameslink Sutton & Mole Valley Lines	Mitcham Junction

== Connections ==
London Buses routes 152, 463 and school route 633 serve the station.
