= Burnett Bullock =

English cricketer

Burn Bullock
Personal information
- Full name: Burnett Wedlake Bullock
- Born: 5 October 1896; Redhill, Surrey, England
- Died: 22 December 1954 (aged 58); Balham, London, England
- Batting: Right-handed
- Role: Batsman

Domestic team information
- Years: Team
- 1920: Gentlemen of the South
- 1922–24: Surrey
- First-class debut: 3 July 1920 Gentlemen of the South v Players of the South
- Last First-class: 26 June 1924 Surrey v Cambridge University

Umpiring information
- FC umpired: 3 (1931–1932)

Career statistics
Competition	FC
Matches	6
Runs scored	121
Batting average	17.28
100s/50s	–/–
Top score	40
Catches/stumpings	–/–
- Source: CricketArchive, 20 March 2017

Burnett Wedlake "Burn" Bullock (5 October 1896 – 22 December 1954) was an English first-class cricketer who played for Surrey in a few matches between 1922 and 1924. He was born in Redhill, Surrey and died in Balham, London.

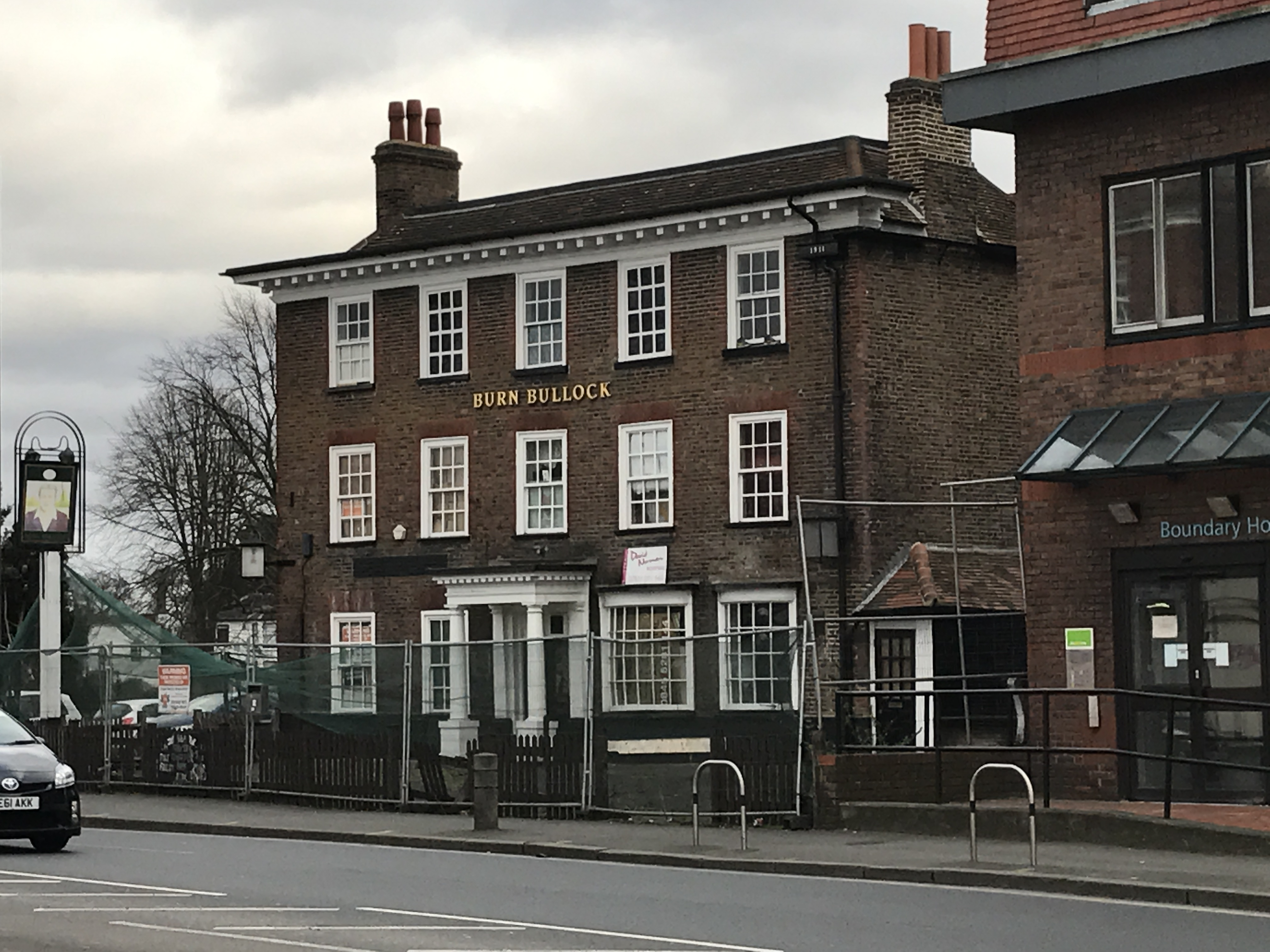
Burn Bullock inn, Mitcham

Bullock was the son of the surveyor for the town council of Mitcham, and was long associated with the Mitcham Cricket Club. He was described as a draughtsman when he joined the Royal Flying Corps in November 1915 and then the Royal Air Force in 1918 when it was formed. His trade was a Rigger Aero until he was discharged in 1919.

Bullock began playing cricket fairly regularly for Surrey's second eleven from 1920, and made his first-class cricket debut that year in a match for a "Gentlemen of the South" team in a game for the benefit of the "pavilion attendant" at The Oval; he neither batted nor bowled in a rain-ruined match. From 1922 to 1924, he played in five matches for the Surrey first team as an opening or middle-order batsman. He played as an amateur, and his highest first-class score was an innings of 40 in his first Surrey game, against Scotland in 1922. He did not play first-class cricket after 1924 and his last game for Surrey's second eleven was in 1925. In 1926 and 1927, he was employed as a cricket coach to the South Norfolk Cricket Club.

Returning to the London area, in 1939 Bullock was a licensed victualler at the Regent Arms in Westminster. He later became the licensee at the King's Head, an old coaching inn next to Mitcham Cricket Green and the cricket club pavilion, and after his death in 1954 the inn, which is a Grade II listed building, was renamed the "Burn Bullock" in his honour. The pub closed in 2013 and was destroyed by fire on 19 April 2024.
