= W. H. Greenleaf =

British political scientist (1927–2008)

William Howard Greenleaf (14 April 1927 – 10 March 2008) was a British political scientist.

== Early life ==
He was born in Thornton Heath, Surrey to a father who was a regimental sergeant major in the British Army. He was educated at Whitgift School in Croydon before performing his National Service in the Royal Navy. He then attended the London School of Economics, where he was taught by Harold Laski. He obtained a First in 1951, before being awarded a PhD in 1954. Greenleaf initially admired Laski's socialism but his political views moved towards conservatism under the influence of the LSE's Michael Oakeshott.

== Academic career ==
During 1953–54 Greenleaf was an assistant lecturer at the University of Manchester's economic research section before becoming an assistant lecturer in political studies at the University of Hull in 1954, where he was subsequently appointed reader. From 1967 until his retirement in 1982 he was professor of political theory and government at University College, Swansea.

His first book, Order, Empiricism and Politics, was devoted to sixteenth and seventeenth century political reasoning. His second work explored Oakeshott's political philosophy. The Michael Oakeshott Association said it was "for many years the best introduction to Oakeshott's thought that was available, and one that still repays consideration today".

His three volume work, The British Political Tradition, examined the influence of socialism, conservatism and liberalism on British politics. It was called "magisterial" by Rodney Barker and he was working on a fourth volume at the time of his death. In 1983 it won the Political Studies Association's prize for the best book on political science.

== Works ==
- Order, Empiricism and Politics (Oxford University Press, 1964).
- Oakeshott's Philosophical Politics (Longmans, 1966).
- The British Political Tradition, Volume One: The Rise of Collectivism (Routledge, 1983). ISBN 0416155707
- The British Political Tradition, Volume Two: The Ideological Heritage (Methuen, 1983). ISBN 041634660X
- The British Political Tradition, Volume Three: A Much Governed Nation, Part 1 (Routledge, 1987). ISBN 0416368204
