= Burn Bullock (public house) =

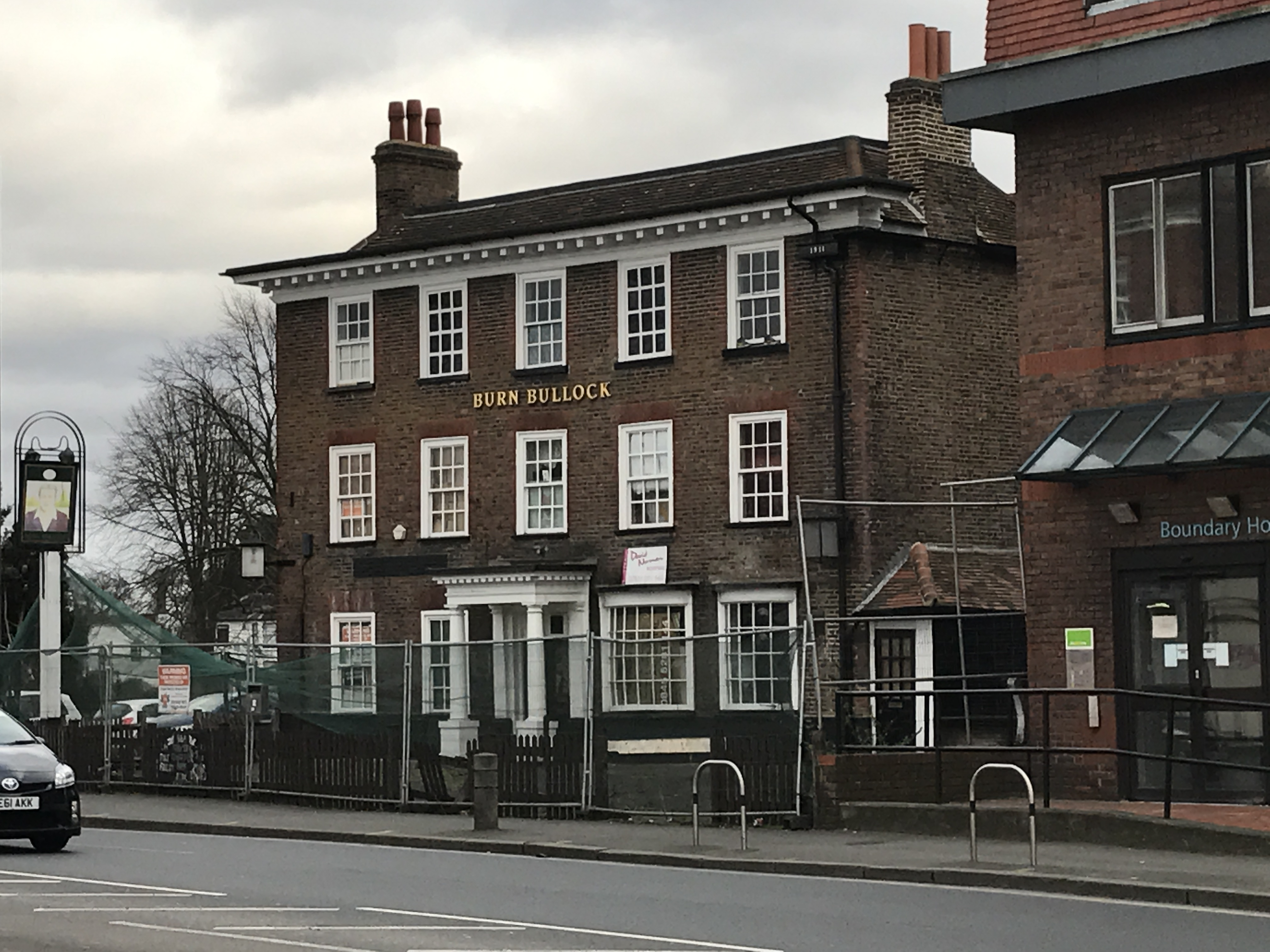
- Burn Bullock in 2017
- Interactive map of the Burn Bullock area
- Former names: The King's Head

General information
- Status: Derelict
- Type: Public house
- Location: 315, London Road, Mitcham, Merton, London, England
- Coordinates: 51.400636°N 0.168403°W
- Construction started: 16th century

Technical details
- Floor count: 3

Design and construction
- Designations: Grade II listed

The Burn Bullock is former public house in Mitcham, in the London Borough of Merton, England (at the time of its construction, the area was part of the county of Surrey). Parts of the building are thought to date to the 16th century. It was badly damaged by fire in April 2024.

== History ==
The King's Head Hotel was built as a coaching inn.

The Association of Cricket Umpires and Scorers was founded in the pub in 1953.

It was Grade II listed in 1954, giving it legal protection from unauthorised alteration or demolition.

In 1975 the pub was renamed for its former manager, the cricketer Burnett Bullock, who ran it from 1941 to 1954.

=== Closure and fire ===
The pub was closed in September 2009 because of ongoing anti-social behaviour. Around that time, it was sold for £450,000 to Phoenix GRP Investments Ltd., a newly-formed company.

In 2014, concerns were raised about the building's use by squatters. The same year, it was added to Historic England's "Heritage at Risk Register".

On 19 April 2024, the empty building was badly damaged by fire. The fire was attended by twelve fire appliances, including a 32-metre turntable ladder, and about 80 firefighters. The following month Merton Council stepped in to make the building safe, due to lack of response from Phoenix Investments.

Concerns were raised in December 2025 by Mitcham Cricket Green Community and Heritage, a local conservation group, that the building's condition was rapidly worsening, and that its collapse was possible.

== Architecture ==
The three-storey building's entry on the National Heritage List for England notes its features as including a five-bay front built in the early to mid 18th century, using yellow brick with red dressings, with a wing built in the 16th or 17th century, featuring panelling from the same era. The front has a central doric porch and sash windows with glazing bars. The second and fourth windows of the upper floor are blind.

== Nearby ==
Adjacent to the pub is Mitcham Cricket Club's pavilion, which is under the same ownership as the pub. Unusually, the pavilion and the club's ground are separated by a road.
