= Wandle =

Wandle can mean:

== Rivers ==
- River Wandle, also known as Wandle River, in South London, England
  - Wandle (Wandsworth ward)
  - Wandle Valley Wetland
  - Wandle Trail
  - Wandle Park, Croydon
    - Wandle Park tram stop
  - Wandle Park, Merton
    - Wandle (Merton ward)
    - Wandle Meadow Nature Park
- Wandle River in the South Island of New Zealand

== Ships ==
- SS Wandle (1909), a British coastal collier that fought an engagement with UB-27 in 1916
- SS Wandle (1932), a British coastal collier that survived being torpedoed in 1942
