= Waddon Ponds =

Park and inland water in Croydon, UK

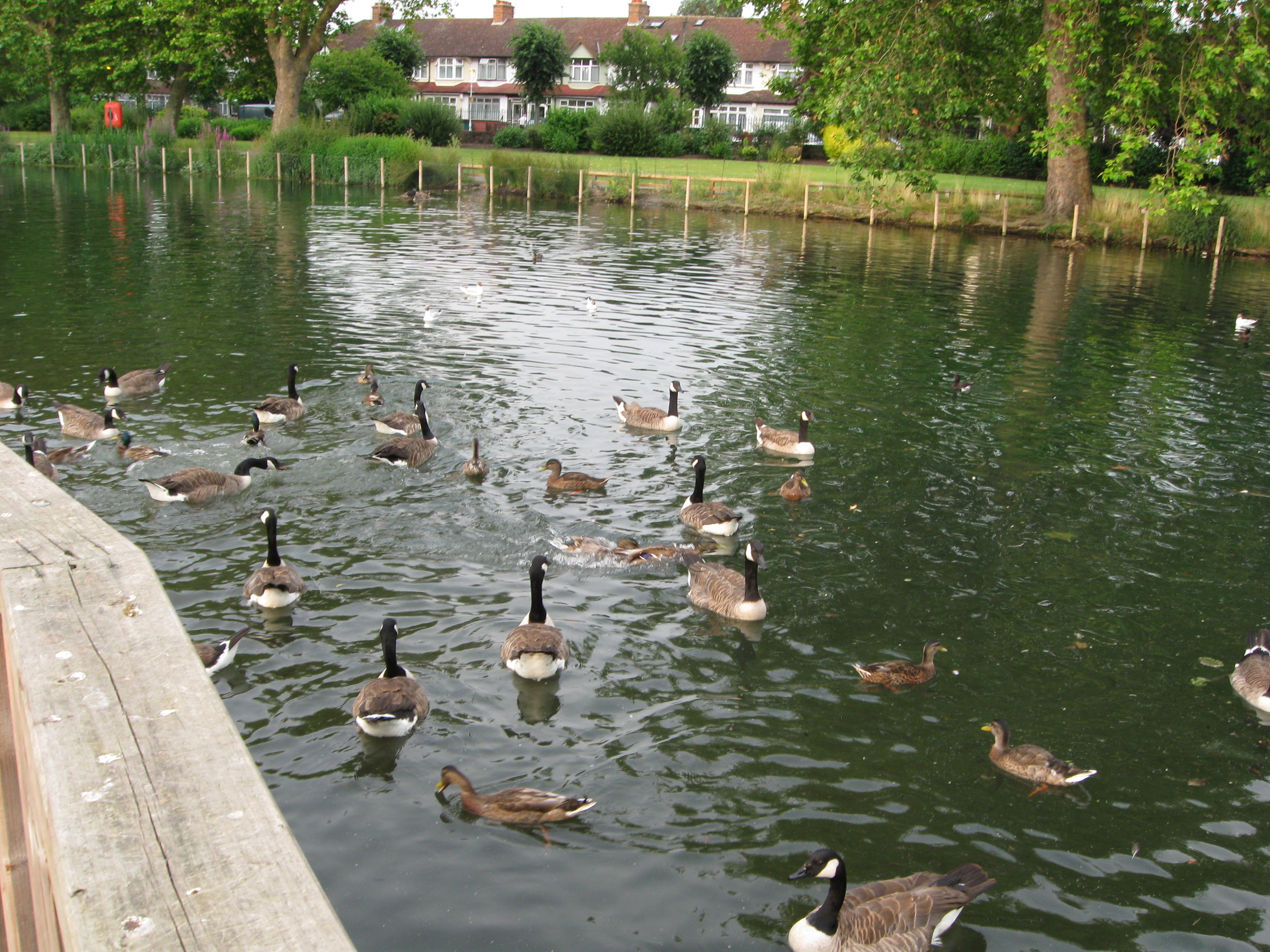
- Waddon Ponds; view from platform

- Location within Greater London
- Type: Inland water (urban park)
- Location: Mill Lane, Waddon, Croydon, UK
- OS grid: TQ 3094 6516
- Coordinates: 51.37049866°N 0.12025799°W
- Area: 8.5 acres (3.4 ha)
- Elevation: 40.6 m (133 ft)
- Operator: London Borough of Croydon
- Status: Open all year; (closed at night)
- Public transit: Multiple London Bus routes, serve the Purley Way (Waddon Post Office or Waddon Road stops); Tramlink to Waddon Marsh or Wandle Park tram stops

Waddon Ponds is an ornamental 8.5 acres (3.4 ha) urban park / inland water in the western part of the London Borough of Croydon, by whom it is managed. It is bordered to the north by Mill Lane, and on the other three sides by Waddon Court Road, Court Drive and The Ridgeway.

== History ==
Waddon Ponds is one of very few sites in Croydon where the River Wandle can be seen above ground. In nearby Wandle Park the Wandle can also be seen, released from its culvert in 2012. The ponds formed one of the sources of the river, which initially rises at South Croydon, and originally flowed north-west through the grounds of the Archbishops of Canterbury at Croydon Palace before reaching a millpond on the northern side of Mill Lane; opposite the current (2021) site of Waddon Ponds. The ponds themselves are fed by springs occurring at the junction of sand and chalk beds with London gravel beds.

The area of the ponds was formerly part of an estate of some 2,000 acres (810 ha) which included Waddon Court Farm and Waddon Lodge. The Domesday Book makes reference to a mill at the northern extent of the pond used for grinding corn and when adjacent housing was created in the early 20th-century, Iron Age and Bronze Age artefacts were found. The river had been dammed to form a lake at the northern end but was diverted at the end of the 19th-century and the drained land was used to grow watercress and subsequently given over to light industry. A mill was still in existence in 1928 when it closed down. At the same point, and following a campaign by a Mr. Pescot Row, a writer on themes of natural beauty, Croydon Corporation bought part of both Waddon Court Farm and Waddon Lodge, subsequent to the deaths of both owners. A sundial was donated to the ponds in acknowledgement of Row's efforts.

Between 2012 and 2017, Croydon Council undertook work to the park to change its type from an ornamental park to a more natural wetland. In particular the banks were graded to provide a gentle slope into the water rather than the boarded edges which existed previously.

The Wandle Trail, which loosely follows the course of the river from Croydon to Wandsworth, runs through the park.

== Facilities ==
In addition to the ponds themselves, the park contains a children's playground and toilets. At the south-eastern corner there is an ornamental garden.

From the main entrance, at the north-east corner, a path leads right round the ponds, with bridges at the points where the ponds split into two separate areas of water, finishing at the north-west corner, where the playground is sited and there is a further entrance. There are also entrances from Waddon Court Road.

== See also ==
- List of parks and open spaces in Croydon
- Croydon parks and open spaces

== Gallery ==
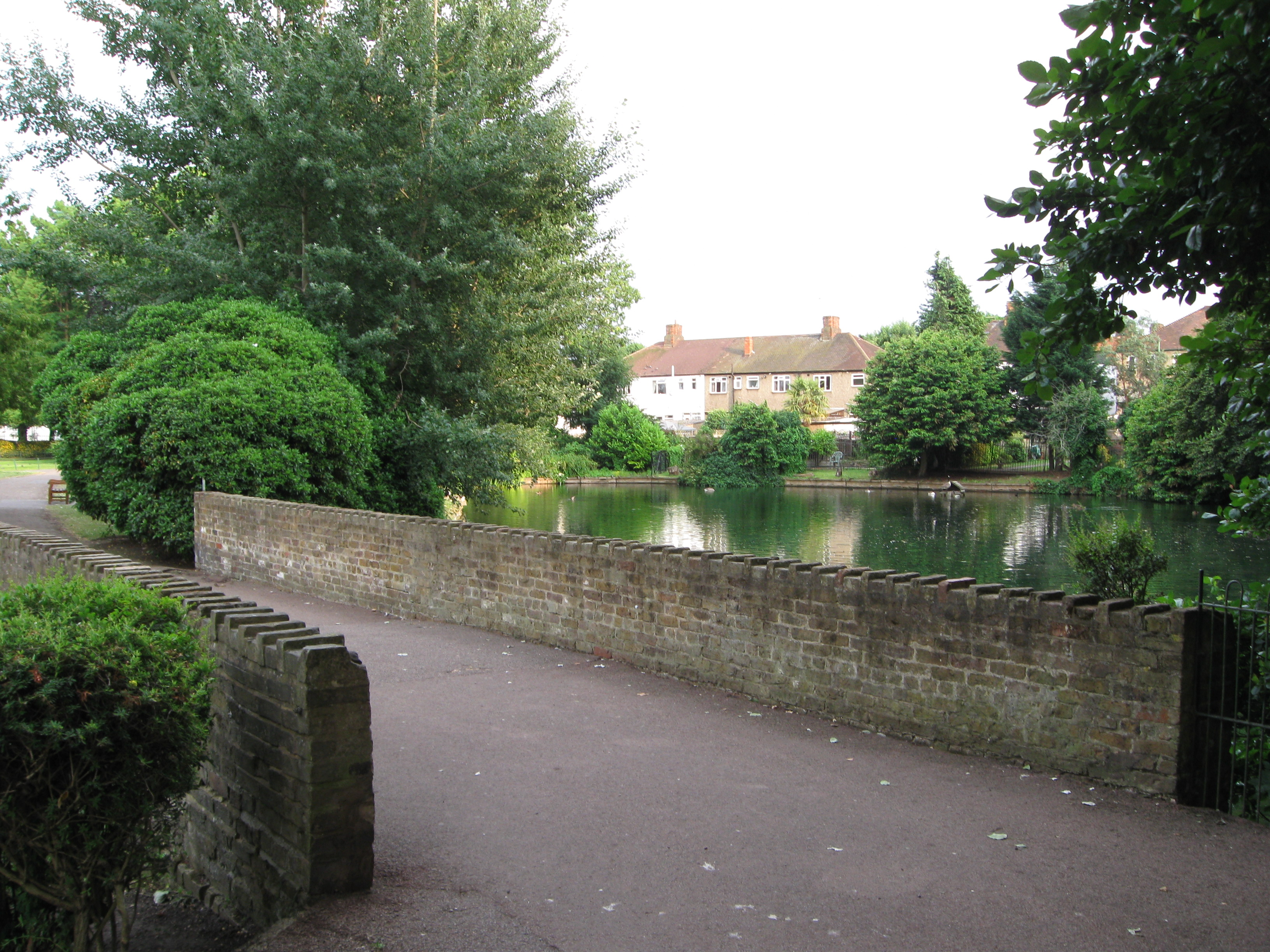
Bridge at the south west corner and smaller pond

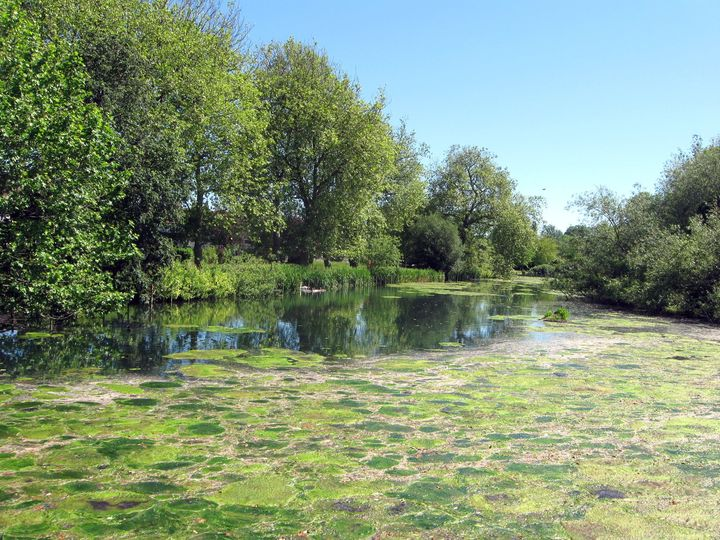
Waddon Ponds looking south-east from northern end

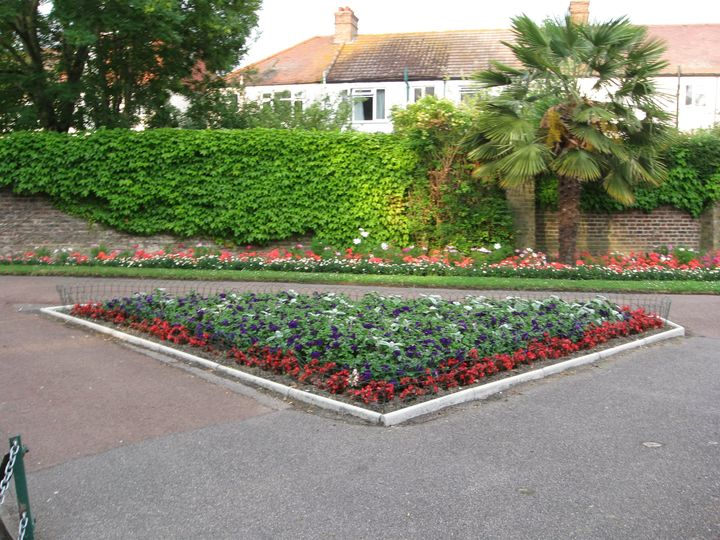
Part of the ornamental garden, Waddon Ponds
