= Bennetts Mill =

Bennetts Mill(s) may refer to:

- Bennetts Mills, New Jersey, United States
- Bennetts Mill, New Jersey, United States
- Bennetts Mill, Virginia, United States
- Bennett's Mill, a former textile manufacturing factory in London, England
