= Wandle Park =

Wandle Park may refer to one of two separate parks in London, England, both on the course of the River Wandle and on the Wandle Trail:

- Wandle Park, Croydon
- Wandle Park, Merton
