= Wandle Trail =

Trail in London

Coordinates: 51.3969°N 0.1803°W

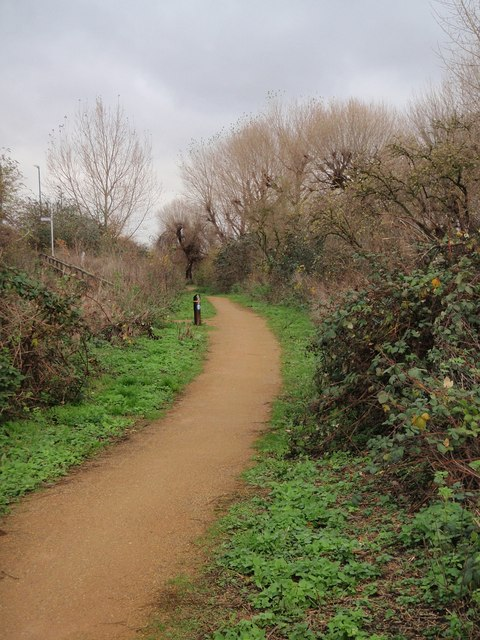
Wandle Trail as it approaches a turning leading to Weir Road, Wimbledon Park

The Wandle Trail is a 12.5-mile (20 km) walking and cycling trail that follows the River Wandle from Croydon to Wandsworth in south-west London.

== Background ==
The Wandle Trail was established by the Wandle Group in association with the Wandle Industrial Museum in September 1988, launched with a walk with over 200 participants, led by Colin Saunders. The Wandle Trail Map and Guide was put together in 1996 by the Wandle Industrial Museum with the support and help of London Borough of Merton, and sponsorship from Brown and Root. The original map was heritage and walk based (although the first, more limited version appeared some years earlier concentrating on disability access to the River Wandle), but then a revised map was produced by Groundwork Merton to facilitate bicycle access.

== Organisation ==
The Wandle Trail Group is now responsible for the promotion of the trail. The group consist of an association of the London Boroughs of Wandsworth, Merton and Sutton, together with Groundwork Merton (a charity to support the improvement of the quality of life for Londoners), Sustrans (a charity for sustainable transport, especially cycling), and Wandle News (a website containing news and information about the Wandle Trail.

== Description ==
The trail follows the river as far as possible by its banks. In some areas cycling is unsuitable, it divides into two trails: one for walkers, and the other which uses nearby roads for both cycle and walking. The Wandle runs through areas that are largely built-up. As public transport is available in the areas close by, access to the trail is easy at many points. Sections of the trail can be comfortably walked with stops for food and drink. Much of the trail uses existing Green Spaces (see below), each of which has its own attractions. There are some sections where the trail has to leave the river and use local roads. Schemes have been presented for future development that may overcome the obstacles by the river, but cost has so far prevented their implementation.

The trail has been designated National Cycle Network Route 20, and also will be part of route 22.

== Facilities ==
The trail starts at East Croydon Station and runs for about 12.5 miles (20 km) to the Thames near Wandsworth Town Station. The route passes near Earlsfield and Haydons Road railway stations, Colliers Wood and Morden underground stations and Phipps Bridge Tramlink stop. Many sections of the trail are suitable for wheelchair users and improvements have been proposed to extend these. In addition to the parks, the trail is adjacent to both Morden Hall (National Trust) and Merton Abbey Mills, which has a working waterwheel. There are several parts of the trail that are suitable for nature and ecological study, and some places where fishing is allowed.

A description and map of the trail are in a pamphlet published by the group. It shows the location of bus stops, phones, seats, and toilets. It also shows places on the route where refreshments can be obtained.

== Green spaces used by the trail ==
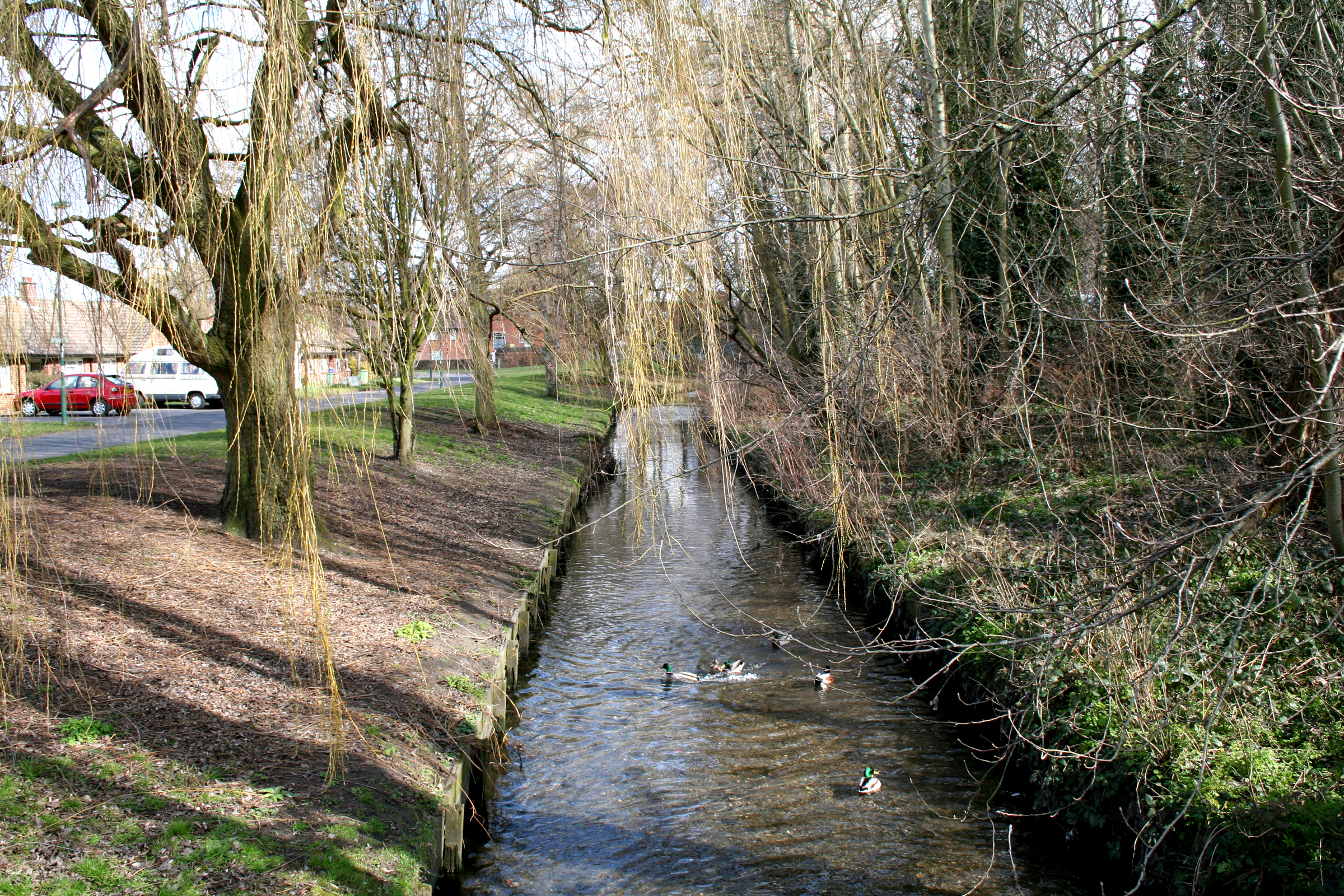
The River Wandle, looking east (upstream) from the footbridge where the Wandle Trail passes the end of Lavington Road in Beddington, Sutton

- Wandle Park, Croydon
- Beddington Park, Sutton
- Grove Park (Sutton), known as "The Grove"
- Wilderness Island, Sutton
- Dale Park
- Poulter Park
- Watermead
- Ravensbury Park, Mitcham
- Morden Hall Park
- Wandle Park, Colliers Wood
- Wandle Meadow Nature Park
- Garratt Park
- King George's Park
