= Ravensbury =

Ravensbury may refer to:

- Ravensbury (ward)
- Ravensbury Park

== See also ==
- Ravensburg
