= Waddon =

Area of London, England

Coordinates: 51°21′51″N 0°06′45″W

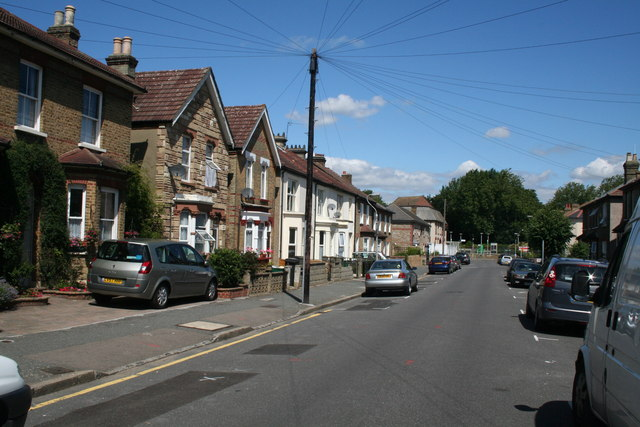
- Vicarage Road

- Location within Greater London
- Population: 1,679 (2011 Census. Ward)
- OS grid reference: TQ315645
- London borough: Croydon
- Ceremonial county: Greater London
- Region: London
- Country: England
- Sovereign state: United Kingdom
- Post town: CROYDON
- Postcode district: CR0
- Dialling code: 020
- Police: Metropolitan
- Fire: London
- Ambulance: London
- UK Parliament: Croydon West
- London Assembly: Croydon and Sutton

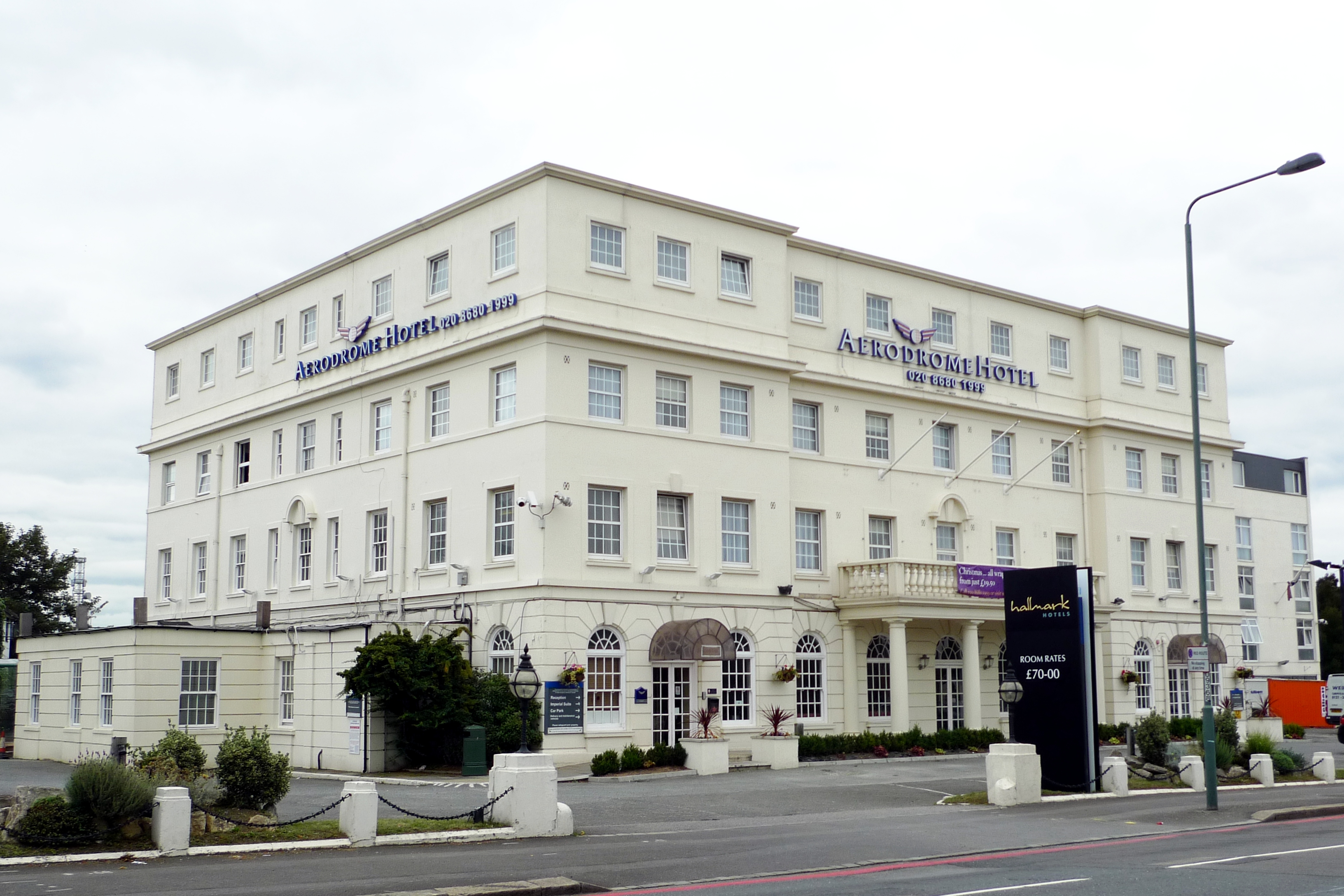
Aerodrome Hotel, Waddon in 2011

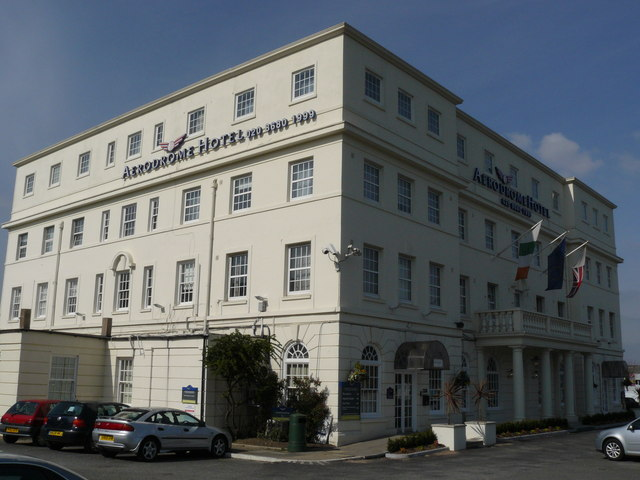
Aerodrome Hotel, Waddon in 2009

Waddon (/ˈwɒdən/ WOD-ən) is a neighbourhood in the London Borough of Croydon, at the western end of the town of Croydon. The area borders the London Borough of Sutton.

== History ==
It is not known when the manor of Croydon was granted to the See of Canterbury, but it is thought of be before the end of the 9th century. The archbishop had lands in Croydon about 871. The Domesday Book of 1086 shows it as part of the archbishop's lands held in demesne (for his own use). After a royal grant in the 13th century, Croydon became a market town. In 1276 Archbishop Robert Kilwardby obtained a grant of market in 1276. It was to be held every Friday and a nine-day fair was to be held on the vigil of St. Botolph the abbot (17 June). Waddon's name was first recorded in the twelfth century and derives from Old English meaning 'the hill where woad grows, or is grown'. Evidence of Bronze Age and Iron Age habitation have been found locally. Waddon has an older area with 19th-century properties, some even older, close to central Croydon. Further south is a large estate of Council-owned and former Council-owned homes and a small number of tower blocks. In the inter-war years Waddon had the most Croydon Corporation owned homes in Croydon with 1,125 council houses and 80 council flats.

The geographical area of Waddon extends further north than the political boundary of Waddon ward. Located in the Wandle river valley, one of the river's sources, Waddon Ponds, is a public open space. The Wandle has been deculverted in Wandle Park and in the New South Quarter development. Wandle Park, opened in 1890, has benefited from the Town and Country Planning Act 1990's Section 106 monies paid by property developers of the New South Quarter which have been used to refurbish the park. The River Bourne once flowed above ground through the South Mead, now Southbridge Road, and along Old Town where it joined the River Wandle. From the Middle Ages the Waddon Court Estate covered much of the area. Mills operated on the River Wandle which was used later to irrigate watercress beds as well as feed the lakes of Waddon Court.

The first incarnation of the Hare and Hounds public house opened in 1773, on what was then Waddon Marsh Lane. In the latter years of the 18th century Waddon Court's owner, John Dewye Parker, raised a volunteer corps of yeomen here, at his own expense, and "military evolutions were performed with the utmost precision, upon the lawn surrounding his mansion."

The Old Tithe Barn tithe barn was part of Waddon Court with the building opposite the Waddon Leisure Centre dating back to 1799. The building was later used as a barn within Coldharbour Farm. It was listed in 1990 and until 2007 was used by the now closed Grants Solicitors, the practice of the former Justice minister and MP for Maidstone & The Weald, Helen Grant. In August 2017 the local authority gave planning permission for the barn to be used for religious worship with the successful applicant being the O Farinloye Kingdom Heritage Christian Fellowship.

Waddon has a long history of industrial trades. The Croydon gasworks were built on Waddon Marsh in 1867. An electricity generating station opened in 1896. The opening of the Purley Way in 1925 prompted the building of a number of factories including for Redwing Aircraft Ltd., Trojan Ltd. (car manufacturers), Tizer Ltd, Standard Steel Co., Croydon Foundry Ltd. (1920), Metal Propellers Ltd., (1925) and Southern Foundries Ltd. (1926). Croydon Corporation built the Waddon pumping station in 1910–11 on the road now called Waddon Way.

A second power station – Croydon B – opened in 1950 eliminating the first of the watercress beds. First commissioned in 1947 and built by Croydon Corporation the power station was nationalised by the then Labour government.

Duppas Hill Terrace hosts the Elis David Almshouses, built in 1974 and officially opened on 25 March 1975 by Princess Alexandra. These almshouses replaced the original almshouses in Church Street and the Henry Smith 1896 almshouse in Scarbrook Road. The Elis David charity was founded in perpetuity by Elias Davy on 27 April 1447. The current site of the almshouses was previously that of Croydon's workhouse.

Duppas Hill was Croydon's first recreation ground. Croydon Board of Health bought land from the Ecclesiastical Commissioners for £2,000 in 1865. The Whitgift Foundation state that the clay and bricks for the Whitgift almshouses came from Duppas Hill after Park Hill, Croydon bricks proved to be inferior. The timber for the Whitfgift almshouses came from Waddon ward's Haling Manor.

In 1931, Whitgift School moved to its current site in Haling Park, which was once home to Lord Howard of Effingham, the Lord High Admiral of the Fleet sent against the Spanish Armada.

St George's Church was built in the heart of the Waddon housing estate, being erected in 1932. The architects were W. Curtis Green, R.A. and Partners. With a capacity for 339 parishioners the structure cost £5,580 and the fittings, fees and other outgoings cost £1,307. Dressed in Portland stone and with a timber roof covered with tiles.

The former Croydon Airport is in south-west Waddon. The aerodrome was established in December 1915 for the defence of London. Land to the east of Plough Lane was requisitioned for testing by the National Aircraft Factory No.1 and was known as Waddon Aerodrome. In 1920 the Beddington and Waddon aerodromes became the main customs airport for London.

The international distress term "Mayday" was invented at Waddon's Croydon Airport. It was Croydon Airport senior radio officer Frederick Stanley Mockford (1897 – 1 March 1962) who was the originator of the uniform international distress signal.

The local community consequently suffered badly in traffic from a different European location in the Blitz bombing raids in World War II. An attack on 15 August 1940 marked the first civilian bombing with 62 civilian fatalities and 185 injured outside the airport. In addition two civilian telephone operators were injured.

Land and existing buildings in this area may be found to be subject to 20th century restrictive covenants preventing new construction above a certain height due to the proximity of the former airport, but those restrictions ought to be redundant by now, given that the airport has long since gone. The last commercial flight from the airport was in 1959. The imposing hotel which used to serve the airport remains to this day.

The South London Pirates are one of the most successful teams in the British Baseball Federation, playing at Roundshaw, on part of the old airport.

Running through Waddon, from Purley to the western reaches of Thornton Heath, is the Purley Way, the A23, home to many superstores and light industrial units. A bypass road was first mooted in 1908 with the corporation's Roads Committee putting forward a full Thornton Heath to Purley relief road proposal in June 1911. Work commenced after the Great War in 1919 with the official opening in 1925. In 1932 the southern section of Purley Way was the first highway to benefit from sodium street lighting. The whole stretch benefitted from such lighting by 1936 with lights often strung over the centre of the highway.

The Purley Way saw an Art Deco building in the late 1930s at 606, Purley Way for cardboard packager Acme Corrugated Paper & Box. Co. Ltd.

Waddon's Purley Way also hosts the Waddon Leisure Centre at Fiveways junction with facilities that include a 65 station gym, a 25-metre swimming pool, a learner pool, a sports hall, a cafe and 30 parking spaces.

Waddon has had two other swimming facilities on the Purley Way in the past. The open-air Purley Way Swimming Pool opened on 27 July 1935 and except for the war period was open until 1975. The diving platforms are retained within the site. In part replacement for these closed pools and those at Scarbrook Road in Old Town a "Water Palace" facility was built on Metropolitan Open Land opposite the old airport for the Conservative council and opened in 1990. Including wave machines the facility was closed by the first Labour-led council in 1996, citing dangerous and uneconomic conditions (a £500,000 a year loss) and dismissing Conservative accusations of an anti-south of the borough outlook. The district auditor criticised the closure decision as "poor value for money." The Highways Agency opposition slowed the sale of the site to the private sector.

The Water Palace site was replaced by the Colonnades shopping, food, sports club and bus terminal centre.

Waddon railway station is on the line between West Croydon railway station and Epsom Downs and Sutton. Waddon railway station opened on the Epsom branch of the London, Brighton and South Coast Railway in 1863. and was originally placed to the east of its current location. There are Tramlink stops at Waddon Marsh and Wandle Park (the former replacing a railway station of the same name). Opened in 2000 the tram greatly improved ease of access to Croydon compared to the poorly patronised Southern Railway line to Wimbledon.

The Waddon Hotel was built next to the original Waddon rail station with both buildings at that time situated in a rural environment. In 1928 opposite the hotel the Stafford Parade was completed and boasted a dairy, a grocery, a chemist's, a butcher's, a café and two banks.

Richardson's Joinery used to be by the pillars at the entry into The Waldrons. Victoria Place off Southbridge Place was replaced by Victoria House where Croydon's Educational Psychological Service and a Pupil Referral Unit was based. The site that became unused now has an Avanti primary school based on a Hindu faith ethos.

== Politics ==
Politically, Waddon ward is a marginal ward on Croydon Council and has seen its representation swap between the Labour, Conservative and Ratepayers Parties since the late 1920s. With elections every year Labour took Waddon in 1929 and in 1937 and 1938 with RA candidates winning in the intervening years and also continuously from 1919 to 1928.

The first elections to the new London Borough of Croydon council in 1964 saw all three seats go to Labour. The Conservatives secured all three Waddon seats in the 1968 landslide for the Conservatives in London. 1971 saw Labour take all three seats back. 1974 saw Labour hold two of the three seats but there were Waddon by-election wins for the Conservatives both in 1976 and 1977 electing Councillors Jim Nea and Michael Wunn respectively.

In 1986, the ward representation was shared between the Conservatives with two councillors and Labour one councillor after the Conservatives had held all the seats both in 1978 and in the 1982 Conservative landslide when the only five seats held by Labour were in New Addington.

In 1990 and 1994, Labour won all three seats with the Conservatives falling to third place in an August 1993 by-election. In 1998, the ward returned one Labour and two Conservative councillors, one of whom defected to the Liberal Democrats.

In 2002, Labour recovered all three seats, albeit with one of the Labour candidates crossing the winning line with a majority of just eight votes. In the 2006 elections, Waddon returned three Conservative councillors. In 2010 the three Waddon council seats were retained by the Conservatives with Labour scoring its lowest vote share – 31.8% – during the existence of the post 1964 London Borough to Croydon. In 2014 the ward returned three Labour councillors, Robert Canning, Andrew Pelling and Joy Prince on a swing from the Conservatives to Labour of 7.1%. 2018 saw Labour retaining the three seats with an increased majority on the altered boundaries as detailed below.

In 2022 Labour held two of the three seats as it shed 2,035 votes. The other seat was taken by the Conservatives.

== Nearest places ==
- Wallington, London
- Beddington
- Carshalton
- Croydon
- Purley

== Nearest stations ==
- Waddon railway station
- South Croydon railway station
- West Croydon station
- Waddon Marsh tram stop
- Wandle Park tram stop
