= Ravensbury (ward) =

- Electoral ward for the Merton London Borough Council
- Borough: Merton
- County: Greater London
- Population: 9,480 (2021)
- Major settlements: Ravensbury Park
- Area: 1.512 km²

Current electoral ward
- Created: 1965
- Councillors: 3 (since 1978); 4 (until 1978)

Ravensbury is an electoral ward in the London Borough of Merton. The ward was first used in the 1964 elections and elects three councillors to Merton London Borough Council.

== Geography ==
The ward is named after the Ravensbury Park area.

== Councillors ==
Election	Councillors		
2022	Stephen Alambritis MBE (Labour)	Caroline Charles (Labour) (Independent since 2024)	Peter McCabe (Labour)

== Elections ==
=== 2022 ===
Ravensbury (3)
Party	Candidate	Votes	%	±%
Labour	Caroline Charles	1,504	68.4	N/A
Labour	Stephen Alambritis*	1,497	68.1	N/A
Labour	Peter McCabe*	1,346	61.2	N/A
Conservative	Sarah Holmes	385	17.5	N/A
Conservative	Rory Holdt	355	16.1	N/A
Conservative	Thomas Moulton	337	15.3	N/A
Green	Karen Ohara	294	13.4	N/A
Liberal Democrats	Sarah Weber	192	8.7	N/A
Liberal Democrats	Stephen Harbron	173	7.9	N/A
Liberal Democrats	Hamish Norbrook	153	7.0	N/A
Turnout		2,199	32.8	
Labour hold				
Labour hold				
Labour hold				

== See also ==
- List of electoral wards in Greater London
