= Bennett's Ditch =

River in London, England

Coordinates: 51.413°N 0.182°W

Bennett's Ditch—sometimes spelled Bennetts Ditch—is a minor river (brook) located in the locality of Colliers Wood in the London Borough of Merton, Greater London, England. It is a tributary of Pickle Ditch, itself a tributary of the River Wandle. Bennett's Ditch ostensibly receives its name from Calico Print Works, which was located in the area and owned by a Mr. Bennett. Bennett's Mill, a textile manufacturing factory, used to be located by the stream.
