= Pickle Ditch =

River in London, England

Coordinates: 51°24′59″N 0°10′50″W

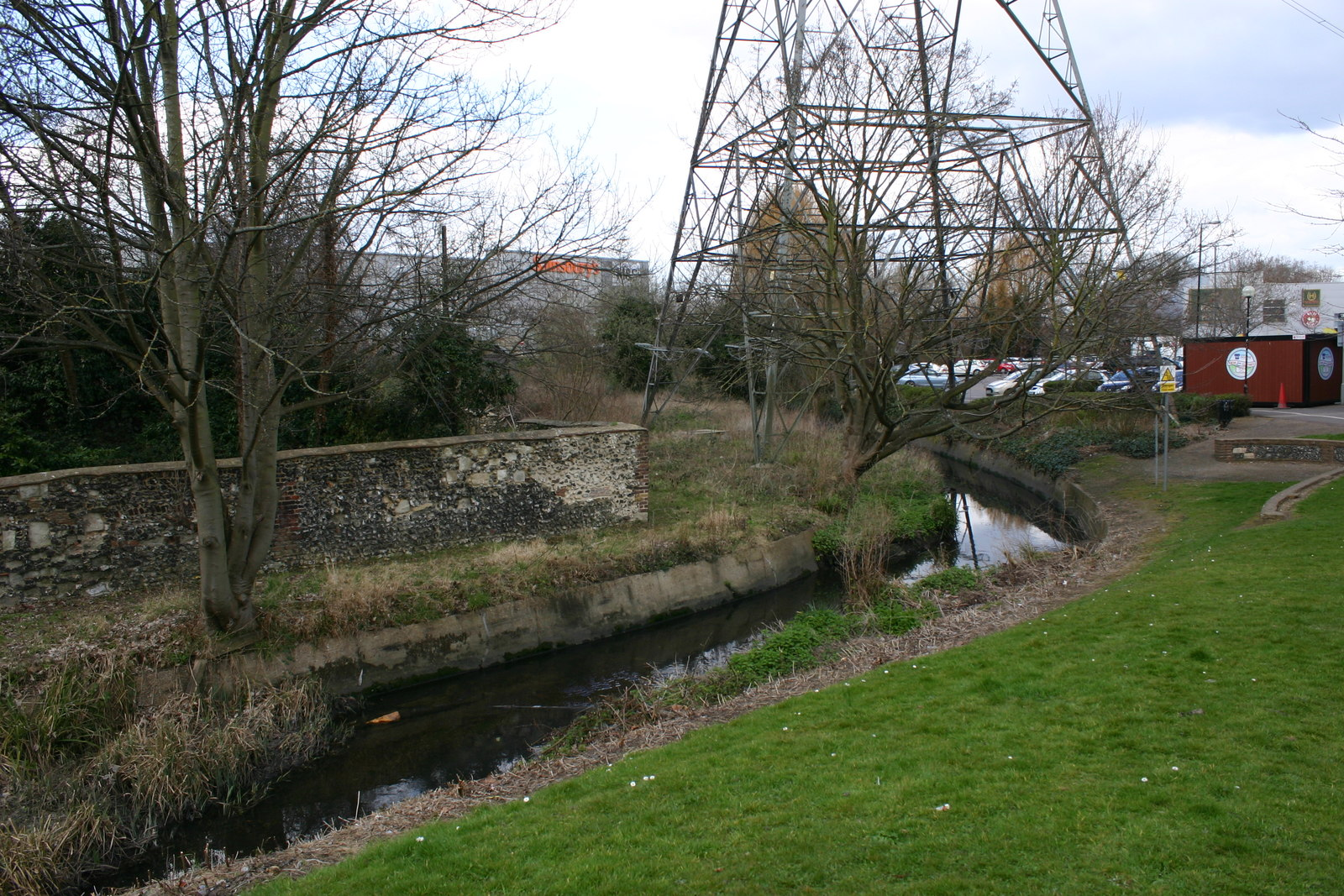
Pickle Ditch, looking north with Merton Priory Wall (left) visible

Pickle Ditch, also known as the Pickle, is a minor, 0.9-kilometre (0.56 mi) long stream—brook—in the locality of Colliers Wood in the London Borough of Merton, Greater London, England. Rising from the River Wandle, a tributary of the River Thames, and flowing back into it, Pickle Ditch is the last remaining course of the River Wandle's original course through Merton, before the other sections were straightened.

== Course ==
Located entirely in Colliers Wood, Pickle Ditch's course closely aligns with Merton Priory Wall, built in the 12th century. It flows a northerly course west of Priory Retail Park, and splits from the River Wandle near Phipps Bridge. After 70 metres (230 ft), the stream flows through a culvert for 356 metres (1,168 ft)—flowing underneath the A24 road—after which it then receives the waters of Bennett's Ditch. After a final 487 metres (1,598 ft), Pickle Ditch flows back into the River Wandle underneath Merton Bridge at Merton High Street.

== Human history ==
Like Bennett's Ditch, Pickle Ditch used to be the site of several factories, especially steel mills. It was considered heavily polluted. By 1861, a copper works' water wheel was powered by the ditch. Improvements to Pickle Ditch were made in 1930 for a cost of £6,000.
