= Norbury Brook =

Coordinates: 51.4252°N 0.1849°W

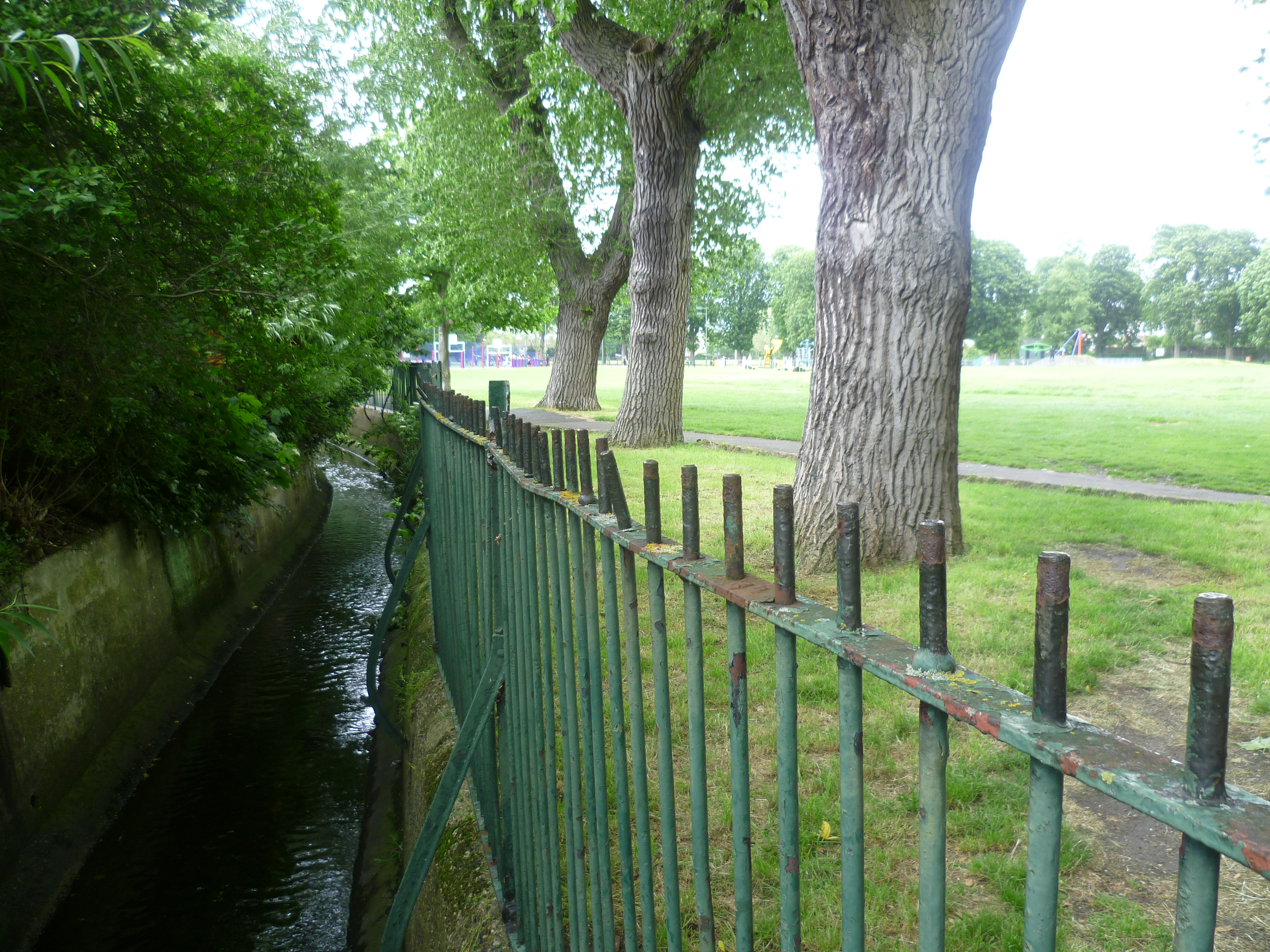
The Norbury Brook at Thornton Heath Recreation Ground, London

Norbury Brook is a tributary of the River Wandle that rises near Lower Addiscombe Road and flows north-west through Selhurst, Thornton Heath, and Norbury before joining the Wandle at south Wimbledon.

A short stretch of this is visible in Selhurst at Heavers' Meadow, near Selhurst railway station, where the brook can be seen in a concrete channel next to the British Rail works as it runs north west along the bottom of the site before disappearing beneath Selhurst Road. It is fenced off here because it can be dangerous, especially after a rain storm, where the water level can rise several feet in a few minutes, as the water rapidly drains from the roads and hard surfaces around and into the surface water drain.

The brook reappears in Thornton Heath Recreation Ground, running along the western boundary of the park in a deep concrete channel. Most of the time the brook is fairly shallow, but during heavy rainfall water quickly drains from the adjacent built up areas and the water level rapidly rises. It then continues behind several private houses in between before reaching Norbury Park where, once again, it is hidden behind a tall fence.

The brook continues west, to form the boundary between Norbury and Streatham on London Road at Hermitage Bridge, where it is one of the few rivers remaining overground in the area. As the boundary between the London County Council and Croydon for many years people wishing to travel south had to get off an LCC tram, walk across the bridge and catch a Croydon tram. West of the bridge the brook becomes the River Graveney, where it flows on to join the Wandle, and ultimately the River Thames.

There is a small tributary of the Graveney called the Little Graveney Stream, which runs through Figges Marsh and was culverted in the early 20th century and is no longer visible. It joins the Graveney near Tooting Junction Station.

Two other tributaries of the Graveney are commemorated by local street names, Donnybrook and Fallsbrook Roads. During 1976 drought, water flooded out of sewer on Aberfoyle Road. A house on Edgington Road near the railway experienced flooding in 1976, 1993 and 2000. Besley and Leverson Streets descend to the valley of the Graveney and Fallsbrook Road, possibly following course of stream. Up to the 1970s, a house on Streatham Vale near junction with Farmhouse Road had, in the front garden, a badly eroded Roman pillar (milestone?) with lettering ____ER, FLU___ carved on it. Streatham was known as Streatham Wells in many old maps.
