= Huguenot Burial Site =

Historic burial site in London

Coordinates: 51.458148°N 0.18343°W

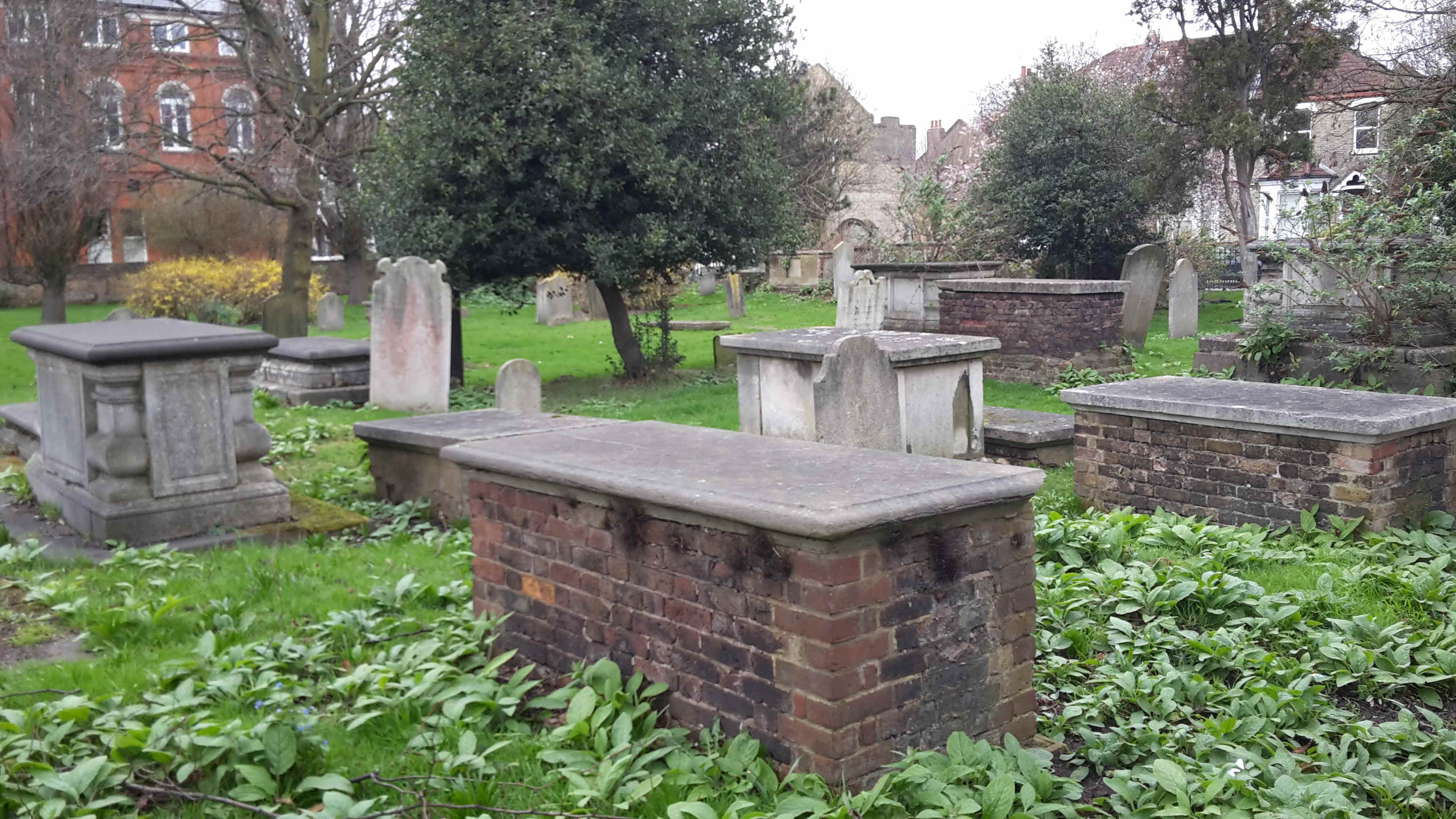
View of Huguenot Burial ground, Wandsworth, London, known as Mount Nod

The Huguenot Burial Site (also known as Mount Nod Cemetery) is a former burial ground for Huguenots in Wandsworth, London. It was in use from 1687 to 1854. The burial site is located between East Hill and Huguenot Place in the London Borough of Wandsworth. It is located next to St Mary Magdalen Roman Catholic Church.

== History ==
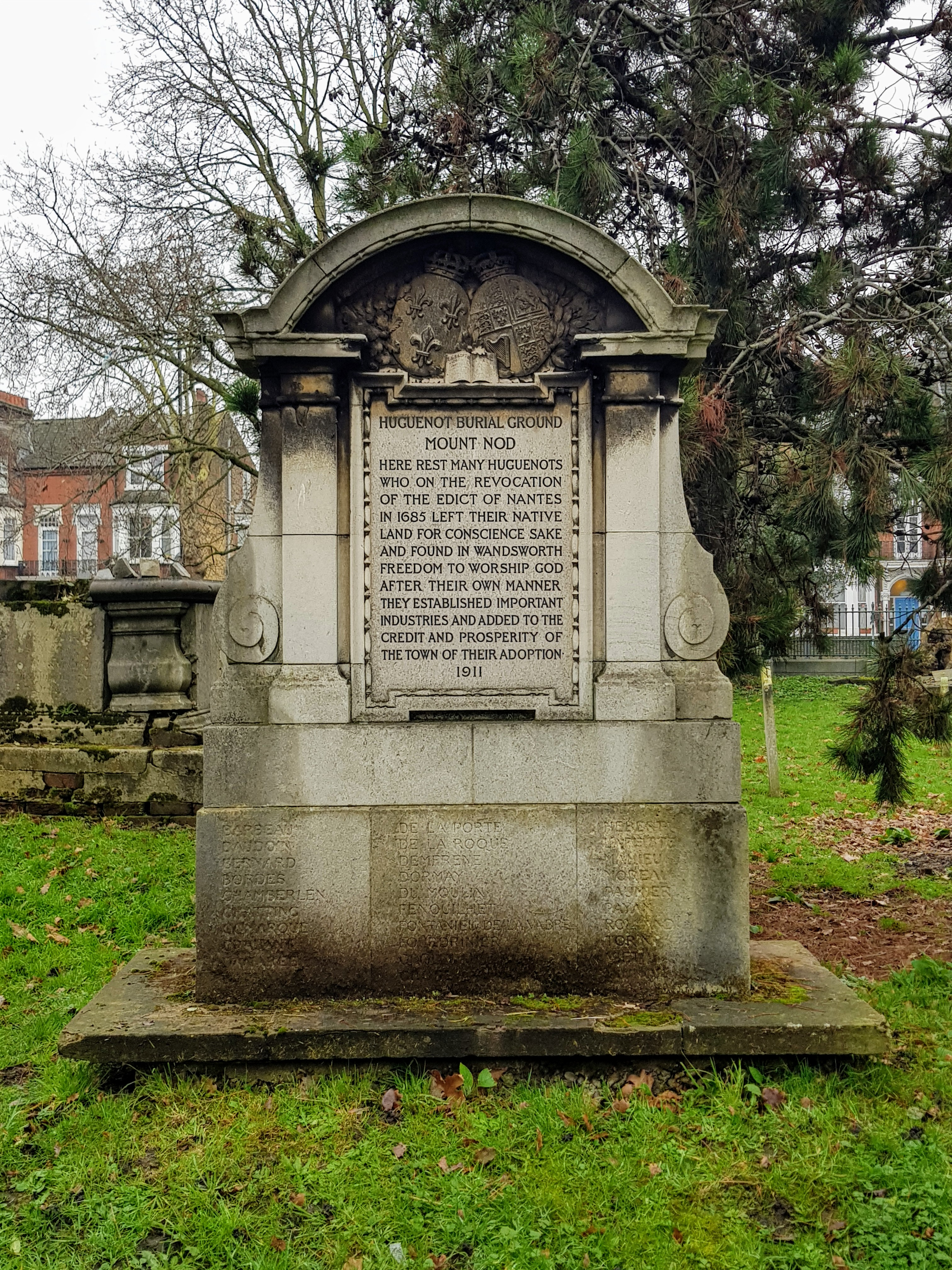
Memorial at Huguenot Burial Ground, Wandsworth, London, known as Mount Nod

The walled burial ground, which covers just under half an acre, lies at the top of East Hill and was opened in 1687 as a burial ground for Huguenot refugees – people who fled religious persecution in France after embracing the Protestant faith. Many of these refugees from across the English Channel settled in Wandsworth, attracted by the cloth and textile mills which lined the banks of the River Wandle – bringing their skills as hat and dressmakers, helping to establish 17th and 18th century Wandsworth as a famed centre of fashion and clothes making.

Church services in French were performed at the old Presbyterian Chapel in Wandsworth for over a century after the first Huguenots arrived. Victorian social commentator James Thorne, writing in 1876, stated that “gradually the French element became absorbed in the surrounding population, but Wandsworth was long famous for hat making.”

The burial ground closed in 1854 and today is mainly grass with trees and shrubs around the perimeter. It has been given local historic park and garden status as part of the council's recently held consultation on local listing.

There are a few monuments left. On the north side of the cemetery is a pedimented memorial with an explanation of the burial site, although it has become practically illegible. In 1911 a memorial was erected to the memory of the Wandsworth Huguenots. The text on this memorial reads:

Here rest many Huguenots who on the Revocation of the Edict of Nantes in 1685 left their native land for conscience' sake and found in Wandsworth freedom to worship God after their own manner. They established important industries and added to the credit and prosperity of the town of their adoption.

On the plinth are inscribed the following names of Huguenots buried either in Mount Nod itself or in the older graveyard surrounding the parish church.

BARBEAU, BOUDOIN, BERNARD, BORDES, CHAMBERLEN, CHATTING, COMARQUE, CRAUANT, DAMAREE, DARVALL, DE LA PORTE, DE LA ROQUE, DEMFRENE, DORMAY, DU MOULIN, FENOUILHET, FONTANIEU DE LA VABRE, FOURDRINTER, GROLLEAU, GROSE, HEBERT, HOLLAND, LAFITTE, MAHIEU, MOREAU, PAUMIER, PAYAN, TORIN, VIET, VIGNON

The council was awarded title deeds in 2019 and is now able to carry out work to improve and conserve this historic green space. The refurbishment project will take around six months to complete.
