= Waddon Marsh railway station =

Former railway station in England

Waddon Marsh
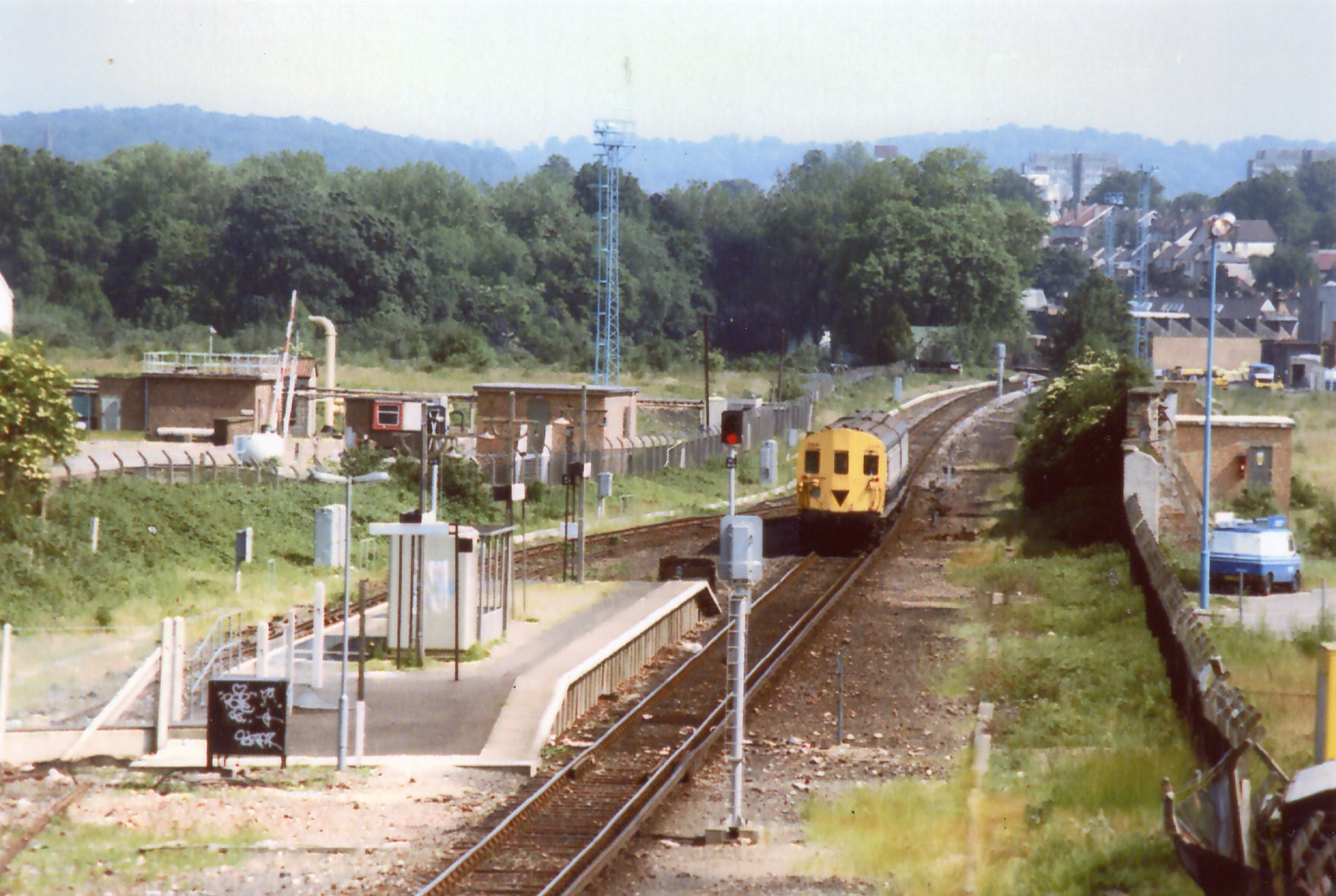
- Interactive map of Waddon Marsh

General information
- Location: London Borough of Croydon
- Owner: Southern Railway
- Number of platforms: 1, (2 when first opened)

Key dates
- 6 July 1930: Opened
- 2 June 1997: Closed
- Replaced by: Waddon Marsh tram stop

Other information
- Coordinates: 51.3786°N 0.1197°W

Waddon Marsh railway station was in Waddon in the London Borough of Croydon on the West Croydon to Wimbledon Line. It was between West Croydon and Beddington Lane Halt stations. There was pedestrian access by footpath only from Miller Road a side street near Purley Way.

== History ==
It was opened by the Southern Railway on 6 July 1930 to serve new housing in Waddon, and Croydon Gas Works, and Croydon A & B Power Stations. An island platform accessed by a footbridge served two through tracks. Two other tracks at the station were sidings for the gas works and power stations. Services were westbound to Wimbledon through Mitcham Junction, and eastbound to West Croydon.

Originally named Waddon Marsh Halt, the station was renamed Waddon Marsh on 5 May 1969.

The closure of Croydon A power station had little effect on the passenger numbers but when Croydon B power station shut in 1976 passenger use fell greatly. Platform 2 was taken out of use in 1984 leaving one left in use. The footbridge was demolished and access was by a long footpath. The station and the rest of the line were closed in 1997 for the Croydon Tramlink scheme. Waddon Marsh tram stop of Tramlink was built about 100 yards south of the site of the station.

Aside from lampposts in faded Network SouthEast red paint, little of the original station remains; the footpath that led to the station gives access to the Tramlink Stop.

== See also ==
- West Croydon to Wimbledon Line

Preceding station	Disused railways	Following station
Beddington Lane	Connex South Central; West Croydon to Wimbledon Line	West Croydon
