= Bennetts Mill, Virginia =

Unincorporated community in Virginia, US

Coordinates: 37°15′42″N 80°20′20″W

Bennetts Mill is an unincorporated community in Montgomery County, Virginia, United States.

== History ==
Bennetts Mill contained a post office from 1876 until 1906. M. D. Bennett was an early postmaster.
