= Waddon Marsh tram stop =

Tramlink tram stop in London, England

Waddon Marsh
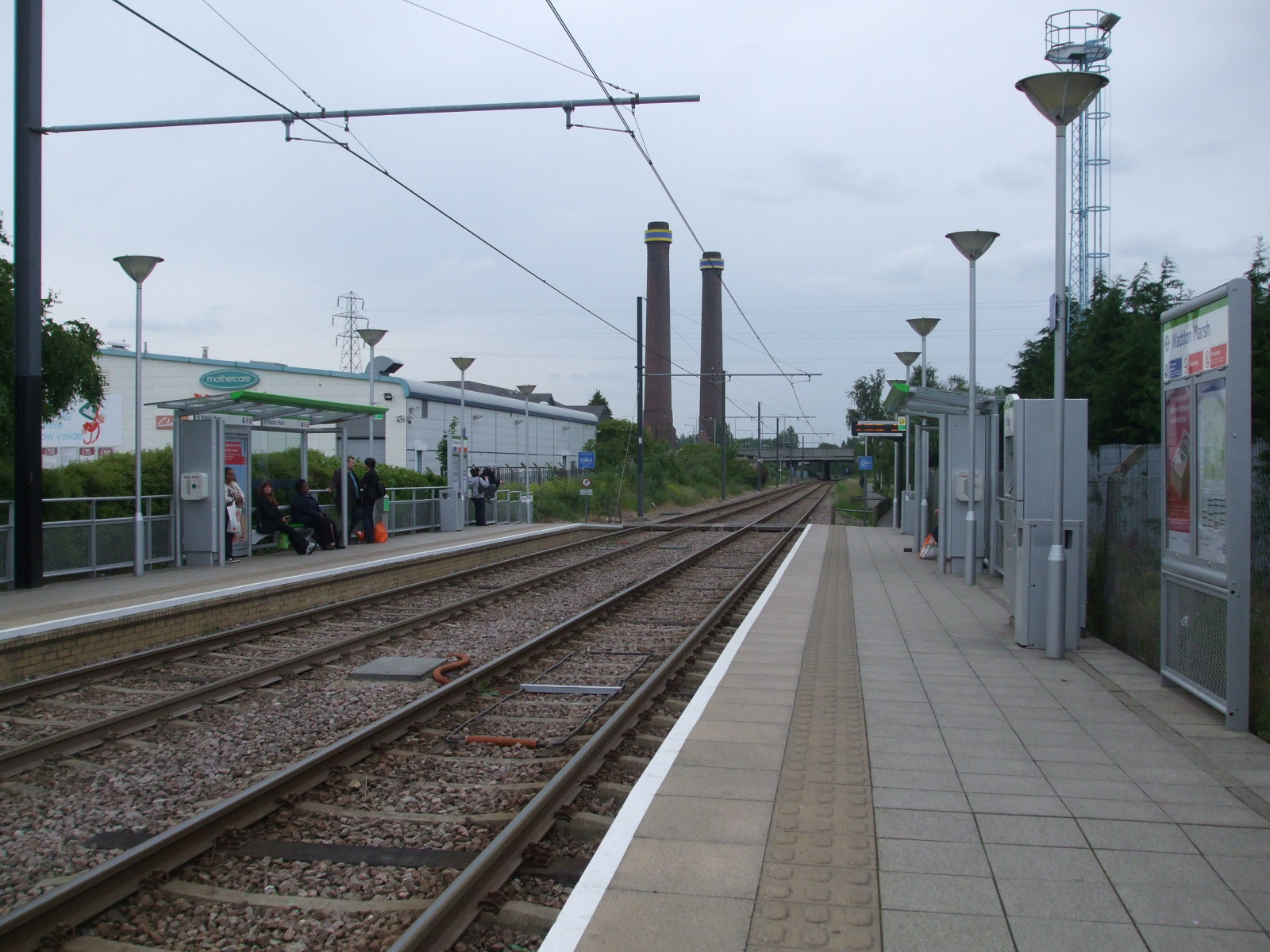
- Looking west

General information
- Location: Purley Way, Croydon
- Coordinates: 51.377°N 0.1179°W
- Operated by: Tramlink
- Platforms: 2

Construction
- Structure type: At-grade
- Accessible: Yes

Other information
- Status: Unstaffed
- Website: Official website

History
- Opened: 30 May 2000
Location
- Location in Croydon

Waddon Marsh tram stop is a stop on the Tramlink service serving the area between Waddon and Croydon in the London Borough of Croydon.

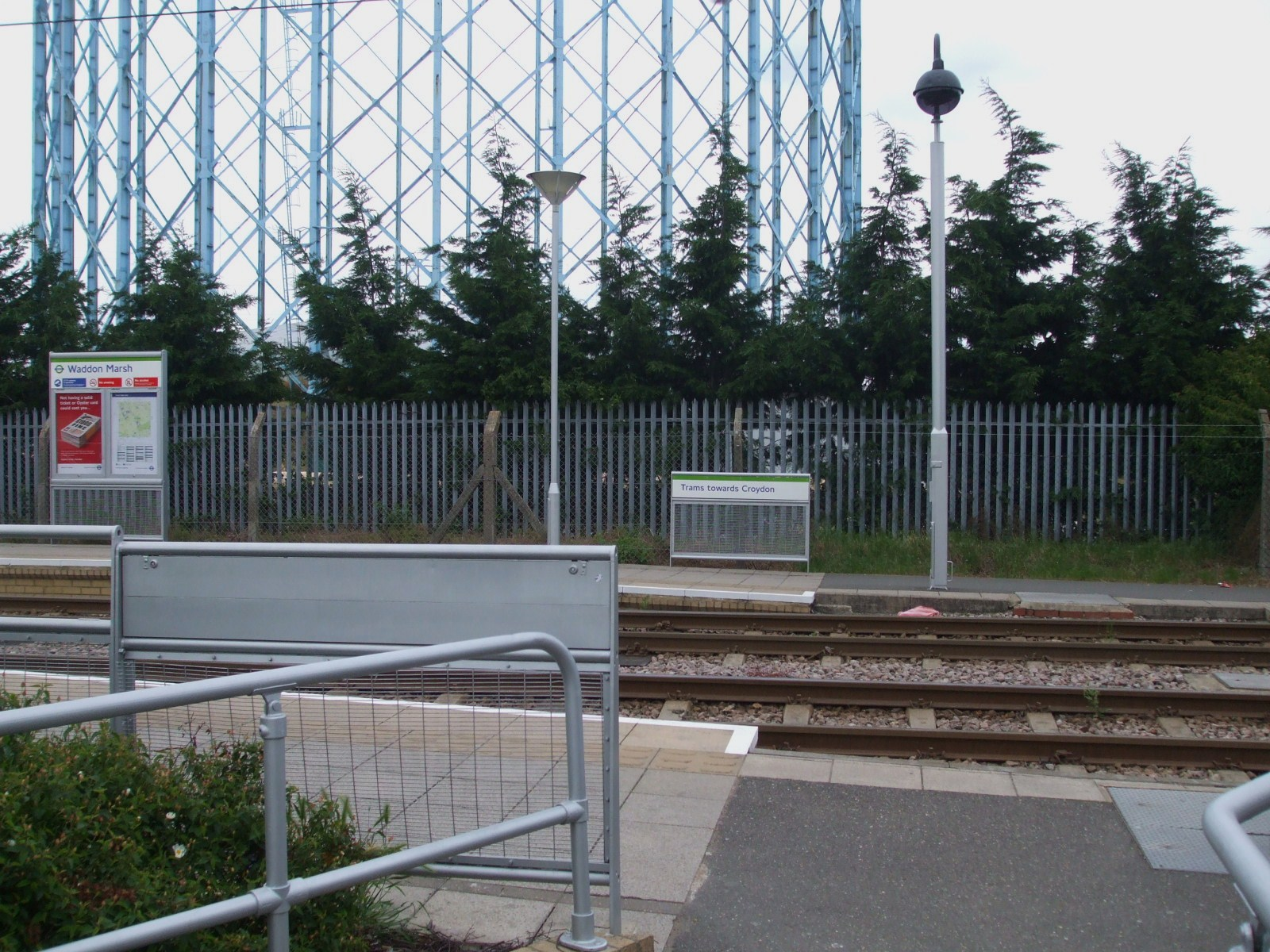
Eastern entrance, with gasometer in background

== History ==
There was previously a railway station about 100 metres north of this site called Waddon Marsh.

== Design ==
All that remains of the previous station is an access path still lined with streetlamps painted NSE red.

== Location ==
It is close to the commercial areas of the Purley Way. The stop is overshadowed by the giant gasometer of Croydon Gas Works.

London Buses routes 289, 439 and S4 serve bus stops near the tram stop. Free interchange for journeys made within an hour is available between trams and buses as part of Transport for London's Hopper fare.

== Services ==
The typical off-peak service in trams per hour from Waddon Marsh is:

- 6 tph in each direction between Beckenham Junction and Wimbledon
- 6 tph in each direction between Elmers End and Wimbledon

Services are operated using Bombardier CR4000 and Stadler Variobahn model low-floor trams.

Preceding station	Tramlink	Following station
Ampere Way towards Wimbledon	Tramlink; Wimbledon to Beckenham Junction	Wandle Park towards Beckenham Junction
Ampere Way towards Wimbledon	Tramlink; Wimbledon to Elmers End	Wandle Park towards Elmers End
