= Wandle Meadow Nature Park =

Nature reserve in London, England

Coordinates: 51.424°N 0.183°W

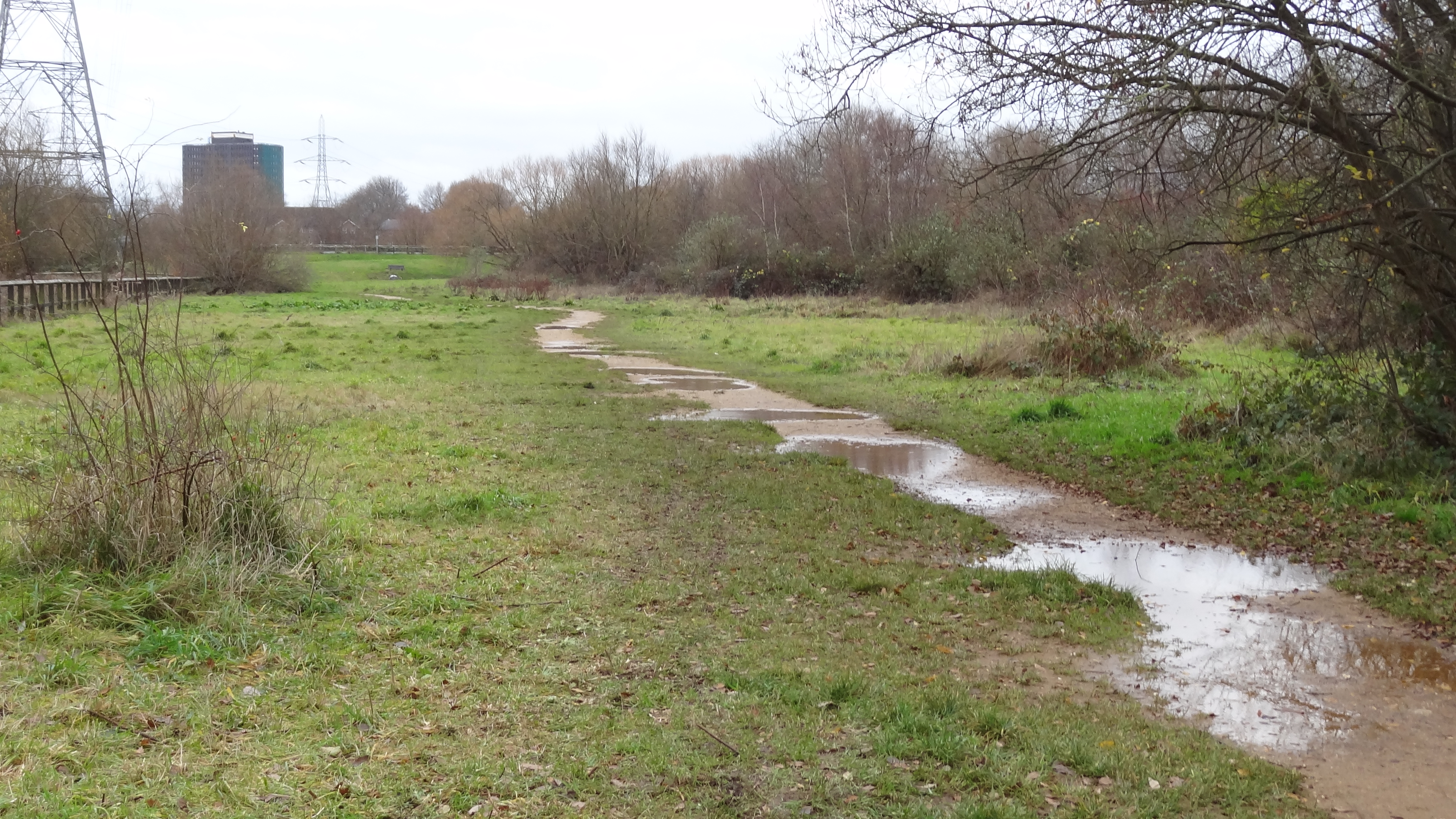

Wandle Meadow Nature Park is a 4.15 hectare local nature reserve and Site of Borough Importance for Nature Conservation, Grade 1, in Colliers Wood in the London Borough of Merton. It is owned and managed by Merton Council.

A map of 1847 shows the site as Byegrove Mead, which may have been managed as water meadows. In 1877 it was acquired by a sewage company, and it formed part of a sewage works until this closed in 1970. A plan to build a stadium for Wimbledon Football Club on the site was strongly opposed by local residents, and in 1989 it was designated as a nature reserve by Merton Council.

The Meadow lies between the River Wandle and Mead Path, part of the Wandle Trail. Wetland plants and animals include small sweet-grass, eared willow and broad-bodied chaser dragonflies. Bullfinches, whitethroats and reed buntings breed in woodland areas. There are also bodies of water which have a variety of frogs, toads and newts.

The Nature Reserve is accessible via Chaucer Way, Boundary Road & North Road in Colliers Wood, a footbridge across the River Wandle from Garfield Road Recreation Ground in South Wimbledon and from a footpath at Plough Lane, Wimbledon.

== See also ==
- Wandle Park, Merton, to the south
