= Wandle Park tram stop =

Tramlink tram stop in London, England

Wandle Park
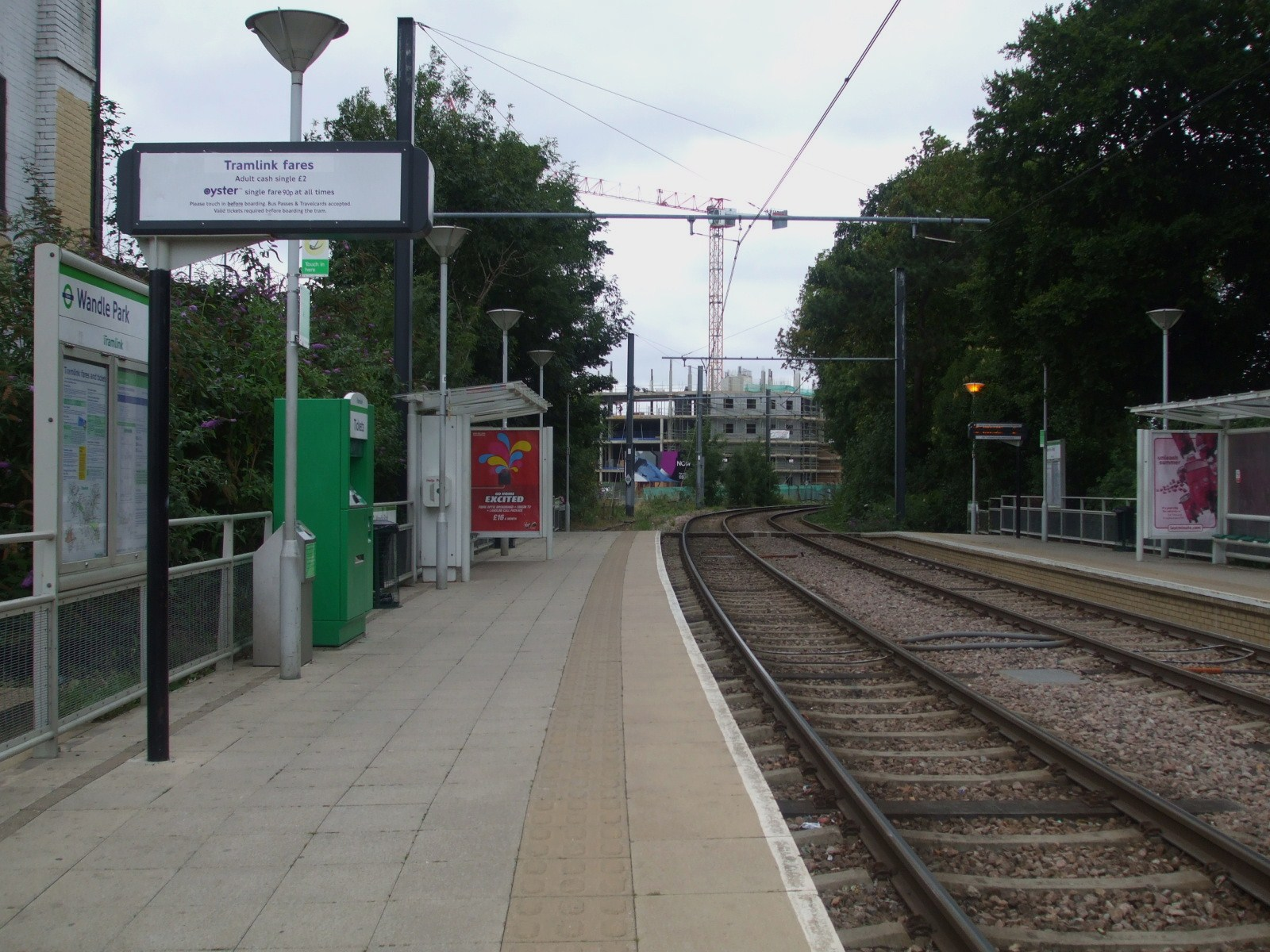
- Westbound platform looking west

General information
- Location: Vicarage Road, Croydon
- Coordinates: 51.3735°N 0.1134°W
- Operator: Tramlink
- Platforms: 2

Construction
- Structure type: At-grade
- Accessible: Yes

Other information
- Status: Unstaffed
- Website: Official website

History
- Opened: 30 May 2000
Location
- Location in Croydon

Wandle Park tram stop is a stop adjacent to Wandle Park in the London Borough of Croydon in the southern suburbs of London. It serves the residential area between central Croydon and Waddon.

The tram stop is located on a double track section of line, with platforms on either side of the track. Immediately to the east of the stop, the line reduces to single track and rises on a steep gradient in order to pass over the railway line on a bridge.

When built technically all Tramlink stops were by request. However, at some point, possibly around 2008, all stops became compulsory.

== Services ==
The typical off-peak service in trams per hour from Wandle Park is:

- 6 tph in each direction between Beckenham Junction and Wimbledon
- 6 tph in each direction between Elmers End and Wimbledon

Services are operated using Bombardier CR4000 and Stadler Variobahn model low-floor trams.

Preceding station	Tramlink	Following station
Waddon Marsh towards Wimbledon	Tramlink; Wimbledon to Beckenham Junction	Reeves Corner towards Beckenham Junction
Waddon Marsh towards Wimbledon	Tramlink; Wimbledon to Beckenham Junction	Church Street One-way operation
Waddon Marsh towards Wimbledon	Tramlink; Wimbledon to Elmers End	Reeves Corner towards Elmers End
Waddon Marsh towards Wimbledon	Tramlink; Wimbledon to Elmers End	Church Street One-way operation

== Connections ==
London Buses routes 407 and 410 serve the tram stop.

Free interchange for journeys made within an hour is available between trams and buses as part of Transport for London's Hopper Fare.
