= Ravensbury Park =

Park in Mitcham, London, England

Coordinates: 51.397°N 0.180°W

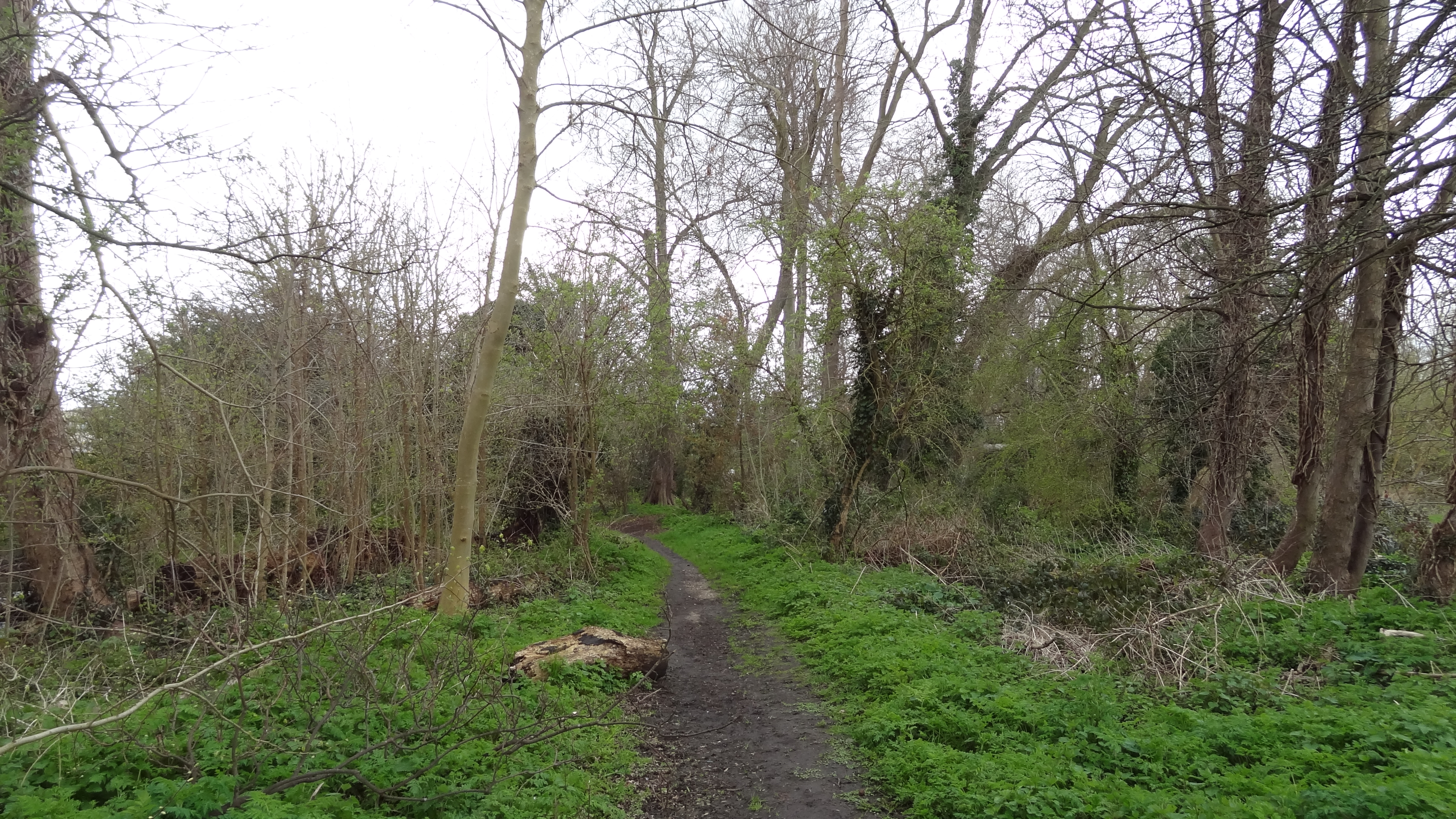
A path through the nature reserve area of Ravensbury Park

Ravensbury Park is a public park in Mitcham in the London Borough of Merton. An area of 7 hectares is designated a Local Nature Reserve. The River Wandle runs along the southern boundary of the park, which is also part of the Upper Wandle River Site of Metropolitan Importance for Nature Conservation.

The park was part of the medieval Ravensbury Manor, which dated back to the thirteenth century. In the seventeenth and eighteenth centuries the site was the location of a calico mill and pleasure gardens. In 1929 Mitcham, Merton and Morden Councils purchased part of the former gardens and opened the site as Ravensbury Park on 10 May 1930. Some of the trees date back two hundred years. Part of the park was later converted to a nature reserve, including a riverside walk along the Wandle. It has a range of wetland birds, extensive woodland and a mixture of wildlife habitats.

There is access from Morden Road, Bishopsford Road and Wandle Road.
