= Wandle Park, Merton =

Park in Colliers Wood, London

Coordinates: 51°25′07″N 0°10′48″W

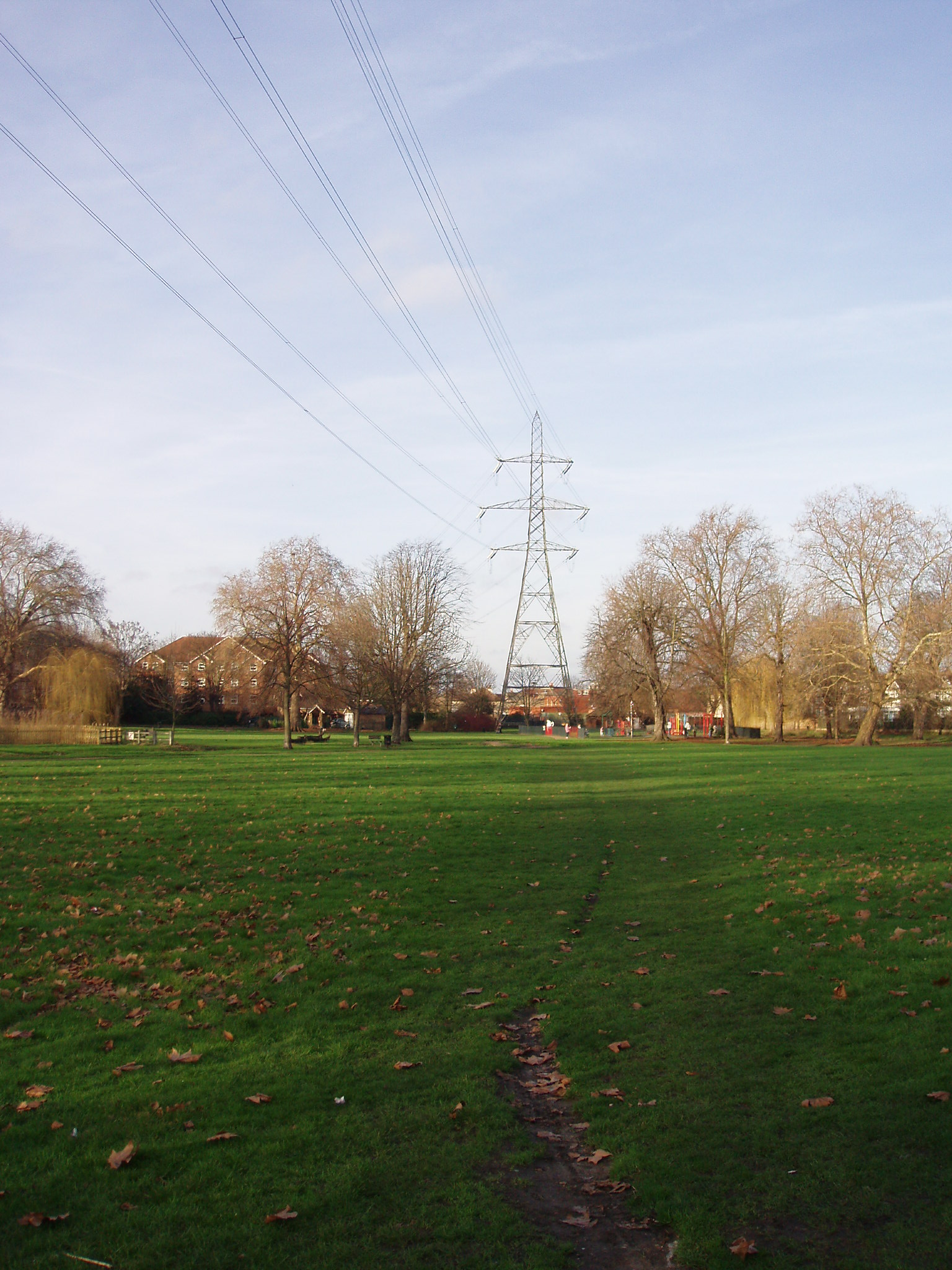
Wandle Park

Wandle Park is a public park in the London Borough of Merton situated in Colliers Wood in south London, England.

The park is located to the south of Wandle Meadow Nature Park and is approximately 11 acres (4.5 ha) in size. It is bounded to the south by Colliers Wood High Street, where there is an entrance, the River Wandle to the west (hence the name), and Byegrove Road to the north.

== History ==
The land was purchased by Wimbledon Corporation for a public park and vested in the National Trust, and the park opened in 1907. In 1910 the Mill Pond Garden was added, purchased by public subscription.

Its footprint contains what was once the site of Wandlebank House and grounds. Recent re-design of the park was undertaken through Merton Groundwork Trust, completed by 2003.

== See also ==
- Wandle Meadow Nature Park
