= River Wandle =

Tributary of the River Thames, England

Coordinates: 51°27′34″N 0°11′37″W

Wandle
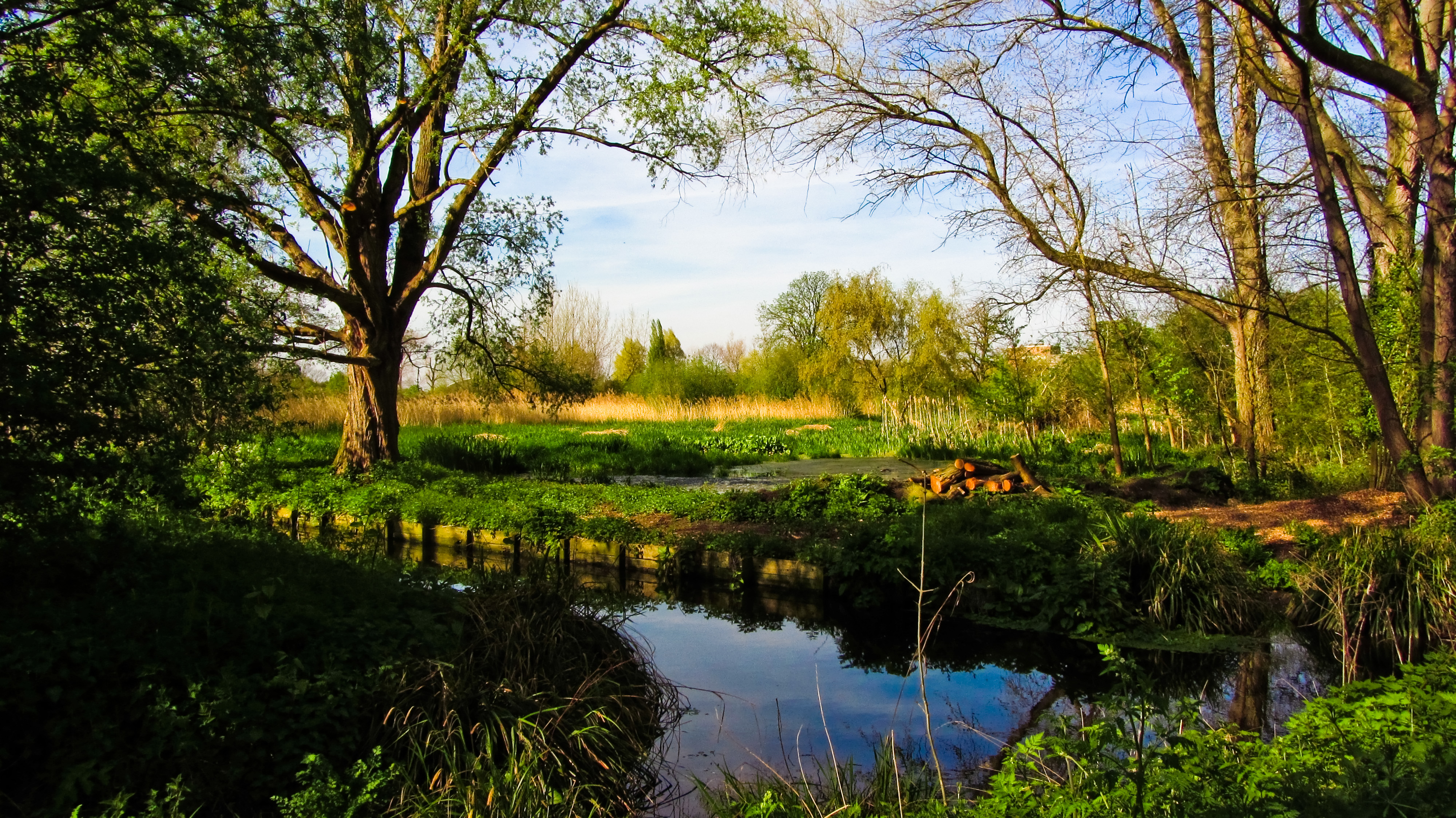
- River Wandle in Morden Hall Park

Location
- Country: England
- Counties: Greater London
- Districts / Boroughs: Croydon, Sutton, Lambeth, Merton, Wandsworth
- Towns: Merton, Morden, Earlsfield, Wandsworth

Physical characteristics
- Source
  - location: Waddon Ponds & Carshalton Ponds
  - elevation: 35 m (115 ft)
- Mouth: River Thames
  - location: Wandsworth
- Length: 14 km (8.7 mi)
- Discharge
  - location: Connollys Mill
  - average: 1.70 m^{3}/s (60 cu ft/s)
  - minimum: 0.22 m^{3}/s (7.8 cu ft/s)29 January 1963
  - maximum: 39.3 m^{3}/s (1,390 cu ft/s)16 September 1968
- Discharge
  - location: Beddington Park
  - average: 0.18 m^{3}/s (6.4 cu ft/s)

Basin features
- Tributaries
  - left: Carshalton Ponds, Carshalton
  - right: River Graveney (Norbury Brook), Pickle Ditch

The River Wandle is a right-bank tributary of the River Thames in south London, England. With a total length of about 9 miles (14 km), the river passes through the London boroughs of Croydon, Sutton, Merton and Wandsworth, where it reaches the Thames. A short headwater – the Caterham Bourne – is partially in Surrey, the historic county of the river's catchment. Tributaries of the Wandle include Carshalton Ponds and Norbury Brook.

The Wandle Trail follows the course of the river from Croydon to Wandsworth.

== Toponym ==
The name is thought to derive from a back-formation of Wandsworth (Old English: Wendelesorde meaning Wendle's Enclosure).

== History and boundaries ==
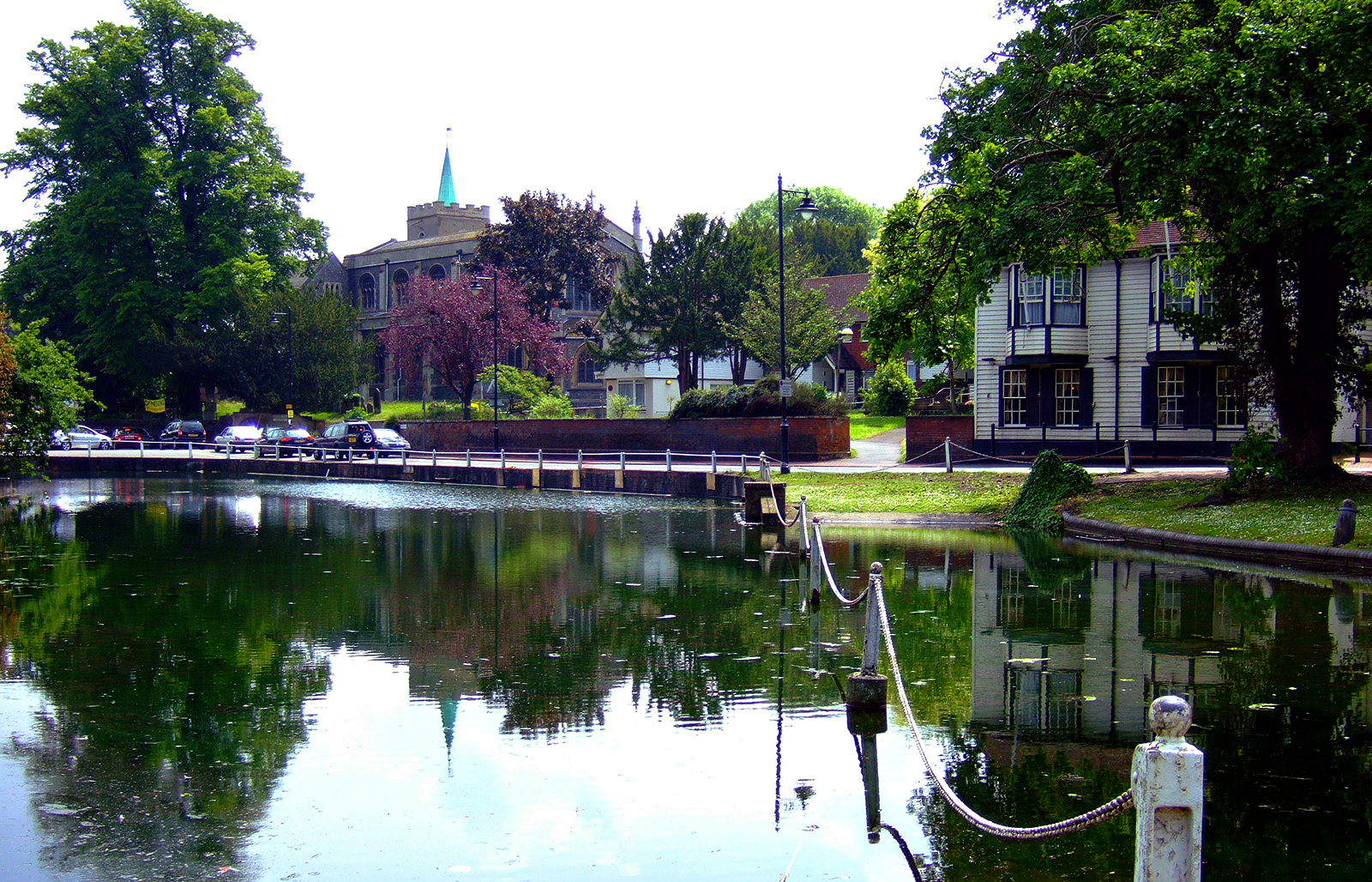
Carshalton Ponds, London Borough of Sutton

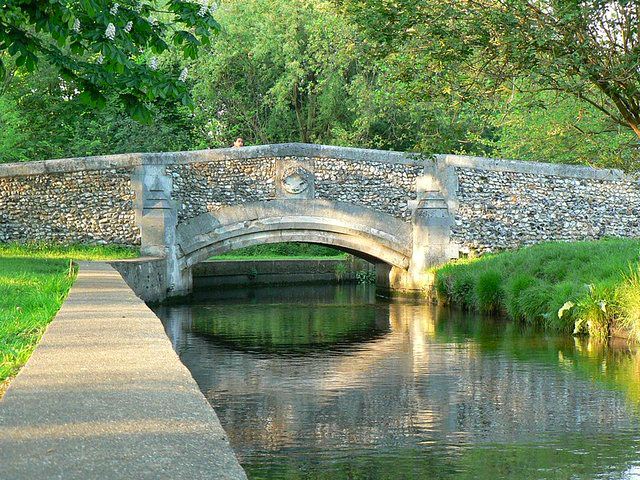
River Wandle at Beddington Park in the London Borough of Sutton

In the pleistocene before the carving of the Mole Gap, water lapped the north of the area between the North Downs and Greensand Hills known as the Vale of Holmesdale taking the Caterham or Coulsdon Bourne routes, to form the much less deep Merstham Gap, a wind gap. In more recent times, precipitation on the local central, small section of the long escarpment percolates through the chalk and reappears as springs in central Croydon, Beddington, and Carshalton. The occasional stream, known as the Bourne, which runs through the Caterham valley (and Smitham Bottom in Coulsdon) is a source of the River Wandle but only surfaces after heavy rainfall. A series of ditches and culverts carries the water from Purley to Croydon.

For many centuries the River Wandle rose from springs including the garden of Blunt House, South End, Croydon and Brighton Road to enter and flow through the Haling neighbourhood in the south of Croydon. It ran along Southbridge Road and upon reaching Old Town it reached a maximal 20 ft (6 m) across and began to divide into smaller channels. The grounds of the Old Palace and Scarbrook Hill had springs engineered with ponds, streams and canals where fish swam, especially trout. Over the years, it became renowned for its fish, and is mentioned in works such as William Camden's Britannia (1586) and Izaak Walton's The Compleat Angler (1653). Lord Nelson would fish in its waters, leading his mistress, Lady Hamilton, to rename the Wandle, as it flowed through her garden, the "River Nile", in Nelson's memory.

However, as Croydon's population grew and use of the water closet increased, the Old Town streams became little more than open sewers and were filled in or culverted from 1840 after outbreaks of typhoid and cholera.

The Wandle then flowed through Pitlake and on through two marshy fields – Froggs Mead and Stubbs Mead – drained to form Wandle Park in 1890. Local springs were used to form a boating lake in the park, but frequent drying up problems led to the lake being filled in and the river was culverted in 1967. In 2012, the Wandle was restored to the surface in Wandle Park. From there, the river continues underground, through where the gas works used to stand, under the Purley Way road past Waddon Ponds and appears on the surface at Richmond Green road, where a small green buffer to its north acts as the green after the footpath at the end of Mill Lane in Waddon, Croydon.

For part of its length, the Wandle forms the boundary between the London Boroughs of Croydon and Lambeth and, further downstream bounds Merton and Wandsworth. Shortly before reaching the Thames the navigable Bell Lane Creek splits from the river, rejoining close to the confluence.

Localities adjoining the river and its mentioned main tributaries include: Croydon, Waddon, Beddington, Wallington, Carshalton, The Wrythe, Hackbridge, Mitcham, Ravensbury, St Helier, Morden, Merton Abbey, Colliers Wood, South Wimbledon, Summerstown, and Wandsworth. Honeywood Museum, in Carshalton Village, includes displays and an interactive map about the River Wandle and its influence on the life of the area.

== Headwaters ==
=== Intermittently visible watercourses ===
Rain falling on part of the North Downs mainly filters through a thin topsoil into chalk and emerges on the spring line and in gentle ravines carved by water erosion. At the top of the catchment, the Wandle has four main headwaters historically noted as winterbournes — streams which only flow when the water table is high.

Two such streams, culverted, combine in Central Croydon beneath Bourne Street to form the Wandle which emerges immediately north-west in Wandle Park. The Wandle is piped part-way-through neighbouring New South Quarter to flow under Purley Way (formerly Waddon Marsh Lane) and part of its retail park. From its central gathering the flow is westwards (or WSW) until merging with the Carshalton branch. On its route the early Wandle surfaces to receive springs at a long lake Waddon Ponds beside Mill Lane, Croydon.

The Coulsdon Bourne and linked Caterham Bourne south of Croydon town centre ran in wet seasons. They have been culverted since before 1900. When the water table is medium or high these waters meet at Purley, run in a culvert the length of the Brighton Road, South Croydon, and merge into the surface water drains and culverts in the town centre (which become much of the above stream).

=== The Norbury Brook ===
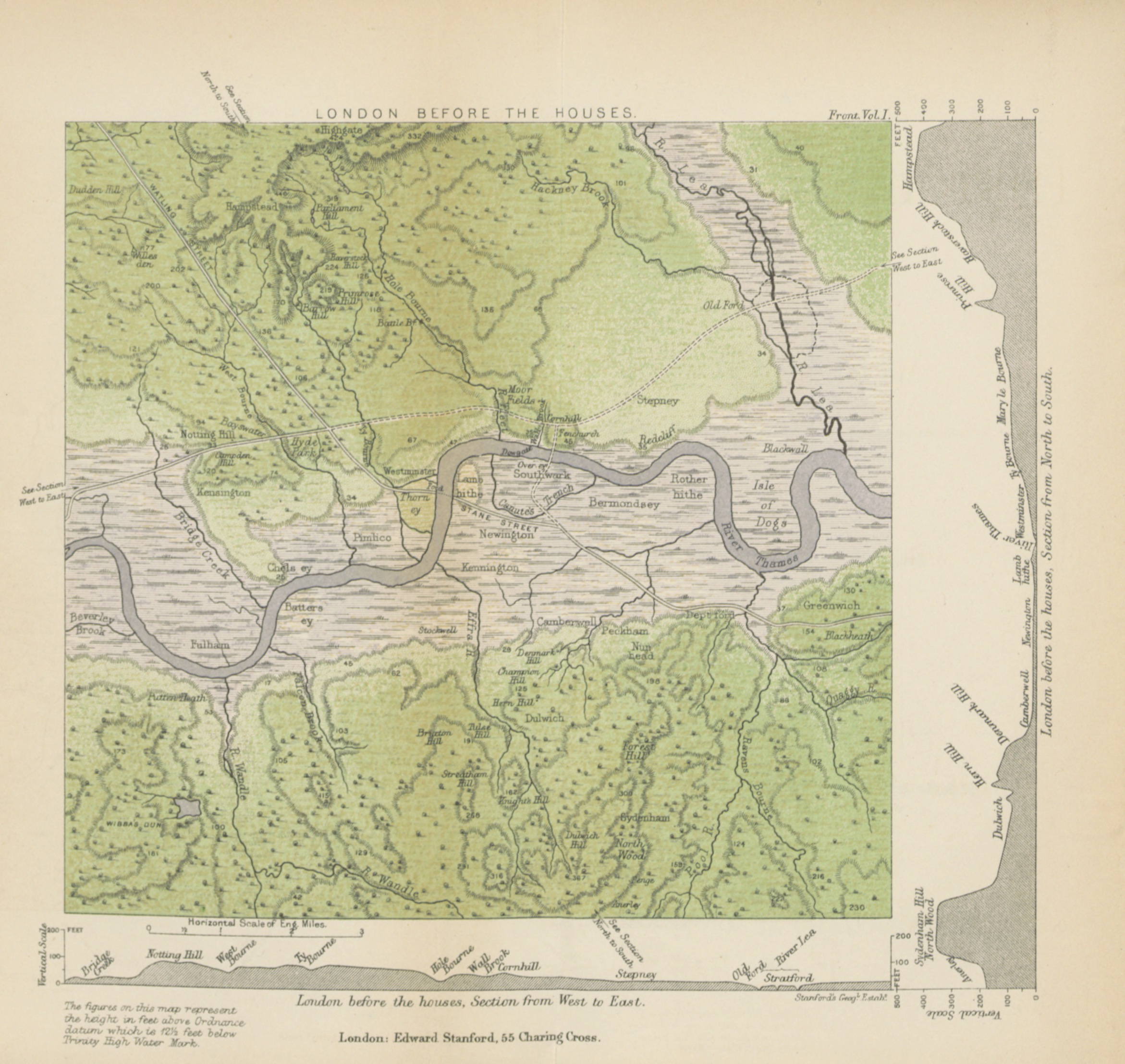
Plate from A History of London, by W.E. Loftie, 1884, titled London Before the Houses, showing the Wandle and the eastern branch also wrongly labelled the Wandle, which is the Norbury Brook.

The Norbury Brook is in its western section for parochial boundaries called the Graveney River. Aggregated streams combine under Grant Road, Addiscombe. Straightened, it roughly bounds Croydon and Lambeth Boroughs forming the ancient boundary of Croydon and Norwood (once the large woodland in Norbury parish). Its long, culverted mouth with the Wandle is in Tooting Graveney – it meets the Wandle fronting the Haydons Road part of Wimbledon in the Borough of Merton.

== Industry ==
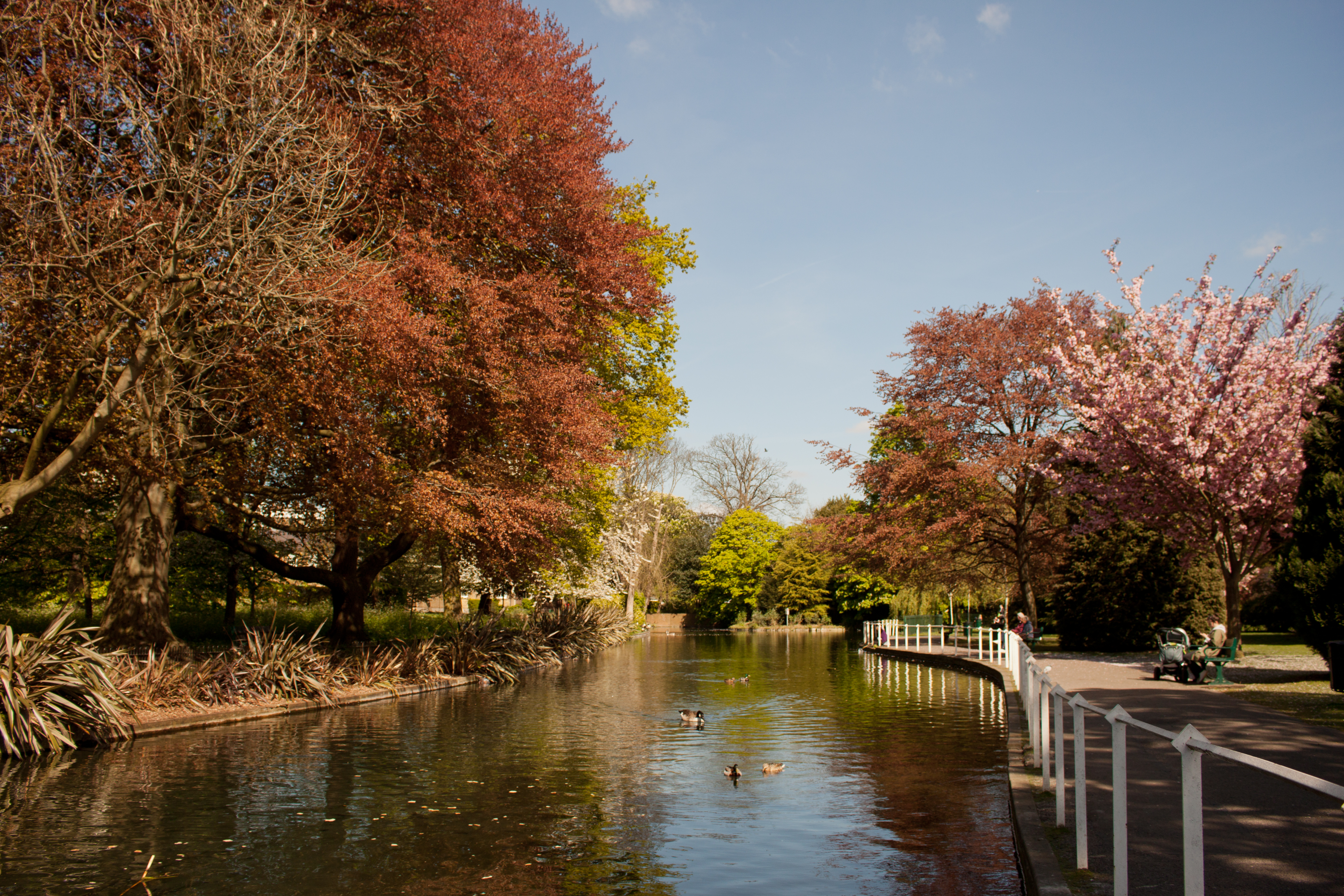
River Wandle in Carshalton

The river has been well-used since Roman times; in the 17th century Huguenots were attracted by the cloth and textile mills which lined the banks of the river. It was heavily industrialised in the 18th and 19th centuries, during the Industrial Revolution, and was declared one of the most polluted rivers in England. The main industries then were tobacco and textiles. The river was used to power 68 water wheels, of which only a few survive, such as at Merton Abbey Mills for the production of paper, print and tapestries.

The Liberty print works (latterly Merton Abbey Mills) and Merton Board Mills dominated the riverscape with the board mills being demolished in the 1990s (the site was redeveloped into a Sainsbury’s Savacentre). Local concentration of heavy industry resulted in multiple leats being cut during the 18th century; a remnant of the old courses, the Pickle, is two ditches, one running beneath Liberty Avenue. The former leat has become the main river next to Merton Abbey Mills craft village.

Clean-ups of the Wandle have improved the water quality dramatically, leading to a return of the river's brown trout. This improvement in water quality has also seen other fish thrive with stocks of chub, roach and dace all flourishing once again with the most popular angling spots being in Hackbridge and Colliers Wood.

== Local nature reserves ==
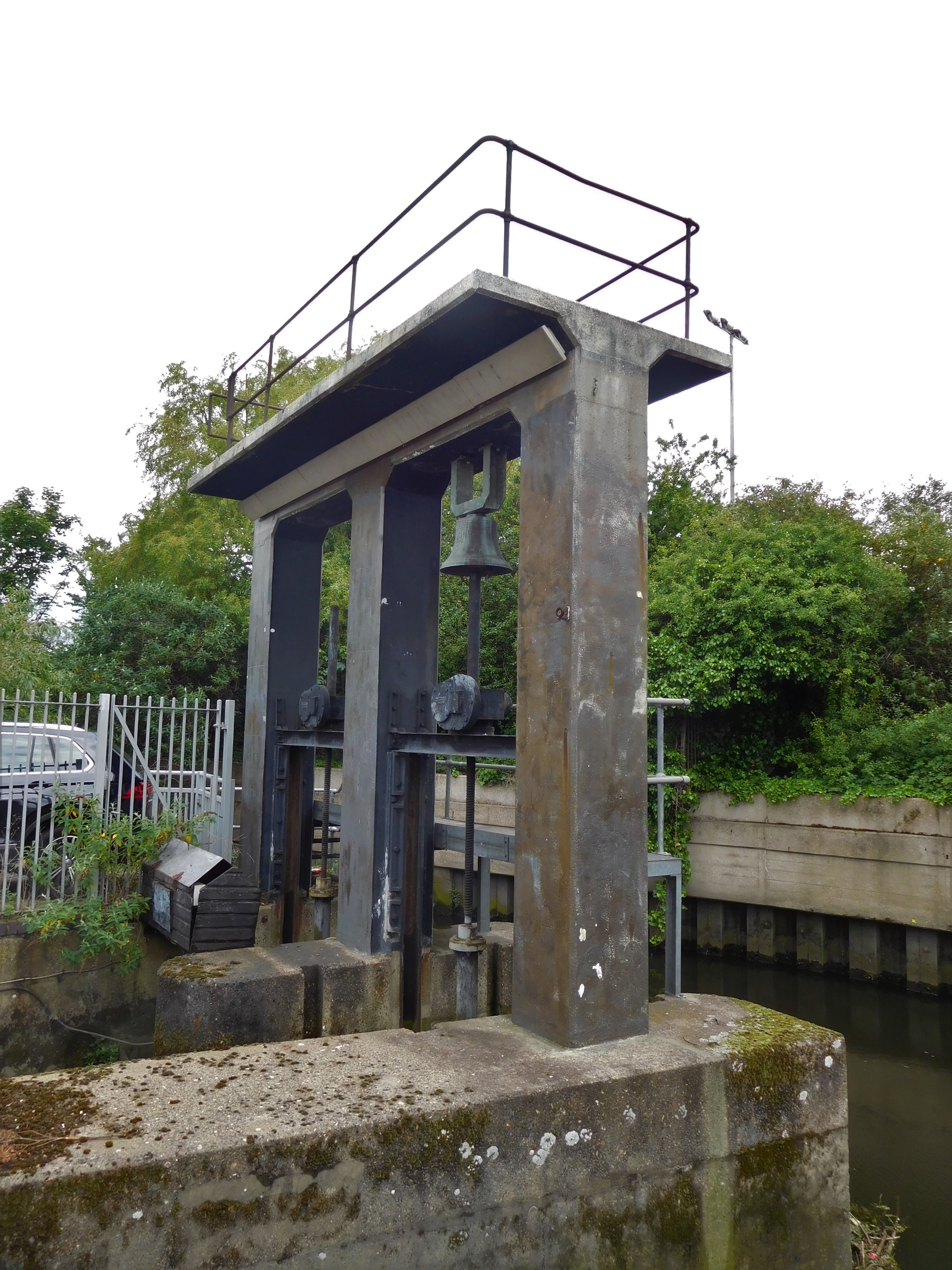
A bell powered by the rising and falling tide at the southern end of Bell Lane Creek, the highest tidal point on the Wandle

A stretch of the river between Trewint Street and Plough Lane in Merton has been designated as the Lower Wandle Local Nature Reserve (LNR). It is lined by mature trees and patches of grassland. South of the Lower Wandle, an area of wetland between the River Wandle and the Wandle trail is the Wandle Meadow Nature Park LNR. Another LNR adjacent to the Wandle is the Wandle Valley Wetland in Carshalton.

In 2017, a new nature reserve was created in Bell Lane Creek at the confluence of the Wandle and the Thames, by removing a half-tide weir that had been installed in the 1980s. This had been built as the first part of a project to create a marina, however it had ceased to work some years previously. Restoring it would allow the tide to clear out silt and restore a natural tidal river. In addition, a section of the Thames river wall was lowered as part of the Wandsworth Riverside Quarter residential development, to allow reeds and vegetation to develop and provide a more natural sloping embankment. As part of the project, layers of contaminated sediment were dredged from the site, to restore a gravel bed and restore a wildlife habitat measuring roughly a hectare in size.

== Incidents ==
=== 21st century hazardous discharges ===
On 17 September 2007, Sodium hypochlorite was accidentally flushed into the Wandle from Thames Water's Beddington sewage works. The chemical was being used to clean its tertiary treatment screens. Its use is permitted if captured ("re-circulated") for further treatment. The discharge killed over 2,000 fish of various species. The sewerage undertaker failed to notify the Environment Agency – its site manager thought it was minor. The company apologised; it offered to meet local angling clubs and the Wandle Trust to discuss restocking and long-term support for the Trust's work. The regulator fined the provider £125,000 and legal costs. In 2009 it was the greatest penalty for a one-day unlawful discharge into controlled waters. In 2010 a High Court judge found the fine was under the statutory rules governing pollution penalties "manifestly" excessive, reducing it to £50,000, noting Thames Water had donated £500,000 to clean up the river.

On 18 February 2025, an estimated 4,000 litres (880 imp gal; 1,100 US gal) of diesel was released into the river, polluting it from Beddington to Wandsworth. The source was reportedly a storage tank at a bus depot in Thornton Heath, Croydon.

== Makeup ==
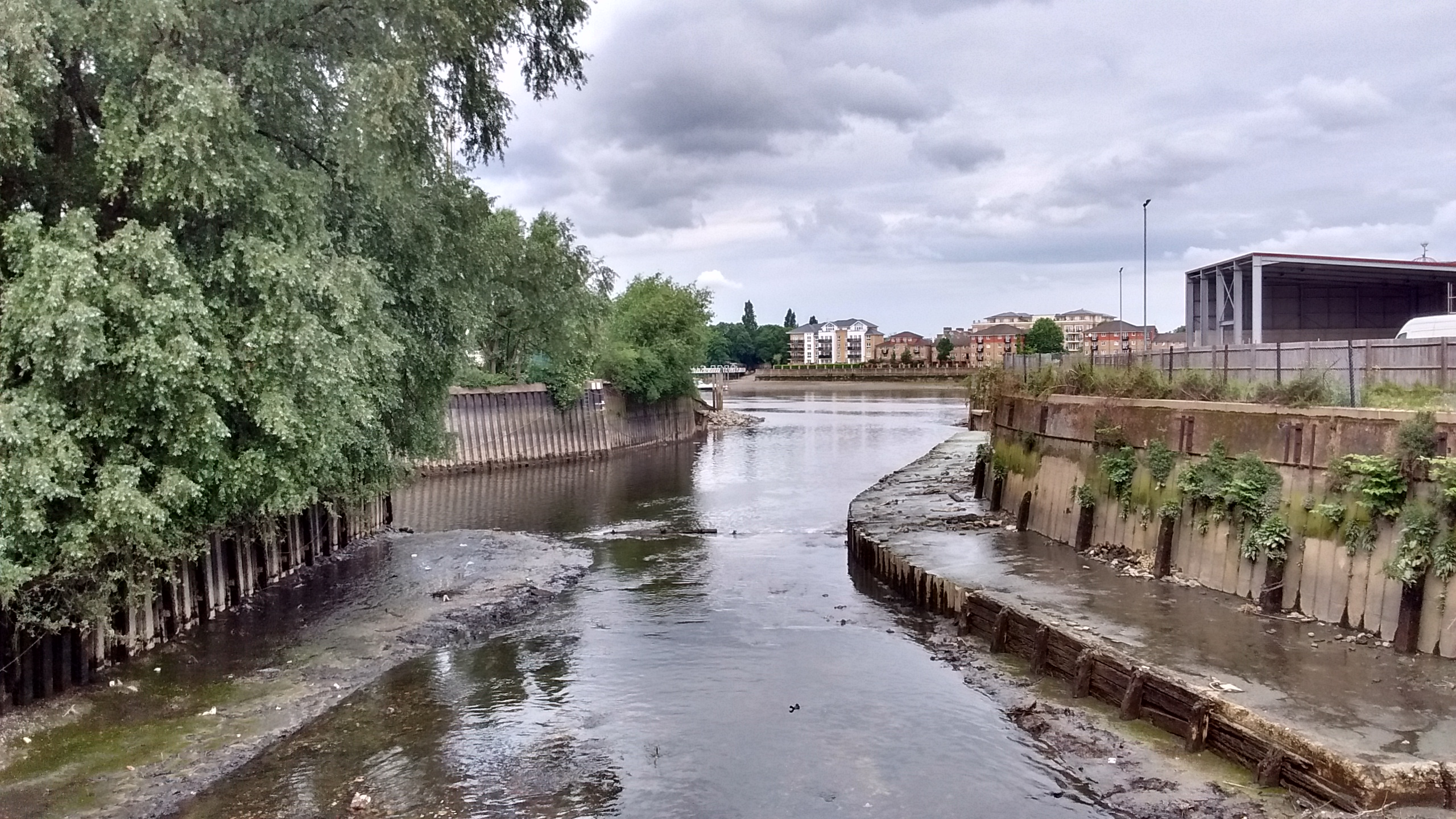
Tidal section of the Wandle, where it joins the River Thames

The predominant geology of the south part is chalk interspersed with flint and narrow alluvial gravel beds in the south. London clay overlaid with patches of gravel topped by deeper humus forms the north; the top soil, tempered by the chalk beneath is less acidic where still seasonally turned in the south.

The river has since the 18th century been largely terraformed with tributary artificial channels (becoming surface water drains) and runoff ditches. It has relatively few underground (culverted) stretches; these are in Croydon.

== Water quality ==
The Environment Agency measures the water quality of the river systems in England. Each is given an overall ecological status, which may be one of five levels: high, good, moderate, poor and bad. There are several components that are used to determine this, including biological status, which looks at the quantity and varieties of invertebrates, angiosperms and fish. Chemical status, which compares the concentrations of various chemicals against known safe concentrations, is rated good or fail.

Water quality of the River Wandle in 2019
Section	Ecological Status	Chemical Status	Overall Status	Length	Catchment	Channel
Wandle (Carshalton Branch at Carshalton)	Bad	Fail	Bad	2.206 km (1.371 mi)	11.129 km^{2} (4.297 sq mi)	heavily modified
Wandle (Croydon to Wandsworth) and the Graveney	Moderate	Fail	Moderate	24.079 km (14.962 mi)	179.161 km^{2} (69.174 sq mi)	heavily modified

== Namesakes ==
Current

- The Wandle River in South Island, New Zealand.
- The SS Wandle, four successive steamships. Three were built for the local Wandsworth, Wimbledon and Epsom District Gas Company.

Former

In the 1980s Wandle was designated as one of the London bus districts. Its logo was a water wheel above the London Transport roundel.

== Landmarks ==
Current

- A signposted link to the Thames Path exists in the north including its riverside at Wandsworth Park
- Bridges, one with an information plaque, cross the river at Wandsworth High Street and its central park, dotted with high rise housing.
- Plough Lane football stadium since 2020

Former

- Plough Lane football stadium to 1998
- Wimbledon Stadium – greyhound racing track to 2017
- Site of the Ram Brewery – to 2006

== See also ==
- Tributaries of the River Thames
- List of rivers in England
- Wandle Trail
- Wandle Meadow Nature Park

== Notes and references ==
Next confluence upstream	River Thames	Next confluence downstream
Beverley Brook (south)	River Wandle	Falconbrook (south)
