= Wandle Park, Croydon =

Public park in the London Borough of Croydon

Wandle Park
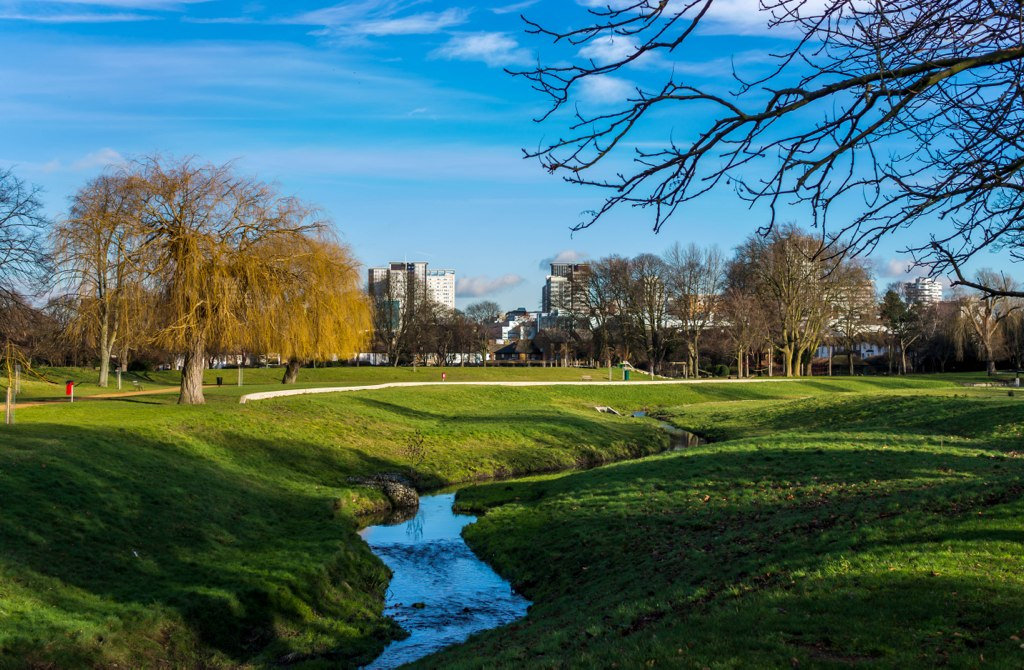
- Wandle Park in 2014
- Interactive map of Wandle Park
- Type: Public park
- Location: Croydon
- Coordinates: 51°22′28″N 0°06′41″W
- Area: 8.5-hectare (21-acre)
- Opened: 14 May 1890
- Operator: London Borough of Croydon
- Open: 08:00 - 16:30 Nov, Dec, Jan; 08:00 - 17:30 Feb; 08:00 - 18:30 Mar, Oct; 08:00 - 19:30 Sep; 08:00 - 20:00 Apr; 08:00 - 20:30 Aug; 08:00 - 21:00 May; 08:00 - 21:30 Jun, Jul
- Status: Open daily, all year
- Water: Pond; River Wandle
- Designation: Fields in Trust
- Parking: Currently closed
- Public transit: Wandle Park tram stop, Bus routes: 157 Rectory Grove 407, 410, 455, 645 Rectory Grove or Vicarage Road
- Facilities: Bandstand; Basketball court Bench seats Café / Kiosk; Children's playground Community garden Cricket pitch (all season); Fitness stations Rose garden Skate park Tennis court Toilets; Water fountain

Wandle Park is an 8.5-hectare (21-acre) park located in the Broad Green Ward of Croydon, south London, England. It was opened in 1890 by the Mayor of Croydon. The site is protected by Fields in Trust through a legal "Deed of Dedication" safeguarding the future of the space as public recreation land for future generations to enjoy.

The River Wandle flows through the park. Between 1967 and 2012 this was in an underground culvert which was constructed by Croydon Council. The park used to contain a boating lake which dried up and was filled in.

The park is used by many people and is popular with dog walkers, footballers, joggers, skateboarders and families. The park is easily accessible by public transport using Wandle Park tram stop. The park has a 'Friends Group' of local residents and park users that are working with Croydon Council to improve the park.

== Geology ==
River terrace gravels make up the underlying geology of Wandle Park which is composed of succession Woolwich Beds and Reading Beds, Thanet Sands and Upper Chalk. The Thanet Sand Formation makes up part of the water-bearing Chalk-Basal Sands aquifer of the London Basin. The gravel was deposited during Pleistocene period and has been substantially reworked since then by periglacial, fluvial and anthropogenic impacts.

The British Museum has a 897 mm (35.3 in) ceremonial middle bronze age spearhead recovered from a gravel pit 2.3m down near the River Wandle that Needham (and others) claim was on the site of today's Wandle Park. The spear-head was deliberately broken in five pieces and found sometime before 1901.

== History ==
...under the low red roofs of Croydon, and by the cress-set rivulets in which the sand danced and minnows darted above the Springs of Wandel

— John Ruskin, Praeterita

One of the oldest public open spaces in Croydon, Wandle Park was built to meet the leisure and recreation needs of the population of a growing industrial town.

=== Frog Mead and Stubbs Mead ===
The park was formed from two watermeadows to the west of Croydon town called Frog Mead and Stubbs Mead. These meadows can be dated back to at least 1543. They are both shown for context on the boundary of a 1692 map of the manor of Waddon. At about 30 acres, Stubbs Mead was the larger of the two meadows lying to the north of the Wandle, and Frog Mead to the south. In 1797 Frog Mead was in the ownership of Daniel Richard Warrington. It subsequently expanded to about 7 or 8 acres, bounded on the south by the Wimbledon and Croydon railway.

Stubbs Mead was part of the Archbishop of Canterbury's land holdings in Croydon. The Archbishops had long held land in Croydon and their presence was recorded in the Domesday Book. Around 1800, at least part of Stubbs Mead (near the barracks) was used as a bleaching ground by William Lane and Benjamin Lay and a portion of Stubbs Mead towards the north was isolated by the Surrey Iron Railway by 1803. Part of the railway's course survives as a section of Factory Lane, while the isolated land became home to an iron works and an electricity generating station.

By 1852 the Local Board of Health had built a sewage filter house at Pitlake on the edge of today's Wandle Park, near the south end of Cuthbert Road. It separated the solids using perforated zinc plates so the liquids could flow into the Wandle. The solids were sold as manure and carted off to local farms. Unfortunately some of the solids were broken up into a slurry in the sewers and passed into the Wandle. Raw sewage also flowed into the Wandle when the Bourne rose, because the flow was too great for the filter house. The health board also used Mr. Waterman's 17 acre Brimstone Farm field adjacent to Stubbs Mead for sewage irrigation, which became a cesspool. Both of these works were heavily criticised and by 1859 a new sewage plant was subsequently opened at Brimstone Barn, at today's recycling centre in Factory lane.

In 1867 the Croydon Fair could no longer be held at Fairfield, because the land had been taken by the Brighton Railway Company. The cattle fair was held at Addiscombe and despite intentions to ban it, the pleasure fair was held on Stubbs Mead. The following year the pleasure fair was banned at the last minute, which led to a riot. The cattle fair continued for many years. Stubbs Mead was used to host other fairs and fetes, as well as cricket matches and other recreational activities. It is perhaps no surprise there was a petition of over 800 people in 1887 to purchase Stubbs Mead for a recreation ground. From 1888 part of Stubbs Mead was rented by the council for allotments, and where Alice Whye was murdered on 24 May 1936 Her assailant, Wallace Jenden, was hung at Wandsworth prison by Thomas Pierrepoint.

=== Wandle Park ===
According to Alderman Coldwells, the necessity of recreation grounds for the welfare of Croydon had been established by the Croydon Board of Health, who had purchased Duppas Hill in 1865. Others saw recreation grounds as a way of attracting home buyers to Croydon and there was a desire for every ward in Croydon to have a recreation ground. Thornton Heath Recreation Ground was opened in 1884 and there were no objections at a public inquiry in 1887 to borrow a further £6,000 for the purchase and development of land for Park Hill Recreation Ground. There was an urgency because it was perceived the whole of Croydon was being built upon. The council budgeted £25,000 for the remaining wards, which with the expenditure on the existing recreation grounds represented a rate rise of 1d in the £ (a 0.4% increase, although this would be absorbed by the town's growth). Six thousand pounds was allocated for a recreation ground in the west ward, for which Frog Mead and Stubbs Mead were being considered. In 1885 the sanitary committee had attempted to purchase Frog Mead for an infectious hospital, but the owners (Briton Medical & General Life Association Limited) went into liquidation before the sale could be completed. The sanitary committee abandoned the site, partly due to public opposition and the liquidators were subsequently willing to sell the site for something under £1,600. The Ecclesiastical Commission was willing to sell the whole of Stubbs Mead, but the budget limited what could be purchased. After negotiation, the Ecclesiastical Commission matched the Frog Mead price of £200/acre and 13½ acres of Stubbs Mead was purchased with Frog Mead, leaving about £1,700 to lay out the park and build two footbridges across the railway.

The deed of sale records that Croydon Corporation bought Frog Mead in 1888 from the Briton Medical & General Life Association Limited for £1,518. 15s. On 12 December 1889, Croydon Corporation bought Stubbs Mead from the Ecclesiastical Commissioners for £2,700. The indenture states that "The land shall be forever dedicated and used as an ornamental pleasure ground and place of recreation for the inhabitants of the Borough of Croydon and for no other purpose whatsoever."

Improvements to the park were overseen by the corporation's Road Committee. Minutes of the Committee available in Croydon's Local Studies Library record that a Mr W. Powell, the Roads Surveyor was instructed to draw up plans and obtain prices for the works. The centrepiece of the new park was an artificial boating lake with an island in the centre planted with trees. It was proposed to divert the River Wandle to feed the lake with water but whilst the lake was being constructed sufficient groundwater was found for this purpose. Proposals were then modified and a separate channel took the river to the north of the boating lake. The lake was initially limited to just four boats, to be hired out at an affordable rate. John Hubert Schmitz, the Mayor of Croydon, opened Wandle Park on 14 May 1890, which was attended in the evening by approximately 50,000 - 60,000 people. Being a Wednesday, shops closed early and a procession of various bands, school children and friendly societies marched from Katharine Street, followed by dignitaries in carriages. The procession went down the High Street, North End and London Rd to Broad Green into Sumner and Handcroft roads, which at the time continued to Pitlake and Westfield Road, the main entrance to Wandle Park. After the opening ceremony there were activities to entertain the children, while the park was illuminated by electricity in the evening and finished with fireworks.

The park is featured in postcards produced at the turn of the 20th century which frequently record people enjoying the lake. In the early 20th century the lake was extended to the east and another island created that could be reached by two rustic bridges. By the 1930s there was a bandstand, bowling green (with pavilion) and tennis courts and the park was the venue for the Borough's Summer Show. The lake was just 3 feet (0.91 m) deep to be “perfectly safe for skating” and the park’s noticeboard shows a photograph from the local studies and archive centre of people on the frozen lake. Other photographs of the time show that the water level in the lake was found to be erratic and it completely dried up at times in the summer.

In 1967, a concrete culvert was constructed, the river was diverted into it, and the old river bed filled in. The River Wandle was buried from view and at the same time the then dry lake was filled in, topsoiled and grassed. The former course of the river was able to be traced by following a line of trees that cross the park. A flint wall on the southern side of the former location of the children's playground is also thought to be part of the wall on the north side of the river. A rose garden was created in the 1970s next to the sports pavilion and more recently a skatepark was provided on the site of the old tennis courts.

== Regeneration ==
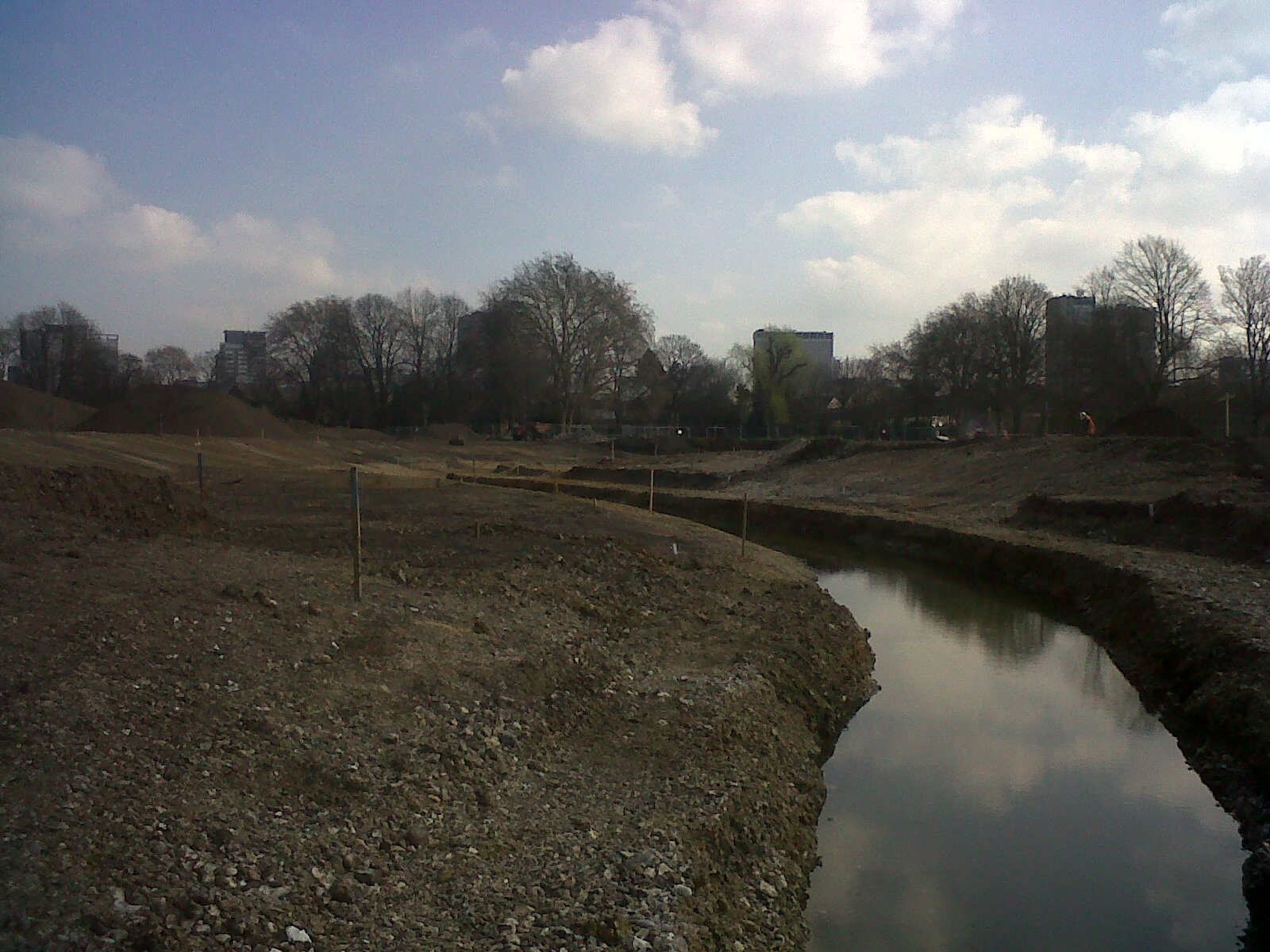
Restoration of the River Wandle in Wandle Park, in 2012

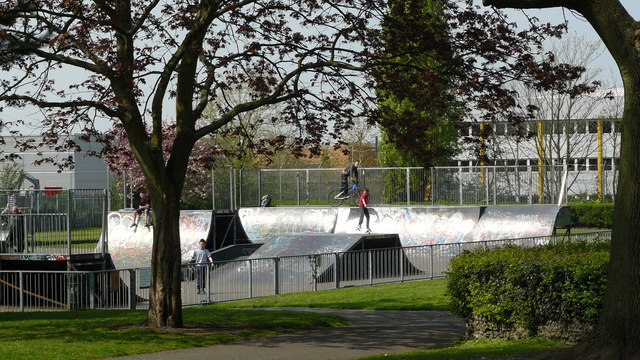
The skate park

Plans were drawn up in 2010 which proposed bringing the river to the surface and provide facilities including a new cafe, changing facilities, bandstand, pond, multi-use games area, a new playspace and skatepark. A basketball court and a tennis court are located near the skate park. The park has received funding from the adjoining British Gas Site (Barratt Homes providing a Section 106 contribution as part of their planning consent), the Environment Agency, Croydon Council, Heritage Lottery Fund and the Mayor of London's Help a London Park Scheme.

Work on the restoration of the River Wandle within the park began on 14 November 2011, with works to a new skate park and ball courts. The entire park closed on 9 January 2012 for the river restoration works. The upgraded skate park and games area opened on 11 May 2012, and most of the park reopened at the end of December 2012. The new bridge was installed in March 2013. The new play-space opened in the summer of 2013 when the grass under the new facilities became established. The refurbished pavilion was finished in December 2013, with the cafe opening to the public in July 2014.

== Sources ==
- Arnott, Neil; Page, Thomas (21 April 1853). Reports ... on an Inquiry Ordered by the Secretary of State, Relative to the Prevalence of Disease at Croydon, and to the Plan of Sewerage. London: G.E. Eyre and W. Spottiswoode.
- Grainger, Richard Duggard; Austin, Henry (18 February 1853). House of Lords Sessional Papers: Reports on the epidemic at Croydon. Vol. 77.
