= Social Democratic Party election results =

Election results for British political party

The Social Democratic Party was a centre-left to centrist political party in the United Kingdom. It was formed in 1981 and was dissolved in 1988 when it merged with the Liberal Party to form Liberal Democrats.

This article encompasses results of historical UK general elections and European Parliament elections which the Social Democratic Party participated in.

== Westminster elections ==
=== Summary of UK general election performance ===
Year	No. of Candidates	Total votes	Mean votes per candidate	% UK vote	Change % +/-	Saved deposits	No. of MPs
1983	311	3,570,834	11,482	11.7%	New	—	6
1987	306	3,168,183	10,354	9.7%	▼1.9%	—	5

=== Parliamentary by-elections, 1981–1983 ===
Through by-elections during the 1979–1983 UK Parliament, the SDP succeeded in electing 2 Social Democrat MPs.

SDP results in Parliamentary by-elections from 1981 to 1983
Election	Candidate	Votes	%	Position	1979				Result	By-election			
Election	Candidate	Votes	%	Position	LAB	LIB	CON	OTH	Result	LAB	SDP	CON	OTH
1981 Warrington by-election	Roy Jenkins	12,521	42.40	2	61.6	9.1	28.8	9.6	LAB hold	48.4	42.4	7.1	2.1
1981 Crosby by-election	Shirley Williams	28,118	49.0	1	25.4	15.2	57.0	2.4	SDP gain from CON	9.5	49.1	39.8	1.6
1982 Glasgow Hillhead by-election	Roy Jenkins	10,106	33.40	1	34.4	14.4	41.0	10.1	SDP gain from CON	25.9	33.4	26.6	14.1
1982 Mitcham and Morden by-election	Bruce Douglas-Mann	9,032	29.40	2	45.2	8.9	43.9	2.0	CON gain from LAB	24.4	29.4	43.4	2.8
1982 Gower by-election	Gwynoro Jones	9,875	25.10	2	53.2	9.1	30.6	7.2	LAB hold	43.5	25.1	22.1	9.3
1982 Peckham by-election	Dick Taverne	7,418	32.91	2	59.9	7.7	28.1		LAB hold	50.3	32.9	12.4	4.4
1983 Darlington by-election	Anthony Cook	12,735	24.5	3	45.6	10.2	43.4	0.9	LAB hold	39.5	24.5	34.9	1.1

=== General election 1983 ===
SPD results in the 1983 general election
Constituency	Candidate	Votes	%	Position	Result
Aberdeen North	Colin Stirling Deans	10,118	24.7	2nd	LAB hold
Aberdeen South	Ian Philip	10,372	26.2	3rd	CON hold, but SDP and LAB together outpolled them
Aldridge-Brownhills	Peter Gunn	11,599	24.4	3rd	CON hold
Alyn and Deeside	Eric Cyril Hammersley Owen	9,535	21.6	3rd	LAB win (new seat)
Angus East	Pauline Mary Hammond	4,978	11.4	3rd	CON win (new seat)
Ashford	Jo Hawkes	13,319	27.8	2nd	CON hold
Ashton-under-Lyne	John Adler	7,521	17.8	3rd	LAB hold
Aylesbury	Michael Alexander Soole	15,310	29.4	2nd	CON hold
Banbury	Keith Fitchett	13,200	26.9	2nd	CON hold
Banff and Buchan	Edward Allport Needham	6,084	15.0	3rd	CON win (new seat)
Barnsley West and Penistone	John Evans	9,624	21.7	3rd	LAB hold
Barrow and Furness	David Cottier	11,079	21.7	3rd	SDP split left-wing vote allowing CON gain from LAB
Basildon	Sue Slipman	11,634	25.7	3rd	CON hold, but SDP and LAB together outpolled them
Basingstoke	Ednyfed Hudson Davies (defecting Labour MP from Caerphilly)	15,931	28.8	2nd	CON hold
Bassetlaw	Brian Withnall	8,124	16.7	3rd	LAB hold
Bath	Malcolm Dean	17,240	36.0	2nd	CON hold, but SDP and LAB together outpolled them
Batley and Spen	Stephen Woollery	11,678	21.6	3rd	CON win (new seat), but SDP+LAB outpolled them
Battersea	M. Harris	7,675	17.5	3rd	LAB win (new seat)
South West Bedfordshire	Richard Byfield	16,036	27.8	2nd	
East Berkshire	Kevin Patrick O'Sullivan	17,868	29.9	2nd	
Birmingham Edgbaston	Joseph Christopher Binns	8,167	22.4	2nd	
Birmingham Erdington	Christopher Bernard Barber	7,915	21.1	3rd	
Birmingham Selly Oak	Kevin William Wheldall	10,613	20.7	3rd	
Birmingham Small Heath	Andrew Bostock	5,722	16.0	3rd	
Birmingham Sparkbrook	Omkar Singh Parmar	3,416	10.4	3rd	
Birmingham Yardley	David Anthony Bennett	8,109	23.1	3rd	
Blackburn	Eric Fairbrother	8,174	14.4	3rd	
Blackpool South	Alex G. Cox	9,417	24.0	3rd	
Blaydon	Maurice Carr	12,607	26.3	3rd	
Blyth Valley	Rosemary Margaret Brownlow	13,340	31.8	2nd	
Bolsover	S. Reddish	7,886	16.8	3rd	
Bolton North East	John Alcock	8,311	18.3	3rd	
Bradford North	Peter Birkby	11,962	25.5	3rd	
Bradford West	Edward Lyons (defecting Labour MP)	13,301	27.1	3rd	LAB hold (that is, reverted to 1979 status quo)
Caithness and Sutherland	Robert Maclennan (defecting Labour MP)	12,119	52.0	1st	SDP gain from LAB (held 1981 gain)
Cannock and Burntwood	Joseph Withnall	11,336	22.1	3rd	
Cardiff West	Jeffrey Thomas (defecting Labour MP from Abertillery)	10,388	25.5	3rd	SDP split left-wing vote allowing CON gain from LAB
Clwyd South West	Tom Ellis (defecting Labour MP from Wrexham)	13,024	30.2	2nd	CON win in new seat; SDP+LAB together outpolled them
Crosby	Shirley Williams (sitting SDP MP)	27,203	42.0	2nd	CON hold (that is, reverted to 1979 status quo)
Darlington	Ray Dutton	8,737	17.4	3rd	
Dewsbury	David Ginsburg (defecting Labour MP)	13,065	25.3	3rd	SDP split left-wing vote allowing CON gain from LAB
Erith and Crayford	James Wellbeloved (defecting Labour MP)	14,369	34.9	2nd	SDP split left-wing vote allowing CON gain from LAB
Glasgow Hillhead	Roy Jenkins (sitting SDP MP)	14,856	36.2	1st	SDP gain from CON (held 1982 by-election gain)
Hackney South and Shoreditch	Ronald Brown (defecting Labour MP)	7,025	18.3	3rd	LAB hold (that is, reverted to 1979 status quo)
Halifax	F. Cockroft	11,868	21.7	3rd	
Hayes and Harlington	Neville Sandelson (defecting Labour MP)	11,842	29.0	3rd	SDP split left-wing vote allowing CON gain from LAB
Hyndburn	John Bridgen	6,716	14.6	3rd	
Islington North	John Grant (defecting Labour MP from abolished Islington Central)	8,268	22.4	3rd	LAB hold (that is, reverted to 1979 status quo)
Islington South and Finsbury	George Cunningham (defecting Labour MP)	13,097	35.3	2nd	LAB hold (that is, reverted to 1979 status quo)
Leicester East	Tom Bradley (defecting Labour MP)	10,362	21.1	3rd	SDP split left-wing vote allowing CON gain from LAB
Lewisham East	Polly Toynbee	9,351	22.0	3rd	
Leyton	Bryan Magee (defecting Labour MP)	9,448	24.9	3rd	LAB hold (that is, reverted to 1979 status quo)
Liverpool Broadgreen	Richard Crawshaw (defecting Labour MP from abolished Liverpool Toxteth)	5,169	11.2	4th	LAB win in new seat
Liverpool West Derby	Eric Ogden (defecting Labour MP)	7,871	18.0	3rd	LAB hold (that is, reverted to 1979 status quo)
Meriden	Pamela Dunbar	10,674	20.1	3rd	
Newcastle Central	John Horam (defecting Labour MP from abolished Gateshead West)	9,923	22.3	3rd	SDP split left-wing vote allowing CON gain from LAB
Newcastle upon Tyne East	Mike Thomas (defecting Labour MP)	11,293	26.7	3rd	LAB hold (that is, reverted to 1979 status quo)
Newham North West	Alec Kellaway	5,204	18.6	3rd	
North West Norfolk	Christopher Brocklebank-Fowler (defecting Conservative MP)	20,211	37.6	2nd	CON hold, but SDP and LAB together outpolled them
Norwich South	Charles Hardie	11,968	24.5	3rd	
Plymouth Devonport	David Owen (defecting Labour MP)	20,843	44.3	1st	SDP gain from LAB (held 1981 gain)
Renfrew West and Inverclyde (replaced West Renfrewshire)	Dickson Mabon (defecting Labour MP from abolished Greenock & Port Glasgow)	12,347	29.5	2nd	SDP split left-wing vote allowing CON gain from LAB
Ross, Cromarty and Skye (replaced Ross and Cromarty)	Charles Kennedy	13,528	38.5	1st	SDP gain from CON
Slough	Nicholas Bosanquet	9,519	18.5	3rd	
Southampton Itchen	Bob Mitchell (defecting Labour MP)	16,647	31.5	2nd	SDP split left-wing vote allowing CON gain from LAB
Stockport	Thomas McNally (defecting Labour MP from abolished Stockport South)	12,129	27.6	3rd	SDP split left-wing vote allowing CON win in new seat
Stockton North (replaced Stockton-on-Tees)	William Rodgers (defecting Labour MP)	14,630	29.6	3rd	LAB hold (that is, reverted to 1979 status quo)
Stockton South (replaced Thornaby)	Ian Wrigglesworth (defecting Labour MP)	19,550	36.8	1st	SDP gain from LAB (held 1981 gain)
Woolwich (replaced Woolwich East)	John Cartwright (defecting Labour MP)	15,492	40.5	1st	SDP gain from LAB (held 1981 gain)
Worsley	John Roper (defecting Labour MP from Farnworth)	14,545	27.1	3rd	LAB win in new seat

=== Parliamentary by-elections, 1983–1987 ===
Through by-elections during the 1983–1987 UK Parliament, the SDP succeeded in electing 2 Social Democrat MPs.

== Local elections ==
The SDP participated in the 1982, 1983, 1984, 1985, 1986, 1987 local elections.

== European Parliament elections ==
Year	No. of Candidates	Total votes	% UK vote	No. of MEPs
1984		1,233,490	9.0	0
