= Angela Rumbold =

British politician

The Right Honourable Dame Angela Rumbold DBE
- Rumbold in 1997

Minister of State for Home Affairs
- In office 23 July 1990 – 14 April 1992
- Prime Minister: Margaret Thatcher; John Major
- Preceded by: David Mellor
- Succeeded by: Peter Lloyd

Minister of State for Education and Science
- In office 10 September 1986 – 24 July 1990
- Prime Minister: Margaret Thatcher
- Preceded by: Chris Patten
- Succeeded by: Tim Eggar

Parliamentary Under-Secretary of State for the Environment
- In office 2 September 1985 – 10 September 1986
- Prime Minister: Margaret Thatcher
- Preceded by: William Waldegrave
- Succeeded by: Christopher Chope

Member of Parliament for Mitcham and Morden
- In office 3 June 1982 – 8 April 1997
- Preceded by: Bruce Douglas-Mann
- Succeeded by: Siobhain McDonagh

Personal details
- Born: Angela Claire Rosemary Jones; 11 August 1932
- Died: 19 June 2010 (aged 77)
- Party: Conservative
- Spouse: John Rumbold (m. 1958)
- Children: 3
- Education: King's College London

Dame Angela Claire Rosemary Rumbold DBE PC (née Jones; 11 August 1932 – 19 June 2010) was a British Conservative politician who served as the Member of Parliament from a 1982 by-election until the 1997 general election.

== Education ==
She was educated at the Perse School for Girls, Cambridge, Notting Hill and Ealing High School and King's College London. She qualified as a barrister after earning her LLB, but never practised. She travelled across the United States with her father, a physicist who was Pro-Rector of the Imperial College until his death.

== Marriage and early career ==
She married John Marix Rumbold, a solicitor, in 1958, by whom she had two sons and a daughter and, as of November 2008, seven grandchildren.

She returned to a working life after raising her children and worked as the Chief Executive for a charity, The National Association for the Welfare of Children in Hospital. Following that post, as she had become a local councillor, she worked at the Greater London Council as a researcher, transferring across to work on the London desk at Conservative Central Office.

She served on many national committees including the Doctors' and Dentists' Review Body and was Chairman of the Teachers' Negotiating Committee until it was closed down by Act of Parliament.

== Politician ==
Rumbold served as a councillor in the Royal Borough of Kingston upon Thames between 1974 and 1983.

In 1982, Bruce Douglas-Mann, the MP for Mitcham and Morden, left the Labour Party to join the Social Democratic Party (SDP). He decided to resign as an MP and seek re-election under the SDP banner. The resulting by-election was held during the Falklands War and was won by Rumbold. She held the seat for the Conservatives in the landslide 1983 general election and for a further 14 years, usually with robust majorities.

Rumbold was known for her pro-nuclear views: she was a co-founder of Women For the Bomb and vice-chairwoman of the Women and Families for Defence.

Angela Rumbold served as Parliamentary Private Secretary to the Secretary of State for Transport, Under Secretary at the Department of Environment, Minister of State for Education and Minister of State at the Home Office. In 1992 she became the Deputy Chairman of the Conservative Party.

At the 1997 general election she lost her seat to Labour's Siobhain McDonagh on a swing of 11.6%, similar to the national average.

== School governor ==
After leaving the House of Commons in 1997 she returned to many of her voluntary activities. She was Chair of the Governing Body of both Danes Hill School in Oxshott and Surbiton High School in the Royal Borough of Kingston upon Thames, as well as Vice Chair of the Governing Body of Tolworth Girls' School, a large secondary modern school also in the Royal Borough of Kingston upon Thames.

She was Chair of Governors of Wimbledon High School and a Governor of More House Girls' School in Knightsbridge. She was Chair of the Court of Governors of Mill Hill School for nine years and set up its Pre-prep School Grimsdells. She also chaired the Minerva Fund for replacement of bursaries in Girls' Day School Trust schools after the closure of the Assisted Places Scheme.

She was co-chair of the Association of Governing Bodies of Independent Schools, and Chair of the Finance and General Purposes Committee of the Independent Schools Council. She was a member of the Trust and Governing Council of the United Church Schools Trust, and Chair of the United Learning Trust.

Parliament of the United Kingdom
Preceded by Bruce Douglas-Mann	Member of Parliament for Mitcham and Morden; 1982–1997	Succeeded by Siobhain McDonagh
