= Siobhain McDonagh =

British politician (born 1960)

Dame Siobhain McDonagh DBE MP
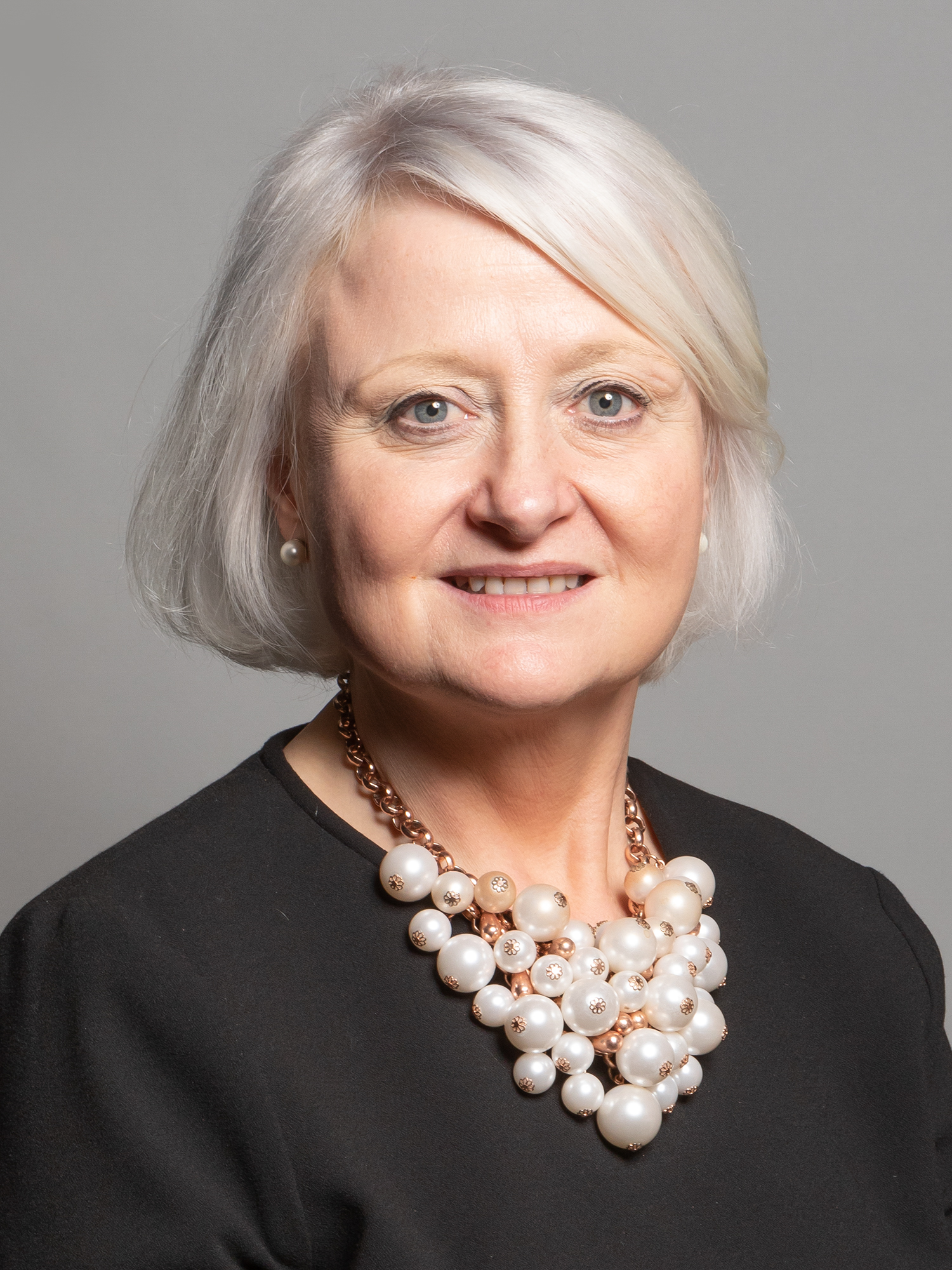
- Official portrait, 2020

Member of Parliament for Mitcham and Morden
- Incumbent
- Assumed office 1 May 1997
- Preceded by: Angela Rumbold
- Majority: 18,761 (41.4%)

Assistant Government Whip
- In office 28 June 2007 – 12 September 2008
- Prime Minister: Gordon Brown
- Succeeded by: Dawn Butler

Member of Merton Council for Colliers Wood
- In office 6 May 1982 – 7 May 1998

Personal details
- Born: 20 February 1960 (age 66) Colliers Wood, Surrey, England
- Party: Labour
- Relations: Margaret McDonagh (sister)
- Education: University of Essex (BA)
- Website: siobhainmcdonagh.org.uk

Dame Siobhain Ann McDonagh DBE (born 20 February 1960) is a British Labour Party politician who has been the Member of Parliament (MP) for Mitcham and Morden since 1997. She served as an Assistant Whip in the Labour Government, but was dismissed following comments regarding a leadership contest to replace prime minister Gordon Brown.

== Early life and career ==
Siobhain McDonagh was born on 20 February 1960 in Colliers Wood. Her father was a builder and her mother a nurse who moved to the area in 1958. She went to Holy Cross School, New Malden and later studied Politics at the University of Essex.

After graduating, McDonagh was a clerical officer for the DHSS between 1981 and 1983, a receptionist at the Wandsworth Homeless Persons Unit from 1984 to 1986, and a housing adviser from 1986 to 1988. Prior to being elected to Parliament she worked as a Development Manager for Battersea Churches Housing Trust from 1988 to 1997. She also served as a councillor on London Borough of Merton for Colliers Wood ward between 1982 and 1998, chairing the Housing Committee between 1990 and 1995, being instrumental in the rebuilding of Phipps Bridge Estate.

== Parliamentary career ==
At the 1997 general election, McDonagh was elected to Parliament as MP for Mitcham and Morden with 58.4% of the vote and a majority of 13,741.

In 1999, McDonagh introduced the House of Commons Disqualification (Amendment) Bill in Parliament, which sought to lift the restrictions on ordained people standing for Parliament. The bill was unsuccessful, although the government passed the House of Commons (Removal of Clergy Disqualification) Act 2001, making broadly the same provisions, two years later.

In April 2000, her office sent a party political questionnaire to 200 of her constituents using parliamentary resources. A spokesman for McDonagh subsequently said it was a "mistake". McDonagh promised to apologise and reimburse the cost to her office.

She was again re-elected as MP for Mitcham and Morden at the 2001 general election with an increased vote share of 60.4% and an increased majority of 13,785. After the 2001 general election, Tony Blair offered McDonagh the position of Parliamentary Undersecretary of State at the Department for Communities and Local Government. She declined the offer and remained a backbencher.

In March 2003, McDonagh voted in favour of the country going to war with Iraq. She has consistently voted against any inquiry into the Iraq War.

McDonagh was again re-elected at the 2005 general election, with a decreased vote share of 56.4% and a decreased majority of 12,560. Following the 2005 general election, she served as Parliamentary Private Secretary to John Reid until June 2007. She was appointed to the position of Assistant Whip in June 2007 in the re-shuffle brought about by Gordon Brown becoming prime minister.

In October 2007, her expenditure on stationery and postage attracted criticism, being more than any other MP's for postage from 2003 to 2006. In total, her office spent £126,833 on postage in the four-year period, an average of almost £32,000 per year. When adding in stationery costs, the expenditure was approximately £50,000 in both 2004–05 and 2006–07. McDonagh responded stating, "I believe the job of an MP is to keep in contact with constituents on important issues".

On 12 September 2008, McDonagh became the first member of the government to call for a leadership contest, resulting in dismissal from her government post.

McDonagh was again re-elected at the 2010 general election, with an increased vote share of 56.5% and an increased majority of 13,666.

In October 2010, McDonagh's mobile phone was stolen from her car. Although not implicated in the robbery itself, it became evident that The Sun newspaper had accessed the phone, including messages stored on it. McDonagh sued the paper and in March 2013 won "substantial damages."

At the 2015 general election, McDonagh was again re-elected with an increased vote share of 60.7% and an increased majority of 16,922.

In June 2015, McDonagh nominated Liz Kendall, considered the Blairite candidate, for leadership of the Labour Party.

In December 2015, she was among the minority of Labour MPs who voted in favour of extending UK military airstrikes against ISIL into Syria. She has written that it was a decision "not easy to come to".

She supported Owen Smith in the failed attempt to replace Jeremy Corbyn in the 2016 Labour leadership election.

McDonagh abstained from a vote on a motion withdrawing the UK's support for Saudi Arabia's military campaign in Yemen. The motion was defeated by a majority of 90.

At the snap 2017 general election, McDonagh was again re-elected with an increased vote share of 68.7% and an increased majority of 21,375.

In September 2018, McDonagh offered her support to Labour MP Chris Leslie when he faced a confidence motion from his CLP, a vote he subsequently lost.

In March 2019, McDonagh was criticised by some left-wing members of the party after she appeared to agree with a statement put forward by John Humphrys on BBC Radio 4's Today programme. McDonagh said antisemitism is a problem in the Labour Party, because "part of [Labour] politics, of hard left politics, [is] to be against capitalists and to see Jewish people as the financiers of capital". When Humphrys asked her if that meant that "to be anti-capitalist you have to be antisemitic", McDonagh replied, "Yes".

McDonagh was again re-elected at the 2019 general election, with a decreased vote share of 61.1% and a decreased majority of 16,482.

McDonagh endorsed Jess Phillips in the 2020 Labour Party leadership election.

In October 2020, during the Covid Pandemic, McDonagh faced criticism after being filmed inside the House of Commons, for using her face mask to clean her glasses.

McDonagh is a member of Labour Friends of Israel.

At the 2024 general election, McDonagh was again re-elected, with a decreased vote share of 55.4% and an increased majority of 18,761.

In November 2024, McDonagh voted against the Terminally Ill Adults (End of Life) Bill, a Bill to allow adults who are terminally ill, subject to safeguards and protections, to request and be provided with assistance to end their own life; and for connected purposes.

== Personal life ==
McDonagh lived in Colliers Wood in her constituency with her late sister Margaret, latterly Baroness McDonagh (1961 - 2023), who was General Secretary of the Labour Party between 1998 and 2001, during Tony Blair's premiership. She is a Roman Catholic of Irish descent.

In March 2023 McDonagh took a £1.2 million interest-free loan from Labour donor Lord Alli, to buy a house in south-west London with downstairs bedroom and bathroom suited for her terminally ill sister.

She was a patron of Leap Forward Employment – a now defunct community interest company that found work for adults with mental health issues.

McDonagh was appointed Dame Commander of the Order of the British Empire (DBE) in the 2024 New Year Honours for parliamentary and political service.

Parliament of the United Kingdom
| Preceded by Angela Rumbold | Member of Parliament for Mitcham and Morden; 1997–present | Incumbent |
