= 1935 Liverpool West Toxteth by-election =

UK Parliamentary by-election

The 1935 Liverpool West Toxteth by-election was held on 16 July 1935. The by-election was held due to the appointment as a metropolitan police magistrate of the incumbent Conservative MP, Clyde Tabor Wilson. It was won by the Labour candidate Joseph Gibbins, who had previously won the 1924 by-election in the same seat and held it until the 1931 general election.

== Result ==
Liverpool West Toxteth by-election, 1935
Party	Candidate	Votes	%	±%
Labour	Joseph Gibbins	14,908	60.9	+18.8
Conservative	J.W.J. Cremlyn	9,565	39.1	−18.8
Majority		5,343	21.8	N/A
Turnout		24,473	53.9	−22.2
Registered electors		45,373		
Labour gain from Conservative		Swing	+18.8	
