= 1924 Liverpool West Toxteth by-election =

UK Parliamentary by-election

The 1924 Liverpool West Toxteth by-election was held on 22 May 1924. The by-election was held due to the resignation of the incumbent Conservative MP, Robert Houston. It was won by the Labour candidate Joseph Gibbins. This was the first time a Labour candidate had won the seat.

== Background ==
Although the West Toxteth constituency had been held by the Conservatives with a majority of 4,821 votes at the 1922 general election, the party's majority had been reduced to just 139 votes in the 1923 election. On both those occasions Gibbins had been Labour's unsuccessful candidate.

== Result ==
1924 Liverpool West Toxteth by-election
| Party | Candidate | Votes | % | ±% |
|---|---|---|---|---|
| Labour | Joseph Gibbins | 15,505 | 54.3 | +4.6 |
| Unionist | Thomas White | 13,034 | 45.7 | −4.6 |
| Majority | | 2,471 | 8.6 | N/A |
| Turnout | | 28,539 | 76.2 | +10.1 |
| Labour gain from Unionist | | Swing | +4.6 | |

== Aftermath ==
Although nationally the Conservatives won a landslide victory at the general election a few months later, in West Toxteth Gibbins managed to again defeat White, albeit with a much reduced majority of 379 votes. The Conservatives would not regain the seat until the National Government's landslide victory in 1931, when Gibbins was heavily defeated. However he would recapture the seat at another by-election in 1935.
