= Sir Robert Houston, 1st Baronet =

British politician

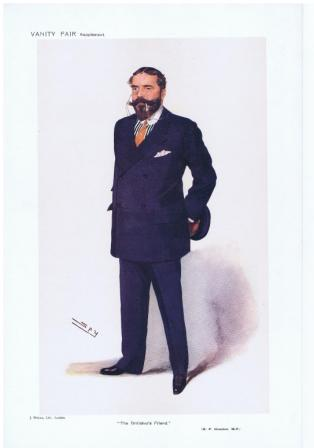
Caricature of Robert Houston by "Spy" in Vanity Fair, 14 June 1911

Sir Robert Paterson Houston, 1st Baronet (31 May 1853 – 14 April 1926) was a British Conservative Party politician and shipowner.

He was born to a maritime engineer from Renfrewshire, and, after an apprenticeship in Liverpool, Houston also became an engineer. In 1877 he bought a share in a packet steamer with his inheritance, using the profits to start up his own management company in 1880, R.P. Houston & Company. Clan Line acquired R.P. Houston & Company in 1918.

He was the principal shareholder in the "New Brighton Tower and Gardens Company Limited" (registered 21 July 1896), which built the New Brighton Tower (opened June 1898).

In 1892 he was elected as member of parliament (MP) for Liverpool West Toxteth, resigning on 26 April 1924 through appointment as Steward of the Chiltern Hundreds. He was created a Baronet, of West Toxteth in the City of Liverpool, in 1922.

In 1924 he married Lucy, Lady Byron, widow of the 9th baron, who then became Lady Houston. Research published in 2020 outlined her seven-year pursuit of him. In his will, he left his wife the bulk of his fortune. When he died on his steam yacht Liberty on 14 April 1926, she became the second richest woman in England.

Using Houston's money his widow funded the first flight over Mount Everest and the development of the later-to-be-famous Supermarine Spitfire aircraft. She then purchased a weekly journal, the Saturday Review, in which she pursued a fascist agenda.

Parliament of the United Kingdom
Preceded by Thomas Royden	Member of Parliament for Liverpool West Toxteth; 1892–1924	Succeeded by Joseph Gibbins
Baronetage of the United Kingdom
New creation	Baronet (of West Toxteth); 1922–1926	Extinct
