= Joseph Gibbins =

British trade unionist and Labour Party politician

Joseph Gibbins, JP (1888 – 26 August 1965) was a British trade unionist and Labour Party politician.

== Early life ==
Joseph Gibbins was born in the Toxteth Park district of Liverpool in early 1888. He was educated at evening classes at Liverpool University. Gibbins married Sarah Beatrice Hugill at Princes Park Methodist Church, Liverpool in 1912, and they had two sons and two daughters.

He served with the RNR during the First World War, and afterwards became Secretary of the Liverpool Boilermakers' Union.

== Political records ==
Gibbins unsuccessfully contested the West Toxteth division of Liverpool for Labour in the general elections of 1922 and 1923, losing by only 139 votes on the latter occasion.

Shortly after the 1923 election, the Labour party formed its first government, taking office on 22 January 1924.

In April 1924, the long-serving but low-profile Unionist Member of Parliament (MP) for West Toxteth, Sir Robert Paterson Houston, Bt. retired. Joseph Gibbins was once again selected to fight the seat for Labour. He was 36 years old.

Liverpool was a notoriously sectarian city, divided along Protestant and Catholic lines. The Conservative city-boss, Alderman the Rt Hon. Sir Archibald Salvidge had built a career in stoking these divisions. As early as 1907, at the count for the Liverpool Kirkdale by-election, Ramsay MacDonald had remarked to him bitterly

It is astonishing how in Liverpool, whatever the issue appears to be at the start, you always manage to mobilise the full force of Orangeism. We will never do any good here until that power is broken...

And so it was in West Toxteth in 1924. To Salvidge and his candidate, Thomas White, the issue was religion and specifically, denouncement of any attempt to adjust the boundaries of the newly created Northern Ireland. The Boundary Commission (Ireland) was then in the early stage of its report.

The by-election was notable in that it saw Winston Churchill's first speech to a Conservative meeting in over 20 years, when he addressed the Liverpool Conservative Workingman's Association on 7 May 1924.

The Liberals did not put forward a candidate and advised their supporters to vote Labour.

On 22 May 1924 Joseph Gibbins, a non-sectarian Protestant, triumphed for Labour, with a majority of 2,471 over the Conservative. The result was exceptional, as it remains the only occasion that a Labour government has gained a seat from the Opposition in an electoral contest.^{1}

Gibbins held the seat by 379 votes in the 1924 general election, and comfortably in the 1929 general election, but was defeated by the Conservative Clyde Tabor Wilson in the landslide defeat of 1931. He had also become a Justice of the Peace in Liverpool in 1924.

However, West Toxteth and Joseph Gibbins were not yet finished with each other. In early 1935, Wilson resigned to take up a position as Metropolitan Police Magistrate. Joseph Gibbins was again selected as by-election candidate, and on Tuesday 16 July 1935 he easily regained the seat on a swing of 19%. Gibbins thus went into the record books for a second time, as the only person to gain the same seat twice in two different by-elections.

Joseph Gibbins easily held the seat in the 1935 general election -against Randolph Churchill- and in the 1945 general election. However, boundary changes merged the seat into a new Toxteth constituency for the 1950 general election. Gibbins gamely contested the new seat, but lost by 2,620 votes to the Conservative Reginald Bevins. He had fought 10 parliamentary elections, a record for the City of Liverpool.

He died in 1965, aged 77.

== Notes ==
^{1} During the second Labour government in 1929 two seats, Preston and Liverpool Scotland, were gained by Labour without contest.

== See also ==
- UK by-election records

Parliament of the United Kingdom
| Preceded by Robert Houston | Member of Parliament for Liverpool West Toxteth; May 1924 – 1931 | Succeeded by Clyde Wilson |
| Preceded by Clyde Wilson | Member of Parliament for Liverpool West Toxteth; July 1935 – 1950 | Constituency abolished |
