= Mitcham and Morden =

UK Parliament constituency (since 1974)

Coordinates: 51.401°N 0.176°W

- Borough constituency for the House of Commons
- Interactive map of boundaries from 2024
- Location in Greater London
- County: Greater London
- Electorate: 76,877 (March 2020)
- Major settlements: Colliers Wood, Mitcham, Morden and Merton

Current constituency
- Created: 1974
- Member of Parliament: Siobhain McDonagh (Labour)
- Seats: One
- Created from: Mitcham; Merton & Morden

Mitcham and Morden is a constituency (Note: A borough constituency (for the purposes of election expenses and type of returning officer)) in Greater London represented in the House of Commons of the UK Parliament since 1997 by Dame Siobhain McDonagh of the Labour Party. (Note: As with all constituencies, the constituency elects one Member of Parliament (MP) by the first past the post system of election at least every five years.)

== Constituency profile ==
Mitcham and Morden is a constituency in the Borough of Merton in Greater London, located around 8 miles (13 km) south of the centre of London. It covers the neighbourhoods of Mitcham, Lower Morden, Pollards Hill, Colliers Wood and part of central Morden.

This is a relatively dense suburban constituency that was mostly developed in the interwar period and consists mainly of terraced houses and low-rise flats. Mitcham retains some village-like characteristics with many green spaces including the large Mitcham Common, although there is some deprivation here with council housing developments and industrial estates. Mitcham contains two train stations and is connected to the Tramlink network, although only Morden is served by the London Underground. Lower Morden is the most affluent area of the constituency with many large semi-detached properties. House prices across the constituency are generally lower than the rest of London but higher than the national average.

Mitcham and Morden has a large working-age population and relatively few retirees. In general, residents have average levels of education and homeownership. Levels of household income and child poverty are similar to the rest of London. A high proportion of residents work in the retail, education and construction sectors, and the percentage of residents claiming unemployment benefits is high.

White people made up 52% of the population at the 2021 census. Around one-third of the White population are of non-British origin, including large Polish and South African communities. Asians were the largest ethnic minority group at 21%, many of whom were of Sri Lankan origin. Black people were 16% of the population, mostly concentrated in Pollards Hill where they made up around one-third of residents.

At the local borough council, almost all seats in the constituency are represented by the Labour Party, although some Liberal Democrats were elected in Cannon Hill. An estimated 54% of voters in Mitcham and Morden supported remaining in the European Union in the 2016 referendum, a lower percentage than the rest of London but higher than the UK-wide figure of 48%.

== History ==
The constituency was created in 1974 from the former seats of Mitcham and Merton & Morden.

Between 1974 and 1982 it was represented by Bruce Douglas-Mann who was elected as a Labour MP but defected in 1982 to the Social Democratic Party (SDP). Douglas-Mann was the sole SDP defector to resign his seat; he sought immediate re-election.

In the by-election Douglas-Mann triggered in May 1982, during the Falklands War, Angela Rumbold (Con) was elected. Rumbold's gain was the last time the Conservative Party would gain (as opposed to hold) at a by-election until 22 May 2008 when Edward Timpson won the Crewe and Nantwich by-election.

At the 1997 general election the seat was won by the Labour Party's Siobhain McDonagh. At the 2001, 2005 and 2010 General Elections, she was re-elected, in the latter election polling the 26th highest share of the vote for the party of the 631 seats contested.

The 2015 re-election of McDonagh made the seat the 41st safest of Labour's 232 seats by percentage of majority and 14th safest in the capital. The seat is one of the capital's two seats in which its majority in 2015 surpassed the Labour Party's landslide 1997 victory (the other being Ilford South).

== Boundaries ==
Map of boundaries 2010-2024

=== Historic ===
1974–1983: The London Borough of Merton wards of Mitcham Central, Mitcham East, Mitcham North, Mitcham South, Mitcham West, Morden, and Ravensbury.

1983–2010: Upon redrawing of most of the local government wards, the London Borough of Merton wards of Colliers Wood, Figge's Marsh, Graveney, Lavender, Longthornton, Lower Morden, Phipps Bridge, Pollards Hill, Ravensbury, and St Helier.

2010–2024: As above except Cricket Green ward replaced Phipps Bridge and Lavender ward was renamed Lavender Fields following a local authority boundary review.

=== Current ===
Further to the 2023 review of Westminster constituencies, which came into effect for the 2024 general election, the constituency was expanded to include the Cannon Hill ward, transferred from Wimbledon.

Following this change, as well as reflecting the 2022 local government review, the constituency now comprises the following:

- The London Borough of Merton wards of: Cannon Hill, Colliers Wood, Cricket Green, Figge's Marsh, Graveney, Lavender Fields, Longthornton, Lower Morden, Merton Park, Pollards Hill, Ravensbury, and St Helier.

== Members of Parliament ==
Election	Member	Party
February 1974	Bruce Douglas-Mann	Labour
1981	Bruce Douglas-Mann	SDP
1982 by-election	Angela Rumbold	Conservative
1997	Siobhain McDonagh	Labour

== Election results ==
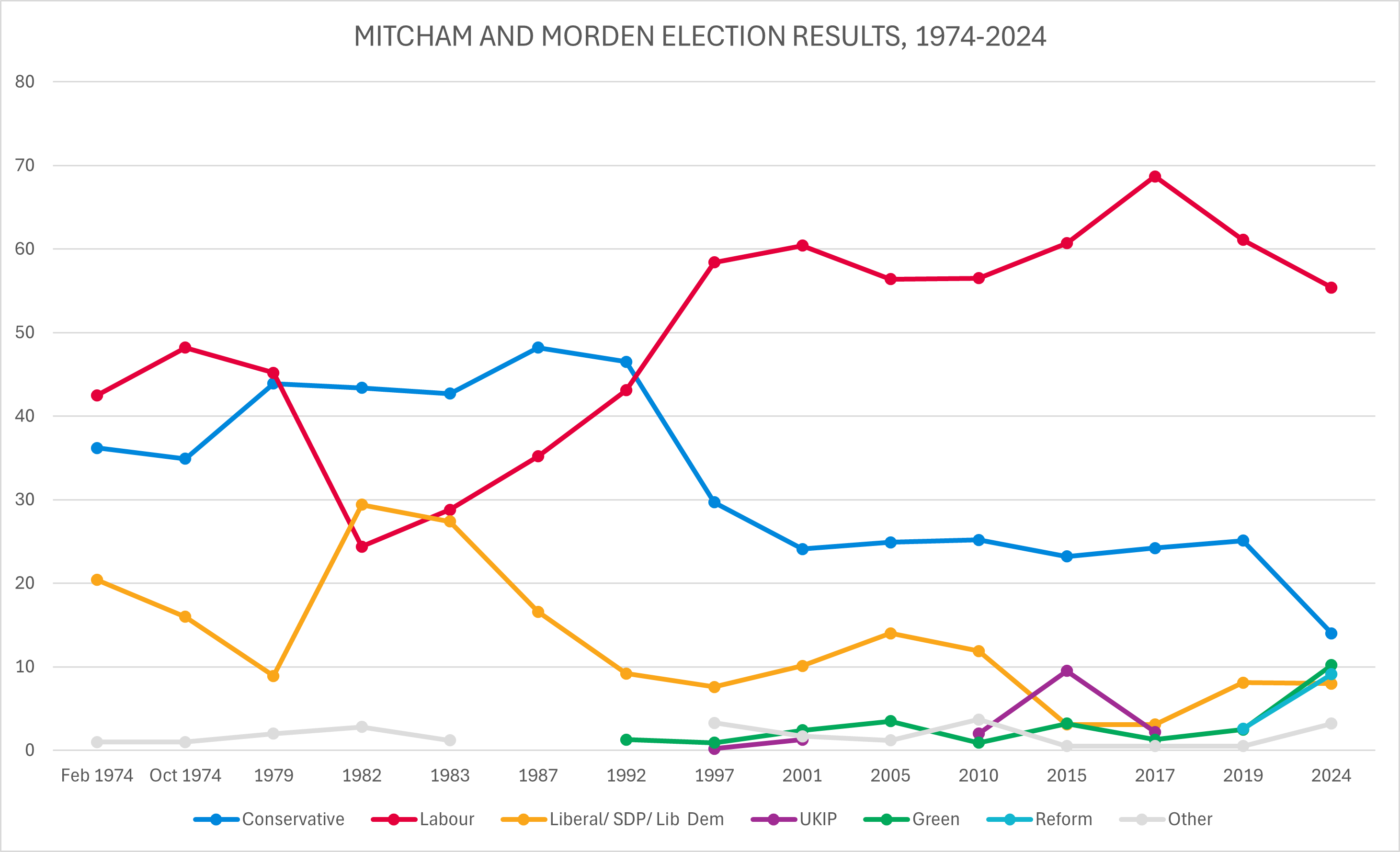
Election results 1974-2024

=== Elections in the 2020s ===
General election 2024: Mitcham and Morden
Party	Candidate	Votes	%	±%
Labour	Siobhain McDonagh	25,085	55.4	−2.1
Conservative	Ellie Cox	6,324	14.0	−12.7
Green	Pippa Maslin	4,635	10.2	+8.0
Reform	Ruth Price	4,135	9.1	+6.8
Liberal Democrats	Jenifer Gould	3,622	8.0	−2.8
Workers Party	Mehmood Jamshed	1,091	2.4	N/A
CPA	Des Coke	363	0.8	+0.4
Majority		18,761	41.4	+10.6
Turnout		45,255	58.6	–8.6
Registered electors		77,272		
Labour hold		Swing	▲5.3	

=== Elections in the 2010s ===
2019 notional result
Party	Vote	%
Labour	29,671	57.5
Conservative	13,792	26.7
Liberal Democrats	5,592	10.8
Brexit Party	1,202	2.3
Green	1,160	2.2
Others	216	0.4
Turnout	51,633	67.2
Electorate	76,877	

General election 2019: Mitcham and Morden
Party	Candidate	Votes	%	±%
Labour	Siobhain McDonagh	27,964	61.1	−7.6
Conservative	Toby Williams	11,482	25.1	+0.9
Liberal Democrats	Luke Taylor	3,717	8.1	+5.0
Brexit Party	Jeremy Maddocks	1,202	2.6	New
Green	Pippa Maslin	1,160	2.5	+1.2
CPA	Des Coke	216	0.5	0.0
Majority		16,482	36.0	−8.5
Turnout		45,741	65.3	−4.7
Registered electors		68,705		
Labour hold		Swing	-4.2	

General election 2017: Mitcham and Morden
Party	Candidate	Votes	%	±%
Labour	Siobhain McDonagh	33,039	68.7	+8.0
Conservative	Alicia Kearns	11,664	24.2	+1.0
Liberal Democrats	Claire Mathys	1,494	3.1	0.0
UKIP	Richard Hilton	1,054	2.2	−7.3
Green	Laura Collins	644	1.3	−1.9
CPA	Des Coke	223	0.5	0.0
Majority		21,375	44.5	+7.0
Turnout		48,118	70.0	+4.1
Registered electors		68,705		
Labour hold		Swing	+3.45	

General election 2015: Mitcham and Morden
Party	Candidate	Votes	%	±%
Labour	Siobhain McDonagh	27,380	60.7	+4.2
Conservative	Paul Holmes	10,458	23.2	−2.0
UKIP	Richard Hilton	4,287	9.5	+7.5
Green	Mason Redding	1,422	3.2	+2.3
Liberal Democrats	Diana Coman	1,378	3.1	−8.8
CPA	Des Coke	217	0.5	New
Majority		16,922	37.5	+6.2
Turnout		45,142	65.9	−1.1
Registered electors		68,474		
Labour hold		Swing	+3.1	

General election 2010: Mitcham and Morden
Party	Candidate	Votes	%	±%
Labour	Siobhain McDonagh	24,722	56.4	–0.3
Conservative	Melanie Hampton	11,056	25.2	+0.5
Liberal Democrats	Diana Coman	5,202	11.9	−1.9
BNP	Tony Martin	1,386	3.2	New
UKIP	Andrew Mills	857	2.0	New
Green	Smarajit Roy	381	0.9	−2.6
Independent	Rathy Alagaratnam	155	0.4	–0.1
Independent	Ernest Redgrave	38	0.1	New
Majority		13,666	31.3	–0.9
Turnout		43,797	66.4	+5.2
Registered electors		65,939		
Labour hold		Swing	−0.4	

=== Elections in the 2000s ===
2005 notional result
Party	Vote	%
Labour	22,562	55.8
Conservative	9,820	24.7
Liberal Democrats	5,479	13.8
Others	1,885	4.7
Turnout	39,746	61.2
Electorate	64,914	

General election 2005: Mitcham and Morden
Party	Candidate	Votes	%	±%
Labour	Siobhain McDonagh	22,489	56.4	−4.0
Conservative	Andrew Shellhorn	9,929	24.9	+0.8
Liberal Democrats	Jo A.E. Christie-Smith	5,583	14.0	+3.9
Green	Thomas Walsh	1,395	3.5	+1.1
Veritas	Adrian Roberts	286	0.7	New
Independent	Rathy Alagaratnam	186	0.5	New
Majority		12,560	31.5	–5.8
Turnout		39,868	61.2	+3.4
Registered electors		65,148		
Labour hold		Swing	−2.4	

General election 2001: Mitcham and Morden
Party	Candidate	Votes	%	±%
Labour	Siobhain McDonagh	22,936	60.4	+2.0
Conservative	Henry Stokes	9,151	24.1	−5.6
Liberal Democrats	Nicholas Harris	3,820	10.1	+2.5
Green	Thomas Walsh	926	2.4	+1.5
BNP	John Tyndall	642	1.7	+0.6
UKIP	Adrian Roberts	486	1.3	+1.1
Majority		13,785	36.3	+7.6
Turnout		37,961	57.8	−15.5
Registered electors		65,671		
Labour hold		Swing	+3.8	

=== Elections in the 1990s ===
General election 1997: Mitcham and Morden
Party	Candidate	Votes	%	±%
Labour	Siobhain McDonagh	27,984	58.4	+15.9
Conservative	Angela Rumbold	14,243	29.7	−16.8
Liberal Democrats	Nicholas Harris	3,632	7.6	−1.6
Referendum	Peter J. Isaacs	810	1.7	New
BNP	Linda Miller	521	1.1	New
Green	Thomas Walsh	415	0.9	−0.4
Independent	Krishnapillai Vasan	144	0.3	New
UKIP	John R. Barrett	117	0.2	New
Anti-Corruption	Nigel T.V. Dixon	80	0.2	New
Majority		13,741	28.7	N/A
Turnout		47,946	73.3	−7.0
Registered electors		65,402		
Labour gain from Conservative		Swing	–16.0	

General election 1992: Mitcham and Morden
Party	Candidate	Votes	%	±%
Conservative	Angela Rumbold	23,789	46.5	−1.7
Labour	Siobhain McDonagh	22,055	43.1	+7.9
Liberal Democrats	John C. Field	4,687	9.2	−7.6
Green	Thomas J. Walsh	655	1.3	New
Majority		1,734	3.4	−9.6
Turnout		51,186	80.3	+4.6
Registered electors		63,273		
Conservative hold		Swing	−4.8	

=== Elections in the 1980s ===
General election 1987: Mitcham and Morden
Party	Candidate	Votes	%	±%
Conservative	Angela Rumbold	23,002	48.2	+5.5
Labour	Siobhain McDonagh	16,819	35.2	+6.4
SDP	Bruce Douglas-Mann	7,930	16.6	−10.8
Majority		6,183	12.9	–0.9
Turnout		47,751	75.7	+2.6
Registered electors		63,089		
Conservative hold		Swing	−0.5	

General election 1983: Mitcham and Morden
Party	Candidate	Votes	%	±%
Conservative	Angela Rumbold	19,827	42.7	−1.2
Labour	David Nicholas	13,376	28.8	−16.4
SDP	Bruce Douglas-Mann	12,720	27.4	+18.5
National Front	J.R. Perryman	539	1.2	−0.9
Majority		6,451	13.9	N/A
Turnout		46,462	73.1	–3.7
Registered electors		63,535		
Conservative hold		Swing	+7.6	

1982 Mitcham and Morden by-election
Party	Candidate	Votes	%	±%
Conservative	Angela Rumbold	13,306	43.4	−0.5
SDP	Bruce Douglas-Mann	9,032	29.4	+20.6
Labour	David Nicholas	7,475	24.4	−20.8
National Front	Joseph Pearce	547	1.8	−0.2
Independent Liberal	Edward Larkin	123	0.4	New
Ethnic Minority Candidate	Roy Sawh	84	0.3	New
Democratic Monarchist	Bill Boaks	66	0.2	New
COPS	Jitendra Bardwaj	22	0.1	New
Computer Democrat	Christopher Farnsworth	18	0.0	New
Majority		4,274	13.9	N/A
Turnout		30,673	48.5	–28.4
Registered electors		63,259		
Conservative gain from Labour		Swing	+10.2	

=== Elections in the 1970s ===
General election 1979: Merton, Mitcham and Morden
Party	Candidate	Votes	%	±%
Labour	Bruce Douglas-Mann	21,668	45.2	−3.0
Conservative	David Samuel	21,050	43.9	+9.0
Liberal	Ronald Locke	4,258	8.9	−7.1
National Front	John Perryman	966	2.0	New
Majority		618	1.3	−12.0
Turnout		47,942	76.9	+5.9
Registered electors		62,365		
Labour hold		Swing	−6.0	

General election October 1974: Merton, Mitcham and Morden
Party	Candidate	Votes	%	±%
Labour	Bruce Douglas-Mann	22,384	48.2	+5.7
Conservative	D. Samuel	16,193	34.9	−1.3
Liberal	M. Simpson	7,429	16.0	−4.4
Communist	Sid French	281	0.6	−0.4
Independent	G. Giddins	106	0.2	New
Air Road Public Safety White Resident	Bill Boaks	68	0.2	New
Majority		6,191	13.3	+7.0
Turnout		46,461	71.0	−8.0
Registered electors		65,398		
Labour hold		Swing	+3.5	

General election February 1974: Merton, Mitcham and Morden
Party	Candidate	Votes	%	±%
Labour	Bruce Douglas-Mann	21,771	42.5	–8.4
Conservative	David Harris	18,546	36.2	–11.7
Liberal	Peter Spratling	10,462	20.4	New
Communist	Sid French	507	1.0	New
Majority		3,225	6.3	+3.3
Turnout		51,286	79.0	+9.0
Registered electors		64,894		
Labour hold		Swing	+1.6	

1970 notional result
Party	Vote	%
Labour	23,600	50.9
Conservative	22,200	47.8
Others	600	1.3
Turnout	46,400	70.0
Electorate	66,271	

== See also ==
- parliamentary constituencies in London
