= Liverpool West Toxteth =

Parliamentary constituency in the United Kingdom, 1885–1950

- Former borough constituency for the House of Commons

1885–1950
- Seats: one
- Created from: Liverpool
- Replaced by: Liverpool Toxteth and Liverpool Exchange

Liverpool West Toxteth was a parliamentary constituency represented in the House of Commons of the Parliament of the United Kingdom. It elected one Member of Parliament (MP) by the first past the post system of election.

== Boundaries ==
1885–1918: Part of the civil parish of Toxteth.

1918–1950: The County Borough of Liverpool wards of Brunswick, Dingle, and Prince's Park.

== Members of Parliament ==
Year	Member	Party
1885	Thomas Royden	Conservative
1892	Robert Houston	Conservative
1924	Joseph Gibbins	Labour
1931	Clyde Wilson	Conservative
1935	Joseph Gibbins	Labour
1950	constituency abolished	

== Election results ==
=== Elections in the 1880s ===
General election 1885: Liverpool West Toxteth
Party	Candidate	Votes	%	±%
Conservative	Thomas Royden	3,754	67.9	
Liberal	Thomas Sutherst	1,771	32.1	
Majority		1,983	35.8	
Turnout		5,525	71.9	
Registered electors		7,684		
Conservative win (new seat)				

General election 1886: West Toxteth
Party	Candidate	Votes	%	±%
Conservative	Thomas Royden	Unopposed		
Conservative hold				

=== Elections in the 1890s ===
Ellis Griffith

General election 1892: West Toxteth
Party	Candidate	Votes	%	±%
Conservative	Robert Houston	3,604	59.2	N/A
Liberal	Ellis Griffith	2,479	40.8	New
Majority		1,125	18.4	N/A
Turnout		6,083	74.9	N/A
Registered electors		8,118		
Conservative hold		Swing	N/A	

General election 1895: West Toxteth
Party	Candidate	Votes	%	±%
Conservative	Robert Houston	3,610	68.6	+9.4
Liberal	William Mulholland	1,653	31.4	−9.4
Majority		1,957	37.2	+18.8
Turnout		5,263	65.2	−9.7
Registered electors		8,067		
Conservative hold		Swing	+9.4	

=== Elections in the 1900s ===
General election 1900: West Toxteth
Party	Candidate	Votes	%	±%
Conservative	Robert Houston	Unopposed		
Conservative hold				

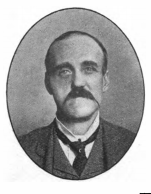
Sexton

General election 1906: West Toxteth
Party	Candidate	Votes	%	±%
Conservative	Robert Houston	3,373	56.5	N/A
Labour Repr. Cmte.	James Sexton	2,592	43.5	New
Majority		781	13.0	N/A
Turnout		5,965	71.5	N/A
Registered electors		8,347		
Conservative hold		Swing	N/A	

=== Elections in the 1910s ===
General election January 1910: West Toxteth
Party	Candidate	Votes	%	±%
Conservative	Robert Houston	3,928	57.5	+1.0
Labour	James Sexton	2,909	42.5	−1.0
Majority		1,019	15.0	+2.0
Turnout		6,837	75.8	+4.3
Conservative hold		Swing	+1.0	

General election December 1910: West Toxteth
Party	Candidate	Votes	%	±%
Conservative	Robert Houston	3,936	61.7	+4.2
Liberal	Thomas Molony	2,445	38.3	New
Majority		1,491	23.4	+8.4
Turnout		6,381	70.8	−5.0
Conservative hold		Swing		

General Election 1914–15:

Another General Election was required to take place before the end of 1915. The political parties had been making preparations for an election to take place and by July 1914, the following candidates had been selected;

- Unionist: Robert Houston
- Liberal:

General election 1918: Liverpool West Toxteth
Party		Candidate	Votes	%	±%
C	Unionist	Robert Houston	13,083	65.6	+3.9
	Labour	William Robinson	6,850	34.4	New
Majority			6,233	31.2	+7.8
Turnout			19,933	55.7	−15.1
	Unionist hold		Swing		
C indicates candidate endorsed by the coalition government.

=== Elections in the 1920s ===
General election 1922: Liverpool West Toxteth
Party	Candidate	Votes	%	±%
Unionist	Robert Houston	15,030	59.6	−6.0
Labour	Joseph Gibbins	10,209	40.4	+6.0
Majority		4,821	19.2	−12.0
Turnout		25,239	69.1	+13.4
Unionist hold		Swing	+6.0	

General election 1923: Liverpool West Toxteth
Party	Candidate	Votes	%	±%
Unionist	Robert Houston	12,457	50.3	−9.3
Labour	Joseph Gibbins	12,318	49.7	+9.3
Majority		139	0.6	−18.6
Turnout		24,775	66.1	−3.0
Unionist hold		Swing	-9.3	

1924 Liverpool West Toxteth by-election
Party	Candidate	Votes	%	±%
Labour	Joseph Gibbins	15,505	54.3	+4.6
Unionist	Thomas White	13,034	45.7	−4.6
Majority		2,471	8.6	N/A
Turnout		28,539	76.2	+10.1
Labour gain from Unionist		Swing	+4.6	

General election 1924: Liverpool West Toxteth
Party	Candidate	Votes	%	±%
Labour	Joseph Gibbins	15,542	50.6	−3.7
Unionist	Thomas White	15,163	49.4	+3.7
Majority		379	1.2	−7.4
Turnout		30,705	79.7	+3.5
Labour hold		Swing	-3.7	

General election 1929: Liverpool West Toxteth
Party	Candidate	Votes	%	±%
Labour	Joseph Gibbins	19,988	55.1	+4.5
Unionist	Geoffrey Watson	16,309	44.9	−4.5
Majority		3,679	10.2	+9.0
Turnout		36,297	76.2	−3.5
Labour hold		Swing	+4.5	

=== Elections in the 1930s ===
General election 1931: Liverpool West Toxteth
Party	Candidate	Votes	%	±%
Conservative	Clyde Wilson	20,633	57.9	+13.0
Labour	Joseph Gibbins	14,978	42.1	−13.0
Majority		5,655	15.8	N/A
Turnout		35,611	76.1	−0.1
Conservative gain from Labour		Swing	+13.0	

1935 Liverpool West Toxteth by-election
Party	Candidate	Votes	%	±%
Labour	Joseph Gibbins	14,908	60.9	+18.8
Conservative	John William Jones Cremlyn	9,565	39.1	−18.8
Majority		5,343	21.8	N/A
Turnout		24,473	53.9	−22.2
Labour gain from Conservative		Swing	+18.8	

General election 1935: Liverpool West Toxteth
Party	Candidate	Votes	%	±%
Labour	Joseph Gibbins	18,543	52.9	−8.0
Conservative	Randolph Churchill	16,539	47.1	+8.0
Majority		2,004	5.8	−16.0
Turnout		35,082	78.6	+24.7
Labour hold		Swing	―8.0	

General Election 1939–40

Another General Election was required to take place before the end of 1940. The political parties had been making preparations for an election to take place and by the Autumn of 1939, the following candidates had been selected;

- Labour: Evelyn Walkden
- Conservative:

=== Elections in the 1940s ===
General election 1945: Liverpool West Toxteth
Party	Candidate	Votes	%	±%
Labour	Joseph Gibbins	14,780	59.7	+6.8
Conservative	Reginald Bevins	9,966	40.3	―6.8
Majority		4,814	19.4	+13.6
Turnout		24,746	68.5	―10.1
Labour hold		Swing	+6.8	
