= Clyde Wilson (politician) =

British Conservative Party politician

Clyde Tabor Wilson (21 September 1889 – 13 November 1971) was a British Conservative Party politician.

Born in Birkenhead on Merseyside, he moved to London to study law and was called to the bar at the Inner Temple in 1913.

From 1925 to 1935 he sat as a Municipal Reform Party councillor representing Wandsworth Central on the London County Council. The Municipal Reformers were allied to the parliamentary Conservatives.

At the 1931 general election, he was elected member of parliament (MP) for Liverpool West Toxteth, winning the seat with a large majority over the sitting Labour Party MP, Joseph Gibbins. This was Wilson's second attempt to enter Parliament – he had unsuccessfully contested the 1929 general election in the Labour-held London constituency of Lambeth North. In 1934 he was appointed Recorder of Birkenhead. He served less than four years in the House of Commons, resigning his seat in 1935 to become a Metropolitan Police magistrate. At the resulting by-election in July 1935, Gibbins regained the seat.

Wilson retired from his post as magistrate in 1962. He died at his home in Eastbourne in 1971, aged 82.

Parliament of the United Kingdom
Preceded by Joseph Gibbins	Member of Parliament for Liverpool West Toxteth; 1931 – 1935	Succeeded by Joseph Gibbins
