= Reginald Bevins =

British politician (1908–1996)

The Right Honourable Reginald Bevins
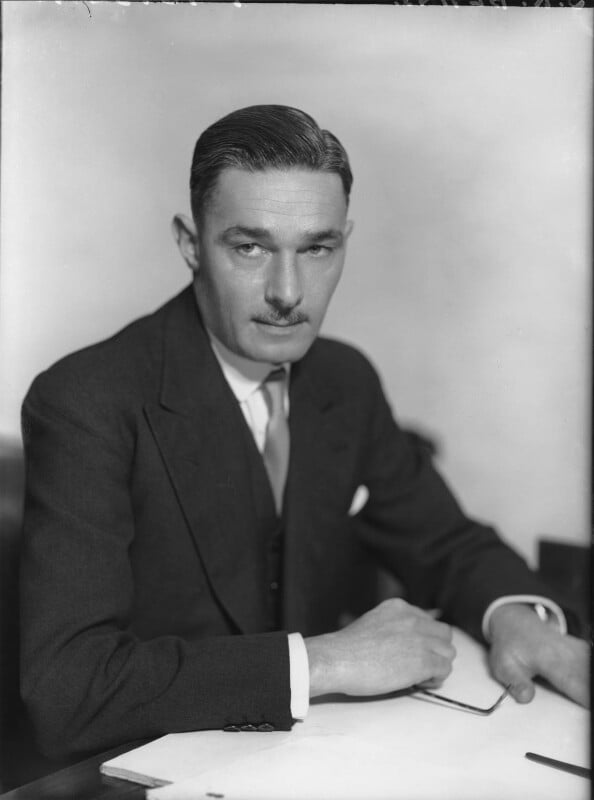
- Bevins in 1953

Postmaster General
- In office 1959–1964
- Preceded by: Ernest Marples
- Succeeded by: Tony Benn

Parliamentary Secretary to the Ministry of Housing and Local Government
- In office 1957–1959
- Preceded by: Enoch Powell
- Succeeded by: Sir Keith Joseph

Parliamentary Secretary to the Ministry of Works
- In office 1953–1957
- Preceded by: Hugh Molson
- Succeeded by: Harmar Nicholls

Member of Parliament for Liverpool Toxteth
- In office 23 February 1950 – 25 September 1964
- Preceded by: Constituency created
- Succeeded by: Richard Crawshaw

Personal details
- Born: 20 August 1908 Liverpool
- Died: 16 November 1996 (aged 88) Liverpool
- Party: Conservative

John Reginald Bevins (20 August 1908 – 16 November 1996) was a British Conservative politician who served as a Liverpool Member of Parliament (MP) for fourteen years. He served in the governments of the 1950s and 1960s, playing an important role in establishing independent television.

== Early life ==
Born in Liverpool, Lancashire, Bevins was one of five children. He was educated at the Dovedale Road School and then at Liverpool Collegiate School. He joined the insurance business, and also became interested in politics: he joined the Labour Party. In 1935 he was elected to Liverpool City Council.

== Wartime service ==
At the outbreak of the Second World War, Bevins enlisted in the Royal Artillery. He served as a gunner in 1940, and was stationed in the middle-east and in Europe. He completed his tour of duty as a Major in the Royal Army Service Corps, and became a strong supporter of the Conservative Party. At the conclusion of the war he immediately sought a Parliamentary nomination. He was chosen to run for the West Toxteth division Labour-held seat; he lost by 4,814 votes, on a pro-Labour swing much less than the national average.

== Search for a seat ==
Bevins, who remained on the City Council after his change of parties, became a popular figure in the Liverpool Conservative Association. In 1947 he was chosen to fight the Liverpool Edge Hill division in a by-election. Although he did not win, he reduced the Labour majority to less than 2,000. Boundary changes announced the next year created a united seat in Liverpool Toxteth, and the sitting Member of Parliament for East Toxteth, Patrick Buchan-Hepburn, chose to move constituencies to Beckenham. Bevins was chosen to attempt to retain the new seat for the Conservatives.

== Parliament ==
He succeeded in the 1950 general election by 2,620 votes. When the Conservative Party returned to office in 1951, Bevins was appointed as Parliamentary Private Secretary to the Minister of Housing and Local Government, Harold Macmillan. His knowledge of Liverpool municipal housing issues was valuable to the Minister who was leading a housing drive. In November 1953, he was brought into the government himself as Parliamentary Secretary to the Ministry of Works.

== Rise through Government ==
Macmillan became Prime Minister in January 1957 and moved Bevins back to the Ministry of Housing and Local Government. He had a key role in guiding through Parliament the Rent Act 1957, which removed rent control and was highly controversial. After the 1959 general election, Bevins was appointed Postmaster-General, placing him in control of a government department. Although the role was not in Macmillan's cabinet and rather low in the formal priorities, it had a higher public profile than this situation would suggest. Bevins was also appointed to the Privy Council and became "The Right Honourable Reginald Bevins".

== Postmaster General ==
Among the responsibilities for the Postmaster General was television. Bevins was, like Macmillan, a supporter of commercial television, which many in the Conservative Party then regarded as un-British. He had guidance from a friend of Macmillan, Norman Collins, who was involved in Associated TeleVision (ATV). Bevins had a delicate role as the potential profitability of the new entertainment medium was high; Bevins observed that when Lord Thomson said commercial television was "a licence to print money", he had been more indiscreet than inaccurate. In November 1962, Bevins was telephoned by journalists who asked him about the new BBC satire programme That Was The Week That Was; Bevins said he intended to do something about it. However, Macmillan immediately sent him a memo telling him to do nothing.

After the Great Train Robbery in August 1963, Bevins was criticised for laxity in security as the robbery had happened on a mail train. He moved to increase security, but resisted calls to have armed police guarding the trains. That October, Bevins was shocked at the choice of Sir Alec Douglas-Home as the new Prime Minister (to replace Macmillan), as he thought Douglas-Home was part of the upper-class traditional leadership of the Conservatives who would find it difficult to win support from the electorate.

The General Post Office workers' pay negotiations of 1964 were particularly fraught. The government was running an incomes policy, but Bevins pressed for an offer of 5%; the Cabinet insisted on a lower offer, which resulted in a strike threat. The eventual settlement was 6·5%, and Bevins ended up taking the blame for fuelling wage inflation; he felt resentful, on the ground that his own approach would have led to a lower settlement.

== Defeat ==
At the 1964 general election, Bevins lost his marginal seat. He immediately declared he would have no further political involvement until the upper-class establishment was removed from the Conservative leadership. Although supporting Reginald Maudling, he was cheered by Edward Heath's election in 1965. He knew he would have no chance of a comeback in politics and wrote a book called The Greasy Pole, which laid bare his bitterness with his treatment. He also called for reforms of Parliamentary procedure to reduce the Parliamentary week to three days and to sit for only 20 weeks in the year.

Bevins worked for Francis Industries, an engineering company. His son Anthony Bevins became a political journalist.

Parliament of the United Kingdom
Preceded by Patrick Buchan-Hepburn (East); Joseph Gibbins (West)	Member of Parliament for Liverpool Toxteth; 1950–1964	Succeeded by Richard Crawshaw
Political offices
Preceded by Hugh Molson	Parliamentary Secretary to the Ministry of Works; 1953–1957	Succeeded by Harmar Nicholls
Preceded by Enoch Powell	Parliamentary Secretary to the Ministry of Housing and Local Government; 1957–1959	Succeeded by Sir Keith Joseph
Preceded by Ernest Marples	Postmaster General; 1959–1964	Succeeded by Tony Benn
