= Liverpool Toxteth =

Parliamentary constituency in the United Kingdom, 1950-1983

- Former borough constituency for the House of Commons
- Liverpool Toxteth in Lancashire, showing boundaries used from 1974-1983

1950–1983
- Seats: one
- Created from: Liverpool East Toxteth and Liverpool West Toxteth
- Replaced by: Liverpool Mossley Hill and Liverpool Riverside

Liverpool Toxteth was a borough constituency represented in the House of Commons of the Parliament of the United Kingdom. It elected one Member of Parliament (MP) by the first past the post system of election.

== Boundaries ==
The constituency was named after the Toxteth district, in the south inner-city area of Liverpool. The city is in the south west of the historic county of Lancashire. It is now part of the Metropolitan county of Merseyside and the North West of England region.

The constituency was created from the 1950 United Kingdom general election. It included parts of the former Liverpool East Toxteth and Liverpool West Toxteth constituencies.

The constituency comprised the following wards of Liverpool.

1. 1950–1955: Dingle, Princes Park, Sefton Park East, and Sefton Park West. Dingle and Princes Park had formed part of the old West Toxteth division, whilst the two Sefton Park wards were transferred from the old East Toxteth.
2. 1955–1974: Arundel, Dingle, Princes Park, and St Michael's.
3. 1974–1983: Arundel, Dingle, Granby, Princes Park, and St Michael's.

From the 1983 United Kingdom general election the constituency was abolished. Its territory contributed 53.1% of the new constituency of Liverpool Riverside and 8.6% of Liverpool Mossley Hill. Liverpool Riverside broadly combined the old Scotland Exchange and Toxteth divisions. Scotland Exchange itself was a 1974 amalgamation of two earlier constituencies. This was a result of the long-term decline in the population of inner city Liverpool in the latter part of the twentieth century.

== Members of Parliament ==
Elected	Member	Party
1950	Reginald Bevins	Conservative
1964	Richard Crawshaw	Labour
1981	Richard Crawshaw	Social Democratic
1983	constituency abolished	

== Election results ==
=== Elections in the 1950s ===
General election 1950: Liverpool Toxteth
Party	Candidate	Votes	%	±%
Conservative	Reginald Bevins	21,658	49.5	
Labour	Joseph Gibbins	19,038	43.5	
Liberal	Anne Holt	3,030	6.9	
Majority		2,620	6.0	
Turnout		43,726	80.4	
Conservative win (new seat)				

General election 1951: Liverpool Toxteth
Party	Candidate	Votes	%	±%
Conservative	Reginald Bevins	23,254	54.2	+4.7
Labour Co-op	William E. Lawn	19,620	45.8	+2.3
Majority		3,634	8.4	+2.4
Turnout		42,874	77.5	―2.9
Conservative hold		Swing	+1.2	

General election 1955: Liverpool Toxteth
Party	Candidate	Votes	%	±%
Conservative	Reginald Bevins	20,576	56.2	+2.0
Labour Co-op	William E. Lawn	16,037	43.8	―2.0
Majority		4,539	12.4	+4.0
Turnout		36,613	69.6	―7.9
Conservative hold		Swing	+2.0	

General election 1959: Liverpool Toxteth
Party	Candidate	Votes	%	±%
Conservative	Reginald Bevins	19,575	55.6	―0.6
Labour	William H. Sefton	15,660	44.4	+0.6
Majority		3,915	11.2	―1.2
Turnout		35,235	70.9	+1.3
Conservative hold		Swing	―0.6	

=== Elections in the 1960s ===
General election 1964: Liverpool Toxteth
Party	Candidate	Votes	%	±%
Labour	Richard Crawshaw	17,080	54.4	+10.0
Conservative	Reginald Bevins	14,296	45.6	―10.0
Majority		2,784	8.8	N/A
Turnout		31,376	67.6	―3.3
Labour gain from Conservative		Swing	+10.0	

General election 1966: Liverpool Toxteth
Party	Candidate	Votes	%	±%
Labour	Richard Crawshaw	16,488	56.6	+2.2
Conservative	Brian Mervyn Keefe	12,643	43.4	―2.2
Majority		3,845	13.2	+4.4
Turnout		29,131	65.8	―1.8
Labour hold		Swing	+2.2	

=== Elections in the 1970s ===
General election 1970: Liverpool Toxteth
Party	Candidate	Votes	%	±%
Labour	Richard Crawshaw	15,276	54.4	―2.2
Conservative	Brian Mervyn Keefe	12,820	45.6	+2.2
Majority		2,456	8.8	―4.4
Turnout		28,096	62.3	―3.5
Labour hold		Swing	―2.2	

General election February 1974: Liverpool Toxteth
Party	Candidate	Votes	%	±%
Labour	Richard Crawshaw	14,354	47.7	―6.7
Conservative	Humfrey Malins	8,797	29.2	―16.4
Liberal	Trevor Jones	6,678	22.2	New
Workers Revolutionary	William Hunter	263	0.9	New
Majority		5,557	18.5	+9.7
Turnout		30,092	66.0	+3.7
Labour hold		Swing	+4.9	

General election October 1974: Liverpool Toxteth
Party	Candidate	Votes	%	±%
Labour	Richard Crawshaw	15,312	56.9	+9.2
Conservative	Humfrey Malins	8,062	30.0	+0.8
Liberal	David Loughlin Mahon	3,176	11.8	―10.4
Workers Revolutionary	John Samuel Dillon	365	1.4	+0.5
Majority		7,250	26.9	+8.4
Turnout		26,915	58.7	―7.3
Labour hold		Swing	+4.2	

General election 1979: Liverpool Toxteth
Party	Candidate	Votes	%	±%
Labour	Richard Crawshaw	14,833	54.7	―2.2
Conservative	Anthony Wilson Shone	8,690	32.1	+2.1
Liberal	Christine Ruth Addison	3,206	11.8	±0.0
Socialist Unity	Paul Adams	238	0.9	New
Workers Revolutionary	Delores Elliot	148	0.6	―0.8
Majority		6,143	22.7	―4.2
Turnout		35,805	64.8	+6.1
Labour hold		Swing	―2.2	

== Sources ==
- Boundaries of Parliamentary Constituencies 1885-1972, compiled and edited by F.W.S. Craig (Parliamentary Reference Publications 1972)
- British Parliamentary Constituencies: A Statistical Compendium, by Ivor Crewe and Anthony Fox (Faber and Faber 1984)
- British Parliamentary Election Results 1950-1973, compiled and edited by F.W.S. Craig (Parliamentary Research Services 1983)
- Who's Who of British Members of Parliament, Volume IV 1945-1979, edited by M. Stenton and S. Lees (Harvester Press 1981)
