= Social Democratic Party (UK) =

Political party in the United Kingdom (1981–88)

- Abbreviation: SDP
- Founders: Roy Jenkins; David Owen; Bill Rodgers; Shirley Williams
- Founded: 26 March 1981
- Dissolved: 3 March 1988
- Split from: Labour Party
- Merged into: Liberal Democrats
- Succeeded by: SDP (1988) (minority)
- Headquarters: 4 Cowley Street, London
- Youth wing: Young Social Democrats
- Ideology: Social democracy; Social liberalism; Pro-Europeanism
- Political position: Centre to centre-left
- National affiliation: SDP–Liberal Alliance
- European Parliament group: Technical Group of Independents (1983–1984)
- Colours: Red and blue
- Slogan: Breaking the Mould

The Social Democratic Party (SDP) was a centre to centre-left political party in the United Kingdom. The party supported a mixed economy (favouring a system inspired by the German social market economy), electoral reform, European integration and a decentralised state while rejecting the possibility of trade unions being overly influential within industrial relations. The SDP officially advocated for social democracy, and unofficially for social liberalism as well.

The SDP was founded on 26 March 1981 by four senior Labour Party moderates, dubbed the "Gang of Four": Roy Jenkins, David Owen, Bill Rodgers, and Shirley Williams, who issued the Limehouse Declaration. Owen and Rodgers were sitting Labour Members of Parliament (MPs); Jenkins had left Parliament in 1977 to serve as President of the European Commission, while Williams had lost her seat in the 1979 general election. All four had held cabinet experience in the 1970s under Wilson and Callaghan before Labour lost power in 1979. The four left the Labour Party as a result of the January 1981 Wembley conference, which committed the party to unilateral nuclear disarmament and withdrawal from the European Economic Community. They also believed that Labour had become too left-wing under Michael Foot, and had been infiltrated at the constituency party level by the Trotskyist Militant tendency, whose views and behaviour they considered to be at odds with the Parliamentary Labour Party and Labour voters.

Shortly after its formation, the SDP formed a political and electoral alliance with the Liberal Party, the SDP–Liberal Alliance, which lasted through the 1983 and 1987 general elections. In 1988, the two parties merged, forming the Social and Liberal Democrats, later renamed the Liberal Democrats, although a minority, led by Owen, left to form a continuing SDP.

== History ==
=== Origins ===
The origin of the party can be traced back to the ideological divisions in the Labour Party in the 1950s (with its forerunner being the Campaign for Democratic Socialism established to support the Gaitskellites), but publicly lies in the 1979 Dimbleby Lecture given by Roy Jenkins as he neared the end of his presidency of the European Commission. Jenkins argued the necessity for a realignment in British politics, and discussed whether this could be brought about from within the existing Liberal Party, or from a new group driven by European principles of social democracy.

In some areas, followers of the Militant tendency were held to be systematically targeting weak local party branches in safe seat areas in order to have their own candidates selected, and thus become MPs. Eddie Milne at Blyth and Dick Taverne in Lincoln were both victims of such intrigues during the 1970s, but in both cases there was enough of a local outcry by party members – and the electorate – for them to win their seats as independents.

==== March 1973 Lincoln by-election ====
In Taverne's case, he had been fighting efforts by the Lincoln Constituency Labour Party to deselect him largely over his support for British membership of the European Communities. In October 1972 he resigned his seat to force a by-election in which he fought as a Democratic Labour candidate against the official party candidate. Taverne won by an unexpectedly large margin. He founded the short lived Campaign for Social Democracy (CFSD) thereafter, and wrote a book about events surrounding the by-election called The Future of the Left – Lincoln and After (1972). But the CFSD failed to gain nationwide support, and Taverne lost the seat at the October 1974 general election. Some independent Social Democrats contested the October 1974 and 1979 general elections, but none were elected.

Taverne's Lincoln by-election campaign was also helped to a lesser degree by problems with the Conservative candidate, Monday Club chairman Jonathan Guinness. His suggestion during the by-election that murderers should have razor blades left in their cells so they could decently commit suicide resulted in him being nicknamed "Old Razor Blades" during the campaign. This, combined with considerable Conservative grassroots disquiet over the Monday Club's links to the National Front, persuaded some Conservative voters to switch to Taverne in protest as much as tactically to ensure Labour suffered an embarrassing loss. (Guinness had been elected as Chairman specifically to eradicate such links.)

=== Creation of the SDP ===
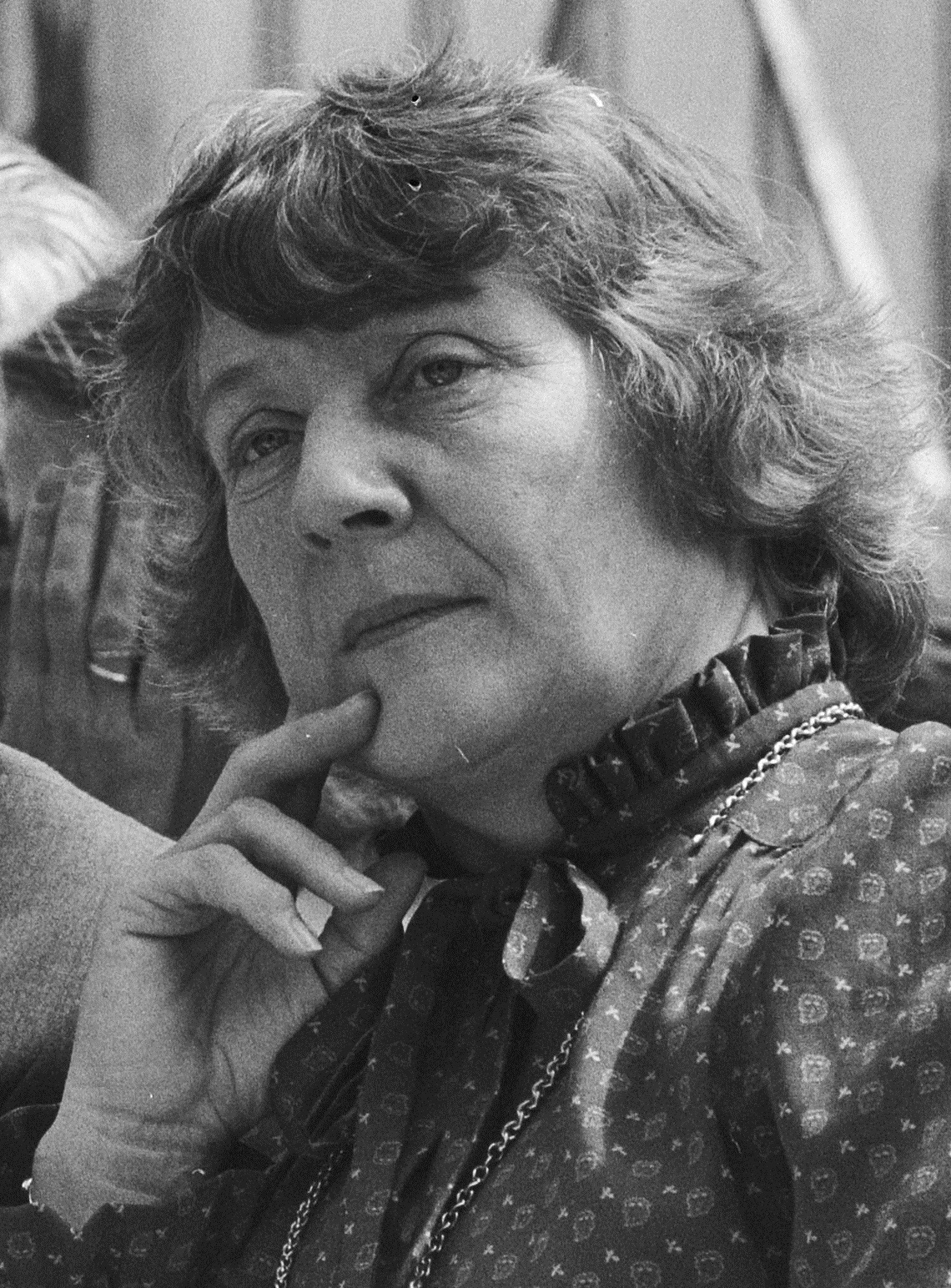
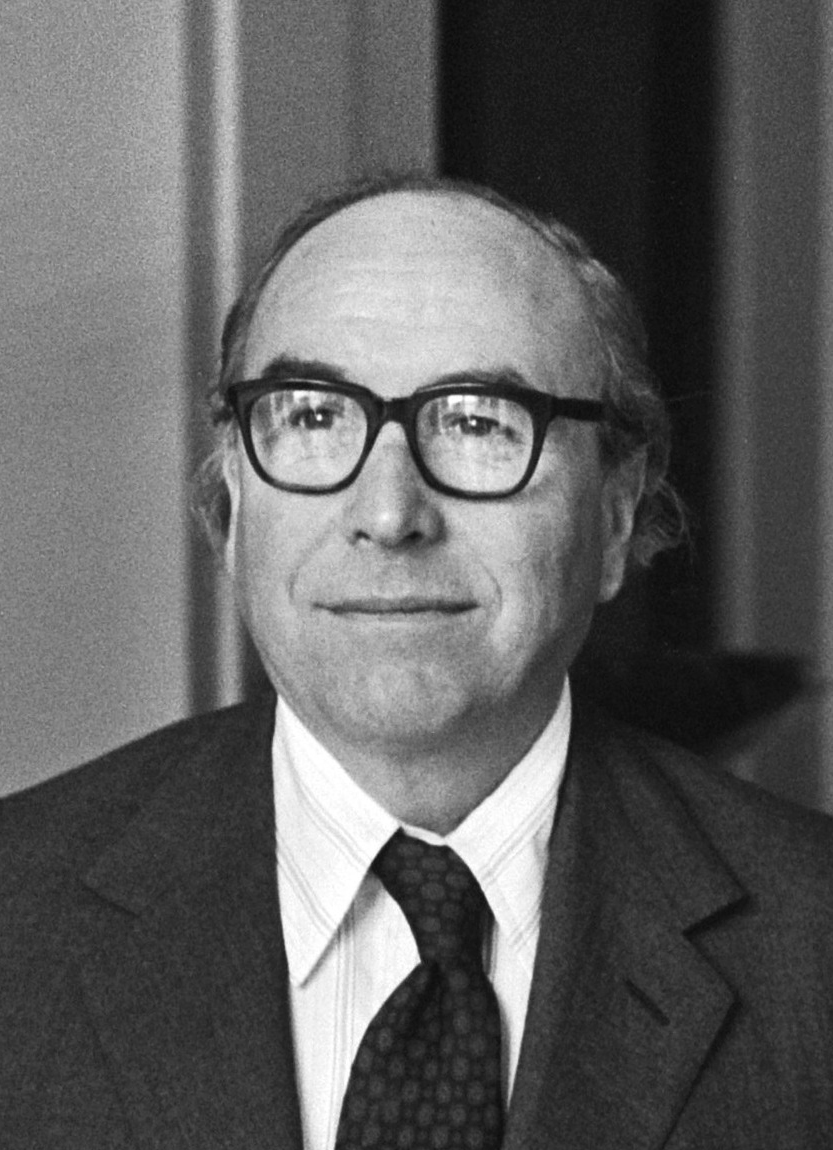
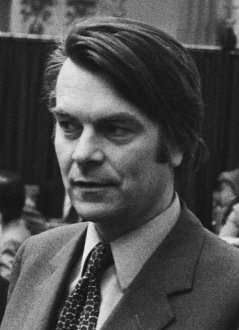
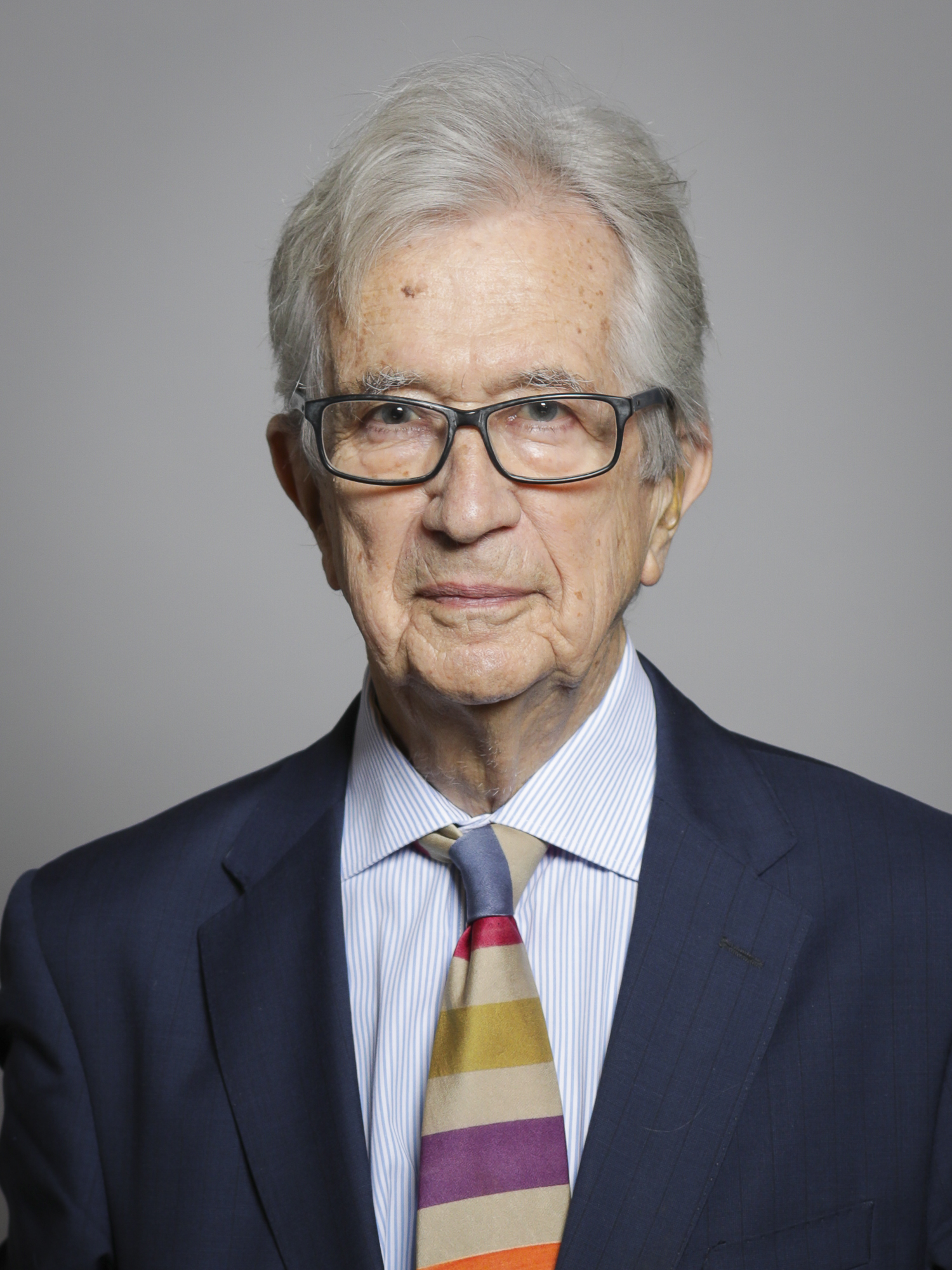
The gang of four, clockwise; Shirley Williams, Roy Jenkins, Bill Rodgers, David Owen

On 25 January 1981, leading figures from the Labour Party (Roy Jenkins, David Owen, Shirley Williams and Bill Rodgers, known collectively as the "Gang of Four") launched the Council for Social Democracy, after outlining their policies in what became known as the Limehouse Declaration. In March it was renamed the Social Democratic Party. The "Gang of Four" were centrists, who defected from the Labour Party due to what they perceived to be the outsized influence of Militant and the "hard left" within the party.

Thirteen Labour MPs initially declared support for the Council for Social Democracy. On 20 February 1981, three of these Tom Ellis, Richard Crawshaw and Ian Wrigglesworth resigned the Labour whip and another, Tom Bradley, announced he would not contest his seat again as a Labour candidate. These moves were reported to be a clear move towards formally creating a new centre party. Former Labour Party deputy leader George Brown also announced his membership of the Council for Social Democracy.

Possible names for the party included ones similar to Labour, such as "Democratic Labour", "Progressive Labour" and "New Labour" (Note: Future Labour Party leader and eventual Prime Minister Tony Blair would later use "New Labour" to promote the Labour Party. (see: New Labour)). Other, simpler names like "Democratic", "Radical", "Progressive" and "Centre" were also all mentioned as possible names for the new party. However, eventually a consensus emerged for the "Social Democratic" name as it helped to distinguish the party from Labour, and had been widely used to refer to the group in the media.

The opening statement of principles contained in the preamble of the party's constitution stated that: "The SDP exists to create and defend an open, classless and more equal society which rejects prejudices based upon sex, race, colour or religion". The constitution set out the establishment of a "Council for Social Democracy" (CSD) which was, in effect, the party's standing conference. Each area party was entitled to elect delegates to the CSD. A number of internal groups flourished within the new party, the most notable of which was the Tawney Society (mirroring the function of the Fabian Society within the Labour Party).

Twenty-eight Labour MPs eventually joined the new party, along with one Conservative MP, Christopher Brocklebank-Fowler of North West Norfolk, who joined on 16 March 1981. Williams and Jenkins were not at the time Members of Parliament, but were elected to the House of Commons at by-elections in Crosby in 1981 and Glasgow Hillhead in 1982 respectively.

The defecting Labour MPs were:

- Tom Bradley (Leicester East) – joined new party on its launch, 2 March 1981
- Ronald Brown (Hackney South and Shoreditch) – joined on 2 December 1981
- John Cartwright (Woolwich East) – joined new party on its launch, 2 March 1981
- Richard Crawshaw (Liverpool Toxteth) – resigned Lab whip 20 February 1981, joined new party on its launch, 2 March 1981
- George Cunningham (Islington South and Finsbury) – resigned Lab whip 30 November 1981, joined on 16 June 1982
- Bruce Douglas-Mann (Mitcham and Morden, resigned his seat and lost the ensuing by-election) – joined on 11 December 1981
- James Dunn (Liverpool Kirkdale) – joined on 7 October 1981
- Tom Ellis (Wrexham) – resigned Lab whip 20 February 1981, joined new party on its launch, 2 March 1981
- David Ginsburg (Dewsbury) – joined on 6 October 1981
- John Grant (Islington Central) – joined on 16 November 1981
- John Horam (Gateshead West) – joined new party on its launch, 2 March 1981
- Ednyfed Hudson Davies (Caerphilly) – joined on 22 December 1981
- Edward Lyons (Bradford West) – joined on 19 March 1981
- Dr. Dickson Mabon (Greenock and Port Glasgow) – joined on 1 October 1981
- Bryan Magee (Leyton) – resigned Lab whip 22 January 1982, joined in March 1982
- Robert Maclennan (Caithness and Sutherland) – joined new party on its launch, 2 March 1981
- Tom McNally (Stockport South) – joined on 7 October 1981
- Bob Mitchell (Southampton Itchen) – joined on 5 October 1981
- Eric Ogden (Liverpool West Derby) – joined on 29 October 1981
- Michael O'Halloran (Islington North) – joined on 7 September 1981; resigned from SDP on 10 February 1983, after not being selected as a general election candidate
- David Owen (Plymouth Devonport) – joined new party on its launch, 2 March 1981
- William Rodgers (Stockton-on-Tees) – joined new party on its launch, 2 March 1981
- John Roper (Farnworth) – joined new party on its launch, 2 March 1981
- Neville Sandelson (Hayes and Harlington) – joined new party on its launch, 2 March 1981
- Jeffrey Thomas (Abertillery) – joined on 11 December 1981
- Mike Thomas (Newcastle East) – joined new party on its launch, 2 March 1981
- James Wellbeloved (Erith and Crayford) – joined on 4 July 1981
- Ian Wrigglesworth (Thornaby) – joined new party on its launch, 2 March 1981

Nine Labour members of the House of Lords also joined the SDP on its creation, eight of whom had previously held ministerial office. In a letter to Labour Party leader Michael Foot, the defecting peers said they had taken their decision "with great sorrow". They were:

- Herbert Bowden, Baron Aylestone
- Jack Diamond, Baron Diamond
- John Harris, Baron Harris of Greenwich
- Henry Walston, Baron Walston
- Elaine Burton, Baroness Burton of Coventry
- Jack Donaldson, Baron Donaldson of Kingsbridge
- Wayland Young, 2nd Baron Kennet
- Ian Winterbottom, Baron Winterbottom
- Michael Young, Baron Young of Dartington

Much of the party's initial public membership came from the Social Democratic Alliance. The party also received a boost with the recruitment of former student leaders from outside the Labour Party. These included former Communist Party of Great Britain member Sue Slipman as well as Conservative Party members including Adair Turner and Tom Hayhoe.

Although the SDP was seen as being largely a breakaway from the right wing of the Labour Party, a 1984 internal party survey found that 65% of its membership had not belonged to a political party before, with 22% being drawn from Labour, 8% from the Conservatives and 8% from the Liberals. A 1981 Opinion Research Centre survey of SDP members commissioned by Weekend World found that 72% of SDP members had never been in a party before were joining a political party for the very first time, and that only 15% being former Labour Party members.

The party enjoyed a considerable honeymoon period with the press, who made much mileage out of Roy Jenkins' apocryphal fondness for claret; claret is an "agreeable" wine, and a metaphor for the party's harmonious internal relations compared to those of the strife-torn Labour Party of the period.

The policies of the SDP emphasised a middle position between the perceived extremes of Thatcherism and the Labour Party. Its constitution argued for "the fostering of a strong public sector and a strong private sector without frequent frontier changes". The SDP favoured some neoliberal Thatcherite reforms during the 1980s, such as legislation aimed at restricting trade unions (although the parliamentary SDP actually split three ways on Norman Tebbit's 1982 Industrial Relations Bill, most voting for, some against, and others abstaining). However, the party took a more welfarist position than the Conservative Party, being more sceptical of Conservative welfare reforms (particularly regarding the National Health Service).

At the party's first electoral contest, Jenkins narrowly failed to win a by-election at Warrington in July 1981, describing it as his "first defeat (in many years), but by far my greatest victory". At the Glasgow Hillhead by-election in March 1982, another candidate called Douglas Parkin, nominated by a party called the Social Democratic Party which had been formed in Manchester in 1979, changed his name to Roy Harold Jenkins to contest the seat. SDP polling agents were given special dispensation by the Returning Officer to have placards outside of polling stations to state which one on the ballot papers was the real Roy. Ultimately, the SDP's Jenkins was elected.

A leadership election was held later in the year, Jenkins beating Owen in the ballot to become the first leader of the new party. Later in the year, Shirley Williams defeated Bill Rodgers in the ballot to become SDP president.

=== The Alliance ===
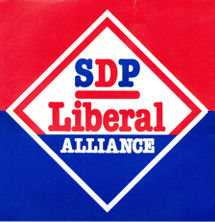
SDP–Liberal Alliance electoral logo in 1983

The SDP formed the SDP–Liberal Alliance with the Liberal Party in June 1981, under the joint leadership of Roy Jenkins and Liberal leader David Steel. The Liberal Party, and Steel in particular, had applauded the formation of the SDP from the sidelines from the very start. Senior Liberal MP for Rochdale Cyril Smith caused some embarrassment, however, by publicly stating that the SDP "should be strangled at birth".

During an era of wide unemployment and public disillusionment with Labour and the Conservatives, the Alliance achieved considerable success at parliamentary by-elections. At one point in late 1981, the Alliance had an opinion poll rating of over 50%. That same year, David Steel addressed the Liberal Party conference with the phrase "Go back to your constituencies, and prepare for government!"

In early 1982, after public disagreements over who could fight which seats in the forthcoming election, the Alliance's poll rating dipped, but they remained ahead of both Labour and the Conservatives. However, following the outbreak of the Falklands War on 2 April 1982, the Conservative government of Margaret Thatcher soared from third to first place in the public opinion polls, and the Alliance and Labour declined. By this stage, however, the SDP already had 28 MPs in parliament.

Labour lost Bermondsey, one of their ten safest seats, at a by-election in February 1983 to Liberal candidate Simon Hughes. Sitting Labour MP Robert Mellish had resigned to work for the London Docklands Development Corporation but, being opposed to the selection by his left-wing Constituency Labour Party of Peter Tatchell, supported the former leader of Southwark council John O'Grady as "Real Bermondsey Labour" giving an impression of Labour division and in-fighting.

At the 1983 general election, the SDP–Liberal Alliance won more than 25% of the national vote, close behind Labour's 28%, but well behind the 44% secured by the Conservatives. However, because of the characteristics of the first-past-the-post system used in the United Kingdom, only 23 Alliance MPs were elected; just six of those were members of the SDP. The party's leader, Roy Jenkins, managed to retain his seat at Glasgow Hillhead, but SDP President Shirley Williams was defeated at Crosby (which she had won at a by-election in November 1981) as a result of unfavourable boundary changes. Labour Party leader Michael Foot, who resigned within days of the election, was critical of the SDP–Liberal Alliance for siphoning support away from Labour, allowing the Conservatives to win more seats and secure a triple-digit majority, while Labour was left with 209 seats in Parliament.

Following the result, Jenkins was pressured to step down as leader of the SDP by David Owen, MP of Plymouth Devonport who between 1974 and 1979 had been a minister in the Labour governments of Harold Wilson and James Callaghan. On 13 June, Jenkins stood down and of the six SDP MPs elected in 1983, only Owen stood for leader of the Party. Subsequently he became leader without any contest a week later. Owen was more sceptical about close relations with the Liberals than his predecessor Roy Jenkins, and favoured retaining the party's distinct identity. Owen's influence ensured that proposals for a merger between the two parties were shelved after a lengthy debate at the 1983 SDP conference.

During the 1983–87 parliament, some SDP members started to become unsettled at what appeared to be the increasingly right-wing course taken by Owen. This resulted in some members launching the Limehouse Group in an attempt to keep the party on the centre-left course that was first propounded in the Limehouse Declaration.

Two more SDP MPs were elected at by-elections during the 1983–87 parliament, but at the 1987 general election, the Alliance's share of the vote fell to 23%, and the SDP's parliamentary party was reduced from eight members to five. Jenkins was among those who lost their seats. Mike Hancock had won a by-election at Portsmouth South in 1984 from the Conservatives which was lost in 1987, but Rosie Barnes, who had won the bitterly contested Greenwich by-election in February 1987 from Labour, managed to hold on at the general election in June that year.

From the outset, the formation of the Alliance had raised questions as to whether it would lead to a merged party, or the two parties were destined to compete with each other. This in turn led to grassroots tensions in some areas between Liberal and SDP branches that impaired their ability to mount joint campaigns successfully. Such cross-party feuding was part of the reason for Jenkins losing his Glasgow Hillhead seat to George Galloway of Labour in 1987.

Another reason for cross-party feuding was whether the Alliance should support a minority Thatcher government or not, if that were to be the result of the 1987 election. Steel ruled out any coalition, while Owen insisted Labour was unfit to govern.

Liberal pride was further damaged by the sustained lampooning of the Alliance by the ITV sketch comedy series Spitting Image, which portrayed Steel as the craven lickspittle of Owen; One sketch had Owen proposing to a simpering Steel that the parties merge under a new name: "and for our side we'll take 'Social Democratic', and from your side, we'll take 'Party'"; and indeed a new leader "from your side we will take 'David' and from ours 'Owen'", to which a hesitant Steel agreed.

=== Merger, disestablishment and splits ===
Following the disappointment of 1987, Steel proposed a formal merger of the two parties. Jenkins and Steel had believed this to be eventually inevitable after the party failed to break through at the 1983 election. The proposal, also supported by Williams and Rodgers, was fiercely opposed by Owen, who argued that such a merger would not be accepted by the electorate, and would not reverse their declining share of the vote. Jenkins denied that a merger had been his original intent.

But the majority of the SDP's membership (along with those of the Liberals) voted in favour of the union. Owen resigned as leader and was replaced by Robert Maclennan. Steel and Maclennan headed the new "Social and Liberal Democrats" party from 3 March 1988. An interim working name for the party, the "Democrats", was adopted by conference on 26 September 1988. This proved to be unpopular, and the party was renamed the Liberal Democrats in October 1989, as had been originally proposed at the September 1988 conference by the party's Tiverton branch.

Most SDP members, including MP and future Liberal Democrat leader Charles Kennedy, joined Maclennan in the merged party, but Owen created a 'continuing' SDP along with the other two MPs, John Cartwright and Rosie Barnes. This party disbanded after coming behind the Monster Raving Loony Party at a May 1990 by-election in Bootle, although a third SDP was formed in 1990 and continues to operate on a much less influential scale. There was also a continuing Liberal Party, led by Michael Meadowcroft and David Morrish, which mainly revolved around Liverpool and West Country Liberals who feared a dilution by the former SDP members of the Liberal tradition within the merged party. It too continues in the present day.

Following the dissolution of the SDP, those senior members who refused to join the Liberal Democrats went a variety of different ways. Some, such as the former MPs John Horam and Neville Sandelson, began associating with the Conservative Party while the original SDP was still in existence, while several of Owen's young followers (including Daniel Finkelstein, Andrew Cooper and the future MP Rob Wilson) aligned with the 'continuing' SDP before endorsing the Conservatives at the 1992 general election.. A number of other Owenite SDP members, most notably David Sainsbury, Polly Toynbee, Lord Young of Dartington, Lord Kennet and Lord Diamond, instead chose to join (or rejoin) the Labour Party, and they were followed by the likes of Roger Liddle and Andrew Adonis, who spent several years as Liberal Democrats before gravitating to Labour during the early Blairite era. A select few among the 'continuing' SDP later became reconciled to joining the Liberal Democrats, but some (such as Cartwright, Barnes and Lord Kilmarnock) emulated Owen and continued to identify as 'independent Social Democrats' even after the demise of their party.

== Structure and organisation ==
The basic unit of the SDP was its Area Parties, most of which corresponded with more than one Westminster constituency. Of the 223 area parties that existed in September 1986, only 42 were single-constituency Area Parties. Area Parties were considered by party leaders as better at resisting entryism or the formation of local cliques that opposed the national party, issues the SDPs founders believed the CLPs of the Labour Party struggled with. Additionally area parties aided the SDP's coöperation SDP–Liberal Alliance, as multi-constituency area parties were at less risk of disenfranchisement in cases of Liberal Party led seats.

The Party had three key leading organs. The first was the National Committee, which was the executive body of the party, the second was the Council for Social Democracy (CSD), and the last was Policy Committee which set the policy of the SDP.

=== Policy Committee ===
The Policy Committee was a sub-committee of the National Committee, and was the most powerful body of the SDP.

Membership of the Policy Committee was composed of:

- Leader of the SDP
- President
- 10 MPs sitting on the National Committee
- 9 members elected by the National Committee

=== National Committee ===
The National Committee was the SDP's executive body and was responsible for much of the day-to-day administration of the party

Membership of the National Committee was composed of:

- Leader of the SDP
- President
- 13 Parliamentarians:
  - 10 MPs (voted on by all SDP MPs) (Note: When there were less than 10 SDP MPs, all of them would be automatically members of the National Committee)
  - 2 Peers (voted on by all SDP Peers)
  - 1 MEP (voted on by all SDP MEPs)
- 3 local councillors (Note: Only city, district, and county councillors were eligible. Town and parish councillors were not eligible) (voted on by the CSD)
- 12 area councillors (voted on by party members of each area)
- 8 directly elected members
- 1 Young Social Democrats or SDP Students representative

=== Council for Social Democracy ===
The Council for Social Democracy was the largest of the three organs. Totalling approximately 400 elected members, it was often nicknamed as the "Parliament of the Party". The constitution of the SDP stipulated that the CSD met thrice yearly, and that it be chaired by the President.

== Election results ==
=== House of Commons ===
Election	Leader	Votes		Seats		Position	Government
Election	Leader	#	%	#	±	Position	Government
1983	Roy Jenkins	3,507,803	11.5	6 / 650	▲6	4th	Conservative
1987	David Owen	3,168,183	9.7	5 / 650	▼1	4th	Conservative

As of the dissolution of parliament before the 1983 election, the SDP had 32 MPs. In the 1983 election, only 4 SDP MPs gained through defections were held.

Between the 1983–1987 elections, the SDP won two by-elections taking their total to 8 at dissolution, however neither were re-elected. They are not counted in the seats gained or lost section.

==== By-elections ====
By-election	Candidate	Votes	Percentage	Position	Winner
1981 Crosby	Shirley Williams	28,118	49.1%	1st	SDP
1981 Warrington	Roy Jenkins	12,521	42.4%	2nd	Labour
1982 Peckham	Dick Taverne	7,418	32.9%	2nd	Labour
1982 Gower	Gwynoro Jones	9,875	25.1%	2nd	Labour
1982 Mitcham and Morden	Bruce Douglas-Mann	9,032	29.4%	2nd	Conservative
1982 Glasgow Hillhead	Roy Jenkins	10,106	33.4%	1st	SDP
1984 Portsmouth South	Mike Hancock	15,358	37.6%	1st	SDP
1984 Cynon Valley	Felix Aubel	6,554	19.9%	2nd	Labour
1984 Stafford	David Dunn	14,733	31.8%	2nd	Conservative
1985 Tyne Bridge	Rod Kenyon	6,942	29.7%	2nd	Labour
1986 Fulham	Roger Liddle	6,953	18.26%	3rd	Labour
1987 Greenwich	Rosie Barnes	18,287	53.0%	1st	SDP

=== European Parliament ===
Election	Votes	%	Seats
1984	1,233,490	9.3 (#4)	0 / 81

== Leadership history ==
=== Leaders of the SDP ===
#	Name (Birth–Death)	Portrait	Constituency	Entered office	Left office
1	Roy Jenkins (1920–2003)		Glasgow Hillhead from 1982	7 July 1982	13 June 1983
2	David Owen (born 1938)		Plymouth Devonport	13 June 1983	6 August 1987
3	Robert Maclennan (1936–2020)		Caithness and Sutherland	29 August 1987	3 March 1988

=== Presidents ===
#	Name (Birth–Death)	Portrait	Entered office	Left office
1	Shirley Williams (1930–2021)		7 July 1982	29 August 1987
2	John Cartwright (1933–2024)		29 August 1987	16 July 1988

== See also ==
- Change UK
- Social Democratic Party election results
- List of elected British politicians who have changed party affiliation
- List of Labour Party breakaway parties (UK)
