= Dick Crawshaw, Baron Crawshaw of Aintree =

British Member of Parliament

Lieutenant Colonel Richard Crawshaw, Baron Crawshaw of Aintree, OBE, TD, DL (25 September 1917 – 16 July 1986) was a British politician and army officer. He was elected as a British Labour Party Member of Parliament in 1964 but joined the Social Democratic Party (SDP) in 1981.

== Early life ==
Crawshaw was born in Salford, the son of Percy Crawshaw and Beatrice (née Barrett). He attended Pendleton Grammar School, before leaving to train as an engineer at the age of 16. Prior to World War II he had been a theological student, but soon after its outbreak he enlisted in the Royal Artillery, later transferring to the Parachute Regiment. Upon demobilisation he matriculated as an undergraduate at Pembroke College, Cambridge, taking a special two-year 'war degree'. He then studied at the University of London for a Bachelor of Laws (LLB) degree, and took his pupillage at the Inner Temple. In 1948 he was called to the bar, serving on the Northern Circuit.

== Politics ==
Crawshaw became active in Liverpool politics after the war, representing the Dingle ward on Liverpool Borough Council from 1948. His council ward was very safe for the Labour Party, although the constituency that it was situated in – Liverpool Toxteth – was a marginal seat for the Conservatives from its creation in 1950. He campaigned for issues such as better standard of council housing and state schools.

Crawshaw was elected as MP for Liverpool Toxteth in 1964, beating the sitting Conservative Reginald Bevins by 2,784 votes. In parliament he was a strong supporter of the Territorial Army, being the Commanding Officer of the territorial 13th (Lancashire) Parachute Battalion, and on one occasion voted against the annual Defence Estimates because they failed to make a large enough provision for it. He was reported to have been a very diligent MP, who called on constituents' homes in several streets each week, often to the surprise of the residents.

In March 1981 Crawshaw was one of the initial group of 13 Labour MPs who founded the SDP. Unlike the other defectors, his participation was considered "something of a surprise to journalists." After Liverpool Toxteth was abolished he stood in 1983 for the new constituency of Liverpool Broadgreen, which did not contain any part of his former seat. Notionally a safe Labour constituency, Crawshaw's candidacy was further complicated by the existence of an Independent Liberal on the ballot. He received 5,169 votes (11.24%), but was beaten into last place. Crawshaw was created a life peer as Baron Crawshaw of Aintree, of Salford in the County of Greater Manchester on 17 May 1985.

== Personal life ==
Crawshaw married Audrey Lima in 1960; they had no children. He listed his hobbies in Who's Who as "Climbing, walking, free fall parachuting and youth activities", and in 1974 set a world record by walking 231 miles non-stop, raising thousands of pounds on behalf of the National Society for the Prevention of Cruelty to Children.

Crawshaw lived for most of his life in Aintree, a very safe Conservative area first in the constituency of Ormskirk, and then in the Crosby constituency—both swing seats. During his time in Parliament he lived in Chelsea with fellow Liverpool Labour MP James Dunn, who also joined the SDP.

Parliament of the United Kingdom
Preceded by Reginald Bevins	Member of Parliament for Liverpool Toxteth; 1964–1983	constituency abolished
