= Bruce Douglas-Mann =

British politician (1927–2000)

Member of Parliament for Mitcham and Morden
- In office 28 February 1974 – 5 May 1982
- Preceded by: Constituency created
- Succeeded by: Angela Rumbold

Member of Parliament for Kensington North
- In office 18 June 1970 – 8 February 1974
- Preceded by: George Rogers
- Succeeded by: Constituency abolished

Personal details
- Born: 23 June 1927 Bexhill, England
- Died: 27 July 2000 (aged 73)
- Party: Labour (until 1981); SDP (1982–1988); Liberal Democrats (1988–2000)
- Education: Jesus College, Oxford

Bruce Leslie Home Douglas-Mann (23 June 1927 – 27 July 2000) was a British politician.

== Early life ==
Bruce Douglas-Mann was born at Bexhill, Sussex, the son of a solicitor, Leslie John Douglas-Mann, MC.

Douglas-Mann was educated at Upper Canada College, Toronto, Ontario, Canada, and following national service in the navy, read PPE at Jesus College, Oxford, from 1948 to 1951. In 1954, he qualified as a solicitor and served as a councillor on Kensington Borough Council 1962-65 and on the Royal Borough of Kensington and Chelsea from 1964. As a solicitor he specialised in trade union law and claims over industrial accidents and injuries. He also worked on obscenity cases and briefed barrister John Mortimer on the film Last Tango in Paris. He was chairman of the Society of Labour Lawyers from 1974 to 1980.

== Parliamentary career ==
Douglas-Mann contested St Albans in 1964 and Maldon in 1966 as a Labour candidate. He was elected Member of Parliament for Kensington North in 1970, then for Mitcham and Morden in February 1974.

Douglas-Mann spoke out on the plight of refugees. In 1971, in the East Bengal (now Bangladesh) refugee crisis (during the Bangladesh Liberation War) he said it was "the worst tragedy the world had known" and the following year, when Idi Amin ordered the expulsion of Asians from Uganda he said that returning them would be "like sending Jews back to Hitler in the 1930s". Having been involved in housing case work as a solicitor, following Norman St John-Stevas introduction of the parliamentary select committees in 1979, he served on the PSC concerning the environment because housing was part of its remit.

In 1982, Douglas-Mann was one of the later defectors among Labour MPs to the new Social Democratic Party (SDP). He made the unique decision to resign and seek re-election at a by-election after his change of allegiance. It was the source of disquiet among the leadership of the SDP, and the constituency party choose the former Labour MP as their candidate without the approval of national headquarters. Initially the candidate was told that he would have to finance his own by-election. Douglas-Mann was the last MP to trigger a by-election after switching parties until Douglas Carswell in 2014. He lost to the Conservative candidate Angela Rumbold and was pushed into third place when he stood again at the 1983 general election. He tried one final time in 1987, but remained in third and last place with only 16.6 per cent.

Parliament of the United Kingdom
| Preceded by George Rogers | Member of Parliament for Kensington North; 1970 – February 1974 | Constituency abolished |
| New constituency | Member of Parliament for Mitcham and Morden; February 1974–1982 | Succeeded by Angela Rumbold |
