= 1982 Mitcham and Morden by-election =

UK parliamentary by-election

- 3 June 1982

Constituency of Mitcham and Morden
- Turnout: 48.5% (▼28.4%)
	First party	Second party	Third party
		SDP	Lab
Candidate	Angela Rumbold	Bruce Douglas-Mann	David Nicholas
Party	Conservative	SDP	Labour
Popular vote	13,306	9,032	7,475
Percentage	43.4%	29.4%	24.4%
Swing	▼0.5%	▲20.5%	▼20.8%
MP before election
Bruce Douglas-Mann
Labour
Subsequent MP
Angela Rumbold
Conservative

The 1982 Mitcham and Morden by-election was held on 3 June 1982. It was a rare example of a governing party (the British Conservatives) gaining a seat in a by-election.

== Overview ==
The by-election was caused by the resignation of Bruce Douglas-Mann, the Member of Parliament for Mitcham and Morden. Douglas-Mann had retained the seat for the Labour Party since its creation for the February 1974 general election. The constituency had been created from parts of Merton and Morden and Mitcham, both of which had usually generally returned Conservative Party MPs. At the 1979 general election, Douglas-Mann had held the seat with a majority of only 618 votes over the Conservatives.

Douglas-Mann decided in early 1982 to join the recently formed Social Democratic Party (SDP); several other MPs had already joined the party. Although there was no requirement to do so, he decided to resign his seat and stand in the resulting by-election in order to gain a mandate for his change of allegiance.

With a Conservative government in power, their share of the vote might have been expected to decline, but with the Falklands War in progress, their approval ratings were high, and the party hoped to make a decent showing. The party stood Angela Rumbold, a councillor in Kingston-upon-Thames.

The Labour Party, suffering from defections to the SDP, considered itself unlikely to hold the seat and stood David Nicholas.

The Liberal Party had agreed an electoral pact with the SDP the previous autumn and so did not stand a candidate against Douglas-Mann. However, Edward Larkin stood as an independent Liberal candidate.

Several other candidates stood. The far-right British National Front stood Joseph Pearce. Veteran by-election candidate Bill Boaks stood as a "Democratic Monarchist". Roy Sawh, a long-term campaigner for equal rights, stood as the "Ethnic Minority Candidate". Jitendra Bardwaj, who had been convicted of assaulting a police officer outside the House of Commons, stood as "COPS", in an attempt to highlight what he held was his unjust treatment, and Christopher Farnsworth stood as a "Computer Democrat".

== Result ==
While the Conservative vote declined slightly, Rumbold was able to achieve an easy victory, with the 1979 Labour vote split fairly evenly between Douglas-Mann and Nicholas. With national attention focused on the unpredictable result, none of the independent candidates could make an impact, and the National Front vote declined from the previous election.

It was a rare example of a governing party gaining an additional seat with a by-election victory. Merton, Mitcham and Morden was the first seat gained in a by-election by an incumbent government since 1960 at the Brighouse and Spenborough by-election. (The 1961 Bristol South East by-election was awarded to the Conservatives by an Election Court.) It was not until February 2017 that a governing party again gained a seat at a by-election, at the 2017 Copeland by-election. It was the last seat gained by the Conservatives at a by-election until the 2008 Crewe and Nantwich by-election.

The by-election was the first to see the incumbent party drop to third place since the 1958 Rochdale by-election, a situation which next occurred at the 1985 Brecon and Radnor by-election.

Rumbold held the seat until the 1997 general election, when it was retaken by Labour. Douglas-Mann stood for the seat again in the SDP colours at the 1983 general election, but was pushed into third place by Nicholas. Pearce later repudiated his views and became a Roman Catholic. The election proved to be one of Boaks' last, while Bardwaj stood in several further by-elections.

1982 Mitcham and Morden by-election
Party	Candidate	Votes	%	±%
Conservative	Angela Rumbold	13,306	43.4	−0.5
SDP	Bruce Douglas-Mann	9,032	29.4	+20.5
Labour	David Nicholas	7,475	24.4	−20.8
National Front	Joseph Pearce	547	1.8	−0.2
Independent Liberal	Edward Larkin	123	0.4	N/A
Ethnic Minority Candidate	Roy Sawh	84	0.3	N/A
Democratic Monarchist	Bill Boaks	66	0.2	N/A
COPS	Jitendra Bardwaj	22	0.1	N/A
Computer Democrat	Christopher Farnsworth	18	0.0	N/A
Majority		4,274	14.0	N/A
Turnout		30,673	48.5	−28.4
Registered electors		63,259		
Conservative gain from Labour		Swing	+10.2	
