= Colliers Wood =

Coordinates: 51.4191°N 0.1677°W

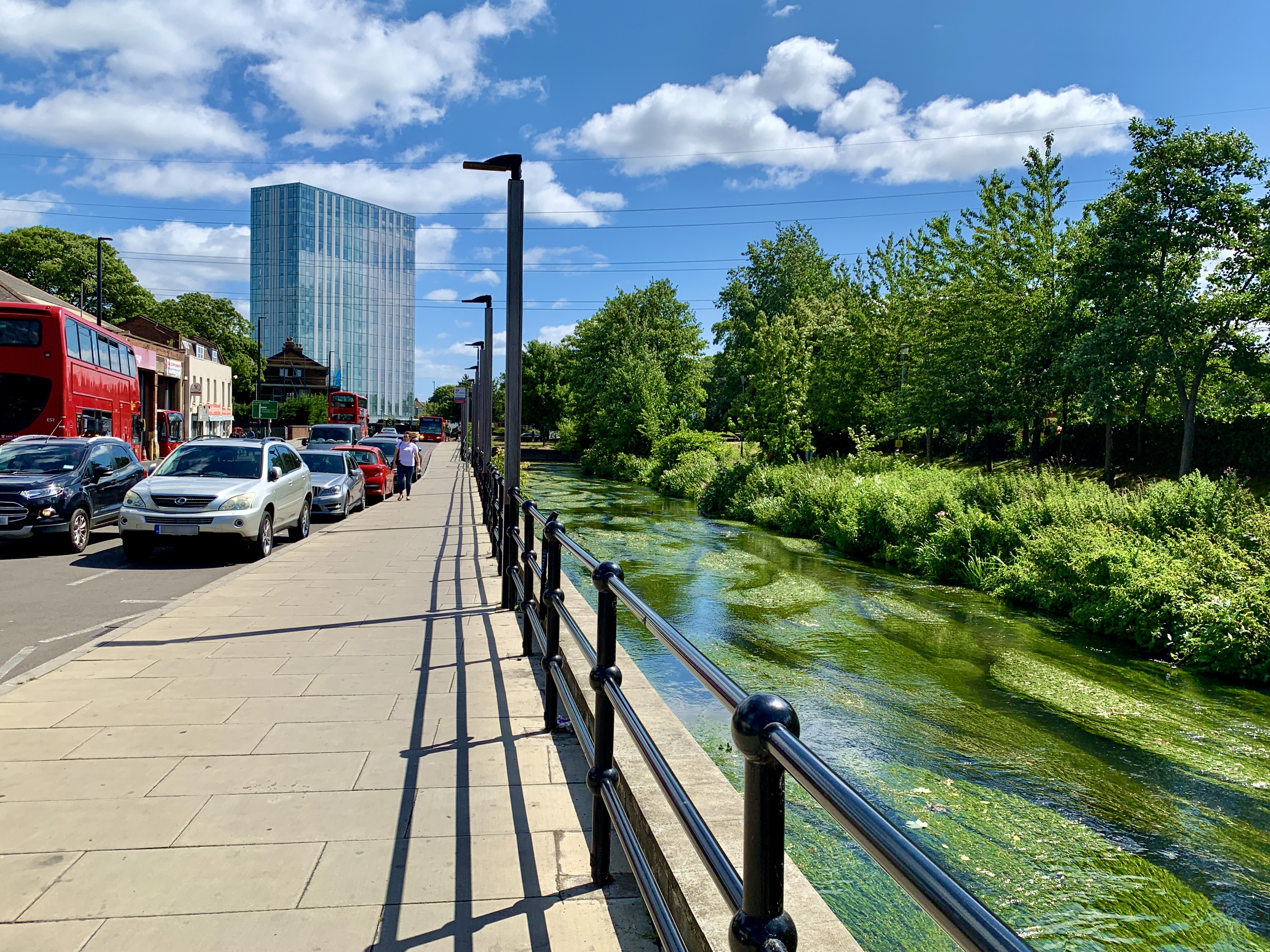
- The River Wandle at Merton High Street, with Colliers Wood Tower behind

- Location within Greater London
- OS grid reference: TQ275705
- London borough: Merton
- Ceremonial county: Greater London
- Region: London
- Country: England
- Sovereign state: United Kingdom
- Post town: London
- Postcode district: SW19
- Dialling code: 020
- Police: Metropolitan
- Fire: London
- Ambulance: London
- UK Parliament: Mitcham and Morden
- London Assembly: Merton and Wandsworth

Colliers Wood is an area in southwest London, England, in the London Borough of Merton. It is a mostly residential area, but has a busy high street around Colliers Wood tube station on London Underground's Northern line. The high street is part of the A24, a major road route roughly following the Northern Line, running from London through Tooting and other areas. The Colliers Wood ward had a population of 10,712 in 2011.

Colliers Wood shares its postcode district of SW19 with Wimbledon. It merges into Merton Abbey. Colliers Wood has three parks: a recreation ground, the National Trust-owned Wandle Park, which covers an area of approximately 11 acres (45,000 m^{2}), and the more informal Wandle Meadow Nature Park. Colliers Wood United F.C. is a semi-professional football club founded in Colliers Wood but now based in nearby New Malden.

== History ==
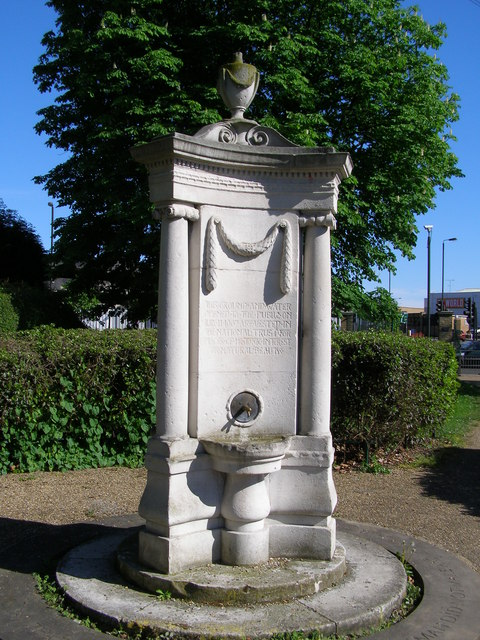
The Feeny Monument: memorial fountain inside Wandle Park

Colliers Wood takes its name from a wood that stood to the east of Colliers Wood High Street, approximately where Warren, Marlborough and Birdhurst Roads are now. Contemporary Ordnance Survey maps show that this wood remained at least until the 1870s but had been cleared for development by the mid-1890s.

The twelfth-century ruins of Merton Priory were considered by the Department of Culture, Media and Sport as a possible British candidate for World Heritage status. Henry VI was crowned king of England at Westminster Abbey in 1429, and king of France at Notre-Dame de Paris in 1431. He was reported to have been "crowned" at Merton Priory in 1437, but this was more of a 'crown-wearing' ceremony than a coronation. Similarly Queen Elizabeth II wears the Imperial State Crown at the State Opening of Parliament every year.

Among those educated at Merton Priory were Thomas Becket and Nicholas Breakspear, who was the only English Pope.

Close to Merton Priory is the market and heritage centre at Merton Abbey Mills, the former Liberty & Co. dyeworks on the bank of the River Wandle. The Wandle was reputed to have more mills per mile than any other river in the world, having 90 mills along its 11 mi length. William Morris, at the forefront of the Arts and Crafts Movement, located the Morris & Co. factory at the Merton Abbey Works after determining that the water of the Wandle was suitable for dyeing. The complex, on 7 acres (28,000 m^{2}), included several buildings and a dyeworks, and the various buildings were soon adapted for stained-glass production, textile printing, and fabric- and carpet-weaving. The works closed in Autumn 1940. The site is now operated by Sainsbury's Supermarkets Ltd. The site features a shared Sainsbury's & M&S complex (originally a SavaCentre opened on 28 February 1989 with 107,430 sq ft (9,981 m^{2}) of sales area, making it the largest hypermarket in the UK at the time of its opening).

The world's first public railway, the Surrey Iron Railway, which was initially horse-drawn, passed through Colliers Wood on its route from Croydon to Wandsworth, between 1803 and 1846. Before the merger with Merton, it was in the Municipal Borough of Mitcham.

In July 2010, the first of London's Cycle Superhighways opened, with a continuous bicycle lane known as CS7 originating in Southwark Bridge, in the centre of London, and terminating in Colliers Wood. The route was originally intended to continue to South Wimbledon.

== Demography ==
White British is the largest ethnic group as of the 2011 census at 38.5%. This is followed by Other White (19.2%), Other Asian (8.7%), Indians (5.5%), Pakistanis (5.2%) and Black Africans (4.3%).

50.2% of people living in Colliers Wood were born in England. The other most common countries of birth were Sri Lanka (4%), South Africa (3.8%), India (3%) and Pakistan (2.9%).

The largest religions in Colliers Wood are Christianity (49.9%), those of no religion (22.2%), Muslims (11.2%) and Hindus (7.3%).

== Colliers Wood Tower ==
Colliers Wood is visually dominated by the "Colliers Wood Tower", built in 1966. Originally named the "Lyon Tower", it was originally occupied as the headquarters of property company Ronald Lyon Holdings but has also been known as "The Vortex" and "Brown & Root House". The architects for the building were Bader and Miller. When being built, the tower reached the third storey before an error in construction was discovered and it was demolished to begin again.

It was voted the ugliest building in London in a 2006 BBC poll and one of the 12 ugliest in the UK in an early 2005 Channel 4 poll for its programme Demolition. The same BBC poll quoted an architect working for Golfrate Property Management, the current owners, as saying the building was due a make-over and new lease of life.

By 2009, the ground and first floor windows and doors had been boarded up, and green netting attached across each end to prevent falling debris causing injury to passers-by. Demolition of the adjacent spiral car park began in April 2010, but due to complications with an electrical substation was halted soon after, with half the car park still standing. But by June 2011 the car park had been demolished entirely.

A major renovation of the Tower began in 2014, to create a glass clad block of 150 rentable apartments, with commercial units to the ground floor. The renovation was finished by October 2017, with the building called Britannia Point.

In 2021 Criterion Capital submitted a planning application for two new towers on the south side of the existing tower. A petition against the towers has gathered over 500 signatures.

In 2022, The London Borough of Merton started emergency inspection of the building after footage revealed a glass panel had fallen from a residents window.

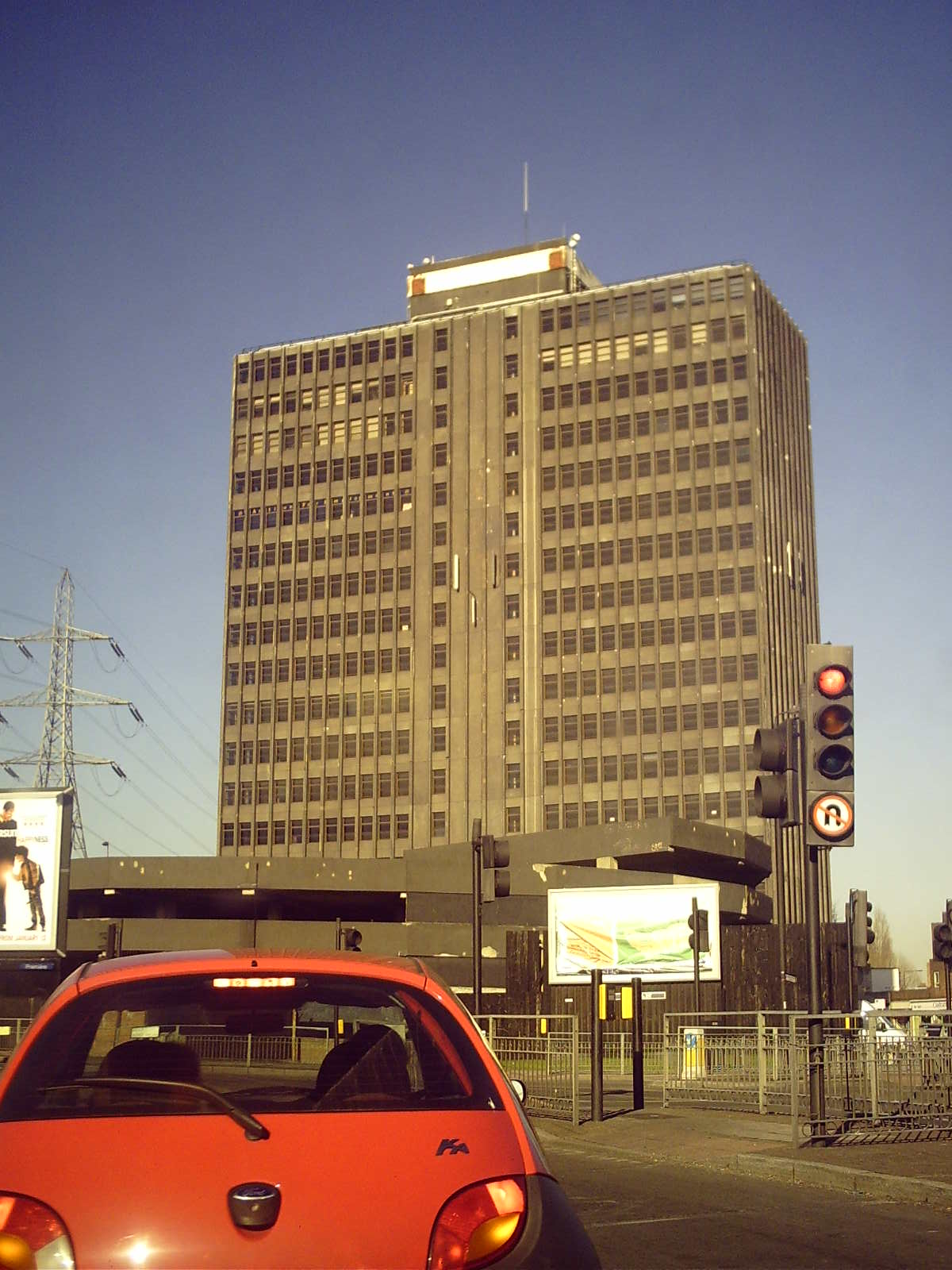
The Colliers Wood Tower

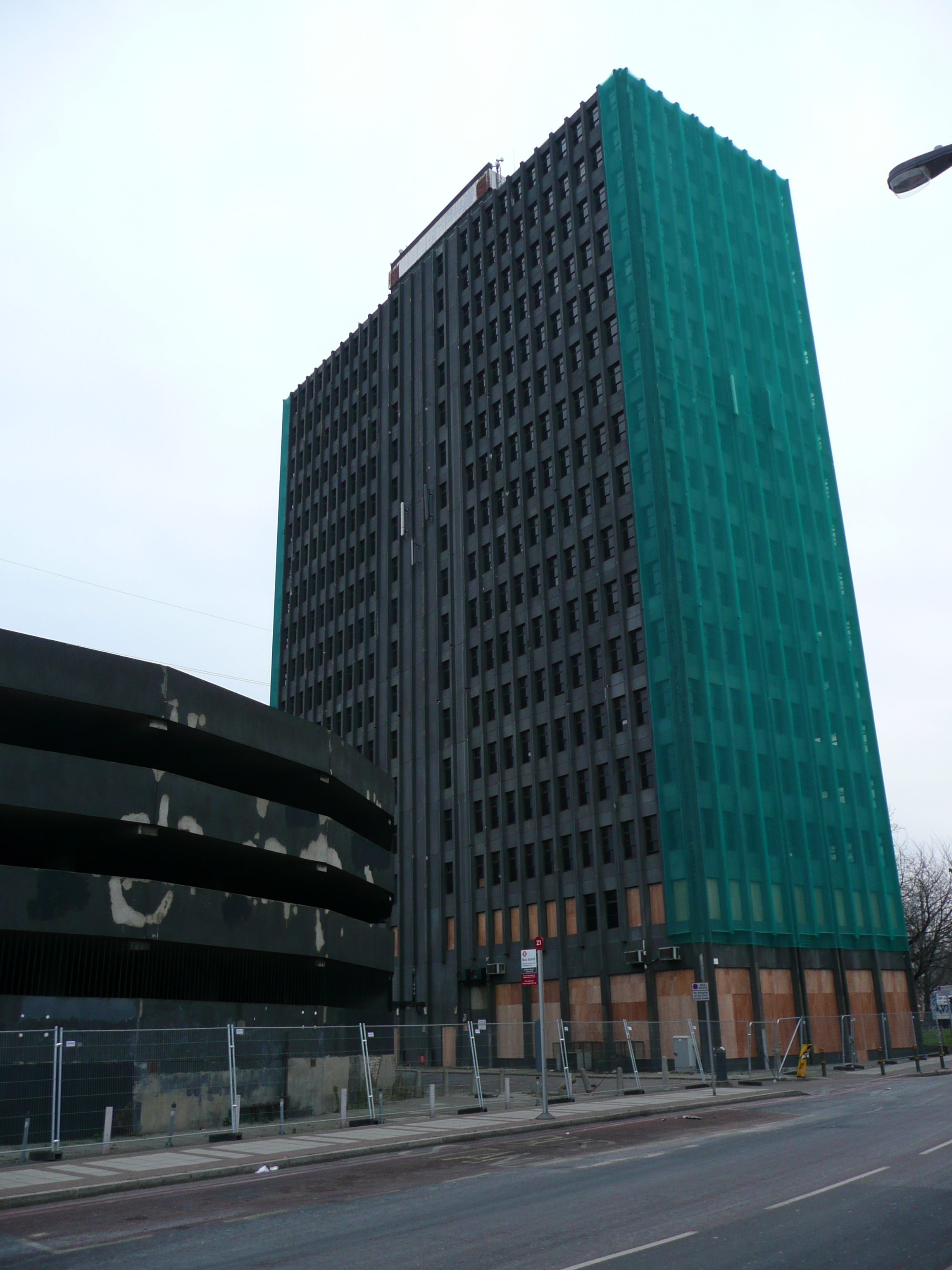
The Colliers Wood Tower - unoccupied

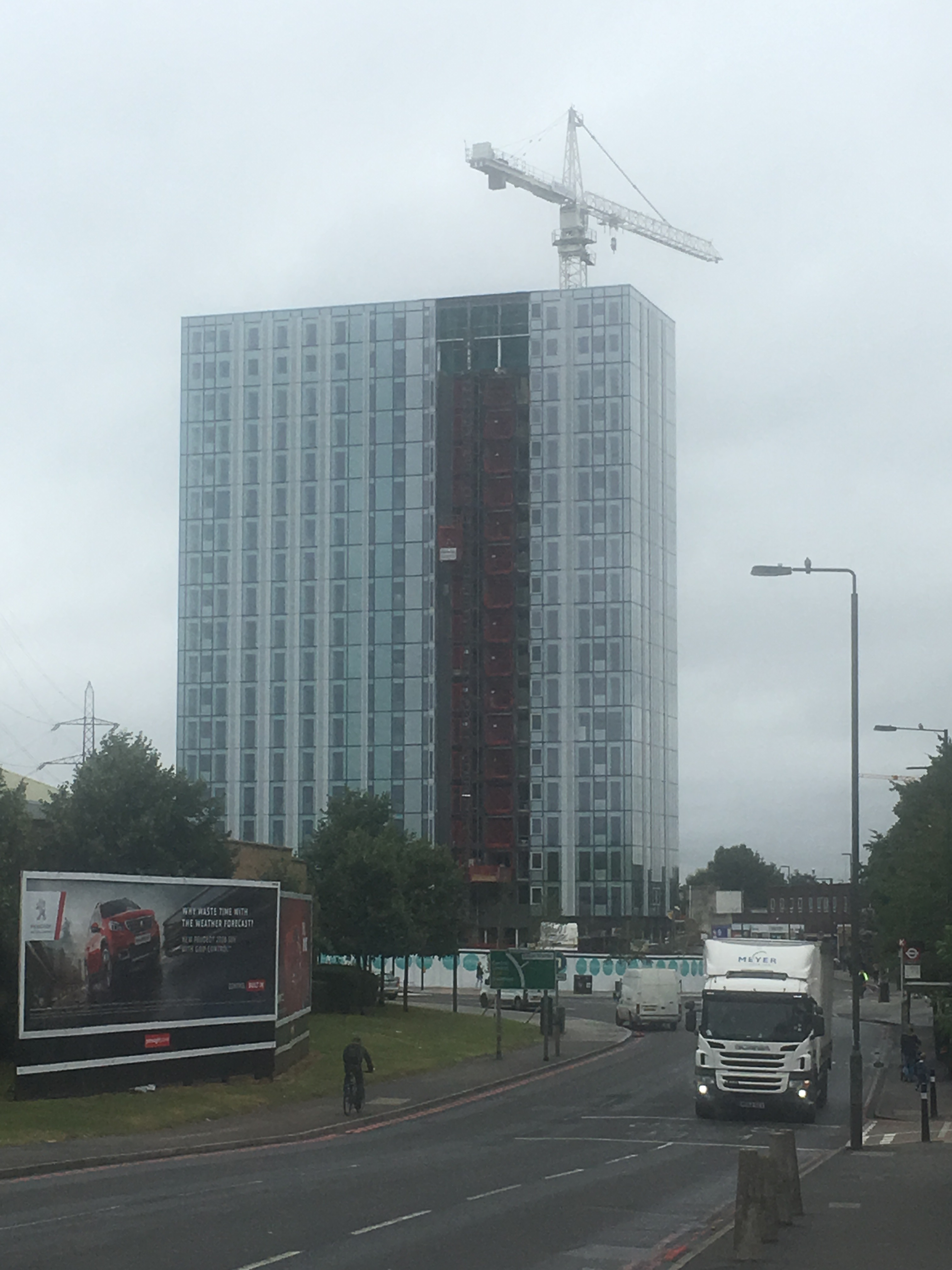
New cladding Summer 2016

== Culture ==
In 2006, local resident and ex-resident of Slough Keith Spears, having seen the BBC TV series Making Slough Happy, started the "Making Colliers Wood Happy!" initiative as a way of building community spirit to counteract the decline in neighbourliness in suburban areas. This has resulted in a lively programme of social activities for local residents, including a choir, a ukulele orchestra and an annual open gardens event.

Colliers Wood is represented in football by Colliers Wood United who play in the 10th tier of English football in the Combined Counties League Division One. The team however is based outside the area at Wibbandune Sports Ground in the Royal Borough of Kingston-upon-Thames.

== Governance ==
Colliers Wood is part of the Mitcham and Morden constituency for elections to the House of Commons of the United Kingdom.

Colliers Wood is part of the Colliers Wood ward for elections to Merton London Borough Council.
