= Belmont, Sutton =

Area of the London Borough of Sutton

Coordinates: 51.343°N 0.202°W

Belmont
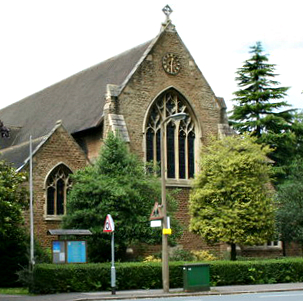
- St. John's Church (C of E), Queens Road, Belmont, Sutton

- Outer streets of Belmont are mostly avenues lined with set-back houses with gardens such as Cotswold Road, which has views on a clear day of parts of Central London.

- Location within Greater London
- Population: 12,082 (2024 official estimate. Ward)
- OS grid reference: TQ253620
- London borough: Sutton
- Ceremonial county: Greater London
- Region: London
- Country: England
- Sovereign state: United Kingdom
- Post town: SUTTON
- Postcode district: SM2
- Dialling code: 020
- Police: Metropolitan
- Fire: London
- Ambulance: London
- UK Parliament: Sutton and Cheam
- London Assembly: Croydon and Sutton

Belmont is a village in the London Borough of Sutton, at the edge of South London, England. It is mostly east of the broad arterial road Belmont Rise (Note: The A217 road) and touches the mainly wooded landscape of Banstead Downs and the expansive, large houses neighbourhood of Cheam Warren (Note: Known by some residents still as Cuddington for its south-western two-thirds and Howell Hill as to the north-west corner.) which straddle London's border with Surrey. Predominantly low-rise and containing a large specialist hospital and research centre, on its other sides it is contiguous with Sutton (Note: To a lesser extent than Cheam, the spring line settlement of which it was for centuries (until its development) a part) and to the east with Carshalton Beeches. (Note: Sometimes called Carshalton Downs) Belmont is a decisively suburban mixture of a range of housing in size mostly in private ownership, with small commercial/retail public-facing businesses. (Note: Predominantly retail, automotive and 'high street' services such as salons, estate agents etc.) It is centred around 11 miles (18 km) south-southwest of Charing Cross.

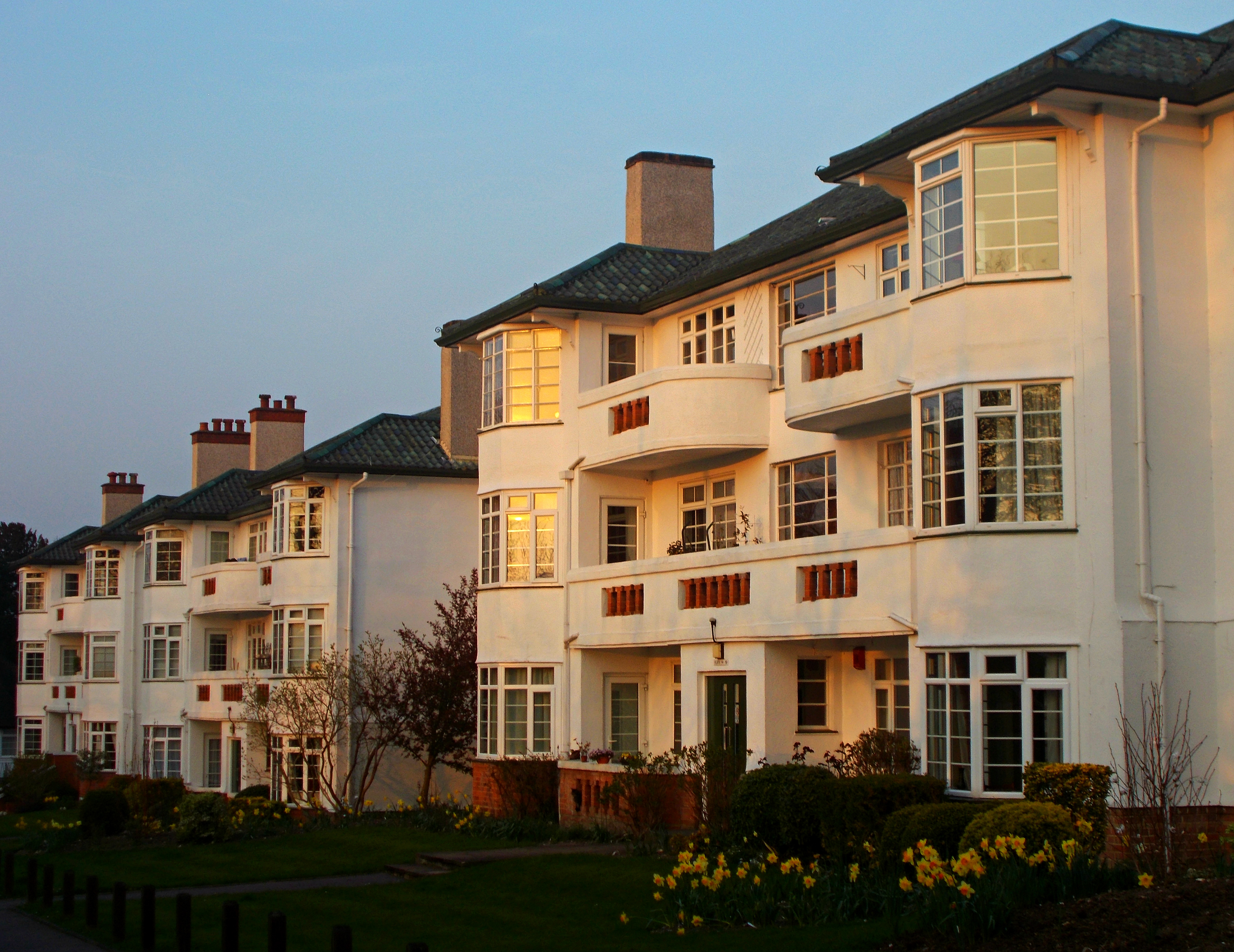
The Chilterns art deco apartments, Brighton Road, in most re-drawings made of the Belmont council ward to date but south end of Christ Church, Sutton (older and more permanent) ecclesiastical parish.

== History ==
Map of circa 1875, coloured of the identities (parishes) local land and residents had.

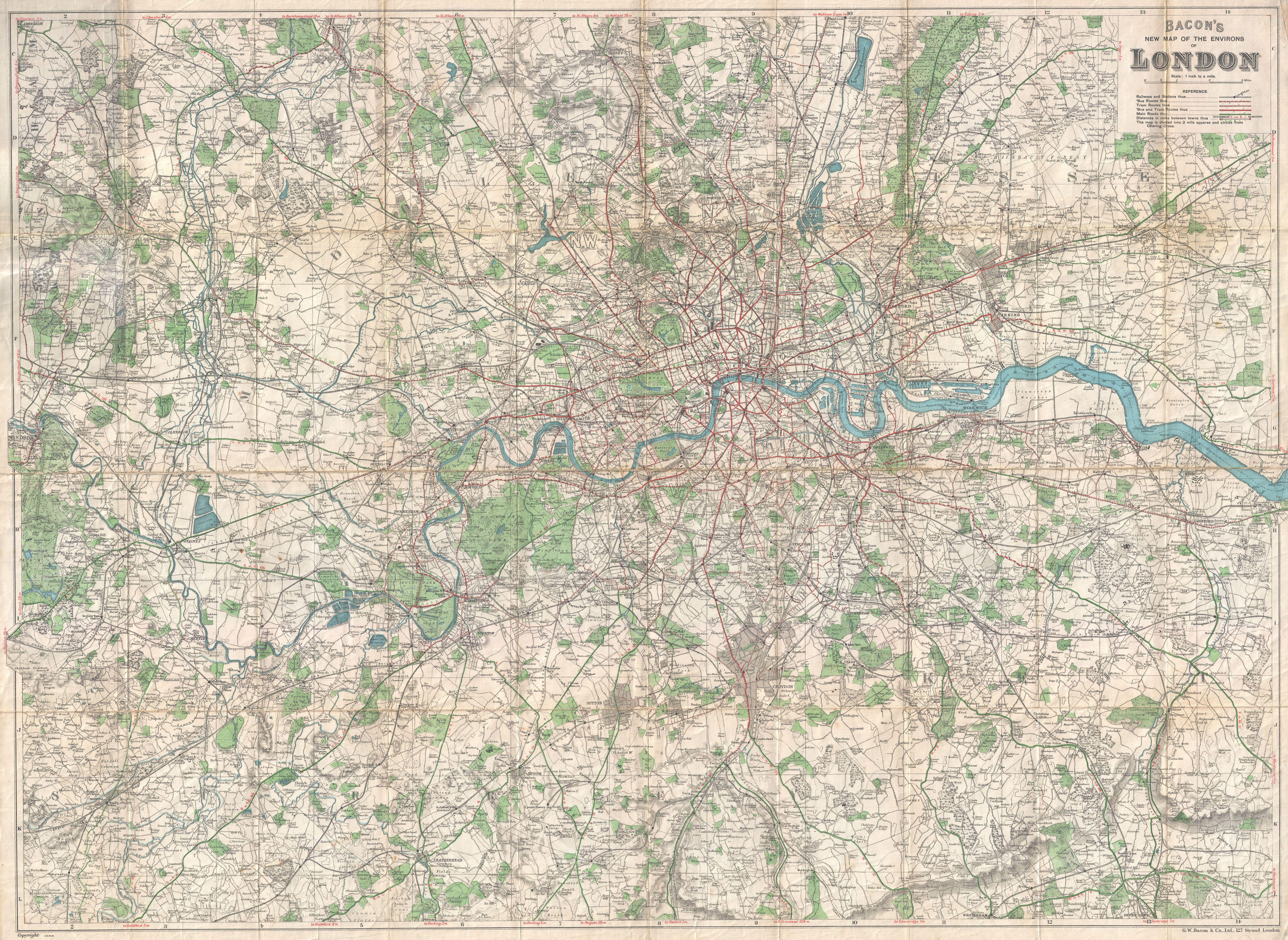
Extract from Bacon Pocket Map of London (1920)

Belmont did not exist until the late 19th century; the area is on slopes above miles of east-west, pre-historic spring line settlement. Belmont railway station opened in May 1865 as 'California Station', named after the large California Arms public house which remains trading the east side of Brighton Road which was built by John Gibbons in approximately 1858. The station has been 'Belmont' since 1875, and the name was attached to the village that quite rapidly developed, predominantly in the form of privately owned housing. The original pub was heavily damaged by German bombing in the Second World War. The new building, built on the site in 1955, was known as "The California" later changed to 'The Belmont', but in 2014, under new management, reverted to its original name of 'The California'. Belmont Rise as a modest bypass (residential road) for Brighton Road, to avoid Sutton Town centre on any north-south route, was built in the early 20th century and lies in what was Cheam Warren.

St. John's Church (C of E and Methodist) dates from 1914, and stands in Queens Road, near the end of the area's small (short) High Street ("Station Road"). The nearby Methodist congregation moved in to share the building in the 1980s, and the worship and administration of the church have been joint since the mid-1990s.

=== Banstead Hospital and the emergence of Belmont ===
The village of Belmont strongly owed its first phase of development to the presence of Banstead Asylum. In the far north of the sprawling parish of Banstead, the asylum was much closer to the village and railway station of Belmont than those of Banstead. The site is now occupied by HM Prison High Down.

=== Belmont Hospital and the South Metropolitan District School ===
Belmont Hospital was a psychiatric hospital. It closed and was demolished in the 1980s. The site is now occupied by the 'Belmont Heights' housing development, which is situated to the west of Brighton Road, to the north of Belmont village. Belmont Hospital opened after the Second World War. The premises had previously fulfilled a number of different institutional purposes. For example, during World War II it was used as an emergency hospital for military and civilian casualties, including psychiatric cases. The oldest buildings on the site, built in the early 1850s, had originally been a large Poor Law residential 'district' school belonging to the South Metropolitan Schools District. This institution catered for pauper children from several parishes in south-east London. Along with its nearby annex site, built in 1884 in Cotswold Road (formerly Banstead Road), this establishment closed in 1902. The premises at both sites were then acquired by the Metropolitan Asylums Board. Some of the buildings of the Cotswold Road site still exist.

== Governance ==
Belmont is part of the Sutton and Cheam constituency for elections to the House of Commons of the United Kingdom.

Belmont is all of the Belmont ward for elections to Sutton London Borough Council.

== Public institutions ==
- The Royal Marsden Hospital is a specialist cancer treatment hospital. This is one of two sites of a single foundation trust bearing its name. The original buildings on the site were first used as the Banstead Road branch of the South Metropolitan District School, which was a school for children of workhouse inmates across much of south London for its own pool of workhouses (district). In the 1890s, girls were kept at the Banstead Road site and boys were kept at a site in Brighton Road, built in 1851. The latter became Belmont workhouse and Belmont Psychiatric Hospital, before being demolished in the 1980s. The Banstead Road site later became a sanatorium, before the southern half of the site was acquired by Royal Marsden in 1962.
- The Institute of Cancer Research is a public research institute and university on two London sites specialised in oncology. It was founded in 1909 as a research department of the Royal Marsden Hospital. It established its Belmont (also sometimes named Sutton) campus in 1956. It joined the University of London in 2003.
- Sutton Hospital

== Green Space ==
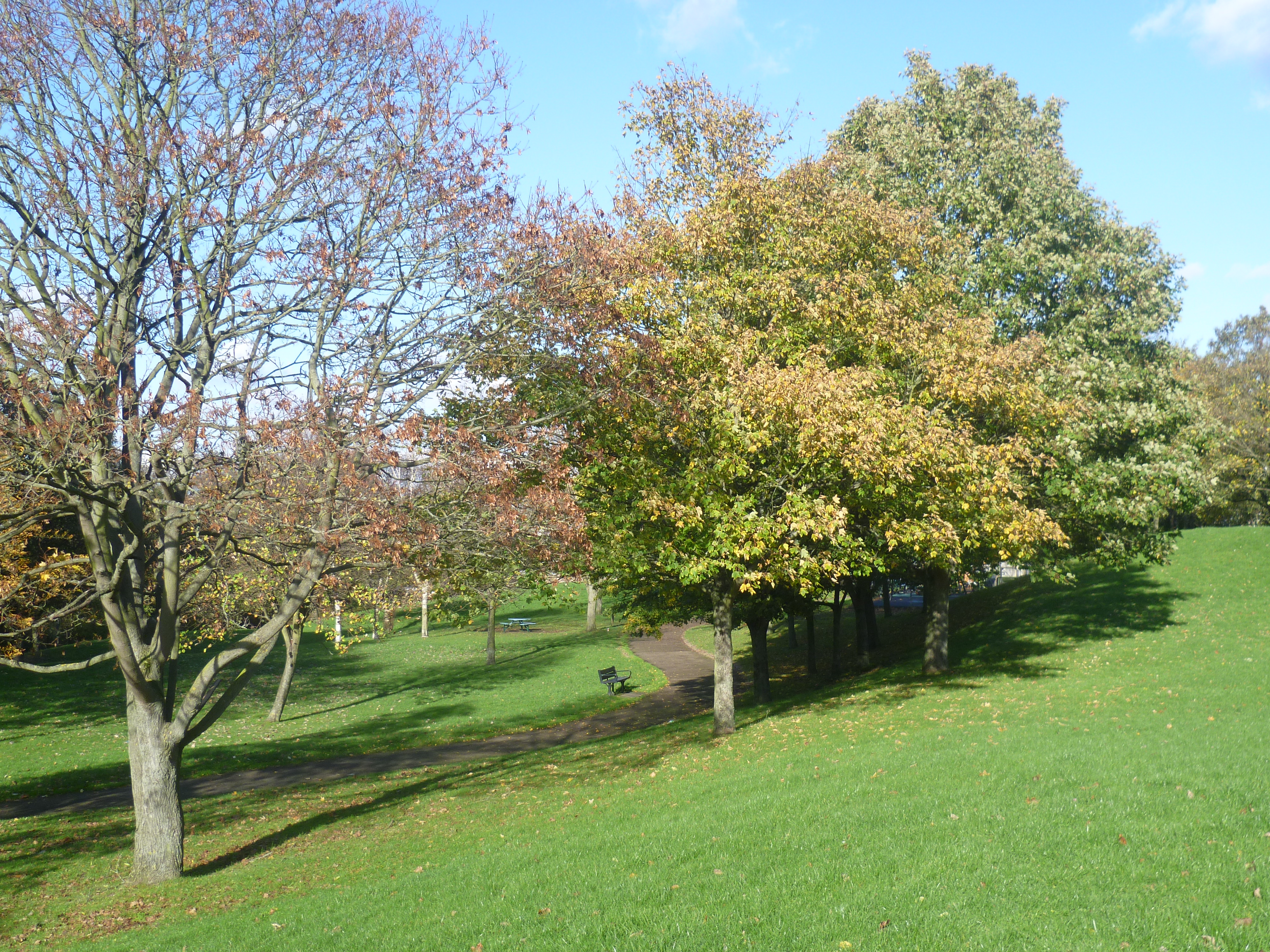
Belmont Park

In addition to Belmont Park (pictured), Belmont contains two Local Nature Reserves.

- Cuddington Meadows is a Grade I Site of Borough Importance for Nature Conservation. The site was shown as two enclosures on the open Banstead Downs on an early nineteenth century map, and it was later part of Walnut Tree Farm, which became Cuddington Hospital in 1897. The hospital closed in 1984, and in the late 1990s the land was transferred to Sutton Council to be managed for nature conservation. It is mainly chalk grassland with some scrub. Its most important feature is a variety of unusual flowering plants, including greater knapweed, lady's bedstraw and field scabious.
- Belmont Pastures is a Grade II Site of Borough Importance for Nature Conservation. It is a long narrow triangle north of Belmont railway station. It is an old meadow which formerly belonged to Belmont Hospital.

South of Belmont is Banstead Downs, which extends for between 1 kilometre (0.62 mi) and 1.5 kilometres (0.93 mi) to Banstead, Surrey. It is a large Site of Special Scientific Interest, covering 430 acres (170 ha). Banstead Golf Course occupies some of its western slopes (east of Cuddington Golf Course) which are not included in the acreage figure; slopes which continue through Belmont fairly uniformly down from south to north.

== Economy ==
Station Road is the main commercial street of Belmont Village, containing a range of mainly independent shops and restaurants. It runs for about a quarter of a mile from Belmont Station in the east to St John's Church in the west. One mile to the north lies the larger economic centre of Sutton.

== Nearest places ==
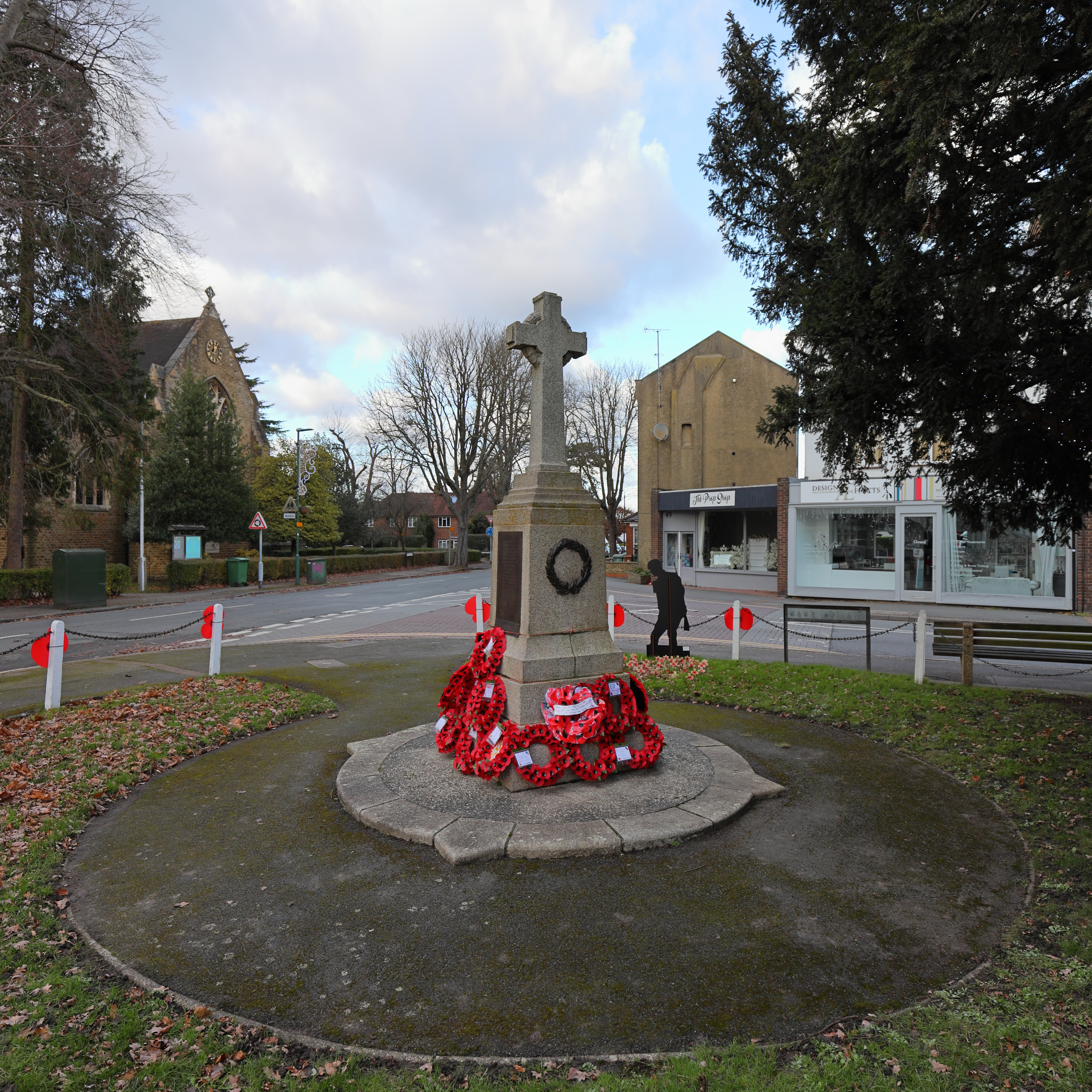
Belmont War Memorial, at the west end of Station Road faces St John's Church, a daughter church of the medieval church of Sutton

- Sutton to the north
- Cheam's part of Howell Hill to the west
- Banstead, Surrey to the south
- Carshalton Beeches to the east

== Transport ==
Belmont railway station is on the Sutton to Epsom Downs branchline and the London Victoria to Epsom Downs line. It is part of the Sutton & Mole Valley Line services of the Southern rail operating company, and is in London fare zone 5. TfL buses also run in this area.

== Former residents ==
- David Bellamy (1933–2019), botanist, author and academic.
- Robin Hull (1905-1960), music critic
- James Hunt (1947–1993), World Formula One motor-racing champion 1976.
- Lord Judd (1935-2021) former director of Oxfam. As Frank Judd he was MP for constituencies in Portsmouth from 1966 to 1979.
- Don Lusher (1923–2006), trombonist and jazz band leader
- Lord Ritchie-Calder (1906–1982), journalist and environment expert
- Lionel Tertis (1876–1975), viola-player
- Barry Wordsworth (born in Cheam 1948), orchestral conductor – music director.

== Further reading (local history) ==
- Belmont: A Century Ago by Roland Sparkes, published December 2009. Paperback. ISBN 978-0-9563424-0-9. . This is first book dedicated to the history of the village. The introductory chapter provides a resume of Belmont's history and development in the Victorian era and the early 20th century.
- Articles by local historian Roland Sparkes for the Belmont Local History group (established 2009). E.g. Belmont: 1865 – A description of the Belmont area as it existed in 1865, and Dr Carl Warburg, his Belmont laboratory, and his famous fever drug.
- Sutton Guardian newspaper – heritage page articles and features.
- Sutton Scene (London Borough of Sutton's official newsletter), Oct/Nov 2009 edition. Feature on Belmont.
- Two booklets have been produced about the history of Belmont's churches, both now out of print: (i) Splendid the Heritage: the story of Belmont and its Methodist Church (Craig, 1965); and (ii) A Village Church: the story of the first 75 years of St John’s with Belmont Methodists (Reed, 1992).
- The Brighton road; the classic highway to the south by Harper, Charles George, 1863-1943 Page 159 refers to the position of Belmont on the road between London and Brighton and the 1796 marking of "Little Hell" on the maps.
