= Epsom Downs Branch =

Railway line in southern England

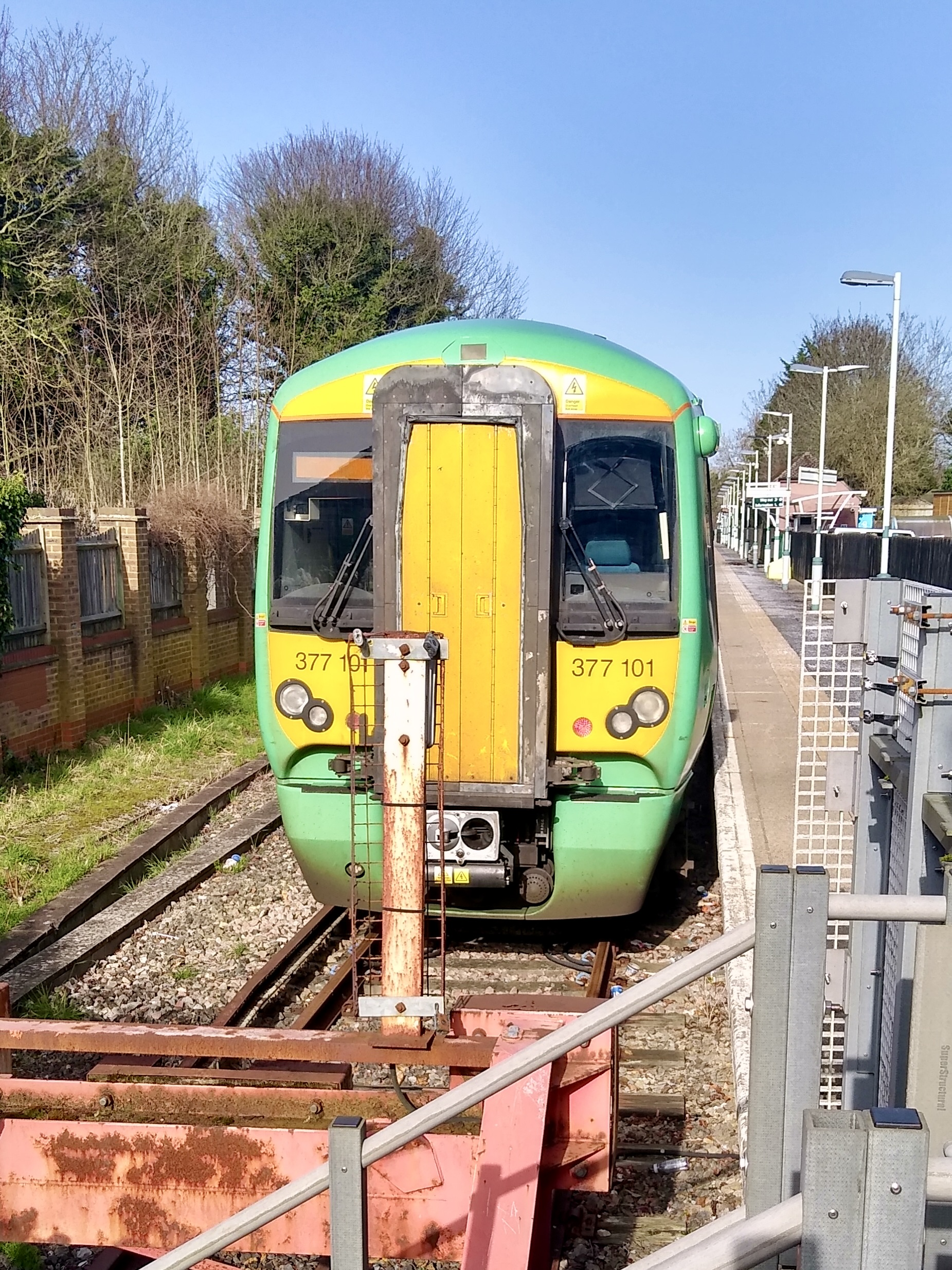
- A Class 377 unit at Epsom Downs station in 2026

Overview
- Status: Operational
- Owner: Network Rail
- ELR: NFE
- Locale: Greater London, Surrey
- Termini: Sutton; Epsom Downs

Service
- Type: Commuter rail, Suburban rail
- System: National Rail
- Operator: Southern
- Rolling stock: Class 377 "Electrostar"

History
- Opened: 22 May 1865

Technical
- Track gauge: 1,435 mm (4 ft 8 1/2 in) standard gauge
Route map
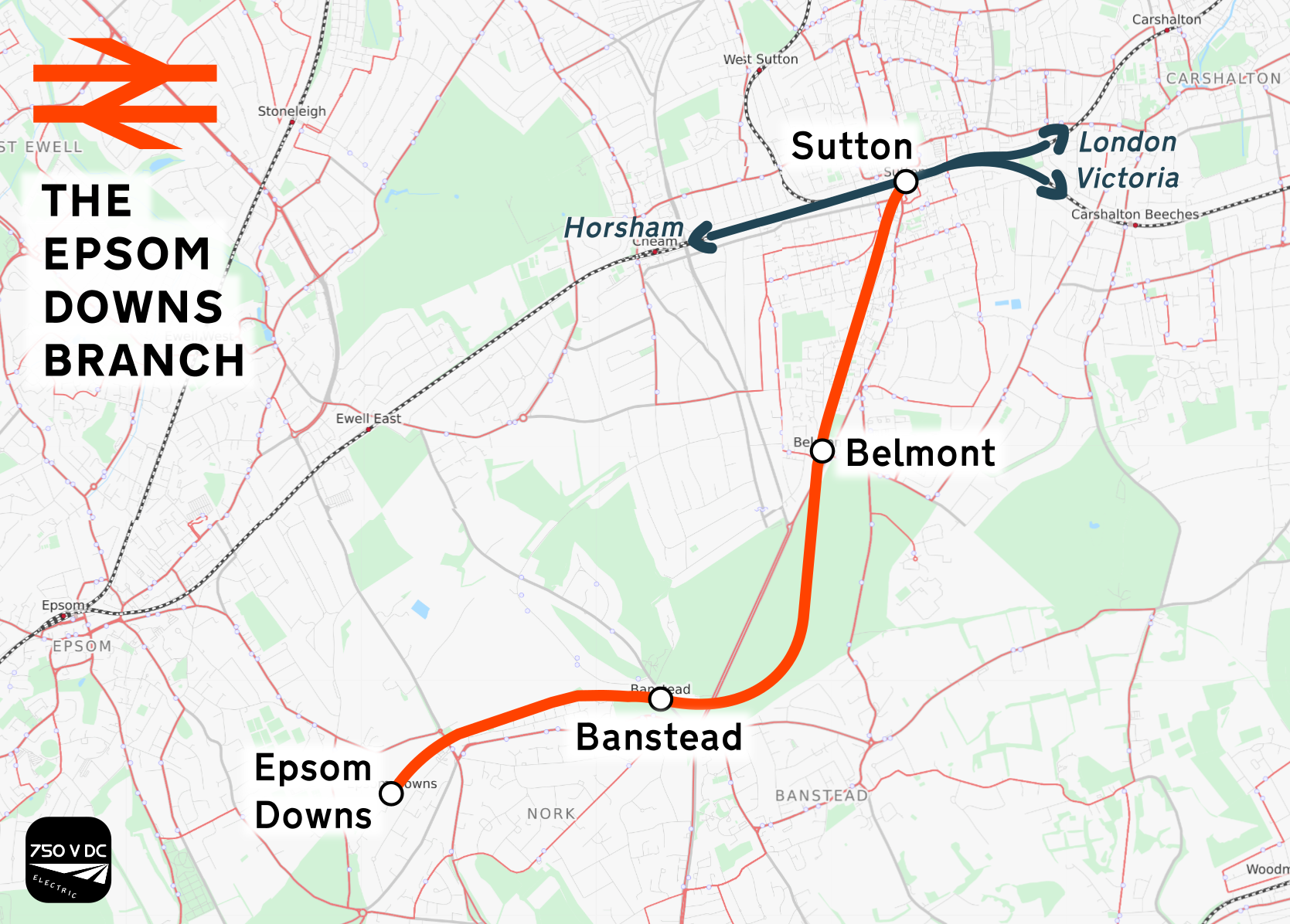

The Epsom Downs Branch is a 3-mile-65-chain (6.1 km) railway line in Greater London and Surrey, England. It runs from Sutton to its southern terminus at Epsom Downs, with intermediate stations at Belmont and Banstead. With the exception of the northernmost 39 ch (780 m), the branch is single track. All stations are managed by Southern, which operates all passenger trains. Most services run between Epsom Downs and London Victoria via Selhurst.

The line was primarily built for racegoers attending Epsom Downs Racecourse and was promoted by the Banstead and Epsom Downs Railway. Authorisation was granted by parliament in July 1862 and construction was completed by the London, Brighton and South Coast Railway. The branch opened as a double track line on 22 May 1865. It was electrified by the Southern Railway using the 750 V DC third-rail system in 1928 and the majority of the branch has operated as a single line since 1981.

== Infrastructure and services ==
The Epsom Downs branch line is a railway line in Surrey and Greater London, England. It runs for 3 miles 65 ch (6.1 km) from Sutton station to its southern terminus, Epsom Downs station, 18 mi 60 ch (30.2 km) down the line from London Bridge via West Croydon. The northernmost 39 ch (780 m) is double track, including the platforms at Sutton, but the rest of the line was singled in the early 1980s. The maximum speed permitted on the branch is 60 mph (97 km/h) and the line is electrified using the 750 V DC third-rail system. Signalling is controlled from Three Bridges and Track Circuit Block is in operation. The steepest gradient on the line, on the approach to Belmont from the north, is 1 in 58.

All four stations on the line are managed by Southern, which operates all services. Sutton and Belmont stations are in Zone 5 of the London fare zones; Banstead and Epsom Downs are in Zone 6. Sutton has four operational platforms, of which only two are connected to the branch; the other three stations have one platform each. (Note: The platform at Belmont station is the shortest on the line with a length of 159.7 m (524 ft), but it will be extended to 205 m (673 ft) by August 2027 as part of the Belmont Rail Frequency Enhancement project.) The off-peak service pattern is two trains per hour in each direction between Epsom Downs and London Victoria via Selhurst. Off-peak trains from Epsom Downs typically reach Sutton on the Brighton Main Line in around nine minutes and arrive at London Victoria in about an hour.

Stations on the Epsom Downs branch line (ordered from north to south)
| Station | Distance from London Bridge via West Croydon | Number of platforms | Opening date | Original name | Ref. |
|---|---|---|---|---|---|
| Sutton | 14 mi 75 ch (24.0 km) | 4 (2 for branch) | 10 May 1847 | | |
| Belmont | 16 mi 1 ch (25.8 km) | 1 | 22 May 1865 | California | |
| Banstead | 17 mi 40 ch (28.2 km) | 1 | 22 May 1865 | | |
| Epsom Downs | 18 mi 60 ch (30.2 km) | 1 | 22 May 1865 | | |

== History ==
=== Proposal and authorisation ===
The earliest horse races on Epsom Downs are thought to have been held during the reign of James I, in the 17th century. The first formal races were run on an uphill course from Carshalton and were primarily a test of stamina rather than speed. The Oaks was established in 1779 and The Derby was first run the following year.

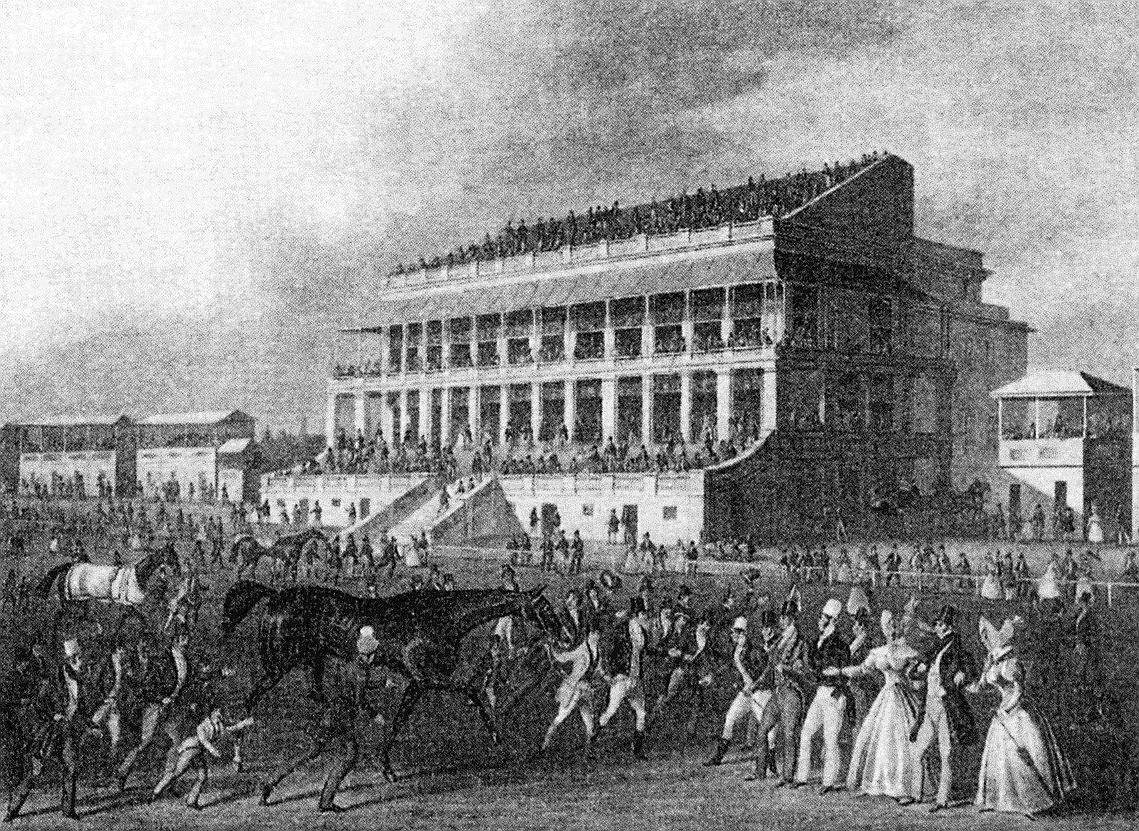
Epsom Grandstand in the 1830s

The first railway to be used by racegoers was the London-Woking section of the South West Main Line, which opened in May 1838. The nearest station to Epsom was Kingston (now Surbiton), an 8 mi (13 km) walk from the racecourse. On Derby Day that year, Nine Elms station, the temporary London terminus, was overwhelmed with around 5,000 people intending to catch the train to Surbiton. In 1857, the London, Brighton and South Coast Railway (LBSCR) opened a line to Epsom Town and, in 1859, the London and South Western Railway (LSWR) opened its own line from London to a separate station at Epsom.

Although Epsom was now served by two railway companies, each with its own station, racegoers were still required to walk around 1 mi (1.6 km) to the course. The Banstead and Epsom Downs Railway (BEDR) was formed to promote a 4 mi (6.4 km) branch from the existing LBSCR station at Sutton to a southern terminus close to the racecourse. The LBSCR indicated its provisional support and the Banstead and Epsom Downs Railway Act 1862 (25 & 26 Vict. c. clviii) giving authorisation for the new line was granted on 17 July 1862.

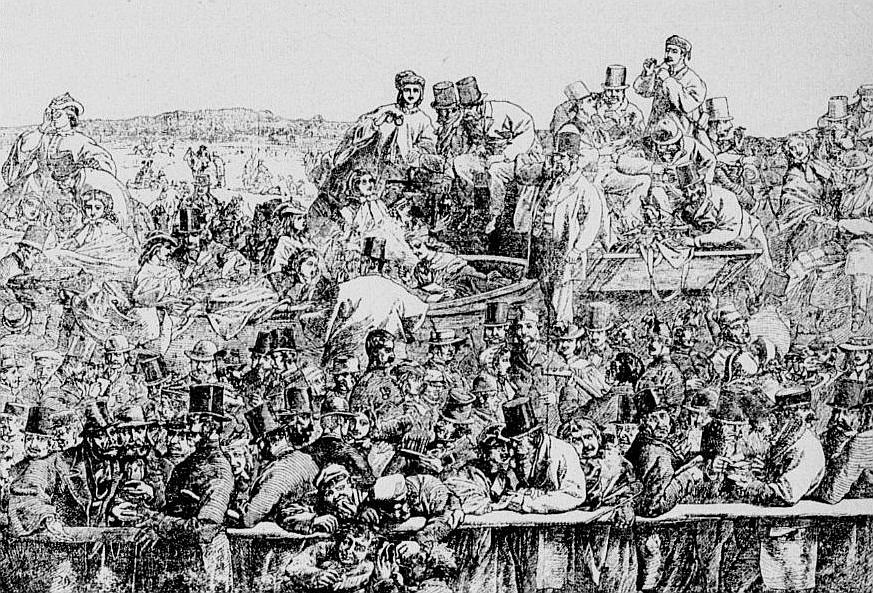
Racegoers at the 1860 Epsom Derby

The BEDR began to appoint contractors to build the line, but errors made by the inexperienced board resulted in contracts being drawn up improperly. The board expelled several directors, some of whom served writs on the company. Before agreeing terms to operate trains on the branch, the LBSCR insisted that the southern terminus should be built closer to the racecourse. However, attempts to relocate Epsom Downs station from its planned site were vigorously opposed by the Epsom Grand Stand Association and John Briscoe, the freeholder of the required land. By late 1863, the BEDR was in severe difficulties and the LBSCR offered to take over the company and to complete the line. The amalgamation was authorised by the London, Brighton and South Coast Railway (Additional Powers) Act 1864 (27 & 28 Vict. c. cccxiv) on 29 July 1864.

=== Opening ===
The branch opened between Sutton and Epsom Downs on 22 May 1865. The line was double track from the outset and the intermediate stations opened on the same day. Two new platforms, on a tight curve with a radius of 12 ch (240 m), were built at Sutton to serve the branch. The southern terminus had nine platforms and was designed to handle large volumes of passengers and trains on racedays. During the 1865 Epsom Derby period, 70,000 people travelled on the branch, but outside of racedays, traffic was very light. In 1892, the site of the terminus was described as "an absolute wilderness and the most god-forsaken place in the world" and it was alleged that only 20–30 passengers used it on a normal day. In the 1890s, the annual surplus over working expenses on the branch (taken over the year as a whole, including racedays) barely exceeded £200.

The initial passenger service was 14 trains each way between Sutton and Epsom Downs on weekdays and four each way on Saturdays, with a typical journey time of around 15 minutes. Trains were hauled by a locomotive based at West Croydon and the passenger carriages were berthed at Sutton. The first records of goods services on the line are from the 1872 timetables and it is thought that the yards at Banstead and Belmont opened around 1880. (Note: Belmont goods yard was moved from the north side of the Brighton Road to the south side in 1889.) No goods yard was provided at Epsom Downs.

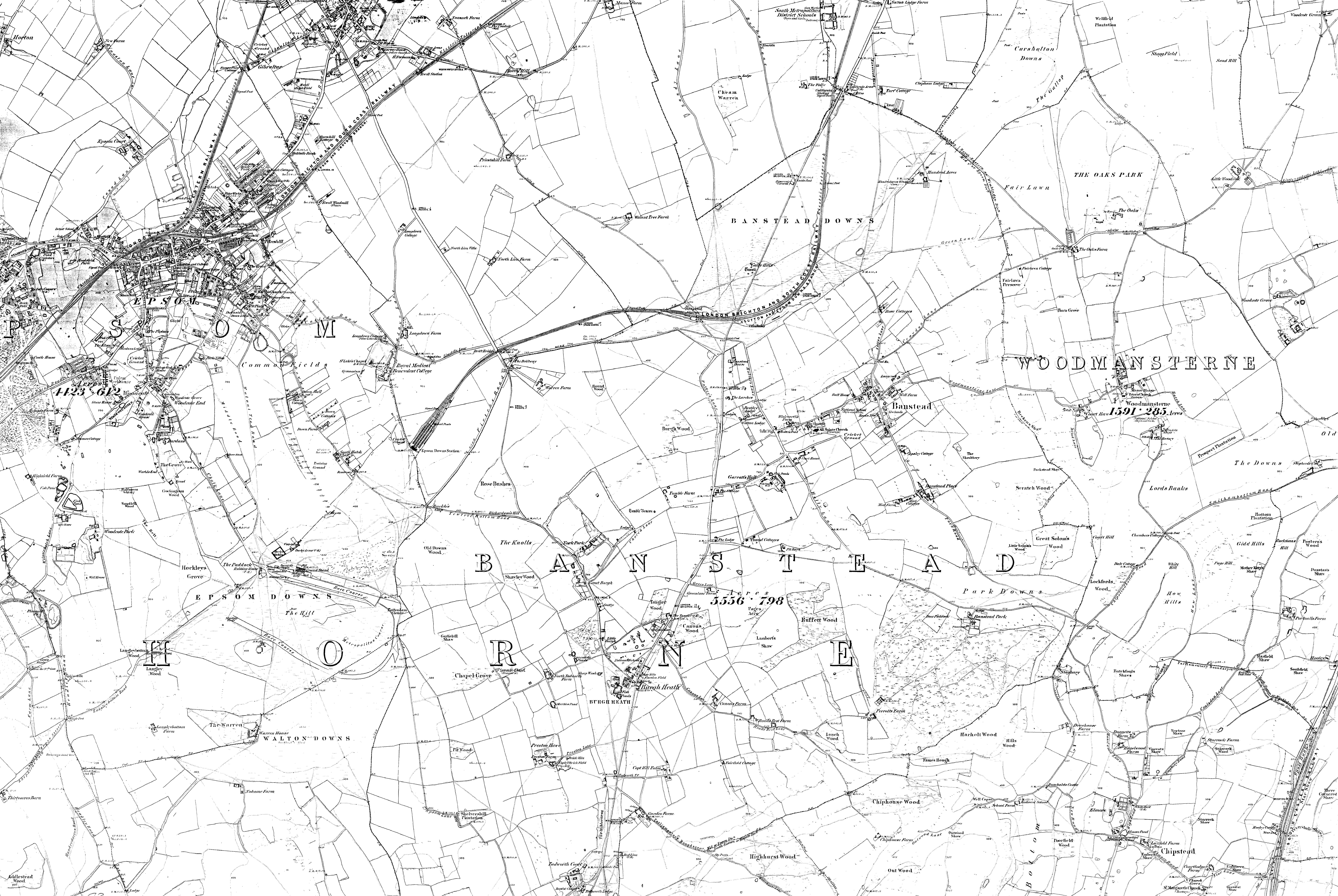
The southern part of the line in the early 1870s, showing the stations at California (now Belmont), Banstead and Epsom Downs.

It is unclear how the branch was originally signalled. Until 1874, with the exception of racedays, only one train was allowed on the line at any one time. A signal box was opened at Belmont around 1877, and a new box opened at Epsom Downs in May 1879, to increase the capacity of the branch for racedays. An intermediate signal box, between Banstead and Belmont, was opened in 1901, but was only used on racedays, and a box opened at Banstead in 1903.

When it opened in May 1865, Belmont station was called "California". The name was taken from a nearby public house that had been owned by a man who had returned from the gold rush with some money. Owing to confusion on the part of goods consignors, the station was given its current name on 1 October 1875. The settlement that subsequently grew up in the surrounding area, took its name from the renamed station.

=== 20th century ===
Railmotors were introduced to the Epsom Downs branch line in June 1906. These push-pull trains consisted of an A1 class tank engine coupled to a type of passenger carriage, known as a balloon trailer. The train would be driven from the locomotive in one direction and, in the other, from a driving position at the front of the carriage. Initially these services ran from West Croydon to Belmont, but from October 1909, they were used on the full length of the branch. By the end of that year, there were 37 return railmotor workings on weekdays on the line – around a third ran to Epsom Downs, but the majority terminated short at either Banstead or Belmont. D1 class tank engines started to operate push-pull trains on the branch from June 1914, when the number of weekday services was increased to 41.

Electrification of the line from West Croydon to Sutton, using a 6,600 V AC overhead line system, began in 1922 and was completed on 1 April 1925. Although services to Epsom Downs remained steam-hauled, a short section of the northern end of the branch was electrified, to allow terminating electric trains to shunt between platforms at Sutton. The majority of services between London and Sutton via West Croydon were operated by electric trains. As a result, the Epsom Downs branch was mostly run as a self-contained shuttle, with only a few services running through to the capital at peak times.

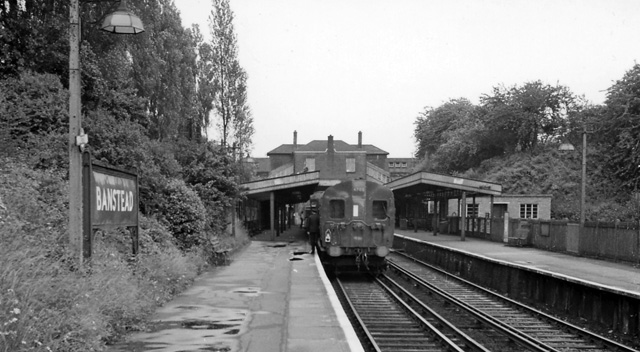
Banstead station in 1961

With the formation of the Southern Railway in 1923, a change in policy was announced, with the replacement of the LBSCR overhead AC system by third-rail DC electrification. A conversion programme began in 1925, the first phase of which included the electrification of the Epsom Downs line. In preparation for the new timetable, the platforms at Belmont and Banstead were lengthened for 8-coach trains. (Note: Only six of the nine platforms at Epsom Downs were electrified.) Electric trains began running on the branch on 17 June 1928. Services operated to London Bridge via West Croydon and ran up to three times per hour at peak times, with two trains per hour on weekdays in the off-peak. Electric services between Epsom Downs and London Victoria began on 4 May 1930. Electrification stimulated housebuilding in the local area and the Great Burgh and Nork Park estates were sold for development in the early 1930s. Annual passenger numbers more than doubled in eight years: from 329,779 in 1927 to 859,794 in 1935.

During the World Wars, the area around Epsom Downs was used by the army and traffic on the branch increased as a result. During the Second World War, civilian passenger services were reduced to one per hour in each direction, to accommodate military trains. In 1940, the lineside south of Banstead was fortified with anti-tank obstacles and pillboxes. A bomb destroyed the buildings on the down platform at Belmont on 11 October 1940 and the track between Banstead and Epsom Downs was damaged on 28 May 1941.

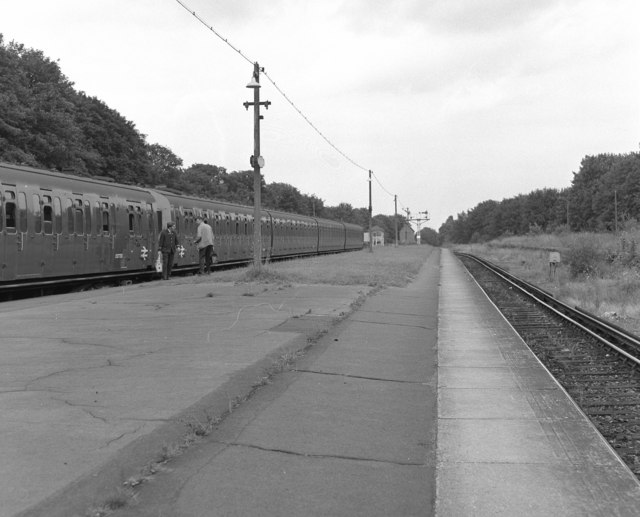
Epsom Downs station in July 1979

There was a decline in traffic on the Epsom Downs branch between the 1960s and early 1990s. The goods yard at Belmont closed on 6 January 1969 and the signal box at the station closed on 21 December the same year. On 1 May 1972, the terminus at Epsom Downs was reduced to two platforms. Stationmasters were removed from the southernmost three stations, which came under the control of a manager based at Sutton on 25 March 1973.

Epsom Downs signal box was damaged beyond economic repair in a fire on 16 November 1981. A system of emergency working was introduced, in which a shuttle service between Epsom Downs and Sutton was run with one train on the up (northbound) track. Over the course of the next eleven months, the down line was prepared for permanent single-line working, and re-entered service on 4 October 1982. The majority of the up line was subsequently lifted and a new signalling system, controlled from London Victoria, was commissioned in June 1983.

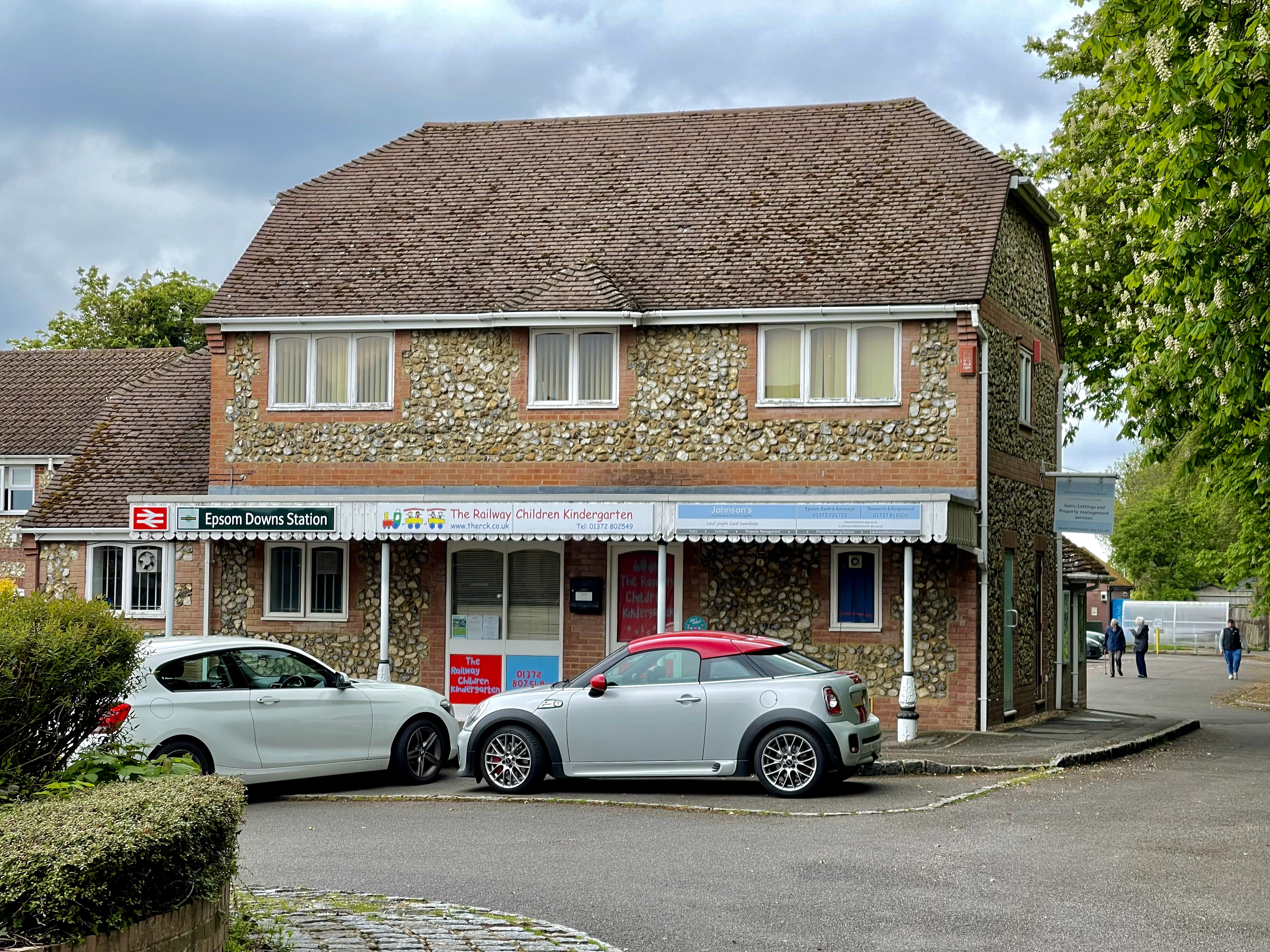
Epsom Downs station building in 2021

At the end of the 1980s, Epsom Downs station was sold for development. A single platform, around 350 yd (320 m) to the north of the original buffer stops, was opened on 14 February 1989 and a housing estate was built on the remainder of the site by the developer, Charles Church.

=== 21st century ===
In 2023, the Belmont Rail Frequency Improvement project was awarded £14.1 million to double the number of scheduled services on the northern part of the branch line. The scheme will improve access to the London Cancer Hub at the southern campus of the Royal Marsden Hospital. The project will include the extension of the platform at Belmont to 205 m (673 ft) to enable it to accommodate 10-car trains. Extra signals will be installed to allow two trains per hour from London Victoria to terminate at Belmont, in addition to the two services per hour that currently continue south to Epsom Downs. Infrastructure works are expected to be complete by August 2027, and the enhanced timetable is expected to begin that December.

== Bibliography ==
- Abdy, Charles (2001). Epsom Past. Bognor Regis: Phillimore. ISBN 978-1-86-077180-4.
- Berry, Patricia, ed. (1993). Cheam & Belmont in Old Photographs. Stroud: Alan Sutton Publishing. ISBN 978-0-75-090335-6.
- Burgess, Frank, ed. (1993). Cheam, Belmont and Worcester Park : A pictorial history. Chichester: Phillimore. ISBN 978-0-85-033879-9.
- Gough, Terry (2003). Surrey : The East of the County. Kettering: Past & Present. ISBN 978-1-85-895215-4.
- Home, Gordon (1901). Epsom: Its History and Surroundings. Epsom: S.R. Publishers Ltd.
- Hunn, David (1973). Epsom Racecourse. London: Davis-Poynter Ltd. ISBN 0-706-70099-6.
- Jackson, Alan A. (1999). The Railway in Surrey. Penryn: Atlantic Transport Publishers. ISBN 978-0-90-689990-8.
- Kirkby, J.R.W. (1983). The Banstead & Epsom Downs Railway. Tisbury: Oakwood Press. ISBN 978-0-85-361300-8.
- Oppitz, Leslie (1988). Surrey Railways Remembered. Newbury: Countryside Books. ISBN 978-1-85-306005-2.
- Mitchell, Vic; Smith, Keith (1992). West Croydon to Epsom. Midhurst: Middleton Press. ISBN 978-1-87-379308-4.
- Quick, Michael (2023) [2001]. Railway Passenger Stations in Great Britain (PDF) (5.05 ed.). London: Railway and Canal Historical Society.
- Turner, J.T. Howard (1978). The London, Brighton & South Coast Railway. Vol. 2 : Establishment and growth. London: B.T. Batsford. ISBN 978-0-71-341198-0.
- Turner, J.T. Howard (1979). The London, Brighton & South Coast Railway. Vol. 3 : Completion and maturity. London: B.T. Batsford. ISBN 978-0-71-341389-2.
- "Kent / Sussex / Wessex Routes Sectional Appendix" (PDF). Network Rail. 2009.
- "Delivering a better railway for a better Britain | Route Specifications: South East" (PDF). Network Rail. 2016.
- "Belmont Capacity Enhancement" (PDF). Network Rail. 3 September 2026. Archived (PDF) from the original on 14 October 2026.
