= Selhurst railway station =

National Rail station in London, England

Selhurst
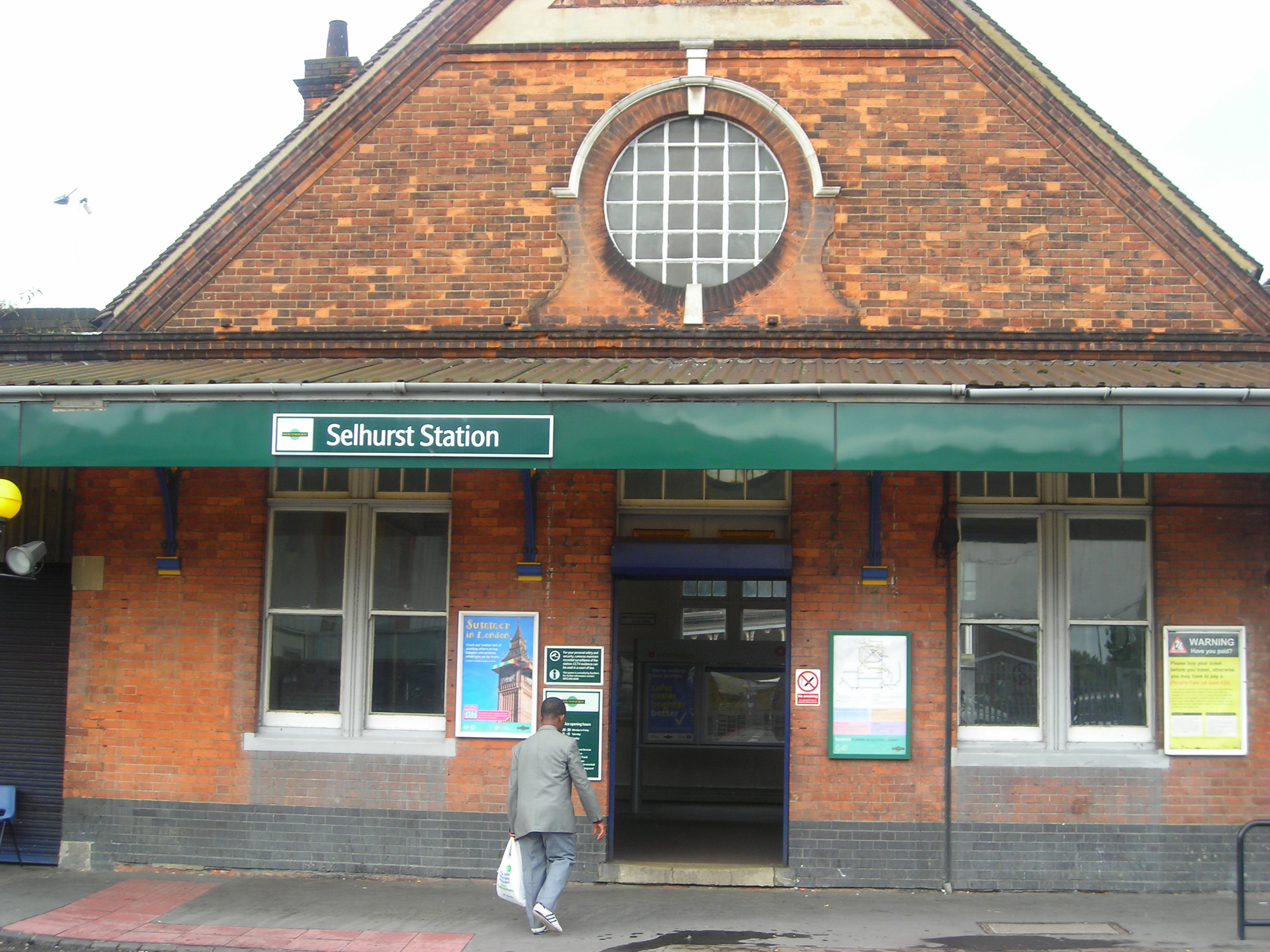
- Interactive map of Selhurst

General information
- Location: Selhurst
- Local authority: London Borough of Croydon
- Managed by: GTR Southern
- Station code: SRS
- DfT category: D
- Number of platforms: 4
- Fare zone: 4

National Rail annual entry and exit
- 2020–21: ▼0.455 million
- Interchange: ▼1,235
- 2021–22: ▲0.943 million
- Interchange: ▲2,067
- 2022–23: ▲0.988 million
- Interchange: ▲2,736
- 2023–24: ▲1.083 million
- Interchange: ▲11,320
- 2024–25: ▲1.218 million
- Interchange: ▼809

Key dates
- 1 May 1865: Opened

Other information
- External links: Departures; Facilities
- Coordinates: 51.3921°N 0.0883°W

Selhurst railway station is in the London Borough of Croydon in south London, 9 miles 31 chains (15.1 km) along the line from London Victoria. It is operated by Southern, which also provides all the train services. The station is in London fare zone 4.

== History ==
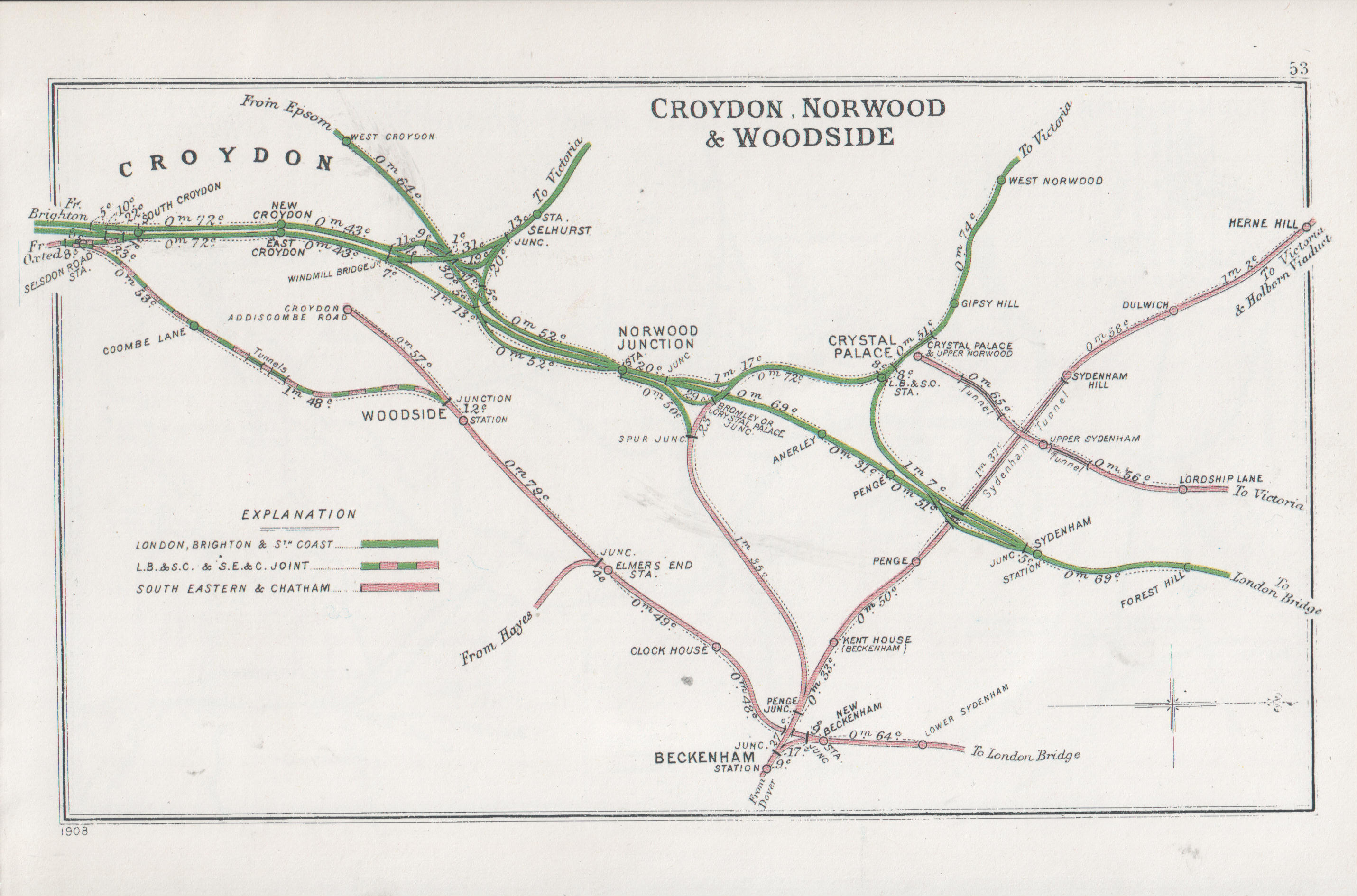
A 1908 Railway Clearing House map of lines around the Brighton Main Line between South Croydon and Selhurst / Forest Hill, as well as surrounding lines

The Balham Hill and East Croydon line was constructed by the London, Brighton and South Coast Railway (LB&SCR) as a short-cut on the Brighton Main Line to London Victoria, avoiding Crystal Palace and Norwood Junction. It was opened on 1 December 1862. However, Selhurst station was not opened until 1 May 1865.

The lines were quadrupled in 1903. In 1912, the lines were electrified via Norwood Junction to provide access for the carriage sheds and repair depot for the LB&SCR railway electrification scheme. In 1925, the lines from Victoria via Norbury were electrified.

== Services ==
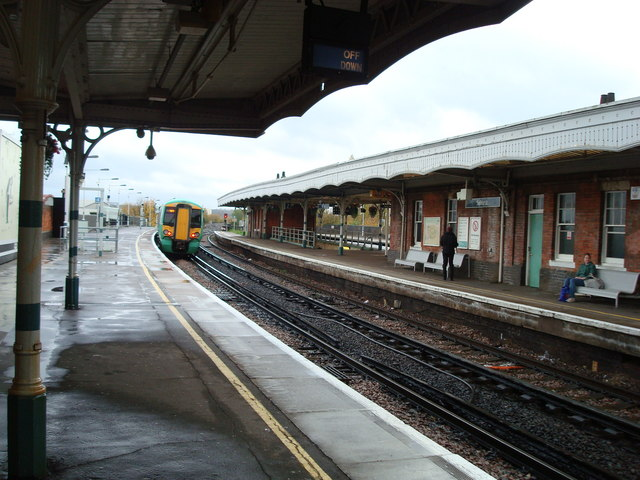
Selhurst station platforms in 2008

All services at Selhurst are operated by Southern using Class 377 EMUs.

The typical off-peak service in trains per hour is:

- 2 tph to London Bridge via Tulse Hill
- 2 tph to London Victoria
- 1 tph to Watford Junction via Kensington (Olympia)
- 3 tph to East Croydon
- 2 tph to Epsom Downs

During the peak hours, the station is served by an additional half-hourly service between London Victoria and Sutton.

At very early morning and late at night, trains will start/terminate here from Selhurst Depot.

Some additional fast services from London Victoria and East Croydon occasionally stop at platforms 3 & 4 during events at Selhurst Park, or engineering works.

Electronic ticket barriers were installed at the station in spring 2010.

Preceding station	National Rail	Following station
Thornton Heath	Southern Brighton Main Line Stopping Services	East Croydon
Thornton Heath	Southern West London Line	East Croydon
Thornton Heath	Southern Sutton & Mole Valley Lines	West Croydon

== Connections ==
London Buses routes 75 and 157 serve the station.

== Selhurst Railway Depot ==
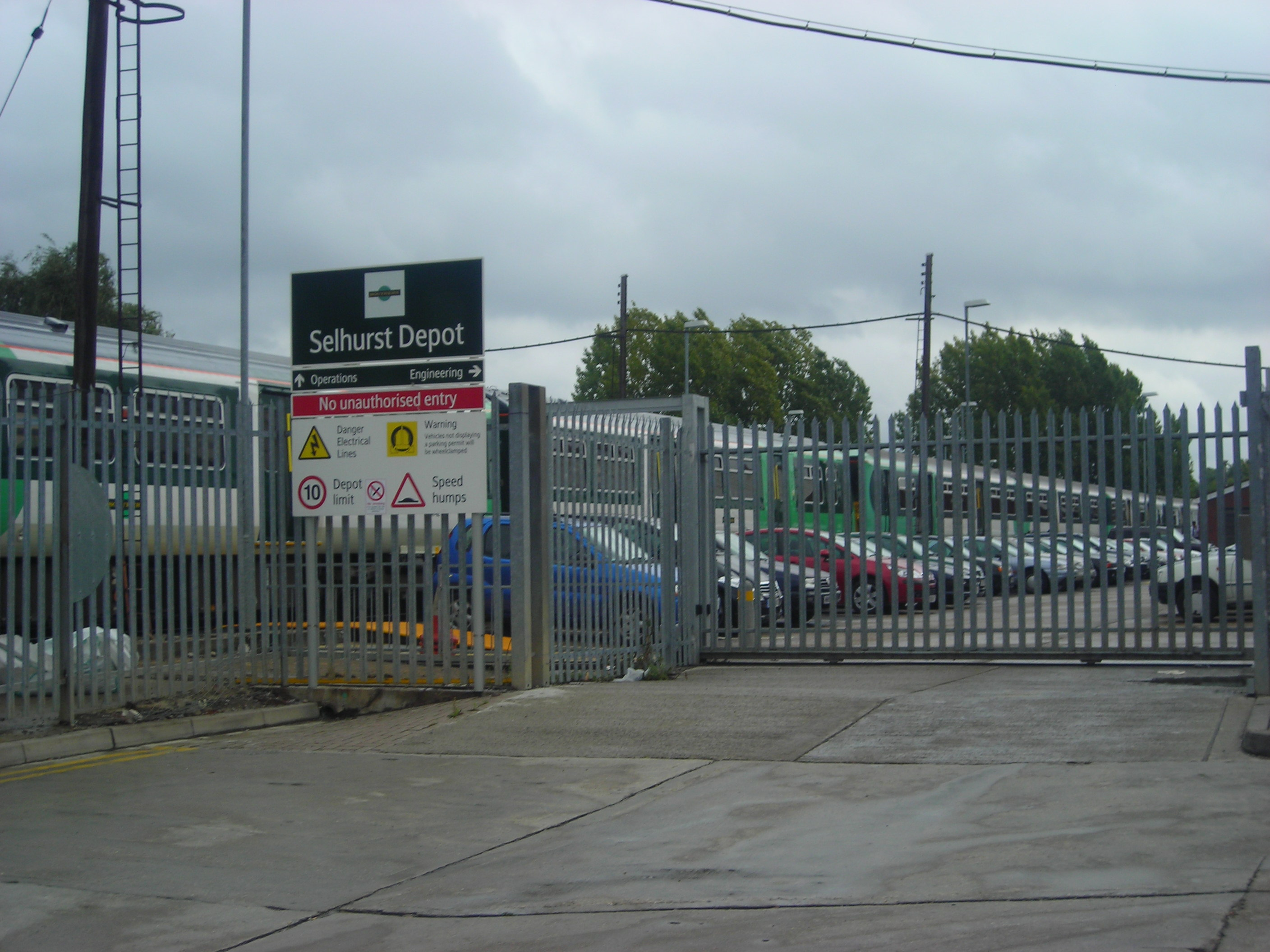
Selhurst Depot main entrance just opposite Selhurst station

Selhurst Depot is located to the east of Selhurst station, and occupies a triangle of land bordered on one side by the Victoria lines and on another by the London Bridge lines. It was built on the site of the former Croydon Common Athletic Ground, where Crystal Palace F.C. played matches between 1918 and 1924.

The depot is operated by the Southern train operating company, and units serviced there include classes 171, 377, 387 plus numerous departmental units and a Class 09 shunter.

Within the main office building is located Selhurst traincrew depot, where many drivers and conductors are based. The depot has extensive stabling sidings, the three main groups of which are known as: Chalk, AC (which were so named because that was where the trains of the former AC system were stabled) and North. There is a large maintenance shed, an AC test rig (for dual voltage units equipped with pantographs), a train wash plant, and a cleaning shed. At the north-east corner of the site, near Norwood Junction station, is the smaller Norwood drivers' depot, and beside it the diesel fuelling point. Selhurst is unusual in that the maximum speed within the depot is 15 mph rather than the usual 5 mph, and signalled train movements are permissive.
