= Belmont railway station (Sutton) =

Railway station in Sutton, London

Belmont
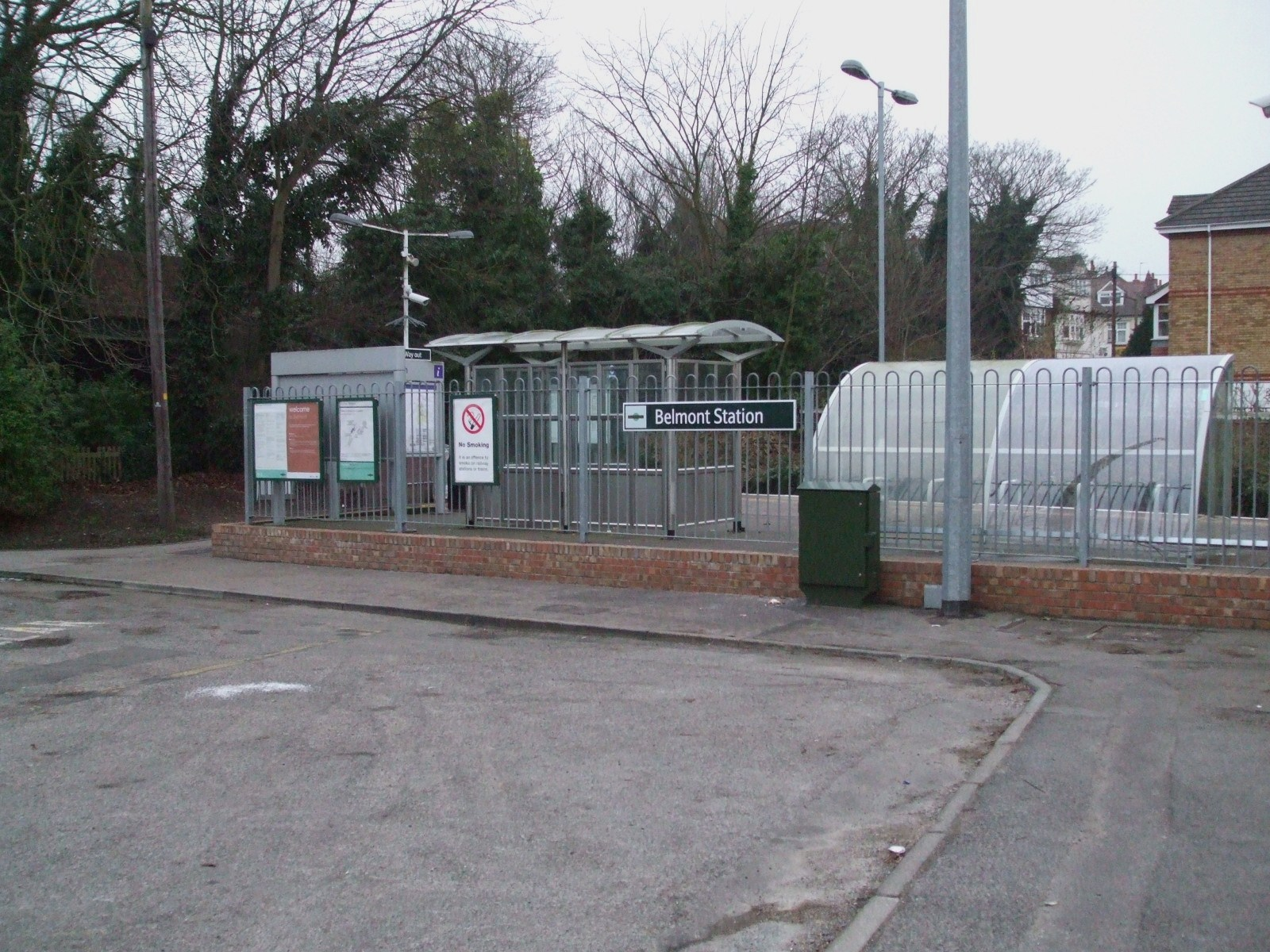
- Interactive map of Belmont

General information
- Location: Belmont
- Local authority: London Borough of Sutton
- Managed by: Southern
- Station code: BLM
- DfT category: F1
- Number of platforms: 1
- Accessible: Yes
- Fare zone: 5

National Rail annual entry and exit
- 2020–21: ▼57,358
- 2021–22: ▲0.108 million
- 2022–23: ▲0.145 million
- 2023–24: ▲0.178 million
- 2024–25: ▲0.200 million

Key dates
- 22 May 1865: Opened as California
- 1 October 1875: Renamed Belmont

Other information
- External links: Departures; Facilities
- Coordinates: 51.344°N 0.1986°W

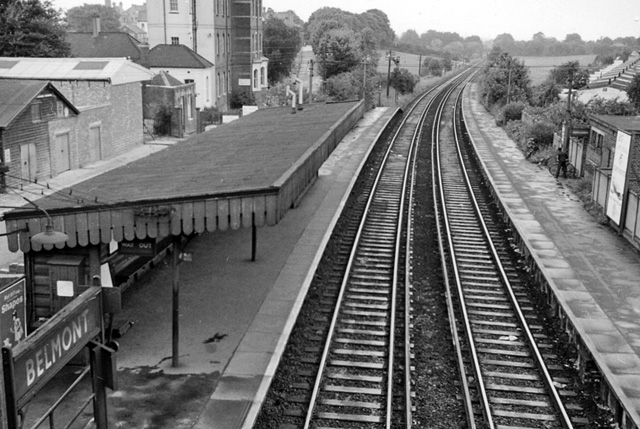
The station in 1961

Belmont railway station serves the village of Belmont in the London Borough of Sutton in south London. The station is located on the Epsom Downs line and is in London fare zone 5. It is 16 miles 1 chain (16.01 miles, 25.77 km) down the line from London Bridge measured via West Croydon. It is the closest station to the Royal Marsden Hospital, which is just under half a mile away.

== History ==
The station was opened by the London, Brighton and South Coast Railway on 22 May 1865, as part of the Epsom Downs branch line. The branch was originally laid as double track because of the race traffic, and was electrified on 17 June 1928. A modern CLASP (pre-fabricated concrete) building was erected in the 1970s (this has since been demolished and cleared away). The branch was singled in 1982 and all trains use the former down platform. The station itself has a ticket machine, cycle storage huts and a passenger waiting shelter.

The station was originally named 'California', and was changed to 'Belmont' on 1 October 1875.

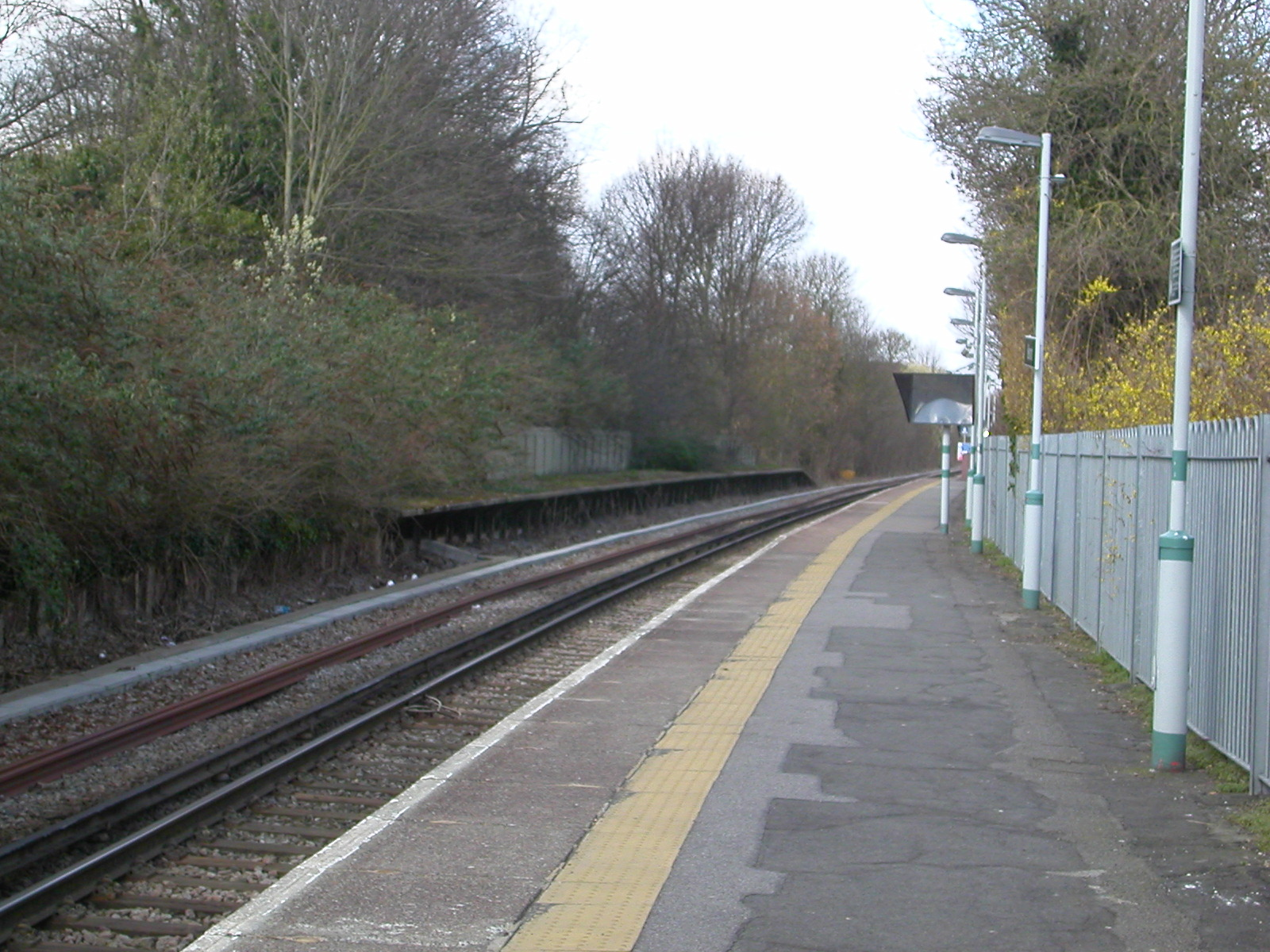
The remains of the former Up platform, on the far side of the single track

== Future ==
On 19 January 2023, Sutton Council were granted £14,121,979 from the government to add a turnback siding to the south of the station to increase capacity to allow 4 tph to run to London Victoria as opposed to 2 tph at present. The enhanced timetable will commence from December 2027.

== Services ==
All services at Belmont are operated by Southern using Class 377 EMUs.

The typical off-peak service in trains per hour is:

- 2 tph to London Victoria via Norbury
- 2 tph to Epsom Downs

Prior to May 2018, the station was served by an hourly service on weekdays and Saturdays only, with no Sunday service. In May 2018, a half-hourly service was introduced on all days of the week.

Preceding station	National Rail	Following station
Sutton	Southern Epsom Downs Branch	Banstead

== Connections ==
London Buses routes 80, 280, S1, S3, S4 and non-TfL routes 420 and 820 serve the station.
