= Belmont Pastures =

Nature reserve in London, England

Coordinates: 51.3452°N 0.1977°W

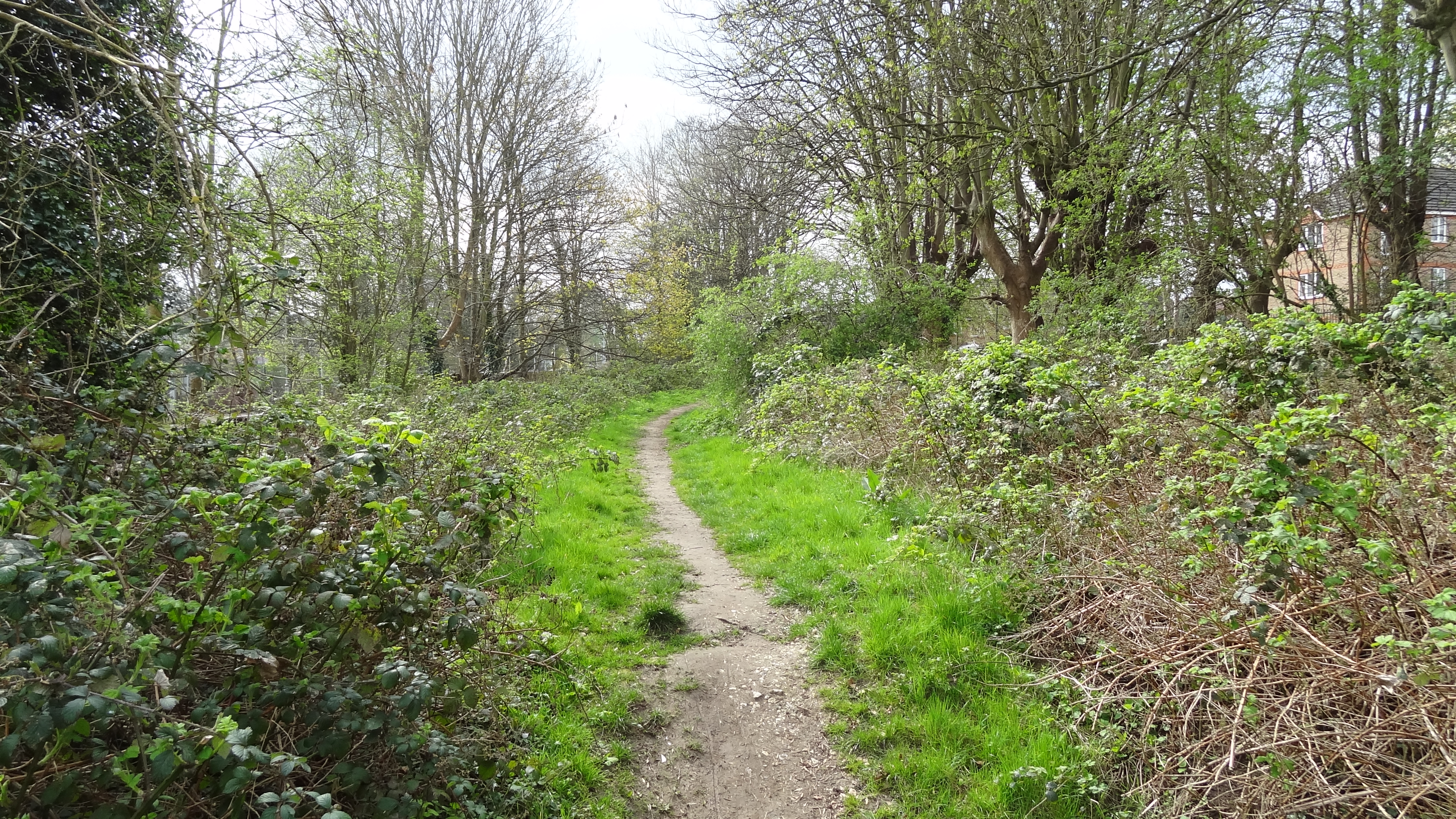

Belmont Pastures is a 1.3 hectare Local Nature Reserve and Site of Borough Importance for Nature Conservation, Grade II, in Belmont in the London Borough of Sutton. It is owned by Sutton Council and managed by the council together with Sutton Nature Conservation Volunteers.

The site is a long narrow triangle north of Belmont railway station. It is an old meadow which formerly belonged to Belmont Hospital. The meadow is unimproved chalk grassland with common grasses and wild flowers, including common vetch, bladder campion and common knapweed. It provides a good habitat for invertebrates such as butterflies, grasshoppers and crickets. On the eastern side there is a hawthorn hedge next to the railway line, while the western edge is lined by an avenue of large trees, mainly horse chestnut.

There is access from Sevenoaks Close.
