= Thornton Heath railway station =

National Rail station in London, England

Thornton Heath
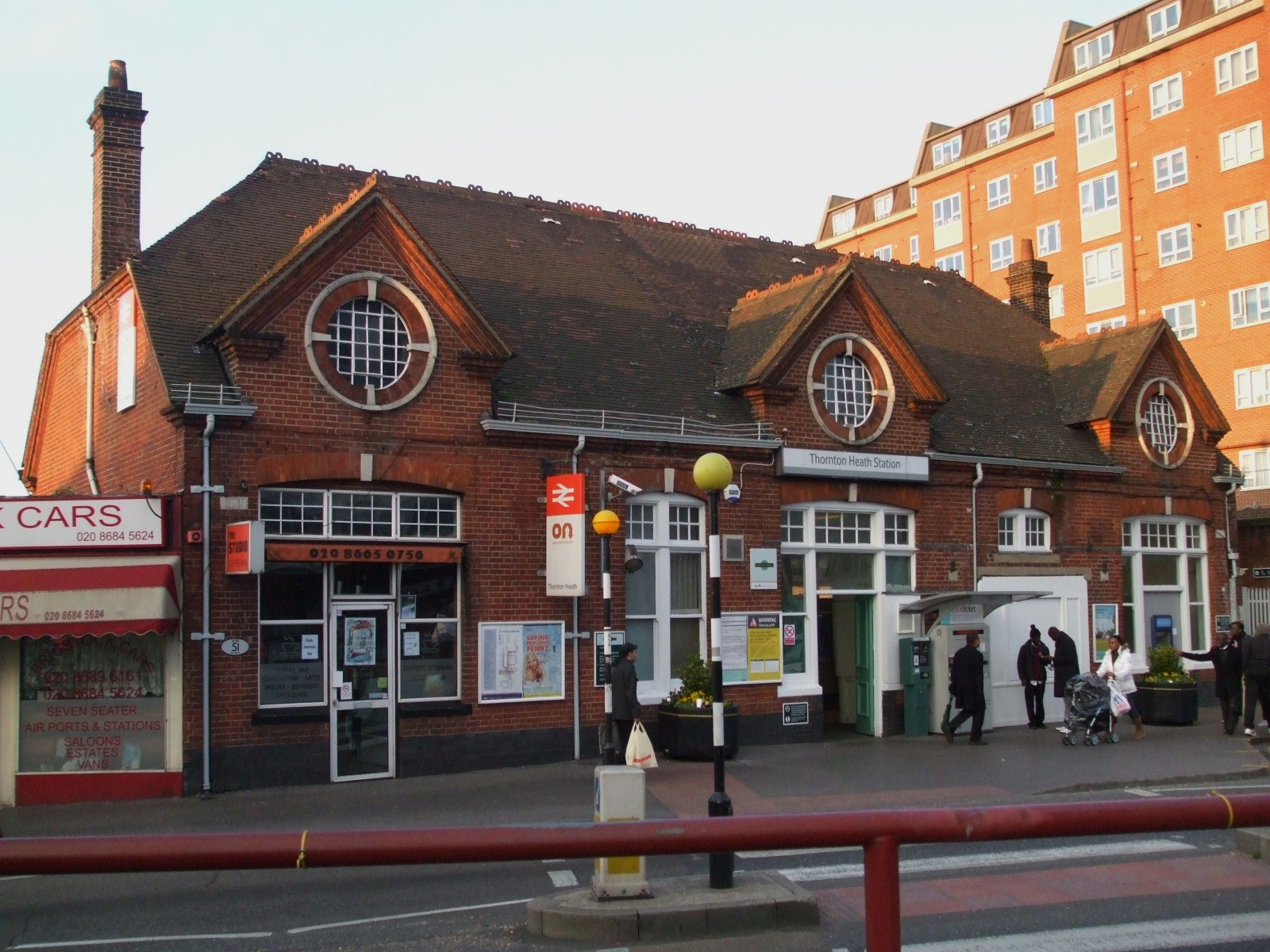
- The station building
- Interactive map of Thornton Heath

General information
- Location: Thornton Heath
- Local authority: London Borough of Croydon
- Managed by: Southern
- Station code: TTH
- DfT category: C2
- Number of platforms: 4 (2 rarely used)
- Fare zone: 4

National Rail annual entry and exit
- 2020–21: ▼1.044 million
- 2021–22: ▲1.692 million
- 2022–23: ▲1.915 million
- 2023–24: ▲2.183 million
- 2024–25: ▲2.432 million
- Interchange: 15,190

Key dates
- 1 December 1862: Opened

Other information
- External links: Departures; Facilities
- Coordinates: 51.3985°N 0.1004°W

Thornton Heath is a railway station in the London Borough of Croydon in south London, 8 miles 64 chains (14.2 km) down the line from London Victoria. It is on the Brighton Main Line between Norbury and Selhurst. The station is operated by Southern, who also provide all train services. The station is in London fare zone 4.

== History ==
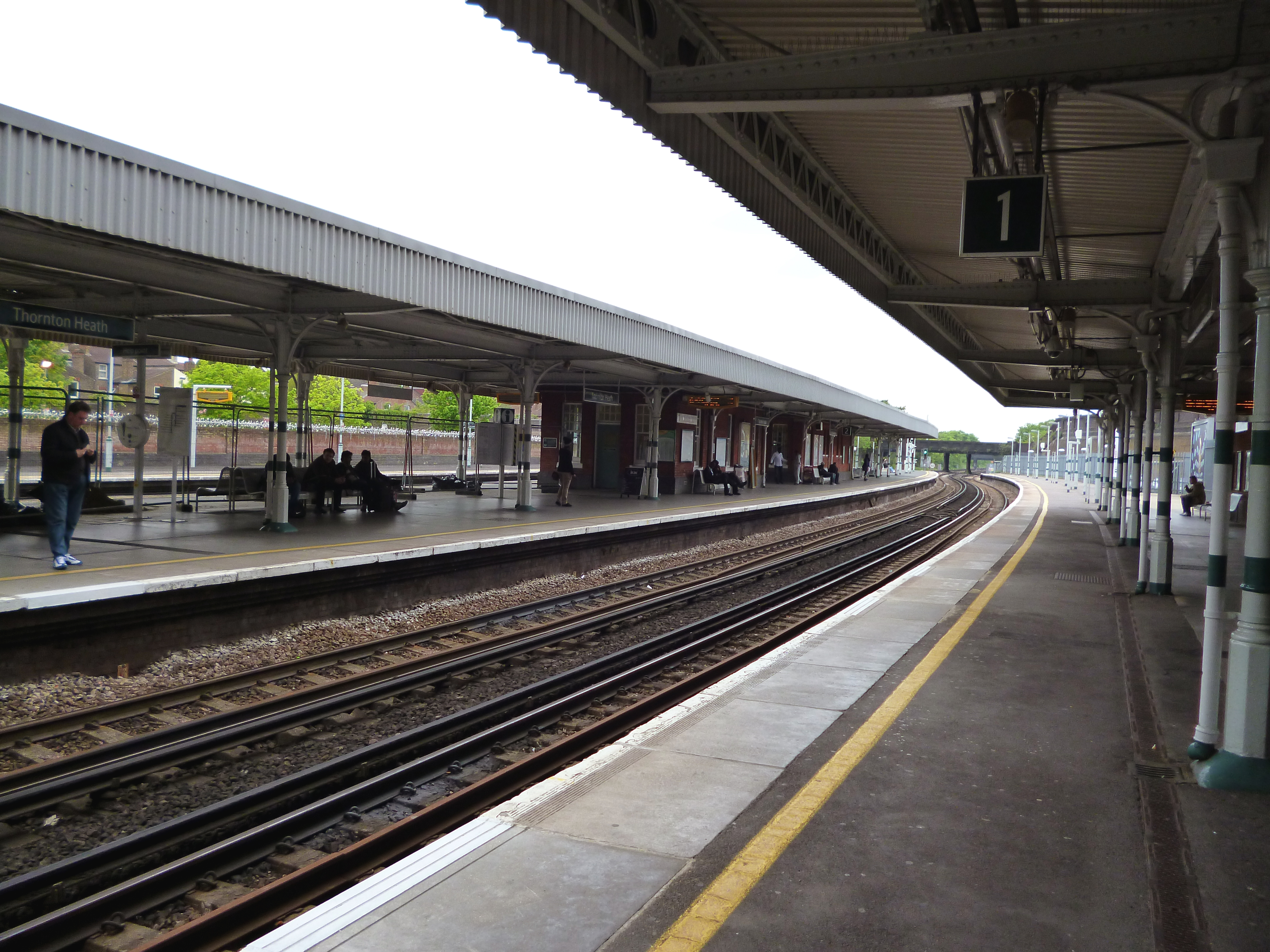
The slow platforms seen in 2012

The Balham Hill and East Croydon line was constructed by the London Brighton and South Coast Railway (LB&SCR) as a short-cut on the Brighton Main Line to London Victoria, avoiding Crystal Palace and Norwood Junction. It was opened on 1 December 1862. There is uncertainty as to whether the station was originally planned to be named Colliers Water Lane (for Thornton Heath). Some sources suggest it was later renamed to New Thornton Heath, but this is not mentioned by others.

The lines were quadrupled in 1903, and electrified in 1925.

== Passenger volume ==
Passenger Volume at Thornton Heath
	2002–03	2004–05	2005–06	2006–07	2007–08	2008–09	2009–10	2010–11	2011–12	2012–13	2013–14	2014–15	2015–16	2016–17	2017–18	2018–19	2019–20	2020–21	2021–22	2022–23
Entries and exits	1,788,134	1,785,882	1,816,383	2,365,090	2,593,059	2,377,258	2,383,818	2,633,274	2,848,656	2,970,480	3,073,494	3,266,642	3,856,500	3,390,804	3,327,476	3,277,862	3,098,306	1,044,488	1,692,254	1,915,222

The statistics cover twelve month periods that start in April.

== Services ==
The typical off-peak service in trains per hour is:

- 2 tph to London Bridge via Tulse Hill
- 2 tph to London Victoria
- 1 tph to Watford Junction via Kensington (Olympia)
- 3 tph to East Croydon
- 2 tph to Epsom Downs

During the peak hours, the station is served by an additional half-hourly service between London Victoria and Sutton.

Preceding station	National Rail	Following station
Norbury	Southern Brighton Main Line Stopping Services	Selhurst
Norbury	Southern West London Line	Selhurst

== Bibliography ==
- Quick, Michael (2023). Railway Passenger Stations in Great Britain: A Chronology (PDF) (5th ed.). London: Railway and Canal Historical Society.
