= Banstead railway station =

National Rail station in Surrey, England

Banstead
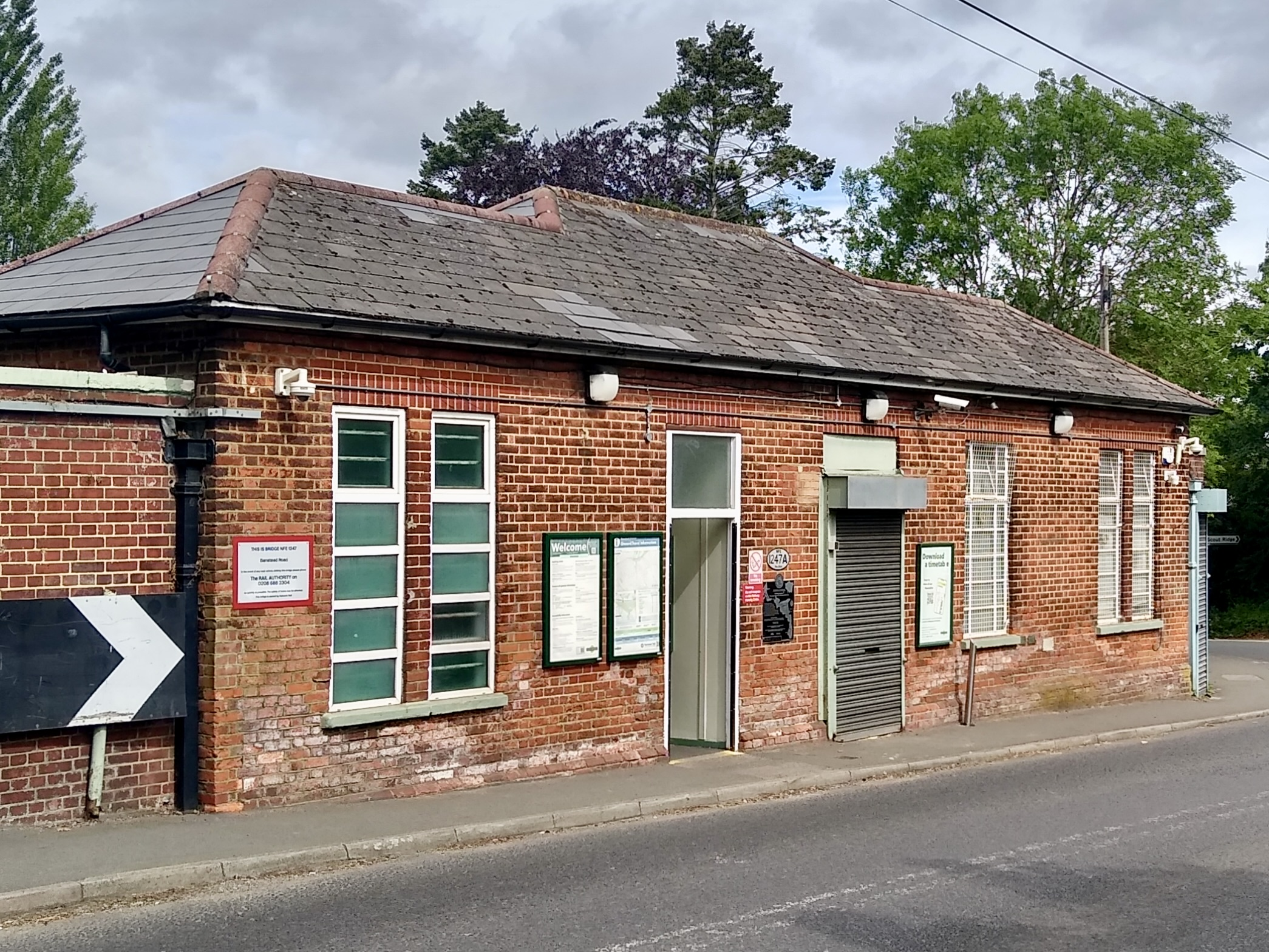
- Station building at road level in 2026
- Interactive map of Banstead

General information
- Location: Banstead
- Local authority: Borough of Reigate and Banstead
- Managed by: Southern
- Station code: BAD
- DfT category: F1
- Number of platforms: 1
- Fare zone: 6

National Rail annual entry and exit
- 2020–21: ▼42,692
- 2021–22: ▲94,576
- 2022–23: ▲0.115 million
- 2023–24: ▲0.139 million
- 2024–25: ▲0.149 million

Railway companies
- Original company: London, Brighton and South Coast Railway
- Pre-grouping: London, Brighton and South Coast Railway
- Post-grouping: Southern Railway

Key dates
- 22 May 1865: Opened as Banstead
- 1 June 1898: Renamed Banstead and Burgh Heath
- August 1928: Renamed Banstead

Other information
- External links: Departures; Facilities
- Coordinates: 51.329194°N 0.213194°W

Banstead railway station serves the village of Banstead in the borough of Reigate and Banstead in Surrey. It is managed by Southern, which operates all passenger services. Banstead station is on the Epsom Downs branch line between Belmont and Epsom Downs, 17 miles 40 chains (17.50 miles, 28.16 km) down the line from London Bridge, measured via West Croydon.

Housing and gardens in Banstead in this area border Greater London 500m away to the north. Accordingly, since January 2006, the station has been included in London fare zone 6. The station lies some distance to the north-west of the High Street on the edge of Banstead Downs.

== Station buildings ==
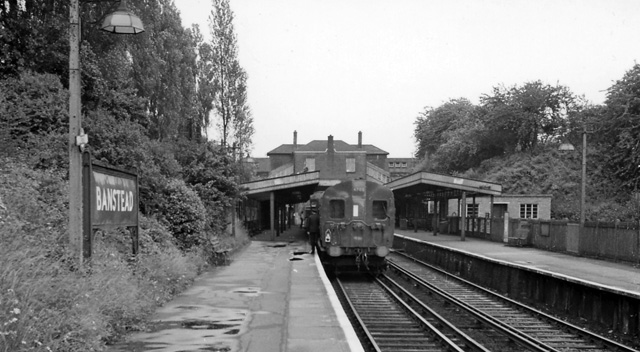
The station in 1961

The station was opened by the London, Brighton and South Coast Railway on 22 May 1865 as part of the Epsom Downs branch line. The branch was originally laid as double track to accommodate Epsom Downs horse race traffic and was electrified on 17 June 1928. In the 1920s, the station's name was painted in large letters on the roof as a navigation tool for pilots coming into Croydon Airport. Due to the destruction by fire of the Epsom Downs signal box in November 1981, the branch was singled for most of its length in October 1982 and trains stopping at Banstead now use only the down platform where there is a shelter. The up track and platform have been removed.

== Services ==
All services at Banstead are operated by Southern using Class 377 EMUs.

The typical off-peak service in trains per hour is:

- 2 tph to London Victoria via Norbury
- 2 tph to Epsom Downs

Before May 2018, the station was served by an hourly service on weekdays and Saturdays only, with no Sunday service. In May 2018, a half-hourly service was introduced on all days of the week.

There is an electronic display showing arrivals and departures. A ticket machine was installed in October 2011 replacing a Permit to Travel machine and there are also two Oystercard readers.

| Preceding station | National Rail | Following station |
|---|---|---|
| Belmont | Southern Epsom Downs Branch | Epsom Downs |
