= Cuddington Meadows =

Nature reserve in London

Coordinates: 51.3348°N 0.2135°W

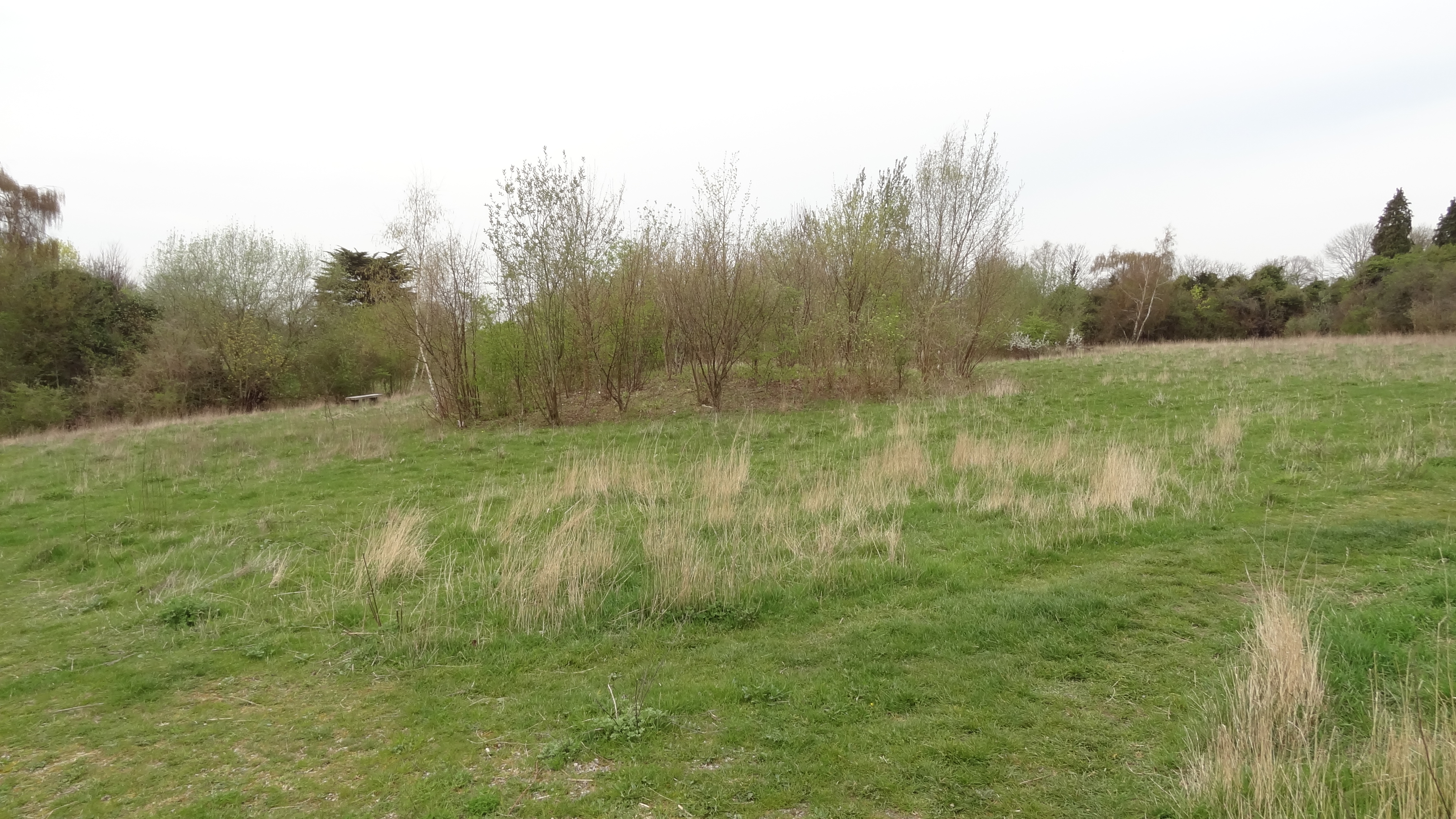

Cuddington Meadows is a 1.4-hectare (3.5-acre) Local Nature Reserve and Site of Borough Importance for Nature Conservation, Grade I, in Belmont in the London Borough of Sutton. It is owned by Sutton Council and managed by the council together with Sutton Nature Conservation Volunteers.

The site was shown as two enclosures on the open Banstead Downs on an early nineteenth-century map, and it was later part of Walnut Tree Farm, which became Cuddington Hospital in 1897. The hospital closed in 1984, and in the late 1990s the land was transferred to Sutton Council to be managed for nature conservation.

It is mainly chalk grassland with some scrub. Its most important feature is a variety of unusual flowering plants, including greater knapweed, lady's bedstraw and field scabious. Sixteen species of butterflies have been recorded, such as the rare small blue and green hairstreak.

There is access from Cuddington Park Close.
