= Howell Hill =

Nature reserve in Surrey, England

Coordinates: 51.342°N 0.224°W

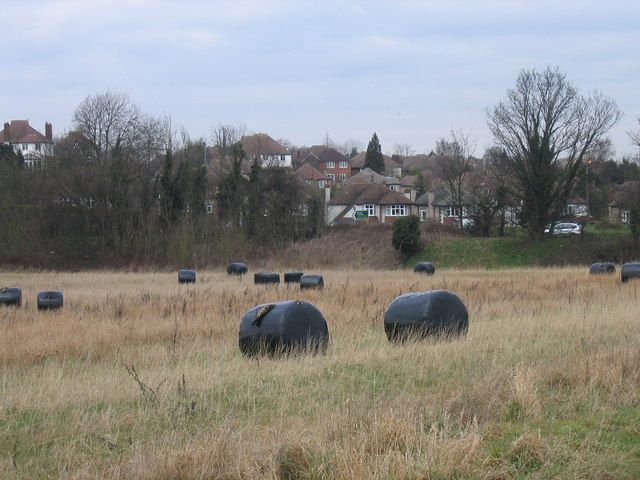
- Interactive map of Howell Hill
- Type: Nature reserve
- Location: Ewell, Surrey
- OS grid: TQ238618
- Area: 5 hectares (12 acres)
- Manager: Surrey Wildlife Trust

Howell Hill is a 5-hectare (12-acre) nature reserve east of Ewell in Surrey. It is owned by Surrey County Council and managed by the Surrey Wildlife Trust.

There are chalk spoil heaps on this calcareous grassland site. Around 260 species of flowering plants have been recorded, including mouse-eared hawkweed, kidney vetch, common spotted orchid, common knapweed, fragrant orchid and white helleborine orchid.

The reserve adjoins Walsh Memorial Playing Fields (about twice its size) and is across a locally house-less road (Cuddington Way) from Cuddington Golf Course (about 8 times its size) which has on its land woodland buffers, including a patch of ancient woodland to its east side; three 'holes' of the course adjoin the west side of the nature reserve directly adding to this habitat for some wildlife as a sector of the course surrounded by deep rows of mature trees.

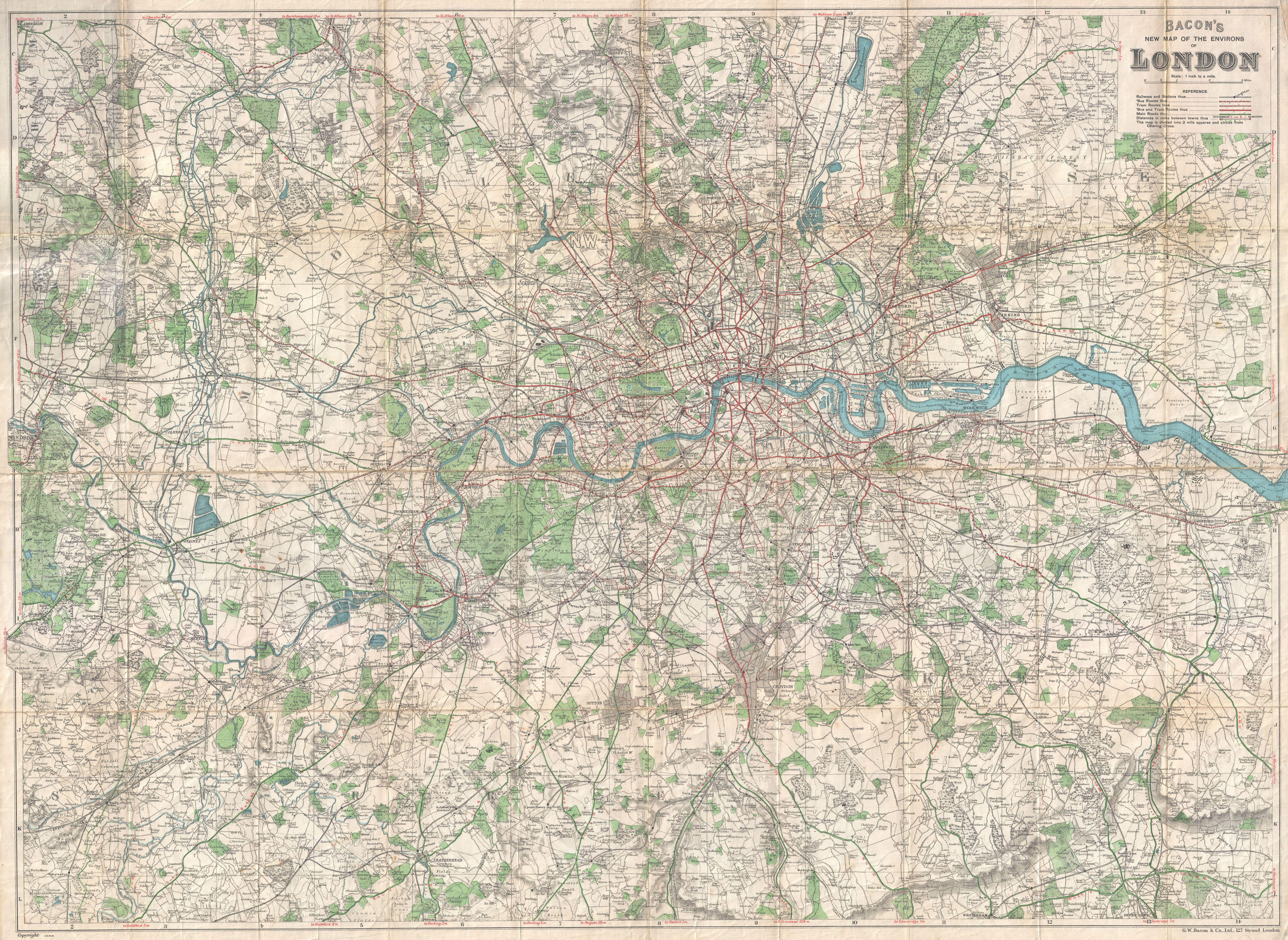
Extract from Bacon Pocket Map of London (1920)

Howell Hill also refers to the north (lower) part of this upland, closer to a railway station, which has been developed in the 20th century into suburban homes the related and competing terms for the area which straddles East Ewell and Cheam are: Cuddington with a southern emphasis (heart) and Cheam Warren with slight eastern overlap. As such, the name of an Anglican parish, the church at the heart of this aspect of Howell Hill is called "St Paul's Church, Howell Hill".
