= Norbury railway station =

Railway station in London, England

Norbury
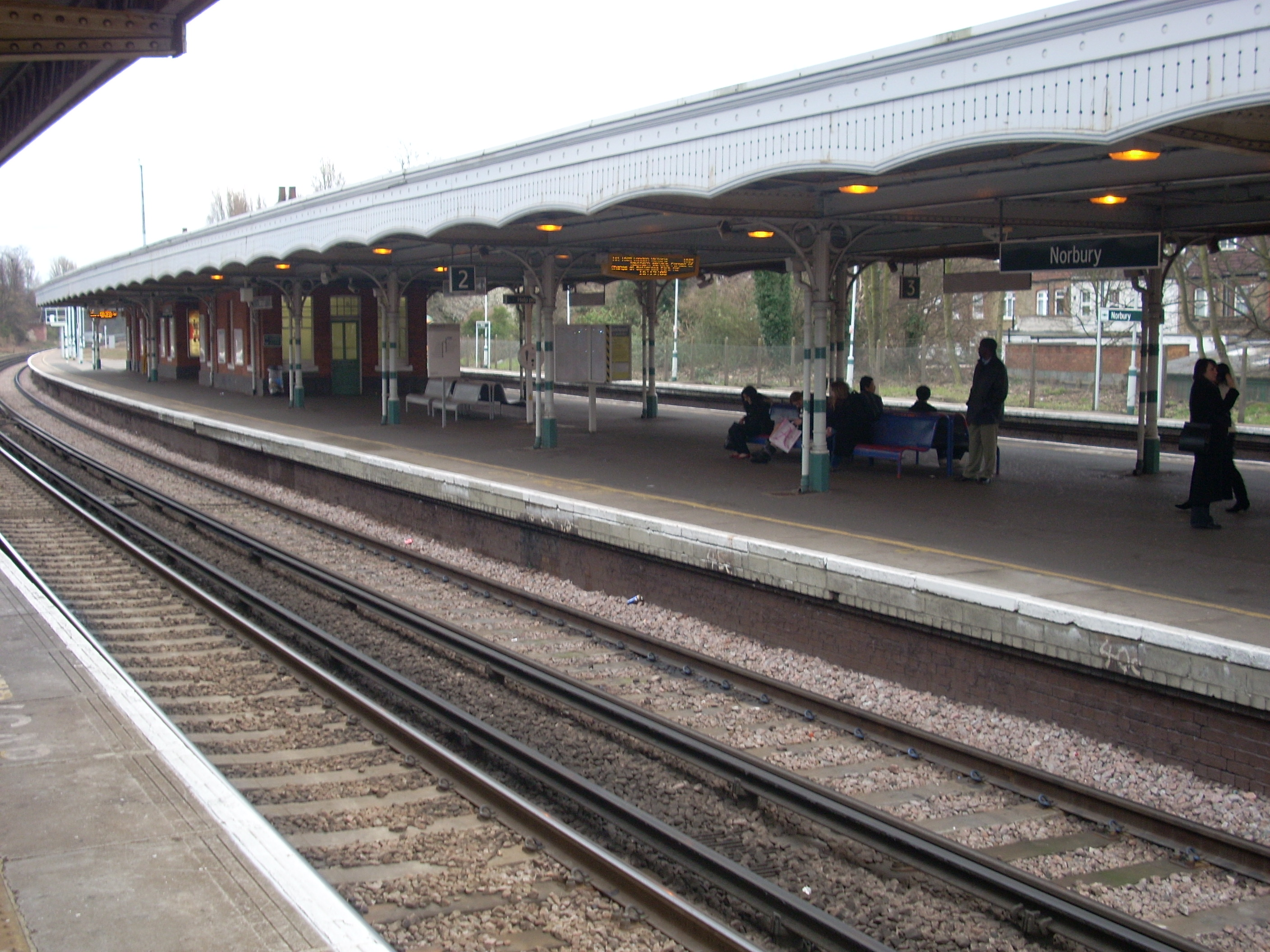
- Interactive map of Norbury

General information
- Location: Norbury
- Local authority: London Borough of Croydon
- Managed by: Southern
- Station code: NRB
- DfT category: C2
- Number of platforms: 4 (2 of which are rarely used)
- Accessible: Yes
- Fare zone: 3

National Rail annual entry and exit
- 2020–21: ▼1.043 million
- 2021–22: ▲1.686 million
- 2022–23: ▲1.938 million
- 2023–24: ▲2.217 million
- 2024–25: ▲2.349 million

Key dates
- January 1878: Opened

Other information
- External links: Departures; Facilities
- Coordinates: 51.4114°N 0.1214°W

Norbury railway station is a National Rail station in the Norbury area of the London Borough of Croydon in south London. It is on the Brighton Main Line, 7 miles 36 chains (12.0 km) down the line from London Victoria. The station is operated by Southern, which also provides all train services. It is in London fare zone 3 and ticket barriers are in operation at this station.

== History ==
The Balham Hill and East Croydon line was constructed by the London, Brighton and South Coast Railway (LB&SCR) as a short-cut on the Brighton Main Line to London Victoria, avoiding Crystal Palace and Norwood Junction. It was opened on 1 December 1862. However, Norbury station was not opened until January 1878, for the surrounding area was very rural. The station was rebuilt in 1903 when the lines were quadrupled. In 1925 the lines were electrified.

Ticket gates were installed in 2009.

A nearby Victorian race track, dating from 1868, was situated in fields forming part of Lonesome Farm, which later became the sports ground of the National Westminster Bank (NatWest). The course, which included a water jump across the River Graveney, hosted the 'Streatham Races'. Race meetings attracted huge crowds of racegoers, bookies and other notorious characters, who flocked to the course by train. This exciting but disreputable period of history came to an end in 1879 when the Racecourse Licensing Act banned racecourses within a radius of 10 miles (16 km) of London.

== Services ==
All services at Norbury are operated by Southern using Class 377 EMUs.

The typical off-peak service in trains per hour is:

- 2 tph to London Bridge via Tulse Hill
- 2 tph to London Victoria
- 1 tph to Watford Junction via Kensington (Olympia)
- 3 tph to East Croydon
- 2 tph to Epsom Downs

During the peak hours, the station is served by an additional half-hourly service between London Victoria and Sutton.

Preceding station	National Rail	Following station
Streatham Common	Southern Brighton Main Line Stopping Services	Thornton Heath
Streatham Common	Southern West London Line	Thornton Heath

== Connections ==
London Buses routes 50, 109 and 255 and night route N109 all serve Norbury station.
