= Epsom Downs railway station =

National Rail station in Surrey, England

Epsom Downs
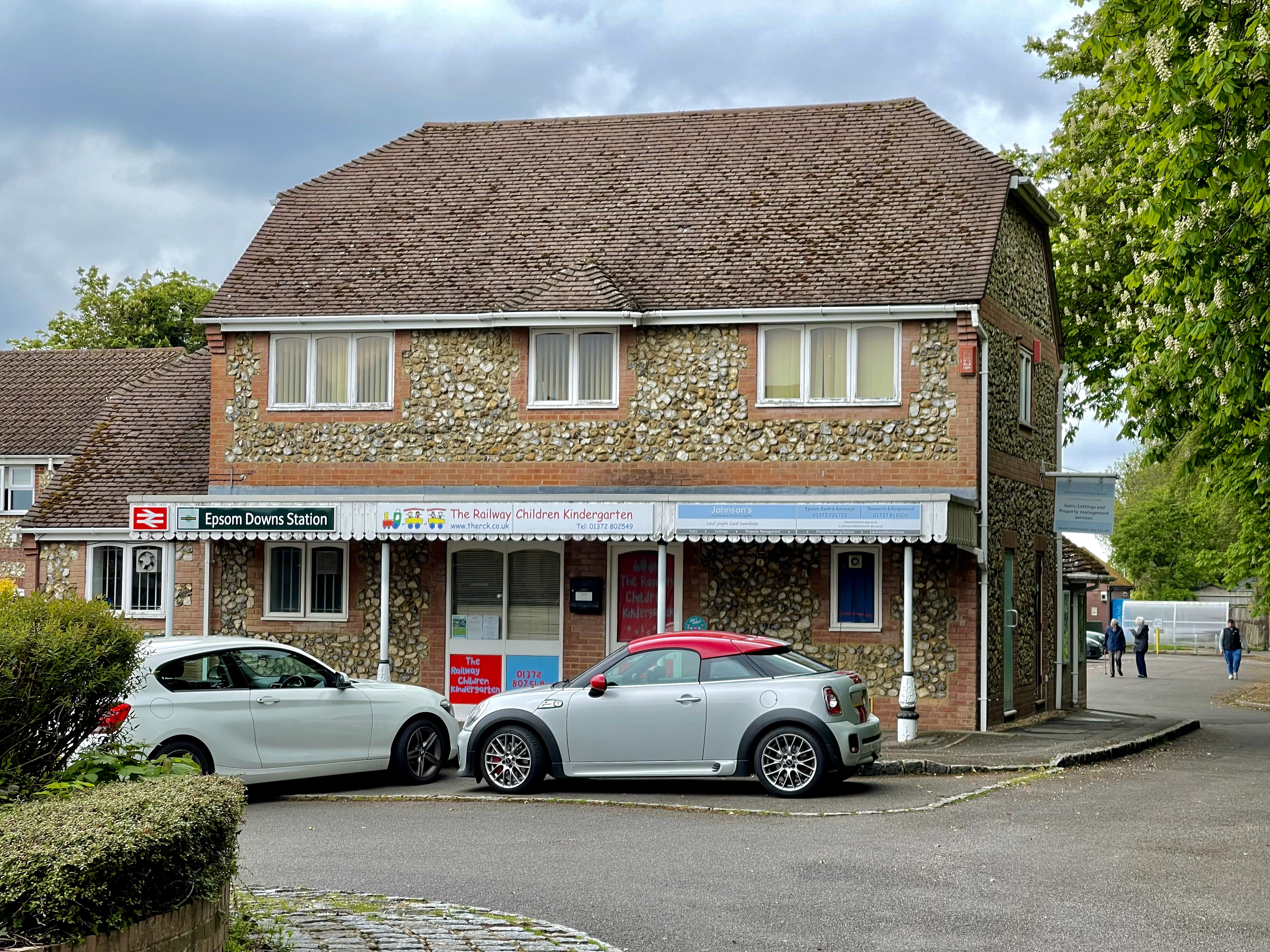
- The station building, which now houses a day nursery
- Interactive map of Epsom Downs

General information
- Location: Epsom Downs
- Local authority: Borough of Reigate and Banstead
- Managed by: Southern
- Station code: EPD
- DfT category: F1
- Number of platforms: 1
- Accessible: Yes
- Fare zone: 6

National Rail annual entry and exit
- 2020–21: ▼29,250
- 2021–22: ▲67,982
- 2022–23: ▲0.106 million
- 2023–24: ▲0.120 million
- 2024–25: ▲0.126 million

Key dates
- 22 May 1865: original station opened
- 3 October 1982: line singled
- 13 February 1989: station resited

Other information
- External links: Departures; Facilities
- Coordinates: 51.323694°N 0.238917°W

Epsom Downs railway station is in the Borough of Reigate and Banstead (Note: The station is immediately adjacent to the boundary of the Borough of Epsom and Ewell.) in Surrey. The station, and all trains serving it, are operated by Southern. It is on the Epsom Downs line 18 miles 57 chains (18.71 miles, 30.11 km) down the line from London Bridge, measured via West Croydon. In the past the station had nine platforms, but today only one remains.

Epsom Downs is near Tattenham Corner station which is on the Tattenham Corner line, also served by Southern. Both are in London fare zone 6.

== History ==
With large numbers of passengers travelling to Epsom to visit the Epsom Downs Racecourse, it became clear that a station near the course was needed. Attempts to build one immediately next to it were strongly opposed by the Epsom Grandstand Association and eventually land was purchased half a mile from the course. Designed by David J. Field, the original station was opened on 22 May 1865 on the London, Brighton and South Coast Railway's extension from Sutton. The line had double track and a nine-platform station with a large building.

With the opening of Tattenham Corner railway station, much closer to the racecourse, on 4 June 1901 (Derby Day), traffic declined, helped in particular by the Royal Train changing its destination to Tattenham Corner in 1925. Services were cut back repeatedly over subsequent decades. On 1 May 1972 the number of working platforms was reduced to two, and following the destruction by fire of Epsom Downs signal box in November 1981 almost the entire branch was reduced to single track operation on 3 October 1982.

On 13 February 1989 a new station was opened 21 chains (420 m) short of the original one. The old station and platforms were demolished and the land in between given over to a major housing development. The replacement station was installed by British Rail under the Network SouthEast sector.

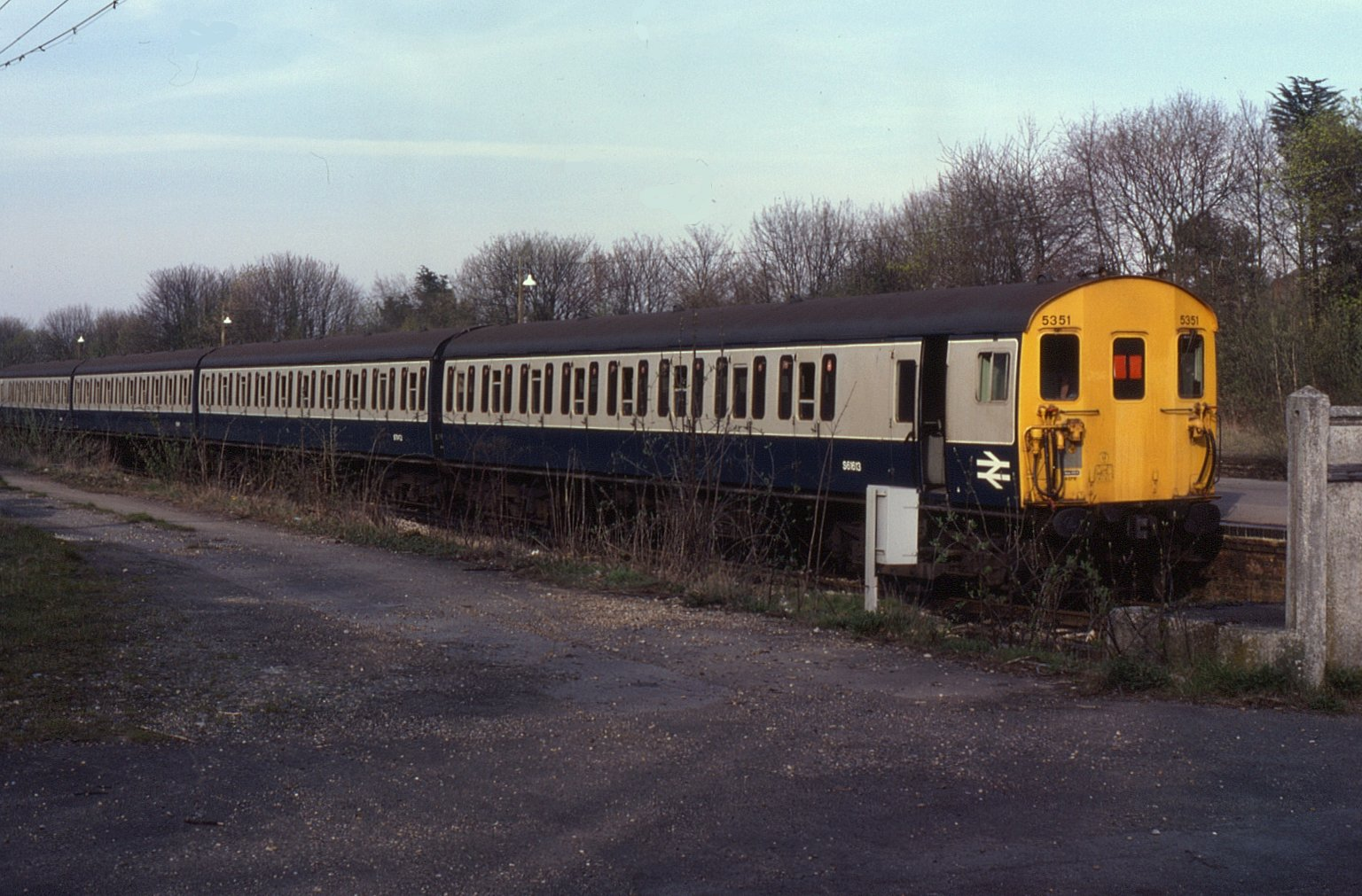
4EPB in Epsom Downs in 1984.

== Services ==
All services at Epsom Downs are operated by Southern using Class 377 EMUs.

The typical off-peak service in trains per hour is:

- 2 tph to London Victoria via Norbury

Prior to May 2018, the station was served by an hourly service on weekdays and Saturdays only, with no Sunday service. In May 2018, a half-hourly service was introduced on all days of the week.

Preceding station	National Rail	Following station
Banstead	Southern Epsom Downs Branch	Terminus
