= Merton Park (ward) =

- Electoral ward for the Merton London Borough Council
- Merton Park ward boundaries since 2022
- Borough: Merton
- County: Greater London
- Population: 8,294 (2021) (Note: 2021 Census data reported for 2022 ward boundaries)
- Electorate: 6,038 (2022)
- Major settlements: Merton Park
- Area: 1.697 square kilometres (0.655 sq mi)

Current electoral ward
- Created: 1978
- Number of members: 1978–2022: 3; 2022–present: 2
- Councillors: Edward Foley; Stephen Mercer
- GSS code: E05000466 (2002–2022); E05013820 (2022–present)

Merton Park is an electoral ward in the London Borough of Merton. The ward was first used in the 1978 elections. It returns councillors to Merton London Borough Council. The ward was subject to boundary revisions in 2002 and 2022. The 2022 revision reduced the number of councillors from three to two. The ward is unusual in London because of its active residents association, the Merton Park Ward Residents Association, who have won all seats in the ward since 1990.

== List of councillors ==
Seat	Councillor	Took office	Left office	Party	Election
1	George Watt	1978	1980	Conservative	1978
2	Ethel Davis	1978	1986	Conservative	1978, 1982
3	Harold Turner	1978	1990	Conservative	1978, 1982, 1986
1	William Perry	1980	1986	Conservative	1980, 1982
1	Kathryn Nicholls	1986	1989	Conservative	1986
2	Barry Edwards	1986	1990	Conservative	1986
1	Bridget Smith	1989	2002	Merton Park Residents	1989, 1990, 1994, 1998
2	Desmonde Child	1990	2002	Merton Park Residents	1990, 1994, 1998
3	Neville Beddoe	1990	1998	Merton Park Residents	1990, 1994
3	John Nelson-Jones	1998	2006	Merton Park Residents	1998, 2002
1	Jillian Ashton	2002	2006	Merton Park Residents	2002
2	Peter Southgate	2002	2022	Merton Park Residents	2002, 2006, 2010, 2014, 2018
1	Karin Forbes	2006	2014	Merton Park Residents	2006, 2010
3	Krysia Wiliams	2006	2010	Merton Park Residents	2006
3	John Sargeant	2010	2018	Merton Park Residents	2010, 2014
1	Edward Foley	2014	Incumbent	Merton Park Residents	2014, 2018, 2022
3	Dickie Wilkinson	2018	2022	Merton Park Residents	2018, 2022
2	Stephen Mercer	2022	Incumbent	Merton Park Residents	2022

== Summary ==
Councillors elected by party at each general borough election.

- Conservative
- Residents

== Merton council elections since 2022 ==
There was a revision of ward boundaries in Merton in 2022. The ward lost some territory in the north to Wimbledon Town and Dundonald and the number of councillors was reduced from three to two.

=== 2022 election ===
The election took place on 5 May 2022.

2022 Merton London Borough Council election: Merton Park (2)
Party	Candidate	Votes	%	±%
Merton Park Residents	Edward Foley	1,853	61.1	N/A
Merton Park Residents	Stephen Mercer	1,723	56.8	N/A
Labour	Deborah Chadwick	575	19.0	N/A
Labour	Alex Harris	498	16.4	N/A
Conservative	Abdul Latif	346	11.4	N/A
Conservative	Najeeb Latif	333	11.0	N/A
Liberal Democrats	Emma Maddison	293	9.7	N/A
Liberal Democrats	Christopher Oxford	177	5.8	N/A
Green	Keiren O'Brien	173	5.7	N/A
Turnout		3,031	50.2	
Merton Park Residents win (new boundaries)				
Merton Park Residents win (new boundaries)				

== 2002–2022 Merton council elections ==
Merton Park ward boundaries between 2002 and 2022

There was a revision of ward boundaries in Merton in 2002.

=== 2018 election ===
The election took place on 3 May 2018.

2018 Merton London Borough Council election: Merton Park
Party	Candidate	Votes	%	±%
Merton Park Residents	Peter Southgate	2,034	57.6	−4.0
Merton Park Residents	Edward Foley	1,981	56.1	−5.3
Merton Park Residents	Dickie Wilkinson	1,883	53.3	−10.4
Labour	Mervin Eubanks	644	18.2	+1.6
Labour	Liz Sherwood	622	17.6	+2.7
Labour	Michael Mannion	613	17.3	+2.4
Conservative	Andrew Cunningham	574	16.2	−0.8
Conservative	Alastair Gunn	547	15.5	−0.1
Conservative	Asher Ross	511	14.5	−1.0
Green	Rachel Brooks	360	10.2	N/A
Liberal Democrats	John Braithwaite	269	7.6	+3.3
Liberal Democrats	Stephen Harbron	186	5.3	+1.0
Liberal Democrats	Philip Ling	172	4.9	+1.4
Turnout		3,543	50	
Merton Park Residents hold		Swing		
Merton Park Residents hold		Swing		
Merton Park Residents hold		Swing		

=== 2014 election ===
The election took place on 22 May 2014.

2014 Merton London Borough Council election: Merton Park
Party	Candidate	Votes	%	±%
Merton Park Residents	John Sargeant	2,123	63.7	+13.5
Merton Park Residents	Peter Southgate	2,052	61.6	+11.5
Merton Park Residents	Edward Foley	2,047	61.4	+10.9
Conservative	David Cotterill	566	17.0	−10.1
Labour	Anthony Draper	552	16.6	−0.6
Conservative	Robert Lawrence	520	15.6	−7.7
Conservative	Nicholas Bustin	516	15.5	−6.5
Labour	Ross Savill	496	14.9	+2.2
Labour	Charles Ocansey	495	14.9	+1.5
Liberal Democrats	Duncan Burch	143	4.3	−9.4
Liberal Democrats	John Dalton	143	4.3	N/A
Liberal Democrats	Nazir Malik	115	3.5	N/A
Turnout			47.4	
Merton Park Residents hold		Swing		
Merton Park Residents hold		Swing		
Merton Park Residents hold		Swing		

=== 2010 election ===
2010 Merton London Borough Council election: Merton Park
Party	Candidate	Votes	%	±%
Merton Park Residents	Karin Forbes	2,538	50.5	+1.6
Merton Park Residents	John Sargeant	2,519	50.2	+2.9
Merton Park Residents	Peter Southgate	2,515	50.1	+1.4
Conservative	Pete Digger	1,359	27.1	−7.8
Conservative	Eleanor Sturge	1,170	23.3	−11.0
Conservative	Linda Taylor	1,106	22.0	−11.8
Labour	Christopher McKeon	862	17.2	+6.1
Liberal Democrats	Duncan Burch	690	13.7	+5.3
Labour	Charles Ocansey	671	13.4	+3.8
Labour	Teresa Ocansey	636	12.7	+3.7
UKIP	Graham Mills	227	4.5	+0.4
Turnout		5,021	72.2	
Merton Park Residents hold		Swing		
Merton Park Residents hold		Swing		
Merton Park Residents hold		Swing		

=== 2006 election ===
The election took place on 4 May 2006.

2006 Merton London Borough Council election: Merton Park
Party	Candidate	Votes	%	±%
Merton Park Residents	Karin Forbes	1,626	48.9	−5.3
Merton Park Residents	Peter Southgate	1,619	48.7	−2.7
Merton Park Residents	Krysia Wiliams	1,570	47.3	−3.9
Conservative	Simon Hooberman	1,159	34.9	+7.2
Conservative	Simon Manara	1,139	34.3	+7.9
Conservative	John Richardson	1,122	33.8	+7.9
Labour	Richard Nichols	370	11.1	−3.7
Labour	Carl Linkson	318	9.6	−3.9
Labour	Christopher Ostrowski	299	9.0	−3.8
Liberal Democrats	Maximilian Camplin	278	8.4	N/A
UKIP	Andrew Mills	136	4.1	−0.5
Turnout		3,322	48.9	+7.1
Merton Park Residents hold		Swing		
Merton Park Residents hold		Swing		
Merton Park Residents hold		Swing		

=== 2002 election ===
The election took place on 2 May 2002.

2002 Merton London Borough Council election: Merton Park
Party	Candidate	Votes	%	±%
Merton Park Residents	Jillian Ashton	1,499	54.2	
Merton Park Residents	Peter Southgate	1,420	51.4	
Merton Park Residents	John Nelson-Jones	1,415	51.2	
Conservative	David Edge	765	27.7	
Conservative	Richard Chellew	731	26.4	
Conservative	Richard Mernane	716	25.9	
Labour	Richard Nichols	409	14.8	
Labour	Michael Reddin	373	13.5	
Labour	Robert Powell	355	12.8	
Green	Naomi Adams	201	7.3	
UKIP	Andrew Mills	127	4.6	
Turnout		2,765	41.8	
Merton Park Residents win (new boundaries)				
Merton Park Residents win (new boundaries)				
Merton Park Residents win (new boundaries)				

== 1978–2002 Merton council elections ==
Merton Park ward boundaries between 1978 and 2002

=== 1998 election ===
The election on 7 May 1998 took place on the same day as the 1998 Greater London Authority referendum.

1998 Merton London Borough Council election: Merton Park
Party	Candidate	Votes	%	±%
Merton Park Residents	Desmonde Child	1,506	50.07	▼7.35
Merton Park Residents	Bridget Smith	1,496		
Merton Park Residents	John Nelson-Jones	1,413		
Conservative	Mark Coote	811	26.37	▲7.46
Conservative	Ronald Cox	775		
Conservative	Gavin Muncey	739		
Labour	Michael Fitzgerald	531	16.69	▼2.33
Labour	Aejaz Khan-Zada	473		
Labour	Roger Stephens	468		
Liberal Democrats	John O'Boyle	202	6.87	▲2.22
Registered electors		6,819		▲341
Turnout		2,929	42.95	▼9.89
Rejected ballots		8	0.27	▲0.15
Merton Park Residents hold		Swing		
Merton Park Residents hold		Swing		
Merton Park Residents hold		Swing		

=== 1994 election ===
The election took place on 5 May 1994.

1994 Merton London Borough Council election: Merton Park
Party	Candidate	Votes	%	±%
Merton Park Residents	Neville Beddoe	1,968	57.42	▲6.35
Merton Park Residents	Bridget Smith	1,948		
Merton Park Residents	Desmonde Child	1,944		
Labour	Edmond Ceci	667	19.02	▲2.15
Conservative	John Day	664	18.91	▼13.15
Labour	Alison Morgan	645		
Conservative	Christopher Dyson	633		
Conservative	Anne Sparrow	632		
Labour	Aeronwen Griffiths	628		
Liberal Democrats	William Prosser	158	4.65	New
Registered electors		6,478		▲113
Turnout		3,423	52.84	▼6.50
Rejected ballots		4	0.12	▲0.07
Merton Park Residents hold		Swing		
Merton Park Residents hold		Swing		
Merton Park Residents hold		Swing		

=== 1990 election ===
The election took place on 3 May 1990.

1990 Merton London Borough Council election: Merton Park
Party	Candidate	Votes	%	±%
Merton Park Residents	Bridget Smith	1,947		
Merton Park Residents	Desmonde Child	1,815		
Merton Park Residents	Neville Beddoe	1,805		
Conservative	Harold Turner	1,181		
Conservative	Anne Sparrow	1,174		
Conservative	John Day	1,141		
Labour	Patrick O'Sullivan	625		
Labour	Edmond Ceci	619		
Labour	Nicholas Morgan	594		
Turnout				
Merton Park Residents hold		Swing		
Merton Park Residents gain from Conservative		Swing		
Merton Park Residents gain from Conservative		Swing		

=== 1989 by-election ===
The by-election took place on 19 October 1989, following the resignation of Kathryn Nicholls. The Conservative Party held a majority of one on the council since the 1986 election. Bridget Smith stood on a platform of opposing the proposed Merton Relief Road.

1989 Merton Park by-election
Party	Candidate	Votes	%	±%
Merton Park Residents	Bridget Smith	1,436	41.7	
Conservative	James Smith	1,206	35.0	
Labour	Patrick O'Sullivan	805	23.4	
Turnout			52.9	
Merton Park Residents gain from Conservative		Swing		

=== 1986 election ===
The election took place on 8 May 1986.

1986 Merton London Borough Council election: Merton Park
Party	Candidate	Votes	%	±%
Conservative	Kathryn Nicholls	1,459		
Conservative	Barry Edwards	1,457		
Conservative	Harold Turner	1,390		
Labour	Betty Delaney	813		
Labour	Patrick O'Sullivan	786		
Alliance (SDP)	Kirsten Nielsen	768		
Alliance (SDP)	Christopher Skrebowski	751		
Labour	Edmond Ceci	738		
Alliance (SDP)	Peter Laub	733		
Turnout				
Conservative hold		Swing		
Conservative hold		Swing		
Conservative hold		Swing		

=== 1982 election ===
The election took place on 6 May 1982.

1982 Merton London Borough Council election: Merton Park
Party	Candidate	Votes	%	±%
Conservative	Ethel Davis	1,859		
Conservative	William Perry	1,798		
Conservative	Harold Turner	1,781		
Alliance (SDP)	Neil Rennie	822		
Alliance (SDP)	Kirsten Nielsen	816		
Alliance (SDP)	Peter Laub	769		
Labour	William Lean	393		
Labour	Patrick O'Sullivan	391		
Labour	Edmond Ceci	3iB		
Turnout				
Conservative hold		Swing		
Conservative hold		Swing		
Conservative hold		Swing		

=== 1980 by-election ===
The by-election took place on 8 May 1980, following the death of George Watt.

1980 Merton Park by-election
Party	Candidate	Votes	%	±%
Conservative	William Perry	1,513	55.7	
Labour	Patrick O'Sullivan	666	24.5	
Liberal	Andrew Trompeteler	449	16.5	
National Front	John Perryman	72	2.7	
Independent (Note: Public Safety, Democratic Monarchist, White Resident)	Bill Boaks	16	0.6	
Turnout			42.2	
Conservative hold		Swing		

=== 1978 election ===
The election took place on 4 May 1978.

1978 Merton London Borough Council election: Merton Park
Party	Candidate	Votes	%	±%
Conservative	George Watt	2,203		
Conservative	Ethel Davis	2,197		
Conservative	Harold Turner	2,139		
Labour	Edmond Ceci	609		
Labour	Merilyn Harris	601		
Labour	Patrick O'Sullivan	589		
Liberal	Harriet Knight	272		
Liberal	John Yeoumans	233		
Turnout				
Conservative win (new seat)				
Conservative win (new seat)				
Conservative win (new seat)				
