= Abbey (Merton ward) =

Electoral unit in the United Kingdom

- Electoral ward for the Merton London Borough Council
- Abbey ward boundaries since 2022
- Borough: Merton
- County: Greater London
- Population: 10,534 (2021) (Note: 2021 Census data reported for 2022 ward boundaries)
- Electorate: 7,396 (2022)
- Area: 1.376 square kilometres (0.531 sq mi)

Current electoral ward
- Created: 1978

Abbey is an electoral ward in the London Borough of Merton. The ward was first used in the 1978 elections. It returns councillors to Merton London Borough Council.

== Merton council elections since 2022 ==
There was a revision of ward boundaries in Merton in 2022.

=== 2022 election ===
The election took place on 5 May 2022.

2022 Merton London Borough Council election: Abbey
Party	Candidate	Votes	%	±%
Liberal Democrats	John Braithwaite	1,294	37.6	N/A
Labour	Mike Brunt	1,169	34.0	N/A
Liberal Democrats	Klaar Dresselaers	1,160	33.7	N/A
Liberal Democrats	Barry Smith	1,151	33.5	N/A
Labour	Karen Peck	1,133	32.9	N/A
Labour	Zak Dada	1,089	31.7	N/A
Conservative	Nigel Benbow	927	27.0	N/A
Conservative	Hayley Ormrod*	858	24.9	N/A
Conservative	Sivas Ranjan	796	23.1	N/A
Green	Peter Garrett	391	11.4	N/A
Turnout		3,439	46.5	
Liberal Democrats win (new boundaries)				
Labour win (new boundaries)				
Liberal Democrats win (new boundaries)				

== 2002–2022 Merton council elections ==
Abbey ward boundaries from 2002 to 2022

There was a revision of ward boundaries in Merton in 2002.

=== 2018 election ===
The election took place on 3 May 2018.

2018 Merton London Borough Council election: Abbey
Party	Candidate	Votes	%	±%
Labour	Eleanor Leslie Stringer	1,476	42.8	−5.1
Conservative	Nigel Charles Benbow	1,446	41.9	+7.1
Labour	Ben Butler	1,409	40.7	−7.1
Conservative	Emma-Louise Vetriano	1,399	40.6	+6.8
Conservative	Sivas Ranjan	1,383	40.1	+10.2
Labour	Dave Treanor	1,323	38.4	−8.1
Liberal Democrats	Matthew William Payne	547	15.9	+7.2
Liberal Democrats	Barry Smith	464	13.5	+7.3
Liberal Democrats	Panos Topalis	419	12.1	+7.1
TUSC	Piero Miloro	77	2.2	N/A
Turnout		3,458	45	
Labour hold		Swing		
Conservative gain from Labour		Swing		
Labour hold		Swing		

=== 2014 election ===
The election took place on 22 May 2014.

2014 Merton London Borough Council election: Abbey
Party	Candidate	Votes	%	±%
Labour	Abigail Jones	1,563	47.9	+15.6
Labour	Andrew Judge	1,560	47.8	+11.5
Labour	Katy Neep	1,519	46.5	+15.4
Conservative	Henry Nelless	1,136	34.8	−2.0
Conservative	Peter Smith	1,104	33.8	−5.8
Conservative	Cesar Sepulveda	975	29.9	−4.3
Green	David Wood	425	13.0	N/A
Liberal Democrats	Pauline Barry	284	8.7	−17.0
UKIP	Rathy Alagaratnam	259	7.9	N/A
Liberal Democrats	Richard Heinrich	202	6.2	−16.9
Liberal Democrats	John Tippett-Cooper	162	5.0	−17.4
Turnout		3,458	45	
Labour gain from Conservative		Swing		
Labour hold		Swing		
Labour gain from Conservative		Swing		

=== 2010 election ===
The election on 6 May 2010 took place on the same day as the United Kingdom general election.

2010 Merton London Borough Council election: Abbey
Party	Candidate	Votes	%	±%
Conservative	Diane Neil Mills	1,888	39.6	−1.6
Conservative	Henry Nelless	1,758	36.8	−1.7
Labour	Andrew Judge	1,733	36.3	−0.1
Conservative	Abdul Latif	1,634	34.2	−6.5
Labour	Pauline Cowper	1,542	32.3	−2.2
Labour	Emma Nye	1,484	31.1	−3.0
Liberal Democrats	Adam Towner	1,229	25.7	+7.7
Liberal Democrats	Mohammad Karim	1,103	23.1	+8.3
Liberal Democrats	Lesley Warne	1,068	22.4	+9.3
Turnout		4,773	66.3	
Conservative hold		Swing		
Conservative hold		Swing		
Labour gain from Conservative		Swing		

=== 2006 election ===
The election took place on 4 May 2006.

2006 Merton London Borough Council election: Abbey
Party	Candidate	Votes	%	±%
Conservative	Diane Neil Mills	1,297	41.2	+8.7
Conservative	Marc Hanson	1,282	40.7	+8.8
Conservative	Henry Nelless	1,214	38.5	+10.5
Labour	Susan Assinen	1,147	36.4	−3.5
Labour	Michael Brunt	1,087	34.5	−5.3
Labour	Laxmi Attawar	1,074	34.1	−2.9
Liberal Democrats	Pauline Barry	566	18.0	+1.4
Liberal Democrats	John Houilihan	470	14.9	−0.8
Green	Benjamin Walsh	443	14.1	+2.0
Liberal Democrats	David Willis	412	13.1	−0.4
Turnout		3,150	44.1	+16.7
Conservative gain from Labour		Swing		
Conservative gain from Labour		Swing		
Conservative gain from Labour		Swing		

=== 2002 election ===
The election took place on 2 May 2002.

2002 Merton London Borough Council election: Abbey
Party	Candidate	Votes	%	±%
Labour	Su Assinen	766	39.9	
Labour	Pauline Abrams	765	39.8	
Labour	Mick Fitzgerald	710	37.0	
Conservative	Stephen Ashcroft	644	33.5	
Conservative	Anne Bottell	613	31.9	
Conservative	Gordon Raymond	538	28.0	
Liberal Democrats	Catherine Brown	320	16.6	
Liberal Democrats	John O'Boyle	301	15.7	
Liberal Democrats	Celia Lee	260	13.5	
Green	Jacqueline Barrow	233	12.1	
Green	John Barrow	180	9.3	
Green	Conal Cunningham	166	8.6	
Turnout		1,927	27.4	
Labour win (new boundaries)				
Labour win (new boundaries)				
Labour win (new boundaries)				

== 1978–2002 Merton council elections ==
=== 1998 election ===
The election took place on 7 May 1998.

=== 1994 election ===
The election took place on 5 May 1994.

1994 Merton London Borough Council election: Abbey
Party	Candidate	Votes	%	±%
Labour	Maria Dingwall	1,717	44.37	▲2.55
Labour	Susan Assinen	1,643		
Labour	Adrian Holt	1,582		
Conservative	Anne Bottell	820	21.34	▼11.41
Conservative	Margaret Connon	795		
Conservative	Philip Thorley	761		
Green	Jacqueline Barrow	589	15.87	▲5.96
Liberal Democrats	Elizabeth Barker	382	8.70	▼0.69
Liberal Democrats	Gail Moss	331		
Liberal Democrats	Julian Rudd	257		
Independent	Monowara Ahmad	108	2.91	New
Independent	Grace Giddins	97	2.61	▲0.58
Independent	Muhammad Rahman	80	2.16	New
Independent	Abdul Kalam	76	2.05	New
Registered electors		6,944		▲30
Turnout		3,267	47.05	▼4.38
Rejected ballots		4	0.12	▼0.02
Labour hold				
Labour hold				
Labour hold				

=== 1990 election ===
The election took place on 3 May 1990.

1990 Merton London Borough Council election: Abbey
Party	Candidate	Votes	%
Labour	Marie-Louise de Villiers	1,769	46.92
Labour	Geoffrey Martin	1,665	
Labour	Ian Scott	1,620	
Conservative	Diana Harris	1,216	32.75
Conservative	Kenneth Butt	1,195	
Conservative	Philip Thorley	1,116	
Liberal Democrats	Pauline Barry	391	9.39
Green	Wendy Flood	320	8.91
Liberal Democrats	Leonard Harvey	315	
Liberal Democrats	Jean Spencer-Phillips	304	
Independent	Grace Giddins	73	2.03
Registered electors		6,914	
Turnout		3,556	51.43
Rejected ballots		5	0.14
Labour hold			
Labour hold			
Labour hold			

=== 1986 election ===
The election took place on 8 May 1986.

=== 1982 election ===
The election took place on 6 May 1982.

=== 1978 election ===
The election took place on 4 May 1978.
