= Merton London Borough Council elections =

Class of election in the United Kingdom

A map showing the wards of Merton since 2022

Merton London Borough Council in London, England is elected every four years; it has administrative control over the London Borough of Merton.

Since the last boundary changes in 2022, 57 councillors have been elected from 20 wards.

== List of council elections ==
Year	Labour	Conservative	Liberal Democrats (Note: Liberal Party, 1964–1978; SDP–Liberal Alliance, 1982–1986.)	MPWRA	LTRA	Council control after election
1964	26	25	0	—	3	No overall control
1968	4	46	0	—	4	Conservative
1971	29	21	0	—	4	Labour
1974	22	29	0	—	3	Conservative
1978 (Note: Boundary changes increased the number of seats by three.)	15	39	0	—	3	Conservative
1982	13	44	0	—	0	Conservative
1986	25	29	0	—	3	Conservative
1990	29	22	0	3	3	Labour
1994 (Note: Boundary changes took place but the number of seats remained the same. (Note: The Lambeth, Merton and Wandsworth (London Borough Boundaries) Order 1993))	40	10	3	3	1	Labour
1998 (Note: Boundary changes took place but the number of seats remained the same. (Note: The Croydon, Merton and Sutton (London Borough Boundaries) Order 1993))	39	12	3	3	0	Labour
2002 (Note: Boundary changes increased the number of seats by three.)	32	25	0	3	—	Labour
2006	27	30	0	3	—	No overall control
2010	28	27	2	3	—	No overall control
2014	36	20	1	3	—	Labour
2018	34	17	6	3	—	Labour
2022 (Note: Boundary changes reduced the number of seats by three.)	31	7	17	2	—	Labour
2026	32	4	19	2	—	Labour

== Borough result maps ==
1990 results map

2002 results map

2006 results map

2010 results map

2014 results map

2018 results map

2022 results map

2026 results map

== By-election results ==
=== 1964-1968 ===
There were no by-elections.

=== 1968-1971 ===
Wimbledon North by-election, 4 July 1968
Party	Candidate	Votes	%	±%
Conservative	L. Hirst	1741		
Liberal	G. A. Bloxam	748		
Labour	A. C. W. Holmes	429		
Turnout			27.9%	

Mitcham West by-election, 15 October 1970
Party	Candidate	Votes	%	±%
Labour	H. R. Veal	1235		
Conservative	P. E. Burcombe	540		
Liberal	P. H. E. Whiffin	208		
Communist	J. A. Court	56		
Independent	C. N. S. Killick	16		
Turnout			21.8%	

=== 1971-1974 ===
Wimbledon North by-election, 26 October 1972
Party	Candidate	Votes	%	±%
Conservative	M. J. Minto	1,898		
Liberal	L. A. Sawyer	766		
Labour	W. Daniels	695		
Turnout			29.4%	

Mitcham North by-election, 14 June 1973
Party	Candidate	Votes	%	±%
Labour	T. L. Harris	1,324		
Conservative	F. H. Meakings	1,287		
Liberal	P. C. Spratling	1,105		
Turnout			34.6%	

=== 1974-1978 ===
Wimbledon South by-election, 19 September 1974
Party	Candidate	Votes	%	±%
Conservative	Diana M. Harris	1,187		
Labour	Lester W. B. Augarde	1,119		
Liberal	Keith N. Searby	662		
Air Road Public Safety White Resident	Bill Boaks	13		
Turnout			34.2	
Conservative gain from Labour		Swing		

West Barnes by-election, 20 March 1975
Party	Candidate	Votes	%	±%
Conservative	Vincent Talbot	1,781		
Labour	Shirley E. Cornish	786		
Insurance Official	David W. Cotton	293		
Independent	Grace L. Giddins	38		
Air Road Public Safety White Resident	Bill Boaks	4		
Turnout			28.6	
Conservative hold		Swing		

Mitcham Central by-election, 8 May 1975
Party	Candidate	Votes	%	±%
Longthornton and Tamworth Residents	David J. Rogers	1,833		
Labour	Leslie A. Payne	1,248		
Liberal	Linda R. Pollard	463		
Council Tenants & Residents	Leonard Jenner	111		
Air Road Public Safety White Resident	Bill Boaks	12		
Turnout			35.8	
Longthornton and Tamworth Residents hold		Swing		

Cannon Hill by-election, 30 October 1975
Party	Candidate	Votes	%	±%
Liberal	Peggy Rowell	1,955		
Conservative	Anthony M. Owen	1,710		
Labour	Philip M. Jones	765		
Air Road Public Safety White Resident	Bill Boaks	7		
Turnout			45.5	
Liberal gain from Conservative		Swing		

Wimbledon West by-election, 27 November 1975
Party	Candidate	Votes	%	±%
Conservative	Sellen M. Somers	2,428		
Liberal	David Sawyer	1,203		
Labour	Christine M. Bickerstaff	303		
Air Road Public Safety White Resident	Bill Boaks	18		
Turnout			36.1	
Conservative hold		Swing		

=== 1978-1982 ===
Merton Park by-election, 8 May 1980
Party	Candidate	Votes	%	±%
Conservative	William J. Perry	1,513	55.7	
Labour	Patrick O'Sullivan	666	24.5	
Liberal	Andrew C. Trompeteler	449	16.5	
National Front	John R. Perryman	72	2.7	
Public Safety, Democratic Monarchist, White Resident	Bill Boaks	16	0.6	
Turnout			42.2	
Conservative hold		Swing		

The by-election was called following the death of Cllr George Watt.

Ravensbury by-election, 22 October 1981
Party	Candidate	Votes	%	±%
Alliance	Patricia M. Forster	1,300	41.9	
Labour	Nancy Bone	1,142	36.8	
Conservative	William P. Keen	661	21.3	
Turnout			44.8	
Alliance gain from Labour		Swing		

The by-election was called following the resignation of Cllr William Hillhouse.

=== 1982-1986 ===
Lower Morden by-election, 23 June 1983
Party	Candidate	Votes	%	±%
Conservative	Dennis V. Taylor	1,470	52.4	
Alliance	Edward B. Baillie	782	27.9	
Labour	Irene M. Miles	555	19.8	
Turnout			40.7	
Conservative hold		Swing		

The by-election was called following the resignation of Cllr Peter Glasspool.

Longthornton by-election, 15 March 1984
Party	Candidate	Votes	%	±%
Longthornton and Tamworth Residents	Terry E. Ellis	735	29.1	
Conservative	Colin F. Nixson	728	28.9	
Labour	Irene M. Miles	624	24.7	
Alliance	Michael Goldstone	435	17.2	
Turnout			35.2	
Longthornton and Tamworth Residents gain from Conservative		Swing		

The by-election was called following the death of Cllr Michael Page.

Ravensbury by-election, 15 March 1984
Party	Candidate	Votes	%	±%
Labour	Paul B. Martin	1,674	55.6	
Conservative	Veronica J. Brooke	833	27.7	
Alliance	Edward B. Baillie	504	16.7	
Turnout			44.0	
Labour hold		Swing		

The by-election was called following the resignation of Cllr Nancy Bone.

Lower Morden by-election, 14 June 1984
Party	Candidate	Votes	%	±%
Conservative	Alan W. Hemsley	1,440	51.7	
Labour	Alvin W. Biddulph	718	25.8	
Alliance	Ronald A. Locke	628	22.5	
Turnout			40.8	
Conservative hold		Swing		

The by-election was called following the resignation of Cllr Robert Dilley.

=== 1986-1990 ===
Pollards Hill by-election, 19 March 1987
Party	Candidate	Votes	%	±%
Conservative	Barbara J. Mansfield	2,017	50.5	
Labour	Slim Flegg	1,223	30.6	
Alliance	Patricia E. Pearce	752	18.8	
Turnout			62.3	
Conservative hold		Swing		

The by-election was called following the death of Cllr James Garwood.

Hillside by-election, 11 June 1987
Party	Candidate	Votes	%	±%
Conservative	Stephen J. Ashcroft	2,653	53.8	
Alliance	Hugh Liversedge	1,706	34.6	
Labour	William Bailey	753	11.6	
Turnout			74.2	
Conservative hold		Swing		

The by-election was called following the death of Cllr David Mason.

Cannon Hill by-election, 26 November 1987
Party	Candidate	Votes	%	±%
Conservative	John J. Ratcliffe	1,711	57.0	
Labour	Paula A. Burnett	990	33.0	
Alliance	Neil R. Rennie	300	10.0	
Turnout			43.3	
Conservative hold		Swing		

The by-election was called following the resignation of Cllr David Williams.

Merton Park by-election, 19 October 1989
Party	Candidate	Votes	%	±%
Merton Park RA	Bridget G. Smith	1,436	41.7	
Conservative	James E. Smith	1206	35.0	
Labour	Patrick R. O'Sullivan	805	23.4	
Turnout			52.9	
Merton Park RA gain from Conservative		Swing		

The by-election was called following the resignation of Cllr Kathryn Nicholls. The result meant that the Conservatives lost their one-seat majority on the council, placing the council under no overall control until the next election. Since this by-election, the Conservatives have yet to win back majority control of the council. This was the first election ever contested by the Merton Park Ward Residents Association, which had run in opposition to the council's proposed extension of the A24 relief road.

=== 1990-1994 ===
West Barnes by-election, 1 October 1992
Party	Candidate	Votes	%	±%
Conservative	Michael F. Troy	1,250	41.1	
Labour	Steven G. Conquest	931	30.6	
Liberal Democrats	Alison L. Willott	558	18.4	
Independent Resident	Roger I. Logan	225	7.4	
Green	Jacqueline L. Barrow	76	2.5	
Turnout			43.6	
Conservative hold		Swing		

The by-election was called following the resignation of Cllr Michael Menhinick.

=== 1994-1998 ===
Figge's Marsh by-election, 16 March 1995
Party	Candidate	Votes	%	±%
Labour	Andrew J. Judge	1,403	58.5	
Conservative	Selvin Brown	825	34.4	
Liberal Democrats	Marc J.-Y. Plessier	109	4.5	
Green	Rajeev K. Thacker	61	2.5	
Turnout				
Labour hold		Swing		

The by-election was called following the death of Cllr David Proctor.

Durnsford by-election, 29 June 1995
Party	Candidate	Votes	%	±%
Labour	Joyce G. Paton	700	42.5	
Conservative	Jean A. Fortescue	552	33.5	
Liberal Democrats	Stephen K. Harbron	302	18.3	
Green	Rajeen K. Thacker	94	5.7	
Turnout				
Labour hold		Swing		

The by-election was called following the death of Cllr Arthur Kennedy.

=== 1998-2002 ===
Lower Morden by-election, 15 June 2000
Party	Candidate	Votes	%	±%
Conservative	Maurice H. Groves	1,033	59.9	+11.9
Labour	Michael A. Fitzgerald	470	27.3	−8.1
Liberal Democrats	Heather M. Hurst	148	8.6	−3.4
Green	Giles T. Barrow	73	4.2	−0.4
Majority		563	32.6	
Turnout		1,724	25.5	
Conservative hold		Swing		

The by-election was called following the resignation of Cllr Terence Daniels.

West Barnes by-election, 9 November 2000
Party	Candidate	Votes	%	±%
Conservative	Gillian V. Lewis-Lavender	984	49.5	+24.3
Liberal Democrats	Heather M. Hurst	723	36.4	−5.6
Labour	Tony R. Giles	279	14.0	−14.3
Majority		261	13.1	
Turnout		1,986	27.8	
Conservative gain from Liberal Democrats		Swing		

The by-election was called following the resignation of Cllr Jennifer Willott.

=== 2002-2006 ===
Ravensbury by-election, 6 March 2003
Party	Candidate	Votes	%	±%
Labour	Stephen Alambritis	1,014	46.4	−0.9
Conservative	Barbara J. Mansfield	942	43.1	+15.0
UKIP	Adrian K. J. Roberts	116	5.3	+5.3
Green	Richard M. Evans	112	5.1	−4.8
Majority		72	3.3	
Turnout		2,184	33.7	
Labour hold		Swing		

The by-election was called following the resignation of Cllr Tony Giles.

Lower Morden by-election, 10 June 2004
Party	Candidate	Votes	%	±%
Conservative	Ronald W. Wilson	1,401	49.9	+4.3
Labour	Terence J. Daniels	576	20.5	−2.1
UKIP	Adrian Roberts	392	14.0	+1.3
Liberal Democrats	Lina Akbar	262	9.3	−2.1
Green	Giles T. Barrow	175	6.2	−1.5
Majority		825	29.4	
Turnout		2,806	43.9	
Conservative hold		Swing		

The by-election was called following the resignation of Cllr Leslie Mutch.

=== 2006-2010 ===
There were no by-elections.

=== 2010-2014 ===
Wimbledon Park by-election, 3 May 2012
Party	Candidate	Votes	%	±%
Conservative	Linda Taylor	1,837	47.6	
Labour	Louise Deegan	931	24.1	
Liberal Democrats	Dave Busby	838	21.7	
Green	Richmond Crowhurst	253	6.6	
Turnout			48.0	
Conservative hold		Swing		

The by-election was called following the resignation of Cllr Tariq Ahmad.

Colliers Wood by-election, 8 August 2013
Party	Candidate	Votes	%	±%
Labour	Caroline Cooper-Marbiah	1,685	72.2	
Conservative	Peter Lord	441	18.9	
UKIP	Shafqat Janjua	157	6.7	
Liberal Democrats	Phil Ling	52	2.2	
Turnout			29.9	
Labour hold		Swing		

The by-election was called following the death of Cllr Gam Gurung.

=== 2014-2018 ===
St Helier by-election, 19 May 2016
Party	Candidate	Votes	%	±%
Labour	Jerome Neil	1,436	71.0	+11.5
Conservative	Susan Edwards	282	13.9	−1.0
UKIP	Richard Hilton	191	9.4	−10.2
Liberal Democrats	Asif Ashraf	59	2.9	−3.1
Green	John Barraball	55	2.7	N/A
Majority		1,154	57.1	
Turnout		2,030		
Labour hold		Swing		

The by-election was triggered by the death of Cllr Maxi Martin of the Labour Party.

St Helier by-election, 20 July 2017
Party	Candidate	Votes	%	±%
Labour	Kelly Braund	1,508	74.1	+3.1
Conservative	Geraldine Kirby	318	15.6	+1.7
Liberal Democrats	Geoff Cooper	98	4.8	+1.9
Green	Phillip Maslin	61	3.0	+0.3
UKIP	Bob Grahame	50	2.5	−6.9
Majority		1,190	58.4	
Turnout		2,035	24.9	
Labour hold		Swing		

The by-election was triggered by the resignation of Cllr Imran Uddin of the Labour Party.

=== 2018-2022 ===
Cannon Hill by-election, 20 June 2019
Party	Candidate	Votes	%	±%
Liberal Democrats	Jenifer Gould	1,060	35.0	+24.3
Labour	Ryan Barnett	876	28.9	−13.9
Conservative	Michael Paterson	867	28.6	−14.2
Green	Susie O'Connor	158	5.2	+5.2
UKIP	Andrew Mills	68	2.2	−1.4
Majority		184	6.1	
Turnout		2,030	41.8	
Liberal Democrats gain from Labour		Swing	+19.1	

The by-election was triggered by the resignation of Cllr Mark Kenny of the Labour Party.

St. Helier by-election, 6 May 2021
Party	Candidate	Votes	%	±%
Labour	Helena Dollimore	1,859	54.4	
Conservative	Isaac Frimpong	907	26.6	
Green	Pippa Maslin	409	12.0	
Liberal Democrats	Simon Jones	241	7.1	
Majority		952		
Turnout		3,416	41.4	
Labour hold		Swing		

The by-election was triggered by the resignation of Cllr Kelly Braund of the Labour Party.

=== 2022-2026 ===
Figge's Marsh by-election, 4 July 2024
Party	Candidate	Votes	%	±%
Labour	Franca Ofeimu	2,529	66.1	
Green	Sally Pannifex	515	13.5	
Conservative	Suzanne Grocott	509	13.3	
Liberal Democrats	William Woodward	272	7.1	
Majority		2,014	52.7	
Turnout		3,825		
Labour hold		Swing		

The by-election was triggered by the resignation of Cllr Natasha Irons of the Labour Party.

St Helier by-election, 4 July 2024
Party	Candidate	Votes	%	±%
Labour	Shuile Syeda	1,865	47.9	
Green	Pippa Maslin	872	22.4	
Conservative	Gillian Lewis-Lavender	687	17.6	
Liberal Democrats	Asif Ashraf	471	12.1	
Majority		993	25.5	
Turnout		3,896		
Labour hold		Swing		

The by-election was triggered by the resignation of Cllr Helena Dollimore of the Labour Party.
