= 1994 Merton London Borough Council election =

1994 local election in England

- 5 May 1994

All 57 council seats up for election to Merton London Borough Council 29 seats needed for a majority
- Registered: 127,884
- Turnout: 63,321, 49.51% (▼4.15%)

	First party	Second party
Leader	Anthony J. Colman	Unknown
Party	Labour	Conservative
Leader since	1991	Unknown
Leader's seat	Lavender	Unknown
Last election	29 seats, 42.22%	22 seats, 41.27%
Seats won	40	10
Seat change	▲11	▼12
Popular vote	82,294	51,153
Percentage	48.52%	30.16%
Swing	▲6.30	▼11.11
	Third party	Fourth party
Leader	Unknown	Unknown
Party	Liberal Democrats	Merton Park RA
Leader since	Unknown	Unknown
Leader's seat	Unknown	Unknown
Last election	0 seats, 6.47%	3 seats, 3.07%
Seats won	3	3
Seat change	▲3	Steady
Popular vote	20,540	5,860
Percentage	12.11%	3.46%
Swing	▲5.64	▲0.39
	Fifth party
Leader	Robert B. Elgin (Note: Elgin is the defacto leader as he is the only councillor the party has)
Party	Longthornton and Tamworth Residents
Leader since	1994
Leader's seat	Longthornton
Last election	3 seats, 2.11%
Seats won	1
Seat change	▼2
Popular vote	4,308
Percentage	2.54%
Swing	▲0.43
Council leader before election
Labour
Council leader after election
Labour

Elections for the London Borough of Merton were held on 5 May 1994 to elect members of Merton London Borough Council in London, England. This was on the same day as other local elections in England.

The whole council was up for election. As a result of changes in authority boundaries between Merton, Lambeth and Wandsworth, there were some minor ward boundary changes.

== Results ==
The Labour Party maintained its majority control of the council, increasing its majority from one seat to eleven seats.

This was the first election in which the Liberal Democrats gained seats in Merton, winning all three seats on the ward of West Barnes from the Conservatives. The Liberal Democrats had not stood in the ward in the last election, and their predecessors, the SDP-Liberal Alliance, came last in the ward in the 1986 election, behind the Conservatives and Labour.

This was also the last election which was contested by the Longthornton and Tamworth Residents Association, which lost two seats to Labour and whose only elected councillor no longer sat for the party by the time of the 1998 election.

Merton local election result 1994
Party	Seats	Gains	Losses	Net gain/loss	Seats %	Votes %	Votes	+/−
Labour	40	11	0	▲11	70.18	48.52	82,294	▲6.30
Conservative	10	0	12	▼12	17.54	30.16	51,153	▼11.11
Liberal Democrats	3	3	0	▲3	5.26	12.11	20,540	▲5.64
Merton Park RA	3	0	0	Steady	5.26	3.46	5,860	▲0.39
Longthornton and Tamworth Residents	1	0	2	▼2	1.75	2.54	4,308	▲0.43
Green	0	0	0	Steady	0.00	2.46	4,177	▼0.36
Independent	0	0	0	Steady	0.00	0.54	914	▲0.03
West Barnes Independent Residents	0	0	0	Steady	0.00	0.17	286	▼1.36
Monster Raving Loony	0	0	0	Steady	0.00	0.04	63	New
Total	57						169,595	

== Ward results ==
(*) - Indicates an incumbent candidate

(†) - Indicates an incumbent candidate standing in a different ward

=== Abbey ===
Abbey (3)
Party	Candidate	Votes	%	±%
Labour	Maria P. Dingwall^{†} (Note: Dingwall was a sitting councillor representing the Pollards Hill)	1,717	44.37	▲2.55
Labour	Susan Assinen	1,643		
Labour	Adrian P. Holt	1,582		
Conservative	Anne M. Bottell	820	21.34	▼11.41
Conservative	Margaret A. Connon	795		
Conservative	Philip N. Thorley	761		
Green	Jacqueline L. Barrow	589	15.87	▲5.96
Liberal Democrats	Elizabeth J. Barker	382	8.70	▼0.69
Liberal Democrats	Gail Moss	331		
Liberal Democrats	Julian D. Rudd	257		
Independent	Monowara Ahmad	108	2.91	New
Independent	Grace L. Giddins	97	2.61	▲0.58
Independent	Muhammad M. Rahman	80	2.16	New
Independent	Abdul Kalam	76	2.05	New
Registered electors		6,944		▲30
Turnout		3,267	47.05	▼4.38
Rejected ballots		4	0.12	▼0.02
Labour hold				
Labour hold				
Labour hold				

=== Cannon Hill ===
Cannon Hill (3)
Party	Candidate	Votes	%	±%
Labour	Michael Mannion	1,631	46.35	▲8.98
Labour	Charles Lucas	1,611		
Labour	Brian White	1,608		
Conservative	Thelma T. Earnshaw*	1,195	33.16	▼15.87
Conservative	Joan Pethen*	1,146		
Conservative	Pauline Blythe	1,130		
Liberal Democrats	Peter Larkin	556	15.19	▲1.59
Liberal Democrats	Anne-Marie Anderson	533		
Liberal Democrats	George L. Senior	502		
Green	Justin W. Craig	185	5.30	New
Registered electors		6,630		▼58
Turnout		3,547	53.50	▼6.16
Rejected ballots		3	0.08	▼0.10
Labour gain from Conservative				
Labour gain from Conservative				
Labour gain from Conservative				

=== Colliers Wood ===
Colliers Wood (3)
Party	Candidate	Votes	%	±%
Labour	Siobhain A. McDonagh*	2,202	52.16	▼2.75
Labour	Sheila Knight*	1,945		
Labour	Reginald Flegg*	1,901		
Green	Thomas J. Walsh	896	23.18	▲2.73
Conservative	Christopher S. Grayling	568	13.87	▼10.78
Conservative	Margaret Ali	554		
Conservative	Shamima S. Hardcastle	486		
Liberal Democrats	Malcolm T. Geldart	417	10.79	New
Registered electors		7,584		▲135
Turnout		3,434	45.28	▼0.50
Rejected ballots		8	0.23	▼0.03
Labour hold				
Labour hold				
Labour hold				

=== Dundonald ===
Dundonald (3)
Party	Candidate	Votes	%	±%
Labour	Michael A. Brunt*	1,822	49.60	▲10.44
Labour	Stephen J. Blann	1,808		
Labour	John S. Pickover	1,599		
Conservative	John A. Elvidge*	1,045	28.40	▼6.56
Conservative	Samantha L. George	996		
Conservative	Robert S. Greenly	953		
Liberal Democrats	Matthew L. Griffiths	440	11.87	▲2.63
Liberal Democrats	Richard J. Ladmore	420		
Liberal Democrats	Graham A. Stone	390		
Green	Christina M. Langley	356	10.13	▼6.51
Registered electors		6,135		▲20
Turnout		3,437	56.02	▼3.72
Rejected ballots		5	0.15	▼0.04
Labour hold				
Labour hold				
Labour gain from Conservative				

=== Durnsford ===
Durnsford (2)
Party	Candidate	Votes	%	±%
Labour	Arthur M. Kennedy	1,055	45.03	▲8.39
Labour	Kevin A. Beale	1,027		
Conservative	Robert J. Clark	824	35.64	▼8.23
Conservative	Jean A. Fortescue	824		
Liberal Democrats	Philip C. Rumney	318	13.45	▲1.73
Liberal Democrats	Barry A. Fairbank	303		
Green	Julia Garrett	136	5.88	▼2.89
Registered electors		4,283		▲218
Turnout		2,349	54.84	▼4.79
Rejected ballots		4	0.17	▲0.05
Labour gain from Conservative				
Labour gain from Conservative				

=== Figge's Marsh ===
Figge's Marsh (3)
Party	Candidate	Votes	%	±%
Labour	David R. Proctor*	2,003	55.23	▲3.95
Labour	Daniel F. Connellan*	1,953		
Labour	Geraldine P. Stanford*	1,938		
Conservative	Nigel T.V. Dixon	1,075	29.23	▼8.96
Conservative	Selvin Brown	1,054		
Conservative	Suresh Pandya	991		
Liberal Democrats	Antoinette McCabe	338	9.50	New
Green	Francis E.R. Cluer	215	6.04	▼4.49
Registered electors		7,347		▲156
Turnout		3,575	48.66	▼5.62
Rejected ballots		7	0.20	▼0.05
Labour hold				
Labour hold				
Labour hold				

=== Graveney ===
Graveney (2)
Party	Candidate	Votes	%	±%
Labour	Linda C. Kirby*	1,331	64.66	▼5.25
Labour	Joseph B. Abrams*	1,262		
Conservative	Hazel A. McDonald	439	20.84	▼9.25
Conservative	Margaret G. Sheldrick	397		
Liberal Democrats	Jonathan P. Snelling	231	10.72	New
Liberal Democrats	Marc J-Y. Plessier	199		
Green	Mary Wensley	76	3.79	New
Registered electors		4,245		▼21
Turnout		2,119	49.92	▼0.64
Rejected ballots		9	0.42	▼0.18
Labour hold				
Labour hold				

=== Hillside ===
Hillside (3)
Party	Candidate	Votes	%	±%
Conservative	James D.R. Holmes	1,360	45.71	▼5.73
Conservative	Jason R. Garbutt	1,352		
Conservative	David T. Williams*	1,350		
Labour	Christine M. Bickerstaff	879	28.63	▲8.35
Labour	William Bailey	871		
Labour	Laurence G. North	793		
Liberal Democrats	Louise N. Pugh	550	18.23	▲5.01
Liberal Democrats	Blaise C. Eglington	539		
Liberal Democrats	Joan W. Pyke-Lees	530		
Green	Richard J. Miller	220	7.43	▼7.63
Registered electors		6,683		▲231
Turnout		2,936	43.93	▼7.82
Rejected ballots		5	0.17	▲0.17
Conservative hold				
Conservative hold				
Conservative hold				

=== Lavender ===
Lavender (2)
Party	Candidate	Votes	%	±%
Labour	Anthony J. Colman*	1,547	68.88	▼3.07
Labour	Malcolm R. Searle^{†} (Note: Searle was a sitting councillor representing the Longthornton ward. Searle was elected initially as a Longthornton and Tamworth Residents Association councillor)	1,401		
Conservative	Gordon H. Raymond	424	18.83	▼9.22
Conservative	Dorothy G. Truman	382		
Liberal Democrats	Wendy Taylor	275	12.29	New
Liberal Democrats	Patrick F. Macgabhann	251		
Registered electors		5,067		▲1,081
Turnout		2,326	45.90	▼4.65
Rejected ballots		7	0.30	▲0.20
Labour hold				
Labour hold				

=== Longthornton ===
Longthornton (3)
Party	Candidate	Votes	%	±%
Labour	Patric J. Cunnane	1,474	39.24	▲6.52
Longthornton and Tamworth Residents	Robert B. Elgin*	1,450	39.77	▲0.59
Labour	Steven D. Holt	1,437		
Longthornton and Tamworth Residents	Gillian Elgin*	1,430		
Longthornton and Tamworth Residents	Terry E. Ellis	1,428		
Labour	Mohammad A. Syed	1,341		
Conservative	Richard J. Gill	574	14.43	▼13.67
Conservative	Ayman Akshar	500		
Conservative	Harris Yee-Chong	489		
Liberal Democrats	Caroline A. Plessier	237	6.56	New
Registered electors		7,252		▼44
Turnout		3,709	51.14	▲2.62
Rejected ballots		5	0.13	▼0.01
Labour gain from Longthornton and Tamworth Residents				
Longthornton and Tamworth Residents hold				
Labour gain from Longthornton and Tamworth Residents				

=== Lower Morden ===
Lower Morden (3)
Party	Candidate	Votes	%	±%
Labour	Cyril L. Gallant	1,417	39.13	▲2.37
Labour	Nicholas G. Draper	1,365		
Conservative	Janet Jones*	1,351	37.44	▼13.84
Conservative	Terence J. Daniels	1,347		
Labour	Mark H. Springett	1,310		
Conservative	Peter J. Morss*	1,217		
Liberal Democrats	Patricia E. Pearce	529	15.17	New
Green	Susan N. Boulding	288	8.26	▼3.70
Registered electors		6,662		▼50
Turnout		3,316	49.77	▼7.84
Rejected ballots		2	0.06	▼0.22
Labour gain from Conservative				
Labour gain from Conservative				
Conservative hold				

=== Merton Park ===
Merton Park (3)
Party	Candidate	Votes	%	±%
Merton Park RA	Neville E. Beddoe*	1,968	57.42	▲6.35
Merton Park RA	Bridget G. Smith*	1,948		
Merton Park RA	Desmonde E.T. Child*	1,944		
Labour	Edmond H. Ceci	667	19.02	▲2.15
Conservative	John L. Day	664	18.91	▼13.15
Labour	Alison W. Morgan	645		
Conservative	Christopher P. Dyson	633		
Conservative	Anne Sparrow	632		
Labour	Aeronwen J. Griffiths	628		
Liberal Democrats	William A. Prosser	158	4.65	New
Registered electors		6,478		▲113
Turnout		3,423	52.84	▼6.50
Rejected ballots		4	0.12	▲0.07
Merton Park RA hold				
Merton Park RA hold				
Merton Park RA hold				

=== Phipps Bridge ===
Phipps Bridge (3)
Party	Candidate	Votes	%	±%
Labour	Thomas I. Munn	2,019	59.60	▲9.02
Labour	Paul Harper*	2,015		
Labour	Judith C. Saunders	1,844		
Conservative	Nicholas E. Brewer	740	20.84	▼9.64
Conservative	Oliver N. Colvile	679		
Conservative	Vivianne J. Pallister	635		
Liberal Democrats	Lorraine J. Snelling	377	9.67	▼0.05
Independent	Richard Law	325	9.89	▲0.67
Liberal Democrats	Konrad Brodzinski	298		
Liberal Democrats	Marek Siemaszko	279		
Registered electors		7,731		▲50
Turnout		3,453	44.66	▼2.46
Rejected ballots		5	0.14	▼0.05
Labour hold				
Labour hold				
Labour hold				

=== Pollards Hill ===
Pollards Hill (3)
Party	Candidate	Votes	%	±%
Labour	Frederick W.C. Flatt*	1,885	60.55	+14.3
Labour	John H. Cole	1,864		
Labour	Patrick Tiernan	1,579		
Conservative	Beryl J. Akshar	731	23.15	−15.2
Conservative	Kevin J. Shinkwin	681		
Conservative	Abdul H. Kanso	624		
Liberal Democrats	Patrick A. Howard	478	16.30	New
Registered electors		6,203		▼231
Turnout		3,031	48.86	▼4.57
Rejected ballots		9	0.30	▲0.04
Labour hold				
Labour hold				
Labour gain from Conservative				

=== Ravensbury ===
Ravensbury (3)
Party	Candidate	Votes	%	±%
Labour	Philip M. Jones*	2,040	60.04	▲2.07
Labour	Peter J. Smith	1,990		
Labour	Peter J. McCabe*	1,987		
Conservative	Stephen J. Ashcroft	623	17.39	▼9.38
Conservative	Thomas O.C. Harris	585		
Conservative	Michael F. Troy	535		
Liberal Democrats	Philip S. Knight	393	11.76	▲4.16
Green	Julian Davidson	210	6.29	▲0.63
Independent	Terence J. Sullivan	88	2.63	New
Monster Raving Loony	Doris M. Wright	63	1.89	New
Registered electors		6,536		▼50
Turnout		3,187	48.76	▼4.98
Rejected ballots		6	0.19	▲0.08
Labour hold				
Labour hold				
Labour hold				

=== Raynes Park ===
Raynes Park (3)
Party	Candidate	Votes	%	±%
Conservative	Margaret A. Brierly	1,482	43.13	▼7.96
Conservative	Robert S.K. Bell	1,411		
Conservative	Michael G. Miles	1,383		
Labour	Sandra E.M. Thorogood	1,067	30.08	▲4.37
Labour	Michael J. Mroczek	962		
Labour	Mark A. Vines-Forman	954		
Liberal Democrats	Nicola J. Savile-Tucker	664	19.67	▲9.05
Liberal Democrats	David P. Hurst	647		
Liberal Democrats	Kevin McGuinness	639		
Green	Andrew S. Taylor	235	7.11	▼5.47
Registered electors		7,130		▲154
Turnout		3,304	46.34	▼7.90
Rejected ballots		6	0.18	▲0.13
Conservative hold				
Conservative hold				
Conservative hold				

=== St. Helier ===
St. Helier (3)
Party	Candidate	Votes	%	±%
Labour	Alec Leaver*	1,994	61.35	▲4.94
Labour	Steven G. Conquest	1,860		
Labour	Michael A. Spacey	1,797		
Conservative	Keith W.A. Guy	745	22.92	▼9.88
Conservative	Michael P. McGrory	716		
Conservative	John Telford	650		
Liberal Democrats	Susan A.E. Simmonds	346	10.16	New
Liberal Democrats	Nicholas R.G. Wren	303		
Liberal Democrats	Ademola O. Akinmade	288		
Green	Stephen C. Boulding	171	5.57	▼5.22
Registered electors		6,381		▼144
Turnout		3,202	50.18	▼3.89
Rejected ballots		2	0.06	▼0.11
Labour hold				
Labour hold				
Labour hold				

=== Trinity ===
Trinity (3)
Party	Candidate	Votes	%	±%
Labour	Kingsley J. Abrams*	1,519	43.73	▲6.32
Labour	Patrick R. O'Sullivan	1,433		
Labour	Paul D.L. Barasi	1,427		
Conservative	Richard Aitken-Davies	981	28.60	▼1.88
Conservative	Diana M. Harris	942		
Conservative	Simon J. Elliott	941		
Liberal Democrats	Suzanne Deeley	590	16.71	▼3.19
Liberal Democrats	Anthony A.W. Dix	543		
Liberal Democrats	Neil R. Rennie	540		
Green	Sarah J. Miskin	226	6.77	▼5.44
Independent	Mohammad A. Karim	140	4.19	New
Registered electors		5,688		▼44
Turnout		3,239	56.94	▲2.77
Rejected ballots		3	0.09	▲0.06
Labour hold				
Labour hold				
Labour hold				

=== Village ===
Village (3)
Party	Candidate	Votes	%	±%
Conservative	Roger A. Farrance	1,551	56.66	▼1.82
Conservative	Sarah L. Newton	1,544		
Conservative	Allan H. Jones*	1,502		
Liberal Democrats	Elizabeth M.G. Robins	583	19.45	▲7.21
Liberal Democrats	Marilyn H. Rumney	516		
Labour	Denise M. Leggett	494	17.57	▲2.03
Labour	Duncan Michael	485		
Liberal Democrats	Richard K. Tibbetts	479		
Labour	Sittampalam D. Balarajah	446		
Green	Margaret A. Garrett	171	6.32	▼7.42
Registered electors		5,929		▲19
Turnout		2,663	44.91	▼8.05
Rejected ballots		1	0.04	▼0.03
Conservative hold				
Conservative hold				
Conservative hold				

=== West Barnes ===
West Barnes (3)
Party	Candidate	Votes	%	±%
Liberal Democrats	Alison L. Willott	1,386	33.76	New
Liberal Democrats	Iain D.StC Dysart	1,330		
Liberal Democrats	Nicholas P. Harris	1,275		
Labour	Laurence J. Naylor	1,093	27.23	▼2.90
Labour	Barry L.T. Edwards	1,083		
Conservative	Margaret A. Grant	1,066	26.60	▼18.98
Conservative	Paul A. Hannan	1,052		
Labour	Stephen K. Nixon	1,044		
Conservative	Kenneth M. Butt	1,026		
Independent	Roger I. Logan	286	7.26	New
Green	Jennifer H. Barrow	203	5.15	New
Registered electors		6,976		▲35
Turnout		3,804	54.53	▼2.96
Rejected ballots		4	0.11	▲0.03
Liberal Democrats gain from Conservative				
Liberal Democrats gain from Conservative				
Liberal Democrats gain from Conservative				
