= 1990 Merton London Borough Council election =

1990 local election in England

- 3 May 1990

All 57 council seats up for election to Merton London Borough Council 29 seats needed for a majority
- Registered: 126,284
- Turnout: 67,764, 53.66%

	First party	Second party
Party	Labour	Conservative
Seats before	25	27
Seats won	29	22
Seat change	▲4	▼7
Popular vote	76,583	74,857
Percentage	42.22%	41.27%
	Third party	Fourth party
Party	Merton Park RA	Longthornton and Tamworth Residents
Seats before	0	3
Seats won	3	3
Seat change	▲3	Steady
Popular vote	5,567	3,822
Percentage	3.07%	2.11%
	Fifth party
Party	Liberal Democrats
Seats before	0
Seats won	0
Seat change	Steady
Popular vote	11,741
Percentage	6.47%
- Map of the results of the 1990 Merton London Borough council election.
Council leader before election
John Elvidge
Conservative
Council leader after election
Geoff Smith
Labour

Elections for the London Borough of Merton were held on 3 May 1990 to elect members of Merton London Borough Council in London, England. This was on the same day as other local elections in England and Scotland.

The whole council was up for election and the Labour Party gained overall control of the council from the Conservatives with a majority of one seat.

== Background ==
At the last election, the Conservatives had gained a majority of one seat. In October 1989, they lost a by-election in Merton Park to Bridget Smith of the Merton Park Ward Residents Association, which had contested the by-election in opposition to the proposed extension of the A24 relief road. This by-election result hung the council, but the Conservatives continued to govern Merton as a minority administration.

This was the first whole council election which was contested by the MPWRA.

== Results ==
The Conservatives lost their one-seat overall majority of the council to Labour, who themselves gained a one-seat overall majority of the council. The Merton Park Ward Residents Association won all three seats in Merton Park from the Conservatives; they have since maintained these seats in subsequent elections.

Merton local election result 1990 (Note: The Liberal Democrat vote count includes three candidates who stood in Phipps Bridge under the description of "Liberal Democrat Focus Team".)
Party	Seats	Gains	Losses	Net gain/loss	Seats %	Votes %	Votes	+/−
Labour	29	4	0	▲4	50.88	42.22	76,583	
Conservative	22	0	7	▼7	38.60	41.27	74,857	
Merton Park RA	3	3	0	▲3	5.26	3.07	5,567	
Longthornton and Tamworth Residents	3	0	0	Steady	5.26	2.11	3,822	
Liberal Democrats	0	0	0	Steady	0.00	6.47	11,741	
Green	0	0	0	Steady	0.00	2.82	5,106	
West Barnes Independent Residents	0	0	0	Steady	0.00	1.53	2,781	
Independent	0	0	0	Steady	0.00	0.51	932	
Total	57						181,389	

In Durnsford, incumbent Conservative councillor and future Conservative Prime Minister Theresa May topped the poll. This was the last election she contested in Merton.

== Ward results ==
=== Abbey ===
Abbey (3)
Party	Candidate	Votes	%
Labour	Marie-Louise de Villiers*	1,769	46.92
Labour	Geoffrey Martin*	1,665	
Labour	Ian Scott*	1,620	
Conservative	Diana Harris	1,216	32.75
Conservative	Kenneth Butt	1,195	
Conservative	Philip Thorley	1,116	
Liberal Democrats	Pauline Barry	391	9.39
Green	Wendy Flood	320	8.91
Liberal Democrats	Leonard Harvey	315	
Liberal Democrats	Jean Spencer-Phillips	304	
Independent	Grace Giddins	73	2.03
Registered electors		6,914	
Turnout		3,556	51.43
Rejected ballots		5	0.14
Labour hold			
Labour hold			
Labour hold			

=== Cannon Hill ===
Cannon Hill (3)
Party	Candidate	Votes	%
Conservative	Thelma Earnshaw*	1,900	49.03
Conservative	Joan Pethen*	1,880	
Conservative	Colin McCaul	1,834	
Labour	David Chapman	1,448	37.37
Labour	Geoffrey Lightfoot	1,447	
Labour	Brian White	1,382	
Liberal Democrats	Peter Larkin	563	13.60
Liberal Democrats	Patricia Pearce	504	
Liberal Democrats	Stephen van Dulken	490	
Registered electors		6,688	
Turnout		3,990	59.66
Rejected ballots		7	0.18
Conservative hold			
Conservative hold			
Conservative hold			

=== Colliers Wood ===
Colliers Wood (3)
Party	Candidate	Votes	%
Labour	Siobhain McDonagh*	2,079	54.91
Labour	Sheila Knight*	1,834	
Labour	Reginald Flegg	1,694	
Conservative	Maureen Petty	922	24.65
Conservative	Marcus Money-Chappelle	871	
Conservative	Babubhai Patel	725	
Green	Thomas Walsh	696	20.45
Registered electors		7,449	
Turnout		3,410	45.78
Rejected ballots		9	0.26
Labour hold			
Labour hold			
Labour hold			

=== Dundonald ===
Dundonald (3)
Party	Candidate	Votes	%
Labour	Sandra Cowling*	1,649	39.16
Labour	Michael Brunt	1,516	
Conservative	John Elvidge*	1,424	34.96
Labour	Charles Lucas	1,373	
Conservative	Christopher Grayling	1,354	
Conservative	Julian Samways	1,275	
Green	David Bezkorowajny	643	16.64
Liberal Democrats	Richard Ladmore	363	9.24
Liberal Democrats	John Houlihan	355	
Liberal Democrats	Stephen Katz	353	
Registered electors		6,115	
Turnout		3,653	59.74
Rejected ballots		7	0.19
Labour hold			
Labour gain from Conservative			
Conservative hold			

=== Durnsford ===
Durnsford (2)
Party	Candidate	Votes	%
Conservative	Theresa May*	1,063	43.87
Conservative	Barry Edwards	1,049	
Labour	Arthur Kennedy	913	36.64
Labour	Nina Scowen	852	
Liberal Democrats	Susan Knibbs	317	11.72
Liberal Democrats	Philip Rumney	246	
Green	Keith Parke	187	7.77
Registered electors		4,065	
Turnout		2,424	59.63
Rejected ballots		3	0.12
Conservative hold			
Conservative hold			

=== Figge's Marsh ===
Figge's Marsh (3)
Party	Candidate	Votes	%
Labour	David Proctor	1,930	51.28
Labour	Daniel Connellan*	1,892	
Labour	Geraldine Stanford	1,864	
Conservative	David Lincoln	1,470	38.19
Conservative	Lisa Preuveneers	1,424	
Conservative	Gladys Viola	1,338	
Green	Julie Gates	389	10.53
Registered electors		7,191	
Turnout		3,903	54.28
Rejected ballots		6	0.15
Labour hold			
Labour hold			
Labour gain from Conservative			

=== Graveney ===
Graveney (2)
Party	Candidate	Votes	%
Labour	Linda Kirby*	1,399	69.91
Labour	Joseph Abrams*	1,328	
Conservative	David Woodhouse	607	30.09
Conservative	Angela Scantlebury	567	
Registered electors		4,266	
Turnout		2,157	50.56
Rejected ballots		13	0.60
Labour hold			
Labour hold			

=== Hillside ===
Hillside (3)
Party	Candidate	Votes	%
Conservative	Stephen Ashcroft*	1,875	51.44
Conservative	Ralph Kenber	1,799	
Conservative	David Williams	1,788	
Labour	Christine Bickerstaff	771	20.28
Labour	William Bailey	718	
Labour	Laurence North	666	
Green	Richard Miller	533	15.06
Liberal Democrats	George Greene	518	13.22
Liberal Democrats	Maja Katz	455	
Liberal Democrats	Andrew Watson	430	
Registered electors		6,452	
Turnout		3,339	51.75
Rejected ballots		0	0.00
Conservative hold			
Conservative hold			
Conservative hold			

=== Lavender ===
Lavender (2)
Party	Candidate	Votes	%
Labour	Anthony Colman	1,327	71.95
Labour	Nathan Lee	1,324	
Conservative	John Ratcliffe	561	28.05
Conservative	Keith Whipp	472	
Registered electors		3,986	
Turnout		2,015	50.55
Rejected ballots		2	0.10
Labour hold			
Labour hold			

=== Longthornton ===
Longthornton (3)
Party	Candidate	Votes	%
Longthornton and Tamworth Residents	Robert Elgin*	1,315	39.18
Longthornton and Tamworth Residents	Malcolm Searle*	1,260	
Longthornton and Tamworth Residents	Gillian Elgin	1,247	
Labour	Cyril Gallant	1,101	32.72
Labour	Ronald Spurway	1,080	
Labour	Sheila Spurway	1,010	
Conservative	Pauline Blythe	981	28.10
Conservative	Douglas Grahame	881	
Conservative	Renee Donnelly	880	
Registered electors		7,296	
Turnout		3,540	48.52
Rejected ballots		5	0.14
Longthornton and Tamworth Residents hold			
Longthornton and Tamworth Residents hold			
Longthornton and Tamworth Residents hold			

=== Lower Morden ===
Lower Morden (3)
Party	Candidate	Votes	%
Conservative	William Welsh	1,967	51.28
Conservative	Janet Jones*	1,945	
Conservative	Peter Morss	1,864	
Labour	Eric Blackmore	1,447	36.76
Labour	John Holland	1,390	
Labour	William Maguire	1,303	
Green	Robert Burrows	449	11.96
Registered electors		6,712	
Turnout		3,867	57.61
Rejected ballots		11	0.28
Conservative hold			
Conservative hold			
Conservative hold			

=== Merton Park ===
Merton Park (3)
Party	Candidate	Votes	%
Merton Park RA	Bridget Smith*	1,947	51.07
Merton Park RA	Desmonde Child	1,815	
Merton Park RA	Neville Beddoe	1,805	
Conservative	Harold Turner*	1,181	32.06
Conservative	Anne Sparrow	1,174	
Conservative	John Day	1,141	
Labour	Patrick O'Sullivan	625	16.87
Labour	Edmond Ceci	619	
Labour	Nicholas Morgan	594	
Registered electors		6,365	
Turnout		3,777	59.34
Rejected ballots		2	0.05
Merton Park RA gain from Conservative			
Merton Park RA gain from Conservative			
Merton Park RA gain from Conservative			

=== Phipps Bridge ===
Phipps Bridge (3)
Party	Candidate	Votes	%
Labour	Paul Harper*	1,798	50.58
Labour	Keith Harris	1,778	
Labour	Gerard Harkin	1,671	
Conservative	Paul Nash	1,124	30.48
Conservative	Michael Miles	1,071	
Conservative	Barry Theobald-Hicks	966	
Liberal Democrats	Stephan Brocklesby	375	9.72
Liberal Democrats	Jonathan Snelling	352	
Independent	Richard Law	319	9.22
Liberal Democrats	Marek Siemaszko	281	
Registered electors		7,681	
Turnout		3,619	47.12
Rejected ballots		7	0.19
Labour hold			
Labour hold			
Labour hold			

=== Pollards Hill ===
Pollards Hill (3)
Party	Candidate	Votes	%
Labour	Frederick Flatt	1,651	45.77
Labour	Maria Dingwall	1,582	
Conservative	Barbara Mansfield*	1,352	38.04
Labour	Mohammad Syed	1,349	
Conservative	William Hall	1,290	
Conservative	David Justice	1,166	
Independent	John Cole*	540	16.19
Registered electors		6,434	
Turnout		3,438	53.43
Rejected ballots		9	0.26
Labour gain from Conservative			
Labour gain from Conservative			
Conservative hold			

=== Ravensbury ===
Ravensbury (3)
Party	Candidate	Votes	%
Labour	David Cowling	1,982	57.97
Labour	Philip Jones*	1,941	
Labour	Peter McCabe*	1,914	
Conservative	Alfred Atkins	990	28.77
Conservative	Janette Williams	964	
Conservative	Keith Guy	945	
Liberal Democrats	Philip Knight	268	7.60
Liberal Democrats	Susan Simmonds	254	
Liberal Democrats	Anthony Dix	242	
Green	Helen Willis	190	5.66
Registered electors		6,586	
Turnout		3,539	53.74
Rejected ballots		4	0.11
Labour hold			
Labour hold			
Labour hold			

=== Raynes Park ===
Raynes Park (3)
Party	Candidate	Votes	%
Conservative	Richard Aitken-Davies*	2,062	51.09
Conservative	Andrew Chamberlain*	2,010	
Conservative	Kathleen Lewis	1,973	
Labour	David Herbert	1,087	25.71
Labour	David Heaton	980	
Labour	Alison Morgan	975	
Green	Ian Funnell	496	12.58
Liberal Democrats	Richard Tibbetts	429	10.62
Liberal Democrats	David Whiting	422	
Liberal Democrats	Samantha Vanes	407	
Registered electors		6,976	
Turnout		3,784	54.24
Rejected ballots		2	0.05
Conservative hold			
Conservative hold			
Conservative hold			

=== St. Helier ===
St Helier (3)
Party	Candidate	Votes	%
Labour	Alec Leaver*	1,980	56.41
Labour	Geoffrey Smith*	1,879	
Labour	Andrew Vail	1,831	
Conservative	Donald Carr	1,123	32.80
Conservative	Gordon Mackay	1,100	
Conservative	Peter Reid	1,086	
Green	Stephen Boulding	363	10.79
Registered electors		6,525	
Turnout		3,528	54.07
Rejected ballots		6	0.17
Labour hold			
Labour hold			
Labour hold			

=== Trinity ===
Trinity (3)
Party	Candidate	Votes	%
Labour	Kingsley Abrams*	1,254	37.41
Labour	Mazhar-Ul Khan	1,165	
Labour	Christopher Watson	1,157	
Conservative	Ian Mortimer	1,009	30.48
Conservative	Hugh Treseder	954	
Conservative	Brian Terrett	951	
Liberal Democrats	Neil Rennie	658	19.90
Liberal Democrats	Deborah Richardson	649	
Liberal Democrats	Alison Willott	594	
Green	Keith O'Neill	389	12.21
Registered electors		5,732	
Turnout		3,105	54.17
Rejected ballots		1	0.03
Labour hold			
Labour hold			
Labour hold			

=== Village ===
Village (3)
Party	Candidate	Votes	%
Conservative	Dirk Hazell*	1,958	58.48
Conservative	Allan Jones*	1,915	
Conservative	John Watson*	1,888	
Labour	Nicholas Draper	522	15.54
Labour	Denise Leggett	520	
Labour	John Gumbley	489	
Liberal Democrats	Elizabeth Robins	479	12.24
Green	Vaughan Flood	451	13.74
Liberal Democrats	John Field	378	
Liberal Democrats	Marilyn Rumney	349	
Registered electors		5,910	
Turnout		3,130	52.96
Rejected ballots		4	0.07
Conservative hold			
Conservative hold			
Conservative hold			

=== West Barnes ===
West Barnes (3)
Party	Candidate	Votes	%
Conservative	Dorothy Truman*	1,792	45.58
Conservative	Percy Marchant	1,731	
Conservative	Michael Menhinick	1,698	
Labour	Nigel Duncan	1,217	30.13
Labour	Barry Edwards	1,144	
Labour	Laurence Naylor	1,088	
West Barnes Independent Residents	Roger Logan	961	24.29
West Barnes Independent Residents	Brian Parkin	918	
West Barnes Independent Residents	John Nicholson	902	
Registered electors		6,941	
Turnout		3,990	57.49
Rejected ballots		3	0.08
Conservative hold			
Conservative hold			
Conservative hold			

== Notes and references ==
Notes
