= 2002 Merton London Borough Council election =

← 1998	2 May 2002	2006 →

All 60 council seats on Merton London Borough Council
- Turnout: 34.2% (▼3.8%)
	First party	Second party	Third party
Party	Labour	Conservative	Merton Park Residents
Last election	39 seats, 44.2%	12 seats, 32.9%	3 seats, 3.4%
Seats won	32	25	3
Seat change	▼7	▲13	Steady
Popular vote	47,081	48,188	4,334
Percentage	37.1%	38.0%	3.4%
Swing	▼7.1%	▲5.1%	Steady
- Map of the results of the 2002 Merton council election. Conservatives in blue, Labour in red and Merton Park Ward Residents Association in white.
Council leader before election
Andrew Judge
Labour
Council leader after election
Andrew Judge
Labour

Elections for the London Borough of Merton were held on 2 May 2002. This was on the same day as other local elections in England. These elections were held under new ward boundaries, which increased the number of councillors to sixty from fifty-seven. Labour remained in overall control of the council with a reduced majority.

== Results ==
Between the last election and the polling day, an unusual number of seat changes had occurred. At a by-election in West Barnes on 9 November 2000, the Conservatives gained a seat from the Liberal Democrats. Of the 39 Labour councillors elected in 1998, one defected to the Green Party, three defected to independent Labour, one resigned from the party and one seat had become vacant in 2002. This meant that, on the eve of the election, Labour had 33 seats to the Conservatives' 13 and the Liberal Democrats had 2.

The Labour Party maintained its overall majority control in the borough, but its majority was reduced to four seats. The Conservatives made significant gains and indeed polled a higher vote share than Labour, despite winning fewer seats. The Liberal Democrats failed to hold onto the newly-redrawn ward of West Barnes, losing their three seats in the ward to the Conservatives.

The Merton Park Ward Residents' Association maintained its three councillors in Merton Park.

Merton local election result 2002
Party	Seats	Gains	Losses	Net gain/loss	Seats %	Votes %	Votes	+/−
Conservative	25			▲13	41.7%	38.0%	48,188	▲5.1%
Labour	32			▼7	53.3%	37.1%	47,081	▼7.1%
Merton Park Residents	3			0	5.0%	3.4%	4,334	Steady
Liberal Democrats	0			▼3	0%	11.1%	14,063	▼3.4%
Green	0			0	0%	7.3%	9,279	▲2.5%
Wimbledon Park Independent Residents	0			0	0%	1.7%	2,198	n/a
UKIP	0			0	0%	0.7%	851	n/a
Independent	0			0	0%	0.5%	644	n/a
BNP	0			0	0%	0.2%	302	▼0.1%

== Results by Ward ==
=== Abbey ===
Abbey
Party	Candidate	Votes	%	±%
Labour	Su Assinen*	766	39.9	
Labour	Pauline Abrams	765	39.8	
Labour	Mick Fitzgerald	710	37.0	
Conservative	Stephen Ashcroft	644	33.5	
Conservative	Anne Bottell	613	31.9	
Conservative	Gordon Raymond	538	28.0	
Liberal Democrats	Catherine Brown	320	16.6	
Liberal Democrats	John O'Boyle	301	15.7	
Liberal Democrats	Celia Lee	260	13.5	
Green	Jacqueline Barrow	233	12.1	
Green	John Barrow	180	9.3	
Green	Conal Cunningham	166	8.6	
Turnout		1,927	27.4	
Labour win (new seat)				
Labour win (new seat)				
Labour win (new seat)				

=== Cannon Hill ===
Cannon Hill
Party	Candidate	Votes	%	±%
Conservative	Deborah Shears	1,396	47.7	
Conservative	Fiona Bryce	1,341	45.8	
Conservative	David Shellhorn	1,277	43.6	
Labour	Stephen Alambritis	893	30.5	
Labour	Henry MacAuley	803	27.4	
Labour	Charles Lucas*	785	26.8	
Liberal Democrats	Blaise Eglington	351	12.0	
Liberal Democrats	Michael Spalding	333	11.4	
Liberal Democrats	Richard Ladmore	319	10.9	
Independent	Despina Steiert	215	7.3	
UKIP	Graham Mills	175	6.0	
Green	Francis Cluer	153	5.2	
Green	Catherine Fallowfield	119	4.1	
Green	Giles Fallowfield	98	3.3	
Turnout		2,928	42.9	
Conservative win (new seat)				
Conservative win (new seat)				
Conservative win (new seat)				

=== Colliers Wood ===
Colliers Wood
Party	Candidate	Votes	%	±%
Labour	Nicholas Draper	1,328	51.6	
Labour	Sheila Knight*	1,306	50.8	
Labour	George Reynolds*	1,254	48.8	
Green	Thomas Walsh	940	36.5	
Green	Alan Johnson	813	31.6	
Green	Rajeev Thacker	752	29.2	
Conservative	Philip Beard	179	7.0	
Conservative	Joan Boyes	158	6.1	
Conservative	John Lewis	145	5.6	
Turnout		2,572	37.8	
Labour win (new seat)				
Labour win (new seat)				
Labour win (new seat)				

=== Cricket Green ===
Cricket Green
Party	Candidate	Votes	%	±%
Labour	Ian Munn*	1,160	55.1	
Labour	Russell Makin*	1,120	53.2	
Labour	Judith Saunders*	1,012	48.1	
Conservative	Sally Hammond	557	26.5	
Conservative	Rhoda McCorquodale	531	25.2	
Conservative	Gordon Southcott	481	22.9	
Liberal Democrats	Nicholas Pizey	321	15.3	
Green	Louise Deere	216	10.3	
Green	Michael Deere	180	8.6	
Turnout		2,104	30.3	
Labour win (new seat)				
Labour win (new seat)				
Labour win (new seat)				

=== Dundonald ===
Dundonald
Party	Candidate	Votes	%	±%
Conservative	Matthew Bird	792	35.5	
Conservative	Corinna O'Brien-Edge	769	34.5	
Labour	Amanda Ramsay	756	33.9	
Labour	Michael Brunt*	751	33.7	
Labour	Stuart Pickover*	729	32.7	
Conservative	Paul Wigham	716	32.1	
Liberal Democrats	Anne Blanchard	455	20.4	
Green	Christina Langley	330	14.8	
Liberal Democrats	Christopher Oxford	328	14.7	
Liberal Democrats	Stephen Harbron	322	14.4	
Independent	Julia Goldsmith	238	10.7	
Independent	Rathy Alagaratnam	191	8.6	
Turnout		2,231	33.6	
Conservative win (new seat)				
Conservative win (new seat)				
Labour win (new seat)				

=== Figge's Marsh ===
Figge's Marsh
Party	Candidate	Votes	%	±%
Labour	Geraldine Stanford*	1,052	54.4	
Labour	Danny Connellan*	988	51.1	
Labour	Andrew Judge*	939	48.6	
Conservative	David Hart	483	25.0	
Conservative	James Walsh	430	22.2	
Conservative	Robert Marven	425	22.0	
Liberal Democrats	Malcolm Geldart	325	16.8	
Green	Janette Wilkin	199	10.3	
Green	Simon Wilkin	137	7.1	
Turnout		1,933	28.6	
Labour win (new seat)				
Labour win (new seat)				
Labour win (new seat)				

=== Graveney ===
Graveney
Party	Candidate	Votes	%	±%
Labour	Linda Kirby*	1,197	58.9	
Labour	Joe Abrams*	1,193	58.7	
Labour	John Dehaney	1,087	53.5	
Conservative	John Stephenson	436	21.5	
Conservative	Joy Woods	423	20.8	
Conservative	Mohammad Qureshi	406	20.0	
Liberal Democrats	Eamonn Clifford	324	15.9	
Green	Emma-Ruth Crowhurst	200	9.8	
Green	Mark Adri-Soejoko	160	7.9	
Turnout		2,032	29.6	
Labour win (new seat)				
Labour win (new seat)				
Labour win (new seat)				

=== Hillside ===
Hillside
Party	Candidate	Votes	%	±%
Conservative	Richard Harwood*	1,053	53.1	
Conservative	David Williams*	1,031	52.0	
Conservative	David Simpson	982	49.5	
Labour	Linda Thomas	444	22.4	
Labour	Geeta Nargund	420	21.2	
Labour	Stephen Thomas	395	19.9	
Liberal Democrats	Joan Pyke-Lees	387	19.5	
Liberal Democrats	Philippa Willott	366	18.5	
Liberal Democrats	Steve Bradley	363	18.3	
Green	Nicholas Robins	243	12.3	
Turnout		1,983	30.2	
Conservative win (new seat)				
Conservative win (new seat)				
Conservative win (new seat)				

=== Lavender Fields ===
Lavender Fields
Party	Candidate	Votes	%	±%
Labour	Mary Dunn	886	56.4	
Labour	Mark Allison	873	55.6	
Labour	Edith Macauley*	760	48.4	
Conservative	Alfred Acott	378	24.1	
Conservative	June Hayles	367	23.4	
Conservative	Eugene Byrne	358	22.8	
Liberal Democrats	Bernard Conway	227	14.4	
Green	Jennifer Barker	224	14.3	
Green	John Barker	171	10.9	
Turnout		1,571	24.0	
Labour win (new seat)				
Labour win (new seat)				
Labour win (new seat)				

=== Longthornton ===
Longthornton
Party	Candidate	Votes	%	±%
Labour	Stephen Austin	1,180	49.7	
Labour	David Chung	1,107	46.7	
Labour	Leighton Veale	963	40.6	
Conservative	David Robinson	921	38.8	
Conservative	Louisa Hatcher	897	37.8	
Conservative	Ronald Cox	886	37.4	
Liberal Democrats	Pauline Barry	281	11.8	
Green	Jonathan Halls	183	7.7	
Turnout		2,372	35.8	
Labour win (new seat)				
Labour win (new seat)				
Labour win (new seat)				

=== Lower Morden ===
Lower Morden
Party	Candidate	Votes	%	±%
Conservative	Maurice Groves*	1,378	53.8	
Conservative	Terence Sullivan	1,183	46.2	
Conservative	Leslie Mutch	1,180	46.1	
Labour	Elizabeth Daughters	682	26.6	
Labour	Alan Hodgson	621	24.3	
Labour	Muhammod Rahman	537	21.0	
UKIP	Adrian Roberts	385	15.0	
Liberal Democrats	Patricia Pearce	345	13.5	
Green	Giles Barrow	233	9.1	
Green	Anthony Hewitt	123	4.8	
Green	Leslie Johnson	107	4.2	
Turnout		2,560	39.4	
Conservative win (new seat)				
Conservative win (new seat)				
Conservative win (new seat)				

=== Merton Park ===
Merton Park
Party	Candidate	Votes	%	±%
Merton Park Residents	Jillian Ashton	1,499	54.2	
Merton Park Residents	Peter Southgate	1,420	51.4	
Merton Park Residents	John Nelson-Jones*	1,415	51.2	
Conservative	David Edge	765	27.7	
Conservative	Richard Chellew	731	26.4	
Conservative	Richard Mernane	716	25.9	
Labour	Richard Nichols	409	14.8	
Labour	Michael Reddin	373	13.5	
Labour	Robert Powell	355	12.8	
Green	Naomi Adams	201	7.3	
UKIP	Andrew Mills	127	4.6	
Turnout		2,765	41.8	
Merton Park Residents hold		Swing		
Merton Park Residents hold		Swing		
Merton Park Residents hold		Swing		

=== Pollards Hill ===
Pollards Hill
Party	Candidate	Votes	%	±%
Labour	John Cole*	1,167	53.4	
Labour	Michael Tilcock	1,153	52.8	
Labour	Martin Whelton	1,026	47.0	
Conservative	Margaret Neville	690	31.6	
Conservative	Kenneth Butt	631	28.9	
Conservative	Paul Goulden	602	27.6	
Liberal Democrats	Nicholas Wren	257	11.8	
Green	Robin Bannister	205	9.4	
Turnout		2,184	31.7	
Labour win (new seat)				
Labour win (new seat)				
Labour win (new seat)				

=== Ravensbury ===
Ravensbury
Party	Candidate	Votes	%	±%
Labour	Philip Jones*	946	49.8	
Labour	Peter McCabe*	909	47.8	
Labour	Tony Giles	894	47.1	
Conservative	Barbara Mansfield	583	30.7	
Conservative	Jeffrey Gunn	540	28.4	
Conservative	Reginald Martin	527	27.7	
Liberal Democrats	Danielle Toyer	343	18.1	
Green	Paul Barasi*	205	10.8	
Turnout		1,900	29.0	
Labour win (new seat)				
Labour win (new seat)				
Labour win (new seat)				

=== Raynes Park ===
Raynes Park
Party	Candidate	Votes	%	±%
Conservative	Margaret Brierly*	1,294	49.4	
Conservative	Horst Bullinger	1,186	45.2	
Conservative	Michael Cheng	1,131	43.1	
Liberal Democrats	Sally Harlow	809	30.9	
Liberal Democrats	Gail Moss	764	29.1	
Liberal Democrats	Kamaljit Sood	626	23.9	
Labour	Michael Somerville	422	16.1	
Labour	Geoffrey Roberts	419	16.0	
Labour	Stefano Scalzo	395	15.1	
Green	Richard Evans	232	8.8	
Green	Jean Curry	155	5.9	
Green	Brian Parkin	127	4.8	
Turnout		2,622	38.5	
Conservative win (new seat)				
Conservative win (new seat)				
Conservative win (new seat)				

=== St Helier ===
St Helier
Party	Candidate	Votes	%	±%
Labour	Dennis Pearce*	958	44.7	
Labour	Maxi Martin*	947	44.2	
Labour	Mickey Spacey*	840	39.2	
Conservative	Joan Goodacre	532	24.8	
Conservative	Sydney Quick	519	24.2	
Conservative	Ronald Wilson	509	23.8	
Liberal Democrats	Joyce Smith	324	15.1	
BNP	Danny Ford	302	14.1	
Green	Susan Boulding	192	9.0	
Green	Stephen Boulding	178	8.3	
UKIP	Christopher Byrne	164	7.7	
Turnout		2,143	32.5	
Labour win (new seat)				
Labour win (new seat)				
Labour win (new seat)				

=== Trinity ===
Trinity
Party	Candidate	Votes	%	±%
Conservative	Dorothy Kilsby	805	37.7	
Conservative	Christopher McLaughlin	799	37.4	
Labour	Andrew Coles	781	36.5	
Conservative	Maria Miller	780	36.5	
Labour	Vivien Guy*	771	36.1	
Labour	Mohammad Karim*	687	32.1	
Liberal Democrats	Colette Mulchrone	312	14.6	
Liberal Democrats	Bonita Ralph	293	13.7	
Liberal Democrats	Christopher Shoebridge	270	12.6	
Green	Jennifer Barrow	246	11.5	
Green	Lisa Ingram	203	9.5	
Green	Hector Ingram	199	9.3	
Turnout		2,138	33.1	
Conservative win (new seat)				
Conservative win (new seat)				
Labour win (new seat)				

=== Village ===
Village
Party	Candidate	Votes	%	±%
Conservative	Stephen Hammond	1,667	70.0	
Conservative	John Bowcott	1,662	69.8	
Conservative	Samantha George*	1,629	68.4	
Labour	William Bottriell	321	13.5	
Labour	Michelle McNicol	303	12.7	
Labour	David Ives	299	12.6	
Liberal Democrats	Gerald Blanchard	290	12.2	
Liberal Democrats	Alison Edelsten	285	12.0	
Liberal Democrats	Jennifer Tyler	259	10.9	
Green	Rupert Stevens	166	7.0	
Turnout		2,382	37.8	
Conservative win (new seat)				
Conservative win (new seat)				
Conservative win (new seat)				

=== West Barnes ===
West Barnes
Party	Candidate	Votes	%	±%
Conservative	Gillian Lewis-Lavender*	1,198	43.5	
Conservative	William Brierly	1,174	42.6	
Conservative	Angela Caldara	1,106	40.1	
Liberal Democrats	Iain Dysart*	1,054	38.2	
Liberal Democrats	Nicholas Harris*	913	33.1	
Liberal Democrats	Louise Pugh	856	31.0	
Labour	David Filby	466	16.9	
Labour	Margaret Layton	422	15.3	
Labour	Angela Manser	361	13.1	
Green	Michael Bell	157	5.7	
Green	Mark Davidson	135	4.9	
Green	David Patterson	91	3.3	
Turnout		2,757	40.1	
Conservative win (new seat)				
Conservative win (new seat)				
Conservative win (new seat)				

=== Wimbledon Park ===
Wimbledon Park
Party	Candidate	Votes	%	±%
Conservative	Elisabeth Mitchell	1,058	37.8	
Conservative	Oonagh Moulton	1,018	36.3	
Conservative	Tariq Ahmad	982	35.1	
Wimbledon Park Ward Independent Residents	Stephen Saul	782	27.9	
Labour	Elizabeth Nelson	743	26.5	
Wimbledon Park Ward Independent Residents	John White	723	25.8	
Wimbledon Park Ward Independent Residents	Mark Thompson*	693	24.7	
Labour	Syed Rizvi	643	23.0	
Labour	Kenneth Wilshire	598	21.3	
Liberal Democrats	John Houlihan	256	9.1	
Liberal Democrats	Richard Tibbetts	234	8.4	
Green	Ernest Dennis	204	7.3	
Green	Sarah Miskin	131	4.7	
Green	Nicholas Miskin	92	3.3	
Turnout		2,801	40.6	
Conservative win (new seat)				
Conservative win (new seat)				
Conservative win (new seat)				

== By-Elections ==
Ravensbury by-election, 6 March 2003
Party	Candidate	Votes	%	±%
Labour	Stephen Alambritis	1,014	46.4	−0.7
Conservative	Barbara J. Mansfield	942	43.1	+12.4
UKIP	Adrian K. J. Roberts	116	5.3	N/A
Green	Richard M. Evans	112	5.1	−5.7
Majority		72	3.3	−13.1
Turnout		2,184	33.7	+4.7
Labour hold		Swing		

The by-election was called following the resignation of Cllr. Tony Giles.

Lower Morden by-election, 10 June 2004
Party	Candidate	Votes	%	±%
Conservative	Ronald W. Wilson	1,401	49.9	+3.8
Labour	Terence J. Daniels	576	20.5	−6.1
UKIP	Adrian K. J. Roberts	392	14.0	−1.0
Liberal Democrats	Lina Akbar	262	9.3	−4.2
Green	Giles T. Barrow	175	6.2	−2.9
Majority		825	29.4	+9.9
Turnout		2,806	43.9	
Conservative hold		Swing		

The by-election was called following the resignation of Cllr. Leslie D. Mutch.
