= Merton Park Ward Residents Association =

Merton Park Ward Residents Association Merton Park Ward Independent Residents
- Leader: Edward Foley
- Founded: 1989
- Merton London Borough Council: 2 / 57

Website
- www.mertonpark.org.uk

Merton Park Ward Residents Association (MPWRA) is a residents association, active in the Merton Park ward. The MPWRA has two councillors on Merton London Borough Council, and for this purpose is registered as the political party Merton Park Ward Independent Residents.

== History ==
The MPWRA was formed in 1989 in order to contest the October 1989 Merton Park by-election, caused by the resignation of a Conservative councillor. The MPWRA opposed the proposed extension of the A24 relief road across a corner of the Merton Park Conservation Area, which required the demolition of several Victorian houses. At the by-election, Bridget Smith was elected for the MPWRA; this hung the council. In the following year's borough general election, the MPWRA gained all three council seats of the Merton Park ward, becoming the third-largest party on the council. The A24 relief road was not extended.

The MPWRA held every seat in the ward in all subsequent elections, although the number of seats for the ward was reduced to two ahead of the 2022 elections. After the 2010 elections, the MPWRA provided support for a minority Labour administration until Labour regained a majority at the 2014 elections. Following seat gains for the Liberal Democrats on other wards at the 2018 elections, the MPWRA became the fourth-largest party on the council.

Since its founding, the MPWRA has campaigned for the redevelopment of Nelson Hospital and the regeneration of Morden's town centre. The MPWRA publishes a quarterly local publication known as Forum.

== Election results ==
Election	Seats	Votes				Borough-wide result		Councillors		
Election	Seats	#	% in ward	±	% in borough	Position	Administration	1	2	3
1990	3	5,567	51.1%	n/a	3.1%	▲3rd	Labour	Bridget Smith	Dese Child	Neville Beddoe
1994	3	5,860	59.3%	▲8.2%	3.6%	3rd	Labour	Bridget Smith	Dese Child	Neville Beddoe
1998	3	4,415	52.4%	▼6.9%	3.4%	3rd	Labour	Bridget Smith	Dese Child	John Nelson Jones
2002	3	4,334	54.1%	▲1.7%	3.4%	3rd	Labour	Jillian Aston	Peter Southgate	John Nelson Jones
2006	3	4,815	50.0%	▼4.1%	3.0%	3rd	Conservative minority	Karin Forbes	Peter Southgate	Krysia Williams
2010	3	7,572	53.0%	▲3.0%	2.9%	3rd	Labour minority	Karin Forbes	Peter Southgate	John Sargeant
2014	3	6,222	63.7%	▲10.7%	3.7%	3rd	Labour	Edward Foley	Peter Southgate	John Sargeant
2018	3	5,898	56.7%	▼7.0%	3.3%	▼4th	Labour	Edward Foley	Peter Southgate	Dickie Wilkinson
2022	2	5,898	59.9%	▲3.2%	2.1%	4th	Labour	Edward Foley	Stephen Mercer	
2026	2						Labour			
