= Trinity (Merton ward) =

Electoral ward in London, England, 1978–2022

- Former electoral ward for the Merton London Borough Council
- Borough: Merton
- County: Greater London

Former electoral ward
- Created: 1978
- Abolished: 2022
- Councillors: 3

Trinity was an electoral ward in the London Borough of Merton. The ward was abolished for the 2022 elections. Trinity ward elected three councillors to Merton London Borough Council.

== Councillors ==
Election	Councillors		
2018	James Holmes (Conservative)	Paul Kohler (Liberal Democrat)	Hayley Omrod (Conservative)

== Elections ==
=== 2018 ===
Trinity
Party	Candidate	Votes	%	±%
Liberal Democrats	Paul Kohler	1,279	35.8	+23.1
Conservative	James Holmes*	1,199	33.6	−11.1
Conservative	Hayley Ormrod	1,196	33.5	−10.6
Liberal Democrats	Tamara Kohler	1,156	32.4	+22.3
Liberal Democrats	Drake Hackforth-Jones	1,117	31.3	+21.5
Conservative	Abdul Latif*	1,116	31.2	−7.7
Labour	Becky Hooper	1,023	28.6	−4.1
Labour	Ryan Barnett	935	26.2	−2.1
Labour	Billy Hayes	852	23.9	−2.6
Green	Elizabeth Matthews	358	10.0	−8.9
Duma Polska	Marcia Moraczewski	33	0.9	N/A
UKIP	Rod Scott	30	0.8	−8.3
Turnout		3,579	48	
Liberal Democrats gain from Conservative		Swing		
Conservative hold		Swing		
Conservative hold		Swing		

== See also ==
- List of electoral wards in Greater London
