= 2014 Merton London Borough Council election =

2014 local election in England

- 22 May 2014

All 60 council seats on Merton London Borough Council
- Turnout: 41.3% (▼25%)
	First party	Second party
Party	Labour	Conservative
Last election	28 seats, 39.0%	27 seats, 36.3%
Seats won	36	20
Seat change	▲8	▼7
Popular vote	83,091	52,867
Percentage	49.6%	31.6%
Swing	▲10.6%	▼4.8%
	Third party	Fourth party
Party	Merton Park RA	Liberal Democrats
Last election	3 seats, 2.9%	2 seats, 18.1%
Seats won	3	1
Seat change	Steady	▼1
Popular vote	6,222	14,973
Percentage	3.7%	8.9%
Swing	▲0.8%	▼9.2%
- Map of the results of the 2014 Merton council election. Conservatives in blue, Labour in red, Liberal Democrats in yellow and Merton Park Ward Residents Association in white.
Council leader before election
Stephen Alambritis
Labour
Council leader after election
Stephen Alambritis
Labour

Elections for the London Borough of Merton were held on 22 May 2014 to elect members of Merton London Borough Council in England. This was on the same day as other local elections in England and an election to the European Parliament.

The incumbent minority Labour administration gained eight seats from the Conservatives, returning the council to majority control.

== Background ==
In May 2013, four Conservative councillors had defected to the UK Independence Party, including Suzanne Evans, who later became a national spokesperson for the party. No by-elections were called as a result of the defections. In the election, all those who sought re-election as UKIP councillors were defeated, including Evans in the Hillside ward.

== Results summary ==
Labour gained seats from the Conservatives in the wards of Abbey, Cannon Hill and Lower Morden; this returned the council to majority Labour control from no overall control. Labour won 36 seats (+8) and the Conservatives 20 seats (-7). The Liberal Democrats lost one seat in West Barnes to the Conservatives to finish with just 1 seat, whilst the Merton Park Ward Residents Association maintained its three seats in Merton Park.

Merton local election result 2014
Party	Seats	Gains	Losses	Net gain/loss	Seats %	Votes %	Votes	+/−
Labour	36	8	0	▲8	60.0	49.6	83,091	▲10.6
Conservative	20	1	8	▼7	33.3	31.6	52,867	▼4.8
Merton Park RA	3	0	0	Steady	5.0	3.7	6,222	▲0.8
Liberal Democrats	1	0	1	▼1	1.7	8.9	14,973	▼9.2
UKIP	0	0	0	Steady	0.0	3.6	6,112	▲3.2
Green	0	0	0	Steady	0.0	1.5	2,564	▼0.1
Mitcham Independent Party	0	0	0	Steady	0.0	0.6	1,056	N/A
Keep Our St Helier Hospital	0	0	0	Steady	0.0	0.3	422	N/A
TUSC	0	0	0	Steady	0.0	0.1	251	N/A

== Ward results ==
=== Abbey ===
Abbey
Party	Candidate	Votes	%	±%
Labour	Abigail Jones	1,563	47.9	+15.6
Labour	Andrew Judge*	1,560	47.8	+11.5
Labour	Katy Neep	1,519	46.5	+15.4
Conservative	Henry Nelless*	1,136	34.8	−2.0
Conservative	Peter Smith	1,104	33.8	−5.8
Conservative	Cesar Sepulveda	975	29.9	−4.3
Green	David Wood	425	13.0	N/A
Liberal Democrats	Pauline Barry	284	8.7	−17.0
UKIP	Rathy Alagaratnam	259	7.9	N/A
Liberal Democrats	Richard Heinrich	202	6.2	−16.9
Liberal Democrats	John Tippett-Cooper	162	5.0	−17.4
Turnout		3,458	45	
Labour gain from Conservative		Swing		
Labour hold		Swing		
Labour gain from Conservative		Swing		

=== Cannon Hill ===
Cannon Hill
Party	Candidate	Votes	%	±%
Labour	Tobin Byers	1,686	48.2	+21.0
Labour	Pauline Cowper	1,661	47.5	+8.0
Labour	Fidelis Gadzama	1,556	44.5	+7.2
Conservative	Debbie Shears*	1,227	35.1	−8.9
Conservative	Omar Bush	1,153	33.0	−6.5
Conservative	Logie Lohendran*	1,081	30.9	−6.4
UKIP	Andrew Mills	597	14.2	N/A
Liberal Democrats	Andrew Cope	254	7.3	−16.7
Liberal Democrats	Vivian MacVeigh	227	6.5	−14.6
Liberal Democrats	Cosette Malik	131	3.7	−16.5
Turnout			49.3	
Labour gain from Conservative		Swing		
Labour gain from Conservative		Swing		
Labour gain from Conservative		Swing		

=== Colliers Wood ===
Colliers Wood
Party	Candidate	Votes	%	±%
Labour	Nick Draper*	1,774	59.5	+3.7
Labour	Caroline Cooper-Marbiah*	1,687	56.6	+8.3
Labour	Laxmi Attawar*	1,631	54.7	+4.1
Conservative	Peter Lord	674	22.6	+1.2
Conservative	Adam Crymble	646	21.7	+1.2
Conservative	Giuseppe Fraschini	612	20.5	+2.4
Green	Ian Weir	545	18.3	+5.0
Liberal Democrats	Nathan Hollow	238	8.0	−11.0
Liberal Democrats	David Woodbridge	235	7.9	−9.3
TUSC	April Ashley	132	4.4	N/A
Turnout			37.5	
Labour hold		Swing		
Labour hold		Swing		
Labour hold		Swing		

=== Cricket Green ===
Cricket Green
Party	Candidate	Votes	%	±%
Labour	Ian Munn*	2,204	69.3	+7.6
Labour	Russell Makin*	2,170	68.2	+10.3
Labour	Judy Saunders*	2,107	66.3	+9.1
Conservative	Barbara Mansfield	467	14.7	−10.7
Conservative	Andrew Hollingsworth	449	14.1	−6.3
Mitcham Independent Party	Alan Hutchings	386	12.1	N/A
Conservative	Carl Warner	375	11.8	−7.9
Mitcham Independent Party	John Mansfield	360	11.3	N/A
Mitcham Independent Party	Stuart Morrison	310	9.7	N/A
Liberal Democrats	Nicholas Pizey	147	4.6	−11.4
Turnout			40.1	
Labour hold		Swing		
Labour hold		Swing		
Labour hold		Swing		

=== Dundonald ===
Dundonald
Party	Candidate	Votes	%	±%
Conservative	David Dean*	1,408	45.6	+1.9
Conservative	Michael Bull	1,355	43.9	+2.3
Conservative	Suzanne Grocott*	1,326	43.0	+4.3
Liberal Democrats	Giles Bailey	795	25.8	−10.1
Liberal Democrats	Anthony Fairclough	782	25.3	−7.8
Liberal Democrats	Diana Coman	781	25.3	−6.7
Labour	Christine Bickerstaff	758	24.6	+5.0
Labour	Adeniyi Adegboyega	665	21.5	+5.7
Labour	Wayne Busbridge	647	21.0	+7.5
UKIP	Eddie Edwards	232	7.5	N/A
Turnout			44.7	
Conservative hold		Swing		
Conservative hold		Swing		
Conservative hold		Swing		

=== Figge’s Marsh ===
Figge's Marsh
Party	Candidate	Votes	%	±%
Labour	Agatha Akyigyina*	2,483	81.0	+11.7
Labour	Geraldine Stanford*	2,384	77.8	+9.0
Labour	Peter Walker*	2,200	71.8	+8.8
Conservative	William Brierly	439	14.3	−3.5
Conservative	Henry Moulton	390	12.7	−4.6
Conservative	John Telford	366	11.9	−3.8
Liberal Democrats	Peter Cargin	180	5.9	−9.6
Turnout			37.8	
Labour hold		Swing		
Labour hold		Swing		
Labour hold		Swing		

=== Graveney ===
Graveney
Party	Candidate	Votes	%	±%
Labour	John Dehaney*	2,194	78.4	+10.7
Labour	Linda Kirby*	2,132	76.2	+6.8
Labour	Greg Udeh*	1,888	67.5	+8.9
Conservative	Margaret Brierly	421	15.0	−2.4
Conservative	Alice Hammond	376	13.4	−3.7
Conservative	Sally Hammond	333	11.9	−8.3
Liberal Democrats	Peter Hardy	206	7.4	N/A
Liberal Democrats	Benedict Fletcher	205	7.3	−11.8
TUSC	Rodney Kay-Kreizman	119	4.3	N/A
Turnout			38.8	
Labour hold		Swing		
Labour hold		Swing		
Labour hold		Swing		

=== Hillside ===
Hillside
Party	Candidate	Votes	%	±%
Conservative	David Simpson*	1,309	51.8	+5.5
Conservative	David Williams*	1,281	50.7	+3.6
Conservative	Daniel Holden	1,269	50.2	−1.9
Labour	Michelle Gordon	634	25.1	+7.3
Labour	Tony Kane	603	23.9	+9.3
Labour	Christopher McKeon	533	21.1	+7.2
Liberal Democrats	Carmel Fowler	453	17.9	−11.2
UKIP	Suzanne Evans*	342	13.5	−38.6
Liberal Democrats	Hamish Norbrook	337	13.3	−12.2
Liberal Democrats	Mohammed Hasan	336	13.3	−9.8
Turnout			38.2	
Conservative hold		Swing		
Conservative hold		Swing		
Conservative hold		Swing		

- Evans was elected in 2010 as a Conservative councillor

=== Lavender Fields ===
Lavender Fields
Party	Candidate	Votes	%	±%
Labour Co-op	Mark Allison*	1,682	67.9	+12.6
Labour Co-op	Ross Garrod	1,633	65.9	+12.3
Labour Co-op	Edith Macauley*	1,570	63.4	+8.9
UKIP	Don Anderson	424	17.1	N/A
Conservative	Richard Aitken-Davies	344	13.9	−7.4
Conservative	Philip Beard	288	11.6	−7.8
Conservative	Thomas Moulton	263	10.6	−8.2
Liberal Democrats	Liz Barker	232	9.4	−9.4
Turnout			33.2	
Labour hold		Swing		
Labour hold		Swing		
Labour hold		Swing		

=== Longthornton ===
Longthornton
Party	Candidate	Votes	%	±%
Labour	Brenda Fraser*	2,119	72.4	+8.5
Labour	David Chung*	2,115	72.3	+10.1
Labour	Marsie Skeete	1,891	64.6	+12.0
Conservative	Richard Hayward	637	21.8	−5.9
Conservative	Beth Mitchell	583	19.9	−3.2
Conservative	Hamna Qureshi	531	18.2	4.4
Liberal Democrats	Eliane Patton	199	6.8	−11.5
Turnout			38.0	
Labour hold		Swing		
Labour hold		Swing		
Labour hold		Swing		

=== Lower Morden ===
Lower Morden
Party	Candidate	Votes	%	±%
Labour	Sally Kenny	1,762	50.9	+17.8
Labour	Stan Anderson	1,730	49.9	+19.5
Labour	Mary Curtin	1,630	47.0	+21.6
Conservative	Maurice Groves*	1,165	33.6	−16.8
Conservative	Ray Tindle*	1,026	29.6	−9.5
Conservative	Gary Watkinson	928	26.8	−17.3
UKIP	Richard Hilton*	753	21.7	−22.4
Liberal Democrats	Asif Ashraf	172	5.0	−11.7
Turnout			49.9	
Labour gain from Conservative		Swing		
Labour gain from Conservative		Swing		
Labour gain from Conservative		Swing		

=== Merton Park ===
Merton Park
Party	Candidate	Votes	%	±%
Merton Park RA	John Sargeant*	2,123	63.7	+13.5
Merton Park RA	Peter Southgate*	2,052	61.6	+11.5
Merton Park RA	Edward Foley	2,047	61.4	+10.9
Conservative	David Cotterill	566	17.0	−10.1
Labour	Anthony Draper	552	16.6	−0.6
Conservative	Robert Lawrence	520	15.6	−7.7
Conservative	Nicholas Bustin	516	15.5	−6.5
Labour	Ross Savill	496	14.9	+2.2
Labour	Charles Ocansey	495	14.9	+1.5
Liberal Democrats	Duncan Burch	143	4.3	−9.4
Liberal Democrats	John Dalton	143	4.3	N/A
Liberal Democrats	Nazir Malik	115	3.5	N/A
Turnout			47.4	
Merton Park RA hold		Swing		
Merton Park RA hold		Swing		
Merton Park RA hold		Swing		

=== Pollards Hill ===
Pollards Hill
Party	Candidate	Votes	%	±%
Labour	Joan Henry	2,195	72.5	+26.3
Labour	Jeff Hanna*	2,148	70.9	+24.5
Labour	Martin Whelton*	2,135	70.5	+23.1
UKIP	Bob Grahame	498	16.4	N/A
Conservative	Robert Giles	399	13.2	−12.1
Conservative	Jay Crush	382	12.6	−7.1
Conservative	Imran Kali	290	9.6	−9.4
Liberal Democrats	Stephen Harbron	163	5.4	−5.3
Turnout			38.0	
Labour hold		Swing		
Labour hold		Swing		
Labour hold		Swing		

=== Ravensbury ===
Ravensbury
Party	Candidate	Votes	%	±%
Labour	Stephen Alambritis*	1,971	66.0	+13.8
Labour	Philip Jones*	1,769	59.3	+6.6
Labour	Peter McCabe*	1,633	54.7	+5.7
UKIP	John Brereton	649	21.7	N/A
Conservative	Nicholas McLean	420	14.1	−16.0
Conservative	Anton Gjeta	335	11.2	−16.3
Green	Natalie Gordon	328	11.0	N/A
Conservative	Frank Pocock	325	10.9	−11.9
Liberal Democrats	Anne Blanchard	206	6.9	−9.0
Turnout			40.7	
Labour hold		Swing		
Labour hold		Swing		
Labour hold		Swing		

=== Raynes Park ===
Raynes Park
Party	Candidate	Votes	%	±%
Conservative	Jill West	1,351	46.6	−2.8
Conservative	Adam Bush	1,470	46.4	+1.9
Conservative	Stephen Crowe	1,486	46.3	+3.8
Labour	Alison Honor	809	26.6	+8.4
Labour	Charles Lucas	716	23.5	+6.2
Labour	Praful Nargund	672	22.1	+6.5
Liberal Democrats	David Amer	547	18.0	−14.1
Liberal Democrats	Jennifer Bernard	471	15.5	−12.8
Liberal Democrats	Kevin Whincup	444	14.6	−9.8
UKIP	Peter Burton	339	11.1	N/A
Keep Our St Helier Hospital	David Ash	223	7.3	N/A
Turnout			41.8	
Conservative hold		Swing		
Conservative hold		Swing		
Conservative hold		Swing		

=== St Helier ===
St Helier
Party	Candidate	Votes	%	±%
Labour	Maxi Martin*	2,010	67.0	+13.6
Labour	Dennis Pearce*	1,916	63.9	+15.0
Labour	Imran Uddin	1,673	55.8	+6.4
UKIP	Andre Lampitt	663	22.1	N/A
Conservative	Chris Challouma	505	16.8	−14.0
Conservative	Chris McLaughlin	435	14.5	−12.1
Conservative	Hugh Lenon	421	14.0	−12.0
Liberal Democrats	Simon Parritt	203	6.8	−10.3
Turnout			38.7	
Labour hold		Swing		
Labour hold		Swing		
Labour hold		Swing		

=== Trinity ===
Trinity
Party	Candidate	Votes	%	±%
Conservative	James Holmes*	1,283	44.7	+1.5
Conservative	Charlie Chirico	1,270	44.1	+2.1
Conservative	Abdul Latif	1,119	38.9	−0.1
Labour	Mike Blakeney	940	32.7	+6.9
Labour	John Colbert	814	28.3	+5.4
Labour	Haile Warner	763	26.5	+4.4
Green	Liz Matthews	543	18.9	+5.3
Liberal Democrats	Helen Carter	364	12.7	−11.5
Liberal Democrats	Federico Bertero	290	10.1	−12.6
Liberal Democrats	Matthew Payne	283	9.8	−17.5
UKIP	Dominic Moass	263	9.1	N/A
Turnout			39.5	
Conservative hold		Swing		
Conservative hold		Swing		
Conservative hold		Swing		

=== Village ===
Village
Party	Candidate	Votes	%	±%
Conservative	Hamish Badenoch	2,067	72.8	+3.5
Conservative	John Bowcott*	2,055	72.4	+3.4
Conservative	Najeeb Latif	1,848	65.1	−2.1
Labour	Bill Bottriell	385	13.6	+1.9
Labour	Brian Paul	300	10.6	+1.9
UKIP	Rod Scott	298	10.5	N/A
Green	Mason Redding	268	9.4	N/A
Labour	Habibullah Khan	253	8.9	−0.7
Liberal Democrats	Simon McGrath	217	7.8	−9.0
Liberal Democrats	Diana Oxford	213	7.5	−13.2
Liberal Democrats	Daniel Sheridan	164	5.8	−9.3
Turnout			45.2	
Conservative hold		Swing		
Conservative hold		Swing		
Conservative hold		Swing		

=== West Barnes ===
West Barnes
Party	Candidate	Votes	%	±%
Conservative	Gilli Lewis-Lavender*	1,424	40.9	+3.2
Liberal Democrats	Mary-Jane Jeanes*	1,311	37.7	−1.3
Conservative	Brian Lewis-Lavender	1,252	36.0	−0.7
Liberal Democrats	Iain Dysart*	1,218	35.0	−3.0
Conservative	Miles Windsor	966	27.8	−6.4
Liberal Democrats	Philip Ling	902	25.9	−7.3
Labour	Irina Chung	581	16.7	−1.1
Labour	Jerome Neil	577	16.6	+0.5
Labour	Sam Thomas	520	14.9	+1.2
Green	Charles Barraball	455	13.1	+6.0
UKIP	Nicolas O’Gorman	429	12.3	N/A
Turnout			47.0	
Conservative hold		Swing		
Liberal Democrats hold		Swing		
Conservative gain from Liberal Democrats		Swing		

=== Wimbledon Park ===
Wimbledon Park
Party	Candidate	Votes	%	±%
Conservative	Janice Howard*	1,497	46.6	+3.8
Conservative	Oonagh Moulton*	1,424	44.3	+3.3
Conservative	Linda Taylor*	1,367	42.6	−0.5
Labour	Hugh Constant	904	28.1	+7.5
Labour	Ailsa Williams	747	23.3	+5.4
Labour	Motiur Rahman	746	23.2	+7.0
Green	Liam Collins	524	16.3	+8.1
Liberal Democrats	Edward Doran	368	11.5	−14.2
UKIP	Mark McAleer	366	11.4	+7.6
Liberal Democrats	Dave Busby	351	10.9	−18.0
Liberal Democrats	Denis Kouadio	299	9.3	−17.6
Keep Our St Helier Hospital	Sandra Ash	189	5.9	N/A
Turnout			39.8	
Conservative hold		Swing		
Conservative hold		Swing		
Conservative hold		Swing		

== By-elections ==
St Helier by-election, 19 May 2016
Party	Candidate	Votes	%	±%
Labour	Jerome Neil	1,436	71.0	+4.0
Conservative	Susan Edwards	282	13.9	−2.9
UKIP	Richard Hilton	191	9.4	−12.7
Liberal Democrats	Asif Ashraf	59	2.9	−3.9
Green	John Barraball	55	2.7	N/A
Majority		1,154	57.1	
Turnout		2,030	24.9	−13.8
Labour hold		Swing		

The by-election was triggered by the death of Cllr Maxi Martin of the Labour Party.

St Helier by-election, 20 July 2017
Party	Candidate	Votes	%	±%
Labour	Kelly Braund	1,508	74.1	+18.3
Conservative	Geraldine Kirby	318	15.6	−1.2
Liberal Democrats	Geoff Cooper	98	4.8	−2.0
Green	Phillipa Maslin	61	3.0	N/A
UKIP	Bob Grahame	50	2.5	−19.6
Majority		1,190	58.4	
Turnout		2,035	24.9	−13.8
Labour hold		Swing		

The by-election was triggered by the resignation of Cllr Imran Uddin of the Labour Party.
