= 2010 Merton London Borough Council election =

2010 local election in England

- 6 May 2010

All 60 council seats on Merton London Borough Council
- Turnout: 66.3% (▲23.4%)
	First party	Second party
Party	Labour	Conservative
Last election	27 seats, 34.8%	30 seats, 44.6%
Seats won	28	27
Seat change	▲1	▼3
Popular vote	101,959	94,893
Percentage	39.0%	36.3%
Swing	▲4.2%	▼8.3%
	Third party	Fourth party
Party	Merton Park RA	Liberal Democrats
Last election	3 seats, 3.0%	0 seats, 12.0%
Seats won	3	2
Seat change	Steady	▲2
Popular vote	7,572	47,291
Percentage	2.9%	18.1%
Swing	▼0.1%	▲6.1%
- Map of the results of the 2010 Merton council election. Conservatives in blue, Labour in red, Liberal Democrats in yellow and Merton Park Ward Residents Association in white.
Council leader before election
David Williams
Conservative
Council leader after election
Stephen Alambritis
Labour

Elections for the London Borough of Merton were held on 6 May 2010. This was on the same day as other local elections in England and a national general election.

Following the elections, a Labour minority administration was formed with the support of the three Merton Park Ward Residents Association councillors, this replaced the previous Conservative administration.

== Results ==
Labour became the largest party in Merton, defeating the incumbent minority Conservative administration. However, Labour fell three seats short of a majority, so the council remained under no overall control.

The Liberal Democrats regained two seats in West Barnes from the Conservatives and the Merton Park Ward Residents' Association maintained its three councillors in Merton Park.

Merton local election result 2010
Party	Seats	Gains	Losses	Net gain/loss	Seats %	Votes %	Votes	+/−
Labour	28	1	0	▲1	46.7%	39.0%	101,959	▲4.2%
Conservative	27	0	3	▼3	45.0%	36.3%	94,893	▼8.3%
Merton Park RA	3	0	0	0	5.0%	2.9%	7,572	▼0.1%
Liberal Democrats	2	2	0	▲2	3.3%	18.1%	47,291	▲6.1%
Green	0	0	0	0	0%	1.7%	4,331	▼2.2%
BNP	0	0	0	0	0%	0.9%	2,439	▲0.3%
Independent	0	0	0	0	0%	0.6%	1,445	n/a
UKIP	0	0	0	0	0%	0.5%	1,206	▲0.2%
CPA	0	0	0	0	0%	0.1%	149	n/a

=== UKIP defections ===
On 15 May 2013, four Conservative councillors defected to the UK Independence Party (UKIP). This included Suzanne Evans, who later became a national UKIP spokeswoman. No by-elections were called as a result of the defections.

== Results by Ward ==
=== Abbey ===
Abbey
Party	Candidate	Votes	%	±%
Conservative	Diane Neil Mills*	1,888	39.6	−1.6
Conservative	Henry Nelless*	1,758	36.8	−1.7
Labour	Andrew Judge	1,733	36.3	−0.1
Conservative	Abdul Latif	1,634	34.2	−6.5
Labour	Pauline Cowper	1,542	32.3	−2.2
Labour	Emma Nye	1,484	31.1	−3.0
Liberal Democrats	Adam Towner	1,229	25.7	+7.7
Liberal Democrats	Mohammad Karim	1,103	23.1	+8.3
Liberal Democrats	Lesley Warne	1,068	22.4	+9.3
Turnout		4,773	66.3	
Conservative hold		Swing		
Conservative hold		Swing		
Labour gain from Conservative		Swing		

=== Cannon Hill ===
Cannon Hill
Party	Candidate	Votes	%	±%
Conservative	Deborah Shears*	2,195	44.0	−9.7
Conservative	Miles Windsor	1,967	39.5	−15.1
Conservative	Logie Lohendran	1,860	37.3	−14.4
Labour	Leslie Boodram	1,355	27.2	+2.2
Liberal Democrats	Helen Carter	1,195	24.0	+10.2
Labour	Shelley McNicol	1,169	23.5	−1.5
Labour	Aejaz Khanzada	1,094	22.0	+1.2
Liberal Democrats	Hazel Rutledge	1,050	21.1	+8.1
Liberal Democrats	Barrie Lambert	1,007	20.2	+8.1
Independent	Ray Skinner	498	10.0	N/A
BNP	Paul Laws	378	7.6	N/A
CPA	Samuel Jayakrishna	149	3.0	N/A
Turnout		4,983	71.2	
Conservative hold		Swing		
Conservative hold		Swing		
Conservative hold		Swing		

=== Colliers Wood ===
Colliers Wood
Party	Candidate	Votes	%	±%
Labour	Nick Draper*	2,608	55.8	+5.8
Labour	Laxmi Attawar	2,367	50.6	+3.1
Labour	Gam Gurung	2,261	48.3	+2.2
Conservative	Amelia East	1,001	21.4	+9.8
Conservative	Daisy Meyland-Smith	960	20.5	+9.6
Liberal Democrats	Elizabeth Barker	888	19.0	+11.3
Conservative	Cesar Sepulveda	848	18.1	+7.8
Liberal Democrats	Christopher Archer	804	17.2	N/A
Green	Michael Dees	622	13.3	−22.4
Liberal Democrats	Rosemary Wynes-Devlin	608	13.0	N/A
Turnout		4,677	61.5	
Labour hold		Swing		
Labour hold		Swing		
Labour hold		Swing		

=== Cricket Green ===
Cricket Green
Party	Candidate	Votes	%	±%
Labour	Ian Munn*	2,928	61.7	+7.4
Labour	Russell Makin*	2,748	57.9	+6.1
Labour	Judy Saunders*	2,714	57.2	+6.0
Conservative	Barbara Mansfield	1,207	25.4	−7.5
Conservative	Denise March	966	20.4	−8.5
Conservative	William Brierly	937	19.7	−7.0
Liberal Democrats	Nicholas Pizey	757	16.0	−0.9
BNP	Brian Wilkes	398	8.4	N/A
Turnout		4,746	62.6	
Labour hold		Swing		
Labour hold		Swing		
Labour hold		Swing		

=== Dundonald ===
Dundonald
Party	Candidate	Votes	%	±%
Conservative	David Dean	2,130	43.7	+1.0
Conservative	Chris Edge*	2,028	41.6	+0.7
Conservative	Suzanne Grocott	1,888	38.7	−3.0
Liberal Democrats	Martin Crosby	1,748	35.9	+12.1
Liberal Democrats	Anthony Fairclough	1,611	33.1	+12.3
Liberal Democrats	Alain Desmier	1,562	32.0	+15.1
Labour	Christine Bickerstaff	953	19.6	−1.8
Labour	Paul Parkinson	770	15.8	−5.6
Labour	Bishara Torossian	657	13.5	−7.1
Green	Ian Christie	582	11.9	−7.4
Turnout		4,874	70.5	
Conservative hold		Swing		
Conservative hold		Swing		
Conservative hold		Swing		

=== Figge’s Marsh ===
Figge's Marsh
Party	Candidate	Votes	%	±%
Labour	Agatha Akyigyina*	3,271	69.3	+13.4
Labour	Geraldine Stanford*	3,245	68.8	+15.6
Labour	Peter Walker	2,972	63.0	+5.7
Conservative	Gregory Capper	838	17.8	−6.0
Conservative	Hugh Lenon	817	17.3	−5.5
Conservative	John Telford	741	15.7	−7.8
Liberal Democrats	Usaama Kaweesa	733	15.5	+0.9
UKIP	Henry Pringle	335	7.1	−1.5
Turnout		4,718	62.1	
Labour hold		Swing		
Labour hold		Swing		
Labour hold		Swing		

=== Graveney ===
Graveney
Party	Candidate	Votes	%	±%
Labour	Linda Kirby*	3,008	69.4	+11.1
Labour	John Dehaney*	2,937	67.7	+9.6
Labour	Greg Udeh*	2,539	58.6	+10.8
Conservative	Sally Hammond	878	20.2	−6.0
Liberal Democrats	Benedict Fletcher	829	19.1	−1.6
Conservative	Beth Mitchell	755	17.4	−7.6
Conservative	Eleanor Mill	741	17.1	−5.8
Turnout		4,336	61.7	
Labour hold		Swing		
Labour hold		Swing		
Labour hold		Swing		

=== Hillside ===
Hillside
Party	Candidate	Votes	%	±%
Conservative	Suzanne Evans	2,258	52.1	−6.8
Conservative	David Williams*	2,041	47.1	−9.8
Conservative	David Simpson*	2,006	46.3	−10.4
Liberal Democrats	Elizabeth Bowers	1,263	29.1	+10.6
Liberal Democrats	John Houlihan	1,105	25.5	+8.6
Liberal Democrats	Richard Tibbetts	1,000	23.1	+7.3
Labour	Peter McGinity	771	17.8	+3.2
Labour	Ailsa Williams	634	14.6	−2.1
Labour	Ross Savill	601	13.9	+0.7
Green	Nick Robins	427	9.9	−4.9
UKIP	Jimmy Stewart	139	3.2	−0.5
Turnout		4,334	65.9	
Conservative hold		Swing		
Conservative hold		Swing		
Conservative hold		Swing		

=== Lavender Fields ===
Lavender Fields
Party	Candidate	Votes	%	±%
Labour Co-op	Mark Allison*	2,226	55.3	+1.0
Labour Co-op	Edith Macauley*	2,192	54.5	+4.1
Labour Co-op	Mark Betteridge*	2,158	53.6	−1.3
Conservative	Richard Aitken-Davies	857	21.3	−3.7
Conservative	Gordon Southcott	779	19.4	−2.2
Liberal Democrats	Peter Hardy	758	18.8	+0.7
Conservative	Ron Wilson	756	18.8	−2.7
Liberal Democrats	Nadeem Mirza	621	15.4	N/A
Liberal Democrats	Eliane Patton	583	14.5	N/A
Green	John Barker	341	8.5	−12.4
Turnout		4,025	57.5	
Labour hold		Swing		
Labour hold		Swing		
Labour hold		Swing		

=== Longthornton ===
Longthornton
Party	Candidate	Votes	%	±%
Labour	Brenda Fraser	2,906	63.9	+10.4
Labour	David Chung*	2,828	62.2	+9.8
Labour	Sam Thomas	2,391	52.6	+6.5
Conservative	Richard Hayward	1,261	27.7	−9.4
Conservative	Jeya Nadanakumaran	1,052	23.1	−12.9
Conservative	Kaunain Nurani	1,028	22.6	−12.7
Liberal Democrats	Sally Harlow	832	18.3	+6.2
UKIP	Andrew Mills	301	6.6	N/A
Turnout		4,548	64.8	
Labour hold		Swing		
Labour hold		Swing		
Labour hold		Swing		

=== Lower Morden ===
Lower Morden
Party	Candidate	Votes	%	±%
Conservative	Maurice Groves*	2,413	50.4	−12.6
Conservative	Richard Hilton	2,110	44.1	−18.0
Conservative	Ray Tindle	1,869	39.1	−18.9
Labour	Terry Daniels	1,582	33.1	+8.3
Labour	Mark Inger	1,454	30.4	+6.6
Labour	Muzaffar Mansoor	1,217	25.4	+4.9
Liberal Democrats	Patricia Pearce	907	19.0	+5.0
Liberal Democrats	Asif Ashraf	798	16.7	N/A
BNP	Patricia Donelson	456	9.5	N/A
Turnout		4,783	70.8	
Conservative hold		Swing		
Conservative hold		Swing		
Conservative hold		Swing		

=== Merton Park ===
Merton Park
Party	Candidate	Votes	%	±%
Merton Park RA	Karin Forbes*	2,538	50.5	+1.6
Merton Park RA	John Sargeant	2,519	50.2	+2.9
Merton Park RA	Peter Southgate*	2,515	50.1	+1.4
Conservative	Pete Digger	1,359	27.1	−7.8
Conservative	Eleanor Sturge	1,170	23.3	−11.0
Conservative	Linda Taylor	1,106	22.0	−11.8
Labour	Christopher McKeon	862	17.2	+6.1
Liberal Democrats	Duncan Burch	690	13.7	+5.3
Labour	Charles Ocansey	671	13.4	+3.8
Labour	Teresa Ocansey	636	12.7	+3.7
UKIP	Graham Mills	227	4.5	+0.4
Turnout		5,021	72.2	
Merton Park RA hold		Swing		
Merton Park RA hold		Swing		
Merton Park RA hold		Swing		

=== Pollards Hill ===
Pollards Hill
Party	Candidate	Votes	%	±%
Labour	Martin Whelton*	2,820	47.4	−2.0
Labour	Jeffrey Hanna	2,718	46.4	−1.9
Labour	Richard Williams*	2,574	46.2	+1.5
Conservative	Ralph Smith	1,170	25.3	−14.8
Conservative	Andrew Vaughan-Payne	912	19.7	−15.5
Conservative	Aaron Wood	877	19.0	−14.5
Liberal Democrats	Sharon Ajakaiye	496	10.7	−2.1
Liberal Democrats	Hamish Norbrook	476	10.3	N/A
Independent	John Cole	297	6.4	N/A
Independent	Mike Tilcock	269	5.8	N/A
Turnout		4,626	64.8	
Labour hold		Swing		
Labour hold		Swing		
Labour hold		Swing		

=== Ravensbury ===
Ravensbury
Party	Candidate	Votes	%	±%
Labour	Philip Jones*	2,389	52.7	+9.9
Labour	Stephen Alambritis*	2,367	52.2	+8.2
Labour	Peter McCabe*	2,221	49.0	+8.6
Conservative	Margaret Groves	1,364	30.1	−3.8
Conservative	Adam Bush	1,247	27.5	−9.6
Conservative	Deryck Ross	1,035	22.8	−7.6
Liberal Democrats	Joan Pyke-Lees	719	15.9	+1.6
BNP	Robert Holmes	423	9.3	−7.2
Turnout		4,536	64.2	
Labour hold		Swing		
Labour hold		Swing		
Labour hold		Swing		

=== Raynes Park ===
Raynes Park
Party	Candidate	Votes	%	±%
Conservative	Margaret Brierly*	2,466	49.4	−10.4
Conservative	Linda Scott*	2,217	44.5	−13.1
Conservative	Rod Scott*	2,117	42.5	−13.6
Liberal Democrats	David Amer	1,601	32.1	+12.3
Liberal Democrats	Francesca Woodhouse	1,415	28.3	+12.5
Liberal Democrats	Kieron Faller-Mead	1,219	24.4	+9.7
Labour	Margaret Tulloch	909	18.2	+1.0
Labour	Charles Lucas	863	17.3	+0.6
Labour	Geeta Nargrund	778	15.6	+1.2
Green	Richard Evans	572	11.5	−2.8
Turnout		4,987	69.4	
Conservative hold		Swing		
Conservative hold		Swing		
Conservative hold		Swing		

=== St Helier ===
St Helier
Party	Candidate	Votes	%	±%
Labour	Maxi Martin*	2,385	53.4	+10.2
Labour	Stan Anderson	2,206	49.4	+11.1
Labour	Dennis Pearce*	2,185	48.9	+9.0
Conservative	Stephen Crowe	1,373	30.8	−0.4
Conservative	Thomas Lazur	1,189	26.6	−3.2
Conservative	Gary Watkinson	1,161	26.0	+1.1
Liberal Democrats	Maximilian Camplin	762	17.1	+3.3
BNP	Edward Atkins	426	9.5	−9.7
BNP	Brian Wilkes	358	8.0	N/A
Turnout		4,464	63.9	
Labour hold		Swing		
Labour hold		Swing		
Labour hold		Swing		

=== Trinity ===
Trinity
Party	Candidate	Votes	%	±%
Conservative	James Holmes	2,036	43.2	−8.5
Conservative	Krystal Miller*	1,980	42.0	−9.3
Conservative	Simon Withey*	1,836	39.0	−9.5
Liberal Democrats	Matthew Payne	1,287	27.3	+9.6
Labour	Katherine Cowling	1,215	25.8	−6.7
Liberal Democrats	Ewa Mieczkowska	1,138	24.2	+6.5
Labour	Clare Antenen	1,077	22.9	−5.5
Liberal Democrats	Nicolas Webb	1,068	22.7	+7.0
Labour	Alison Fletcher Rogers	1,042	22.1	−4.8
Green	Liz Matthews	641	13.6	N/A
Turnout		4,712	65.5	
Conservative hold		Swing		
Conservative hold		Swing		
Conservative hold		Swing		

=== Village ===
Village
Party	Candidate	Votes	%	±%
Conservative	Samantha George*	3,213	69.3	−11.1
Conservative	John Bowcott*	3,200	69.0	−11.0
Conservative	Richard Chellew*	3,115	67.2	−11.0
Liberal Democrats	Anne Blanchard	960	20.7	+8.9
Liberal Democrats	Simon McGrath	781	16.8	+7.4
Liberal Democrats	David Willis	702	15.1	+6.3
Labour	William Bottriell	543	11.7	+2.4
Labour	Michael Norman-Smith	447	9.6	+2.4
Labour	Brian Paul	403	8.7	+2.0
Turnout		4,638	72.6	
Conservative hold		Swing		
Conservative hold		Swing		
Conservative hold		Swing		

=== West Barnes ===
West Barnes
Party	Candidate	Votes	%	±%
Liberal Democrats	Mary-Jane Jeanes	1,970	39.0	−1.0
Liberal Democrats	Iain Dysart	1,915	38.0	−0.3
Conservative	Gilli Lewis-Lavender*	1,900	37.7	−8.2
Conservative	Brian Lewis-Lavender	1,854	36.7	−7.5
Conservative	Sarah McAlister	1,728	34.2	−8.1
Liberal Democrats	Nazir Malik	1,675	33.2	−2.5
Labour	Ruth Bailham	900	17.8	+4.5
Labour	Danny Connellan	812	16.1	+3.1
Labour	Michael Somerville	690	13.7	+2.5
Independent	Angela Caldara*	381	7.6	−36.6
Green	Francis Cluer	357	7.1	N/A
Turnout		5,046	71.8	
Liberal Democrats gain from Conservative		Swing		
Liberal Democrats gain from Conservative		Swing		
Conservative hold		Swing		

=== Wimbledon Park ===
Wimbledon Park
Party	Candidate	Votes	%	±%
Conservative	Tariq Ahmad*	2,310	43.1	−13.3
Conservative	Janice Howard	2,293	42.8	−14.6
Conservative	Oonagh Moulton*	2,198	41.0	−16.5
Liberal Democrats	Dave Busby	1,548	28.9	+8.5
Liberal Democrats	Alice Munro	1,440	26.9	+9.5
Liberal Democrats	Edward Doran	1,380	25.7	+8.7
Labour	Hugh Constant	1,104	20.6	−0.5
Labour	Tony Mendes	960	17.9	−2.7
Labour	Anthony Draper	867	16.2	−2.6
Green	Samantha Guy	440	8.2	N/A
Green	Richmond Crowhurst	349	6.5	N/A
UKIP	Mark McAleer	204	3.8	N/A
Turnout		5,360	68.7	
Conservative hold		Swing		
Conservative hold		Swing		
Conservative hold		Swing		

== By-Elections ==
Wimbledon Park by-election, 3 May 2012
Party	Candidate	Votes	%	±%
Conservative	Ms. Linda Taylor	1,837	47.6	+4.5
Labour	Ms. Louise Deegan	931	24.1	+3.5
Liberal Democrats	Dave Busby	838	21.7	−7.2
Green	Richmond Crowhurst	253	6.6	+0.1
Turnout			48.0	−20.7
Conservative hold		Swing		

The by-election was called following the resignation of Cllr. Tariq Ahmad.

Colliers Wood by-election, 8 August 2013
Party	Candidate	Votes	%	±%
Labour	Ms. Caroline Cooper-Marbiah	1,685	72.2	+23.9
Conservative	Peter Lord	441	18.9	−2.5
UKIP	Shafqat Janjua	157	6.7	N/A
Liberal Democrats	Phil Ling	52	2.2	−16.8
Turnout			29.9	−31.6
Labour hold		Swing		

The by-election was called following the death of Cllr. Gam Gurung.
