= 2006 Merton London Borough Council election =

- 4 May 2006

All 60 council seats on Merton London Borough Council
- Turnout: 42.9% (▲8.6%)
	First party	Second party	Third party
Party	Conservative	Labour	Merton Park RA
Last election	25 seats, 38.0%	32 seats, 37.1%	3 seats, 3.4%
Seats won	30	27	3
Seat change	▲5	▼5	Steady
Popular vote	72,559	56,664	4,815
Percentage	44.6%	34.8%	3.0%
Swing	▲6.6%	▼2.3%	▼0.4%
- Map of the results of the 2006 Merton council election. Conservatives in blue, Labour in red and Merton Park Ward Residents Association in white.
Council leader before election
Andrew Judge
Labour
Council leader after election
David Williams
Conservative

Elections for the London Borough of Merton were held on 4 May 2006. This was on the same day as other local elections in England.

The Conservatives became the largest party in Merton, forming a minority administration. The incumbent Labour majority administration was defeated.

== Results ==
The Conservatives gained five seats, becoming the largest party in Merton and defeating the incumbent majority Labour administration. However, the Conservatives fell one seat short of a majority, so they established a minority administration under no overall control.

The Merton Park Ward Residents' Association maintained its three councillors in Merton Park.

In terms of seat changes, the Conservatives gained three councillors from Labour in Abbey and one each from Labour in the wards of Dundonald and Trinity.

Merton local election result 2006
Party	Seats	Gains	Losses	Net gain/loss	Seats %	Votes %	Votes	+/−
Conservative	30	5	0	▲5	50.0%	44.6%	72,559	▲6.6%
Labour	27	0	5	▼5	45.0%	34.8%	56,664	▼2.3%
Merton Park RA	3	0	0	0	5.0%	3.0%	4,815	▼0.4%
Liberal Democrats	0	0	0	0	0%	12.0%	19,493	▲0.9%
Green	0	0	0	0	0%	3.8%	6,226	▼3.5%
BNP	0	0	0	0	0%	0.7%	1,092	▲0.5%
Pensions Action Alliance	0	0	0	0	0%	0.5%	788	n/a
UKIP	0	0	0	0	0%	0.3%	457	▼0.4%
Independent	0	0	0	0	0%	0.4%	583	n/a

== Results by ward ==
=== Abbey ===
Abbey
Party	Candidate	Votes	%	±%
Conservative	Diane Neil Mills	1,297	41.2	+8.7
Conservative	Marc Hanson	1,282	40.7	+8.8
Conservative	Henry Nelless	1,214	38.5	+10.5
Labour	Susan Assinen*	1,147	36.4	−3.5
Labour	Michael Brunt	1,087	34.5	−5.3
Labour	Laxmi Attawar	1,074	34.1	−2.9
Liberal Democrats	Pauline Barry	566	18.0	+1.4
Liberal Democrats	John Houilihan	470	14.9	−0.8
Green	Benjamin Walsh	443	14.1	+2.0
Liberal Democrats	David Willis	412	13.1	−0.4
Turnout		3,150	44.1	+16.7
Conservative gain from Labour		Swing		
Conservative gain from Labour		Swing		
Conservative gain from Labour		Swing		

=== Cannon Hill ===
Cannon Hill
Party	Candidate	Votes	%	±%
Conservative	William Brierly	1,778	54.6	+8.8
Conservative	Deborah Shears*	1,748	53.7	+6.0
Conservative	Brian Lewis-Lavender	1,681	51.7	+8.1
Labour	Christopher Houghton	814	25.0	−5.5
Labour	Henry Macauley	812	25.0	−2.4
Labour	Motiur Rahman	678	20.8	−6.0
Liberal Democrats	Mary O'Herlihy Nixon	450	13.8	+1.8
Liberal Democrats	Nelson Menezes	423	13.0	+1.6
Liberal Democrats	Christopher Oxford	416	12.8	+1.9
Pensioners Action Alliance	Michael Fitzgerald	383	11.8	N/A
Turnout		3,254	47.1	+4.2
Conservative hold		Swing		
Conservative hold		Swing		
Conservative hold		Swing		

=== Colliers Wood ===
Colliers Wood
Party	Candidate	Votes	%	±%
Labour	Nicholas Draper*	1,713	50.0	−1.6
Labour	Sheila Knight*	1,625	47.5	−3.3
Labour	George Reynolds*	1,577	46.1	−2.7
Green	Thomas Walsh	1,222	35.7	−0.8
Green	Rebecca Shingleton	1,152	33.6	+2.0
Green	Richard Bence	1,068	31.2	+2.0
Conservative	Philip Beard	398	11.6	+4.6
Conservative	Olivia Cooper	374	10.9	+4.8
Conservative	Eugene Byrne	353	10.3	+4.7
Liberal Democrats	James McKenna	262	7.7	N/A
Turnout		3,424	49.0	+11.2
Labour hold		Swing		
Labour hold		Swing		
Labour hold		Swing		

=== Cricket Green ===
Cricket Green
Party	Candidate	Votes	%	±%
Labour	Thomas Munn*	1,442	54.3	−0.8
Labour	Russell Makin*	1,377	51.8	−1.4
Labour	Judy Saunders*	1,361	51.2	+3.1
Conservative	Frederick Day	875	32.9	+6.4
Conservative	Sarah McAlister	767	28.9	+3.7
Conservative	Liam Staff	709	26.7	+3.8
Liberal Democrats	Nicholas Pizey	448	16.9	+1.6
Turnout		2,656	37.4	+7.1
Labour hold		Swing		
Labour hold		Swing		
Labour hold		Swing		

=== Dundonald ===
Dundonald
Party	Candidate	Votes	%	±%
Conservative	Corinna Edge*	1,328	42.7	+8.2
Conservative	Denise March	1,295	41.7	+6.2
Conservative	David Edge	1,272	40.9	+8.8
Liberal Democrats	Kirsty Armstrong	740	23.8	+3.4
Labour	Elizabeth Daughters	664	21.4	−12.5
Labour	Stan Anderson	664	21.4	−12.3
Liberal Democrats	Anthony Fairclough	648	20.8	+6.1
Labour	Wayne Busbridge	640	20.6	−12.1
Green	David Bezkorowajny	601	19.3	+4.5
Green	Jennifer Young	536	17.2	N/A
Liberal Democrats	Andrew Falconer	525	16.9	+2.5
Turnout		3,109	45.5	+11.9
Conservative hold		Swing		
Conservative hold		Swing		
Conservative gain from Labour		Swing		

=== Figge's Marsh ===
Figge's Marsh
Party	Candidate	Votes	%	±%
Labour	Andrew Judge*	1,549	57.3	+8.7
Labour	Agatha Akyigyina	1,512	55.9	+4.8
Labour	Geraldine Stanford*	1,437	53.2	−1.2
Conservative	Gordon Southcott	642	23.8	−1.2
Conservative	John Telford	635	23.5	+1.3
Conservative	Jenny Thomas	615	22.8	+0.8
Liberal Democrats	Elaine Patton	395	14.6	−2.2
UKIP	Graham Mills	232	8.6	N/A
Turnout		2,703	38.3	+9.7
Labour hold		Swing		
Labour hold		Swing		
Labour hold		Swing		

=== Graveney ===
Graveney
Party	Candidate	Votes	%	±%
Labour	Linda Kirby*	1,505	58.3	−0.6
Labour	John Dehaney*	1,500	58.1	+4.6
Labour	Gregory Udeh	1,233	47.8	−10.9
Conservative	Jeffrey Gunn	675	26.2	+4.7
Conservative	June Hayles	646	25.0	+4.2
Conservative	Gary Pritchard	590	22.9	+2.9
Liberal Democrats	Benedict Fletcher	534	20.7	+4.8
Turnout		2,580	37.3	+7.7
Labour hold		Swing		
Labour hold		Swing		
Labour hold		Swing		

=== Hillside ===
Hillside
Party	Candidate	Votes	%	±%
Conservative	Jeremy Bruce	1,400	58.9	+6.8
Conservative	David Williams*	1,353	56.9	+4.9
Conservative	David Simpson*	1,348	56.7	+7.2
Liberal Democrats	Juliet Boyd	439	18.5	±0.0
Liberal Democrats	Joan Pyke-Lees	401	16.9	−2.6
Labour	Christine Bickerstaff	396	16.7	−5.7
Liberal Democrats	Simon Burall	375	15.8	−2.5
Green	Nicholas Robins	351	14.8	+2.5
Labour	Peter McGinity	346	14.6	−6.6
Labour	Farmida Bi	314	13.2	−6.7
UKIP	James Stewart	89	3.7	N/A
Turnout		2,376	36.2	+6.0
Conservative hold		Swing		
Conservative hold		Swing		
Conservative hold		Swing		

=== Lavender Fields ===
Lavender Fields
Party	Candidate	Votes	%	±%
Labour	Mark Betteridge	1,142	54.9	−1.5
Labour	Mark Allison*	1,131	54.3	−1.3
Labour	Edith Macauley*	1,050	50.4	+2.0
Conservative	Stewart MacDonald	520	25.0	+0.9
Conservative	Thomas Lazur	449	21.6	−1.8
Conservative	Christina MacPherson	447	21.5	−1.3
Green	Michael Dees	435	20.9	+6.6
Liberal Democrats	Jonathan Holloway	377	18.1	+3.7
Turnout		2,082	31.5	+7.5
Labour hold		Swing		
Labour hold		Swing		
Labour hold		Swing		

=== Longthornton ===
Longthornton
Party	Candidate	Votes	%	±%
Labour	Stephen Austin*	1,687	53.5	+3.8
Labour	David Chung*	1,651	52.4	+5.7
Labour	Leighton Veale*	1,454	46.1	+5.5
Conservative	Charles Jenkins	1,170	37.1	−1.7
Conservative	Sarah Newton	1,136	36.0	−1.8
Conservative	Philip Lenon	1,113	35.3	−2.1
Liberal Democrats	Celia Lee	381	12.1	+0.3
Pensions Action Alliance	David Kay-Kreizman	219	6.9	
Turnout		3,153	47.5	+11.7
Labour hold		Swing		
Labour hold		Swing		
Labour hold		Swing		

=== Lower Morden ===
Lower Morden
Party	Candidate	Votes	%	±%
Conservative	Maurice Groves*	1,809	63.0	+9.2
Conservative	Barbara Mansfield	1,781	62.1	+15.9
Conservative	Ronald Wilson*	1,664	58.0	+11.9
Labour	Terence Daniels	711	24.8	−1.8
Labour	Mark Inger	682	23.8	−0.5
Labour	Michelle McNicol	587	20.5	−0.5
Liberal Democrats	Lina Akbar	402	14.0	+0.5
Turnout		2,870	43.3	+3.9
Conservative hold		Swing		
Conservative hold		Swing		
Conservative hold		Swing		

=== Merton Park ===
Merton Park
Party	Candidate	Votes	%	±%
Merton Park RA	Karin Forbes	1,626	48.9	−5.3
Merton Park RA	Peter Southgate*	1,619	48.7	−2.7
Merton Park RA	Krysia Wiliams	1,570	47.3	−3.9
Conservative	Simon Hooberman	1,159	34.9	+7.2
Conservative	Simon Manara	1,139	34.3	+7.9
Conservative	John Richardson	1,122	33.8	+7.9
Labour	Richard Nichols	370	11.1	−3.7
Labour	Carl Linkson	318	9.6	−3.9
Labour	Christopher Ostrowski	299	9.0	−3.8
Liberal Democrats	Maximilian Camplin	278	8.4	N/A
UKIP	Andrew Mills	136	4.1	−0.5
Turnout		3,322	48.9	+7.1
Merton Park RA hold		Swing		
Merton Park RA hold		Swing		
Merton Park RA hold		Swing		

=== Pollards Hill ===
Pollards Hill
Party	Candidate	Votes	%	±%
Labour	Martin Whelton*	1,351	49.4	+2.4
Labour	Zenia Squires-Jamison	1,321	48.3	−5.1
Labour	Richard Williams	1,223	44.7	−8.1
Conservative	Steven Abrahams	1,096	40.1	+8.5
Conservative	Richard Hilton	962	35.2	+6.3
Conservative	Raymond Tindle	915	33.5	+5.9
Liberal Democrats	Iain Dysart	351	12.8	+1.0
Turnout		2,735	38.2	+6.5
Labour hold		Swing		
Labour hold		Swing		
Labour hold		Swing		

=== Ravensbury ===
Ravensbury
Party	Candidate	Votes	%	±%
Labour	Stephen Alambritis*	1,311	44.0	−3.1
Labour	Philip Jones*	1,276	42.8	−7.0
Labour	Peter McCabe*	1,204	40.4	−7.4
Conservative	Thomas Cheetham	1,106	37.1	+6.4
Conservative	Margaret Groves	1,010	33.9	+5.5
Conservative	Adrian Roberts	905	30.4	+2.7
BNP	David Clarke	493	16.5	N/A
Liberal Democrats	Violet Jennings	436	14.6	−3.5
Turnout		2,980	44.3	+15.3
Labour hold		Swing		
Labour hold		Swing		
Labour hold		Swing		

=== Raynes Park ===
Raynes Park
Party	Candidate	Votes	%	±%
Conservative	Margaret Brierly*	1,745	59.7	+10.3
Conservative	Linda Scott	1,682	57.6	+12.4
Conservative	Roderick Scott	1,640	56.1	+13.0
Liberal Democrats	Julie Barnes	578	19.8	−11.1
Labour	Stephen Spence	501	17.2	+1.1
Labour	Brian Paul	489	16.7	+0.7
Liberal Democrats	Christopher Eglington	462	15.8	−13.3
Liberal Democrats	Nazir Malik	430	14.7	−9.2
Labour	Gladstone Dosunmu	420	14.4	−0.7
Green	Emma Wyatt-King	418	14.3	+5.5
Turnout		2,921	42.2	+3.7
Conservative hold		Swing		
Conservative hold		Swing		
Conservative hold		Swing		

=== St Helier ===
St Helier
Party	Candidate	Votes	%	±%
Labour	Maxi Martin*	1,347	43.2	−1.0
Labour	Dennis Pearce*	1,246	39.9	−4.8
Labour	Patricia Lewis	1,196	38.3	−0.9
Conservative	Christopher McLaughlin	974	31.2	+6.4
Conservative	David Shellhorn	931	29.8	+5.6
Conservative	Alexander van Ingen	778	24.9	+1.1
BNP	John Clarke	599	19.2	+5.1
Independent	Michael Spacey*	583	18.7	−20.5
Liberal Democrats	Alastair Irvine	430	13.8	−1.3
Turnout		3,121	46.7	+14.2
Labour hold		Swing		
Labour hold		Swing		
Labour hold		Swing		

=== Trinity ===
Trinity
Party	Candidate	Votes	%	±%
Conservative	David Dean	1,454	51.7	+14.0
Conservative	Krystal Miller	1,444	51.3	+13.9
Conservative	Simon Withey	1,366	48.5	+12.0
Labour	Andrew Coles*	914	32.5	−4.0
Labour	Christopher Magee	798	28.4	−7.7
Labour	Syed Rivzi	757	26.9	−5.2
Liberal Democrats	Sally Harlow	498	17.7	+3.1
Liberal Democrats	Simon Gilhooley	497	17.7	+4.0
Liberal Democrats	Richard Tibbetts	442	15.7	+3.1
Turnout		2,814	41.0	+7.9
Conservative hold		Swing		
Conservative hold		Swing		
Conservative gain from Labour		Swing		

=== Village ===
Village
Party	Candidate	Votes	%	±%
Conservative	Samantha George*	2,426	80.4	+12.0
Conservative	John Bowcott*	2,414	80.0	+10.2
Conservative	Richard Chellew	2,358	78.2	+8.2
Liberal Democrats	Anne Blanchard	357	11.8	−0.4
Liberal Democrats	Claire Glasgow	285	9.4	−2.6
Labour	William Bottriell	279	9.3	−4.2
Liberal Democrats	Andrew Harding	264	8.8	−2.1
Labour	Richard Taylor	216	7.2	−5.5
Labour	Anil Ohri	203	6.7	+5.9
Turnout		3,016	47.5	+9.7
Conservative hold		Swing		
Conservative hold		Swing		
Conservative hold		Swing		

=== West Barnes ===
West Barnes
Party	Candidate	Votes	%	±%
Conservative	Gillian Lewis-Lavender*	1,578	45.9	+2.4
Conservative	Angela Caldara*	1,517	44.2	+4.1
Conservative	Jonathan Ward	1,453	42.3	−0.3
Liberal Democrats	Mary-Jane Jeanes	1,373	40.0	+1.8
Liberal Democrats	Helen Herd	1,317	38.3	+5.2
Liberal Democrats	Peter Taylor	1,226	35.7	+4.7
Labour	Torbjorn Anderson	458	13.3	−3.6
Labour	Daniel Connellan	447	13.0	−2.3
Labour	Thomas Searle	386	11.2	−1.9
Pensions Action Alliance	Geoffrey Smith	186	5.4	N/A
Turnout		3,435	49.8	+9.7
Conservative hold		Swing		
Conservative hold		Swing		
Conservative hold		Swing		

=== Wimbledon Park ===
Wimbledon Park
Party	Candidate	Votes	%	±%
Conservative	Oonagh Moulton*	1,683	57.5	+21.2
Conservative	Stephen Kerin	1,682	57.4	+19.6
Conservative	Tariq Ahmad*	1,650	56.4	+21.3
Labour	Michael Goodman	618	21.1	−5.4
Labour	Tony Mendes	603	20.6	−2.4
Liberal Democrats	Helen Carter	597	20.4	+11.3
Labour	Masood Ahmed	551	18.8	−2.5
Liberal Democrats	Edward Furse	510	17.4	+9.0
Liberal Democrats	Richard Ladmore	498	17.0	N/A
Turnout		2,928	41.7	+1.1
Conservative hold		Swing		
Conservative hold		Swing		
Conservative hold		Swing		
