= 2026 Merton London Borough Council election =

2026 English local government election

- 7 May 2026

All 57 seats to Merton London Borough Council 29 seats needed for a majority
- Turnout: 45.15%
	First party	Second party
Leader	Ross Garrod	Anthony Fairclough
Party	Labour	Liberal Democrats
Last election	31 seats, 42.3%	17 seats, 25.0%
Seats before	30	17 (Note: Includes the vacant seat in Cannon Hill that was last held by the Liberal Democrats.)
Seats won	32	19
Seat change	▲1	▲2
Popular vote	59,193	53,195
Percentage	30.8%	27.7%
Swing	▼11.5pp	▲2.7pp
	Third party	Fourth party
Leader	Nick McLean	Edward Foley
Party	Conservative	Merton Park RA
Last election	7 seats, 26.1%	2 seats, 2.1%
Seats before	7	2
Seats won	4	2
Seat change	▼3	Steady
Popular vote	29,381	3,714
Percentage	15.3%	1.9%
Swing	▼10.8pp	▼0.2pp
- Map of the results of the 2026 Merton council election. Conservatives in blue, Labour in red, Liberal Democrats in orange and Merton Park Ward Residents Association in white.
Leader before election
Ross Garrod
Labour
Leader after election
Ross Garrod
Labour

The 2026 Merton London Borough Council election took place on 7 May 2026. All 57 members of Merton London Borough Council were elected. The elections took place alongside local elections in the other London boroughs and elections to local authorities across the United Kingdom.

The election saw Labour retain its majority on the council.

== Background ==
In 2022, Labour held control of Merton Council although their leader lost his seat to the Liberal Democrats who became the official opposition on the Council for the first time. In January 2026, the pollster Lord Hayward suggested that the Liberal Democrats could mount a significant challenge to Labour in Merton at the 2026 local elections, suggesting the borough was one where the party could potentially take control.

== Previous council composition ==
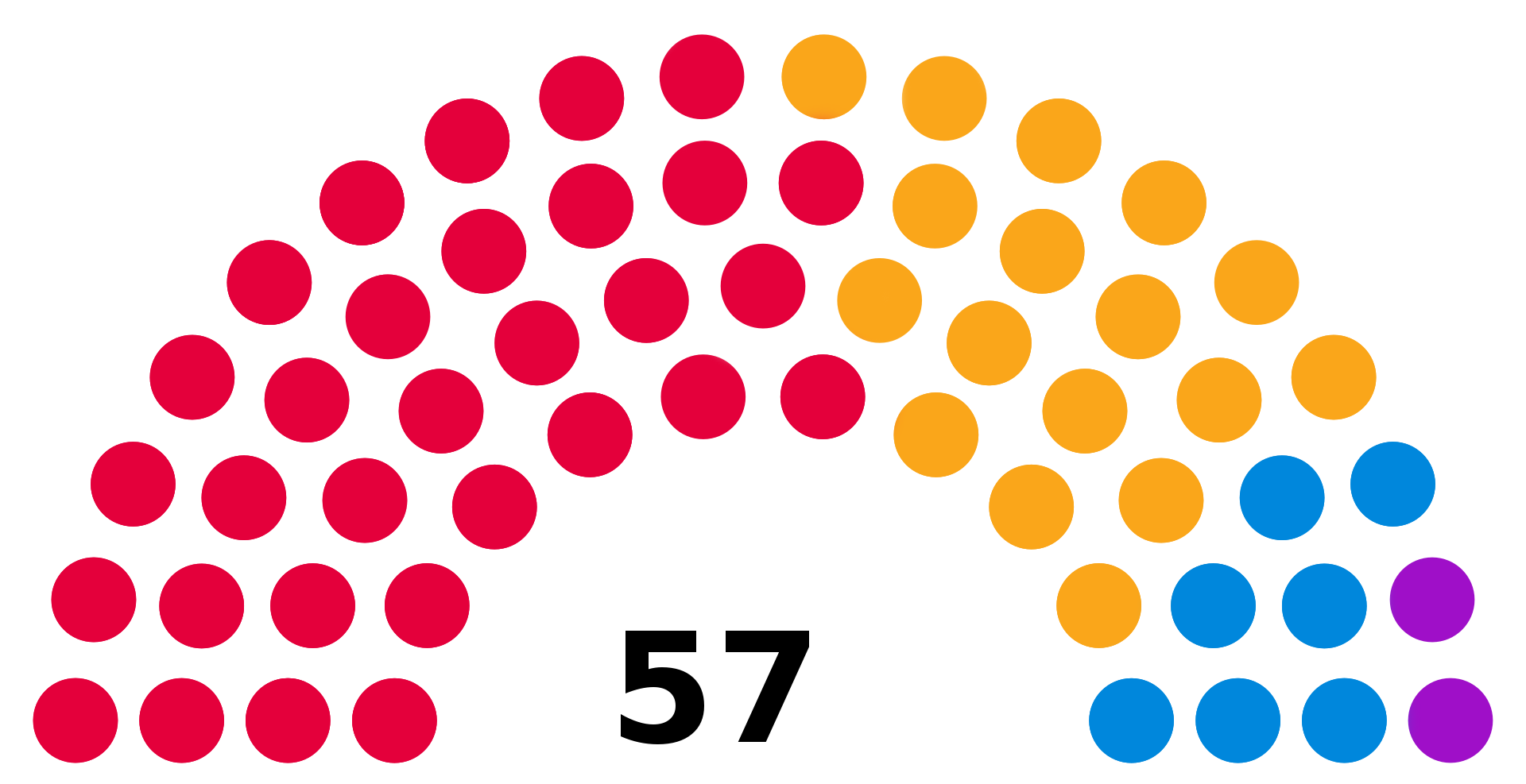
Council composition after the 2022 election

Council composition As of March 2026

Council composition after the 2026 election

After 2022 election		Before 2026 election		After 2026 election	
Party	Seats	Party	Seats	Party	Seats
Labour	31	Labour	29	Labour	32
Liberal Democrats	17	Liberal Democrats	16	Liberal Democrats	19
Conservative	7	Conservative	7	Conservative	4
Merton Park RA	2	Merton Park RA	2	Merton Park RA	2
Independent	0	Independent	1	Independent	0
Vacant	N/A	Vacant	2	Vacant	N/A

Changes 2022–2026:

- January 2024: Caroline Charles (Labour) suspended from party
- May 2024: Natasha Irons (Labour) and Helena Dollimore (Labour) resign – by-elections held July 2024
- July 2024: Franca Ofeimu (Labour) and Shuile Syeda (Labour) win by-elections
- January 2026: Jenifer Gould (Liberal Democrats) resigns – seat left vacant until 2026 election
- April 2026: Marsie Skeete (Labour) dies – seat left vacant until 2026 election

== Results summary ==
2026 Merton London Borough Council election
Party	Seats	Gains	Losses	Net gain/loss	Seats %	Votes %	Votes	+/−
Labour	32	2	1	▲1	56.1%	30.8%	59,193	▼11.5pp
Liberal Democrats	19	3	1	▲2	33.3%	27.7%	53,195	▲2.7pp
Conservative	4	0	3	▼3	7.0%	15.3%	29,381	▼10.8pp
Merton Park RA	2	0	0	0	3.5%	1.9%	3,714	▼0.2pp
Green	0	0	0	0	0%	12.3%	23,590	▲8.0pp
Reform	0	0	0	0	0%	11.9%	22,775	New
Animal Welfare	0	0	0	Steady	0%	0.06%	108	New
Independent	0	0	0	Steady	0%	0.02%	48	New
Libertarian	0	0	0	0	0%	0.02%	31	New
Total	57						192,036	

== Ward results ==
=== Abbey ===
Abbey (3)
Party	Candidate	Votes	%	±%
Liberal Democrats	John Braithwaite*	1,594	44.5	+6.9
Liberal Democrats	Klaar Dresselaers*	1,452	40.5	+6.8
Liberal Democrats	Barry Smith	1,370	38.2	+4.7
Labour	Kara Abrams	953	26.6	−7.4
Labour	Andrew Copeland	820	22.9	−10.0
Labour	Shajaki Jeyaveerasingam	701	19.6	−12.1
Green	George Burridge	676	18.9	+7.5
Green	James Sellers	622	17.4	N/A
Conservative	Nigel Benbow	507	14.2	−12.8
Conservative	Ellie Ioannou	399	11.1	−13.8
Conservative	Cleon Wilson	351	9.8	−13.3
Reform	Zoe Miller	289	8.1	N/A
Reform	Clark Inglis	275	7.7	N/A
Reform	Simon Ogilvie-Harris	268	7.5	N/A
Turnout		3,582	46.9	
Liberal Democrats hold		Swing		
Liberal Democrats gain from Labour		Swing		
Liberal Democrats hold		Swing		

=== Cannon Hill ===
Cannon Hill (3)
Party	Candidate	Votes	%	±%
Liberal Democrats	Richard Poole	1,379	35.0	+3.8
Liberal Democrats	Asif Ashraf	1,376	34.9	+2.6
Liberal Democrats	Robert Mitchell	1,278	32.4	−4.3
Conservative	Nick McLean*	1,038	26.3	−8.6
Conservative	Michael Paterson*	926	23.5	−9.4
Conservative	Frank Pocock	880	22.3	−9.2
Labour	Elizabeth Sherwood	702	17.8	−11.2
Green	Emma Alexander	659	16.7	+8.4
Labour	Mohammad Ashraf	629	16.0	−11.2
Labour	Neil Davies	625	15.9	−11.1
Green	Margaret Rogers	503	12.8	N/A
Reform	Troy Bowler	474	12.0	N/A
Reform	Paul Gaskin	466	11.8	N/A
Reform	John Wigmore	439	11.1	N/A
Turnout		3,943	55.0	
Liberal Democrats hold		Swing		
Liberal Democrats gain from Conservative		Swing		
Liberal Democrats gain from Conservative		Swing		

=== Colliers Wood ===
Colliers Wood (3)
Party	Candidate	Votes	%	±%
Labour	Caroline Cooper-Marbiah*	1,807	45.5	−16.4
Labour	Stuart Neaverson*	1,763	44.4	−6.3
Labour	Joanna Sieradzinska	1,494	37.6	−21.1
Green	Conor Dunwoody	950	23.9	−3.8
Liberal Democrats	Jenny Booth	886	22.3	+13.3
Liberal Democrats	George Hadjiyiannakis	772	19.4	+9.8
Green	Fevzi Hussein	763	19.2	−3.4
Green	Mehmood Naqshbandi	746	18.8	N/A
Liberal Democrats	John Oliver	651	16.4	+8.9
Conservative	Andrew Cole	315	7.9	−5.1
Reform	Olivier Beumer	281	7.1	N/A
Reform	William Richards	259	6.5	N/A
Conservative	Rob Cossins	255	6.4	−5.6
Reform	Edward Smith	244	6.1	N/A
Conservative	Martin Lake	243	6.1	−5.5
Independent	Alex Forbes	48	1.2	N/A
Turnout		3,975	47.2	
Labour hold		Swing		
Labour hold		Swing		
Labour hold		Swing		

=== Cricket Green ===
Cricket Green (3)
Party	Candidate	Votes	%	±%
Labour	Michael Butcher*	1,576	50.4	−19.2
Labour	Usaama Kaweesa*	1,510	48.3	−20.7
Labour	Gill Manly*	1,492	47.7	−23.0
Green	Ryan Letbe-Holder	553	17.7	+7.0
Green	Adele Pinkett	549	17.5	N/A
Reform	Richard Law	530	16.9	N/A
Reform	Casey Powell	462	14.8	N/A
Reform	Artem Mikheev	424	13.6	N/A
Conservative	Eleanor Cox	316	10.1	−6.7
Liberal Democrats	William Woodward	300	9.6	+4.9
Liberal Democrats	Vivian Vella	296	9.5	+1.9
Liberal Democrats	Yu Wong	266	8.5	+1.4
Conservative	Debbie Wills	217	6.9	−6.8
Conservative	Peter Ludvigsen	210	6.7	−6.8
Turnout		3,129	37.2	
Labour hold		Swing		
Labour hold		Swing		
Labour hold		Swing		

=== Figge's Marsh ===
Figge's Marsh (3)
Party	Candidate	Votes	%	±%
Labour	Agatha Akyigyina*	1,569	58.0	−20.6
Labour	Dan Johnston*	1,374	50.8	−19.4
Labour	Franca Ofeimu*	1,323	48.9	−26.5
Green	Omar Daair	503	18.6	N/A
Green	Sally Pannifex	435	16.1	+7.2
Green	Johnathan Knight	408	15.1	N/A
Reform	Ronan Fraser	356	13.2	N/A
Reform	Steeve Mandarin	326	12.1	N/A
Reform	Vinayak Malhotra	320	11.8	N/A
Liberal Democrats	Elizabeth Barker	235	8.7	+2.6
Conservative	Alice Hammond	176	6.5	−4.2
Liberal Democrats	Matthew Payne	172	6.4	+1.8
Conservative	Sally Hammond	164	6.1	−5.6
Liberal Democrats	Emma Wiley	141	5.2	+1.1
Conservative	William Woodroofe	133	4.9	−5.4
Turnout		2,705	35.7	
Labour hold		Swing		
Labour hold		Swing		
Labour hold		Swing		

=== Graveney ===
Graveney (3)
Party	Candidate	Votes	%	±%
Labour	Linda Kirby*	1,778	55.1	−20.3
Labour	Billy Hayes*	1,607	49.8	−19.7
Labour	Devina Paul	1,562	48.4	−24.1
Green	Franki Appleton	832	25.8	N/A
Green	Darrell Ennis-Gayle	727	22.5	N/A
Green	Rupert Stevens	607	18.8	+4.2
Conservative	Beth Mitchell	308	9.5	−3.8
Liberal Democrats	Iain Coleman	284	8.8	+1.9
Reform	Ivana Jurcevic	281	8.7	N/A
Conservative	Thomas Moulton	257	8.0	−4.6
Reform	James Oakenfull	257	8.0	N/A
Reform	Charles Williams	254	7.9	N/A
Conservative	Caitilin Smith	240	7.4	−3.8
Liberal Democrats	Man Yip	199	6.2	+0.5
Liberal Democrats	Hamish Norbrook	196	6.1	+1.2
Turnout		3,229	38.3	
Labour hold		Swing		
Labour hold		Swing		
Labour hold		Swing		

=== Hillside ===
Hillside (2)
Party	Candidate	Votes	%	±%
Liberal Democrats	Sarah Golby	1,366	44.3	+1.9
Conservative	Dan Holden*	1,089	35.3	−5.3
Liberal Democrats	Richard Shillito	1,063	34.5	−4.0
Conservative	Suzanne Grocott	944	30.6	−8.3
Green	Nick Robins	424	13.7	N/A
Labour	Catherine Kagau	318	10.3	−9.4
Labour	Robert Newbery	286	9.3	−8.5
Reform	Angus Murray	241	7.8	N/A
Reform	Guy Winterflood	206	6.7	N/A
Turnout		3,085	49.2	
Liberal Democrats hold		Swing		
Conservative hold		Swing		

=== Lavender Fields ===
Lavender Fields (3)
Party	Candidate	Votes	%	±%
Labour	Edith Macauley*	1,316	45.4	−22.4
Labour	Harry Platts	1,170	40.4	−26.2
Labour	Slawek Szczepanski*	1,126	38.8	−19.8
Green	Emma Donegan	641	22.1	+6.7
Green	Gareth Davidson	615	21.2	N/A
Green	Dom Teuma	485	16.7	N/A
Reform	Amanda Ashford	475	16.4	N/A
Reform	John Furness	444	15.3	N/A
Reform	Gina Harper	437	15.1	N/A
Liberal Democrats	Emily Robertson	293	10.1	−1.3
Liberal Democrats	Malcolm Brown	284	9.8	+2.8
Conservative	Vivian Aku-Barton	243	8.4	−9.3
Liberal Democrats	Cosmo Lupton	220	7.6	+2.7
Conservative	Capri Fox	199	6.9	−9.8
Conservative	Gary Pritchard	196	6.8	−6.8
Animal Welfare	Mike Kelson	108	3.7	N/A
Libertarian	Marco Bocci	31	1.1	N/A
Turnout		2,899	36.0	
Labour hold		Swing		
Labour hold		Swing		
Labour hold		Swing		

=== Longthornton ===
Longthornton (3)
Party	Candidate	Votes	%	±%
Labour	Brenda Fraser*	1,637	54.1	−18.1
Labour	Ross Garrod*	1,494	49.4	−14.8
Labour	Sonia Phillips	1,472	48.7	−12.5
Green	Christopher Stanton	641	21.2	+8.4
Green	Ann Strydom	597	19.7	N/A
Reform	Jonathan Deane	386	12.8	N/A
Reform	Leslie King	338	11.2	N/A
Reform	Ryan Powell	326	10.8	N/A
Conservative	Roger Drage	311	10.3	−7.2
Conservative	Kelly Hockey	295	9.8	−6.6
Conservative	Hugo Summerson	259	8.6	−7.5
Liberal Democrats	Mary-Jane Jeanes	241	8.0	−0.4
Liberal Democrats	Christine Peace	199	6.6	−1.0
Liberal Democrats	Savas Nicolaides	187	6.2	−1.2
Turnout		3,024	37.1	
Labour hold		Swing		
Labour hold		Swing		
Labour hold		Swing		

=== Lower Morden ===
Lower Morden (3)
Party	Candidate	Votes	%	±%
Labour	Sally Kenny*	1,604	36.3	−12.8
Labour	Dan Hogan	1,499	34.0	−10.1
Labour	Daniel Shearer	1,379	31.2	−11.1
Reform	Fraser Robertson	1,088	24.7	N/A
Reform	Elizabeth Weeks	1,051	23.8	N/A
Reform	Rohan Kempadoo	1,001	22.7	N/A
Conservative	Joe Hackett	908	20.6	−21.8
Conservative	Jack Gebhard	894	20.3	−20.8
Conservative	Harry Todd	821	18.6	−21.9
Green	Martin Astrand	608	13.8	+3.2
Liberal Democrats	Vincent Bolt	540	12.2	+4.7
Green	Ahmed Nasir	522	11.8	N/A
Liberal Democrats	Georgina Dilali	416	9.4	+3.4
Liberal Democrats	Guy Mercer	356	8.1	+2.9
Turnout		4,413	51.6	
Labour hold		Swing		
Labour hold		Swing		
Labour gain from Conservative		Swing		

=== Merton Park ===
Merton Park (2)
Party	Candidate	Votes	%	±%
Merton Park RA	Edward Foley*	1,916	59.4	−1.7
Merton Park RA	Stephen Mercer*	1,798	55.7	−1.1
Green	Melinda Balatoni	443	13.7	+8.0
Liberal Democrats	Emma Maddison	406	12.6	+2.9
Labour	Elizabeth Hawes	381	11.8	−7.2
Liberal Democrats	Christopher Oxford	286	8.9	+3.1
Labour	Shirley Pritchard	286	8.9	−7.5
Conservative	Hayley Ormrod	213	6.6	−4.8
Reform	Christopher Dunn	202	6.3	N/A
Conservative	Yuriy Lysenko	182	5.6	−5.4
Reform	Ricky Bello	181	5.6	N/A
Turnout		3,227	52.2	
Merton Park RA hold		Swing		
Merton Park RA hold		Swing		

=== Pollards Hill ===
Pollards Hill (3)
Party	Candidate	Votes	%	±%
Labour	Joan Henry*	1,696	57.7	−20.4
Labour	Martin Whelton*	1,574	53.5	−18.7
Labour	Ryan Rodrigues	1,556	52.9	−19.3
Green	Zainul Abadeen	643	21.9	+14.9
Reform	Chun Yin Cheung	428	14.6	N/A
Reform	Sandy Gretton	425	14.5	N/A
Reform	Irene Perdomo	396	13.5	N/A
Liberal Democrats	Anne Blanchard	256	8.7	+3.6
Conservative	Stephen Crowe	225	7.7	−7.1
Conservative	Michael Ormrod	207	7.0	−7.2
Conservative	Anton Gjeta	201	6.8	−7.1
Liberal Democrats	Susie Hicks**	198	6.7	+1.8
Liberal Democrats	Nicholas Harris	184	6.3	+2.7
Turnout		2,941	34.8	
Labour hold		Swing		
Labour hold		Swing		
Labour hold		Swing		

=== Ravensbury ===
Ravensbury (3)
Party	Candidate	Votes	%	±%
Labour	Stephen Alambritis*	1,321	43.3	−24.8
Labour	Val Hoppichler	1,172	38.4	−30.0
Labour	Peter McCabe*	1,158	37.9	−23.3
Liberal Democrats	Christopher Michael Bird	815	26.7	+18.0
Liberal Democrats	Edward Marsh	696	22.8	+14.9
Liberal Democrats	David Miller-Holland	575	18.8	+11.8
Green	Nicholas Prangnell	532	17.4	+4.0
Reform	James Bogle	526	17.2	N/A
Reform	Simon Goldstein	509	16.7	N/A
Reform	Alexander Smith	478	15.7	N/A
Conservative	Julia Cox	235	7.7	−9.8
Conservative	Jeremy Klerck	175	5.7	−10.4
Conservative	Brian Lewis-Lavender	173	5.7	−9.6
Turnout		3,053	45.4	
Labour hold		Swing		
Labour hold		Swing		
Labour hold		Swing		

=== Raynes Park ===
Raynes Park (3)
Party	Candidate	Votes	%	±%
Liberal Democrats	Victoria Wilson*	2,093	48.7	+3.8
Liberal Democrats	Chessie Flack*	2,087	48.6	+4.3
Liberal Democrats	Matthew Willis*	2,072	48.2	+5.0
Conservative	Michael Bull	735	17.1	−14.6
Green	Angela Manser	659	15.3	+4.9
Conservative	Nigel Popham	655	15.2	−16.0
Green	Richard Evans	626	14.6	N/A
Labour	Sandy Cowling	610	14.2	−4.7
Conservative	Sivas Ranjan	560	13.0	−17.2
Labour	Mark Featherston	556	12.9	−4.5
Labour	Timothy McLoughlin	461	10.7	−5.6
Reform	Darren Manning	432	10.1	N/A
Reform	Charles McSwiggan	410	9.5	N/A
Reform	Kadir Kadir	397	9.2	N/A
Turnout		4,298	48.5	
Liberal Democrats hold		Swing		
Liberal Democrats hold		Swing		
Liberal Democrats hold		Swing		

=== St Helier ===
St Helier (3)
Party	Candidate	Votes	%	±%
Labour	Andrew Judge*	1,215	38.7	−16.4
Labour	Nedra Daniel	1,209	38.5	−22.3
Labour	Shuile Syeda*	1,135	36.2	−18.7
Green	Pippa Maslin	929	29.6	+12.8
Green	Steve Coles	834	26.6	+11.8
Green	Benjamin Smith	761	24.3	+14.4
Reform	Christopher Lovejoy	537	17.1	N/A
Reform	Andrew Parr	508	16.2	N/A
Reform	Assana Haghi	485	15.5	N/A
Liberal Democrats	Hermione Peace	296	9.4	+2.8
Conservative	Charlie Beale	276	8.8	−11.9
Conservative	Sophia Paterson	248	7.9	−10.2
Conservative	Joshua Harmston-Gething	239	7.6	−9.0
Liberal Democrats	Sarah Weber	235	7.5	+1.0
Liberal Democrats	John Raymond	220	7.0	+1.9
Turnout		3,138	41.0	
Labour hold		Swing		
Labour hold		Swing		
Labour hold		Swing		

=== Village ===
Village (3)
Party	Candidate	Votes	%	±%
Conservative	Max Austin*	2,169	46.5	−3.5
Conservative	Jan Comer	1,973	42.3	−8.3
Conservative	Will Orson	1,939	41.5	−7.0
Liberal Democrats	Ursula Faulkner	1,701	36.4	+3.5
Liberal Democrats	Iain Wadie	1,542	33.0	+0.9
Liberal Democrats	Leo Liao	1,478	31.7	+1.1
Green	Rachel Eileen Brooks	441	9.4	−1.9
Reform	Fiona Beumer	421	9.0	N/A
Reform	Alistair Boyd	395	8.5	N/A
Labour	Andrea Colquhoun	377	8.1	−4.9
Labour	Ann Gillespie	347	7.4	−4.8
Reform	Eoin Fraser	337	7.2	N/A
Labour	Margaret Tulloch	323	6.9	−4.8
Turnout		4,667	53.2	
Conservative hold		Swing		
Conservative hold		Swing		
Conservative hold		Swing		

=== Wandle ===
Wandle (2)
Party	Candidate	Votes	%	±%
Labour	Eleanor Stringer*	1,155	40.9	+7.1
Labour	Sebastian Budner	1,076	38.1	+4.9
Liberal Democrats	Kirsten Galea*	986	34.9	+0.4
Liberal Democrats	Philip Ling	864	30.6	−0.1
Green	Gideon Tarry	438	15.5	+3.9
Reform	Richard Dalton	238	8.4	N/A
Reform	Jeremy Singer	218	7.7	N/A
Conservative	Thomas McCall	192	6.8	−16.6
Conservative	Oonagh Moulton	185	6.6	−15.0
Turnout		2,822	51.4	
Labour gain from Liberal Democrats		Swing		
Labour hold		Swing		

=== West Barnes ===
West Barnes (3)
Party	Candidate	Votes	%	±%
Liberal Democrats	Hina Bokhari*	1,816	47.5	+1.3
Liberal Democrats	Robert Page*	1,560	40.8	+3.1
Liberal Democrats	Mariam Hakim	1,540	40.3	−4.7
Labour	Oenone Flambert	666	17.4	−2.5
Conservative	Gilli Lewis-Lavender	664	17.4	−13.7
Conservative	Sarah McAlister	618	16.2	−12.8
Conservative	Teresa Engley	614	16.1	−12.8
Green	Charles Barraball	610	16.0	+3.7
Labour	Rebecca Tate	567	14.8	−4.8
Green	Susan O'Connor	517	13.5	N/A
Labour	John Townsend	484	12.7	−6.6
Reform	Christopher McLaughlin	449	11.8	N/A
Reform	Petra Frolkova	420	11.0	N/A
Reform	Alex Pinna	406	10.6	N/A
Turnout		3,820	49.4	
Liberal Democrats hold		Swing		
Liberal Democrats hold		Swing		
Liberal Democrats hold		Swing		

=== Wimbledon Park ===
Wimbledon Park (3)
Party	Candidate	Votes	%	±%
Liberal Democrats	Jil Hall*	2,078	55.0	+12.9
Liberal Democrats	Tony Reiss*	1,853	49.0	+9.6
Liberal Democrats	Nick Thomas	1,777	47.0	+7.1
Green	Juliet Boyd	741	19.6	+2.4
Conservative	Janice Howard	610	16.1	−12.5
Conservative	Andrew Howard	604	16.0	−14.6
Conservative	Linda Taylor	552	14.6	−15.9
Labour	Hugh Constant	538	14.2	−8.5
Green	James Robson	510	13.5	N/A
Labour	David Cowling	444	11.7	−8.9
Labour	Terry Daniels	392	10.4	−7.6
Reform	John Pearson	284	7.5	N/A
Reform	Stephen Gibson	280	7.4	N/A
Reform	Edward Powell	263	7.0	N/A
Turnout		3,779	46.8	
Liberal Democrats hold		Swing		
Liberal Democrats hold		Swing		
Liberal Democrats hold		Swing		

=== Wimbledon Town and Dundonald ===
Wimbledon Town and Dundonald (3)
Party	Candidate	Votes	%	±%
Liberal Democrats	Samantha MacArthur*	2,664	58.1	−0.7
Liberal Democrats	Anthony Fairclough*	2,618	57.1	+2.2
Liberal Democrats	Simon McGrath*	2,287	49.9	−0.3
Green	Huw Buckley	840	18.3	+5.5
Labour	Abigail Jones	793	17.3	+1.6
Conservative	Anthony Cole	634	13.8	−11.7
Conservative	Sarah Poole	620	13.5	−10.0
Conservative	Katie Russell	589	12.9	−10.3
Labour	Peter Payne	571	12.5	−0.5
Labour	Joel Winter	544	11.9	−0.4
Reform	Lisa Bassett	339	7.4	N/A
Reform	Timothy Becker	308	6.7	N/A
Reform	John Bradbury	306	6.7	N/A
Turnout		4,583	51.2	
Liberal Democrats hold		Swing		
Liberal Democrats hold		Swing		
Liberal Democrats hold		Swing		
