= 1998 Merton London Borough Council election =

1998 local election in England

- 7 May 1998

All 57 seats up for election to Merton London Borough Council 29 seats needed for a majority
- Registered: 130,656
- Turnout: 49,633, 37.99% (▼11.52%)

	First party	Second party
Leader	Michael A. Brunt	Unknown
Party	Labour	Conservative
Leader since	1997	Unknown
Leader's seat	Dundonald	Unknown
Last election	40 seats, 48.52%	10 seats, 30.16%
Seats won	39	12
Seat change	▼1	▲2
Popular vote	57,753	43,021
Percentage	44.16%	32.89%
Swing	▼4.36%	▲2.73%
	Third party	Fourth party
Leader	Unknown	Unknown
Party	Liberal Democrats	Merton Park RA
Leader since	Unknown	Unknown
Leader's seat	Unknown	Unknown
Last election	3 seats, 12.11%	3 seats, 3.46%
Seats won	3	3
Seat change	Steady	Steady
Popular vote	18,881	4,415
Percentage	14.44%	3.38%
Swing	▲2.32%	▼0.08%
Council control before election
Labour
Council control after election
Labour

Elections for the London Borough of Merton were held on 7 May 1998 to elect members of Merton London Borough Council in London, England. This was on the same day as other local elections in England and a referendum on the Greater London Authority; in the latter, Merton voted in favour of creating the Greater London Authority by 72.2% on a 37.6% turnout.

The whole council was up for election and the Labour Party stayed in overall control of the council, despite losing one seat.

There were some minor ward boundary changes which came into effect in December 1994; these affected Merton's boundaries with Sutton and Croydon. However, the number of council seats remained at fifty-seven. This would be the last election under these boundaries: in 2002, the number of seats was increased by 3 and all ward boundaries were redrawn.

== Background ==
In between the 1994 election and this election there were a total of 2 by-elections to replace councillors who died in office, however these did not result in the seats changing parties. In addition to these a Labour councillor defected to a third party, which meant the composition of the council just before the election was as follows:

↓
39	3	3	10	2
Labour	Lib Dem	Merton Park	Conservative	Other

== Election results ==
The incumbent Labour majority administration lost two seats to the Consergainves and gained one seat from Longthornton and Tamworth Residents Association, whose last councillor was elected in 1994 and no longer sat for the party; the party did not contest the election.

Merton Park Ward Residents Association and the Liberal Democrats maintained their three seats each in Merton Park and West Barnes respectively.

Merton local election result 1998
Party	Seats	Gains	Losses	Net gain/loss	Seats %	Votes %	Votes	+/−
Labour	39	1	2	▼1	68.42	44.16	57,753	▼4.36
Conservative	12	2	0	▲2	21.06	32.89	43,021	▲2.73
Liberal Democrats	3	0	0	Steady	5.26	14.44	18,881	▲2.32
Merton Park RA	3	0	0	Steady	5.26	3.38	4,415	▼0.08
Green	0	0	0	Steady	0.00	4.82	6,301	▲2.36
BNP	0	0	0	Steady	0.00	0.17	216	New
Independent	0	0	0	Steady	0.00	0.16	205	▼0.38
Longthornton and Tamworth Residents	0	0	1	▼1	0.00	0.00	0 (Note: The party ran in the previous election but fielded no candidates in this election)	▼2.54
Total	57						130,792	

After the election the composition of the council was as follows:

↓
39	3	3	12
Labour	Lib Dem	Merton Park	Conservative

== Ward results ==
(*) - Indicates an incumbent candidate

(†) - Indicates an incumbent candidate standing in a different ward

=== Abbey ===
Abbey (3)
Party	Candidate	Votes	%	±%
Labour	Susan Assinen*	1,162	49.82	▲5.45
Labour	John K. Carter	1,138		
Labour	Mohammad A. Karim	1,101		
Conservative	Margaret A. Connon	578	23.96	▲2.62
Conservative	Andrew M.A. Leek	535		
Conservative	James D.R. Holmes^{†} (Note: Holmes was a sitting councillor representing the Hillside ward)	523		
Liberal Democrats	Elizabeth J. Barker	478	16.79	▲8.09
Liberal Democrats	Michael C. Roe	349		
Liberal Democrats	John P. Houlihan	319		
Green	Jacqueline L. Barrow	265	9.43	▼6.44
Green	Mark A. Coxon	223		
Green	Syed A.A. Naqvi	156		
Registered electors		7,317		▲373
Turnout		2,505	34.24	▼12.81
Rejected ballots		11	0.44	▲0.32
Labour hold				
Labour hold				
Labour hold				

=== Cannon Hill ===
Cannon Hill (3)
Party	Candidate	Votes	%	±%
Labour	Michael J. Mannion*	1,354	44.64	▼1.71
Labour	Brian White*	1,308		
Labour	Charles Lucas*	1,269		
Conservative	Michael A. Grundy	1,090	36.77	▲3.61
Conservative	David W. Gillmor	1,088		
Conservative	Joan Pethen	1,060		
Liberal Democrats	Peter Larkin	459	12.94	▼2.25
Liberal Democrats	Christopher A. Oxford	352		
Liberal Democrats	Mark C. Surey	329		
Green	John R. Barker	166	5.65	▲0.35
Registered electors		6,669		▲39
Turnout		3,047	45.69	▼7.81
Rejected ballots		4	0.13	▲0.05
Labour hold				
Labour hold				
Labour hold				

=== Colliers Wood ===
Colliers Wood (3)
Party	Candidate	Votes	%	±%
Labour	Sheila Knight*	1,298	49.56	▼2.60
Labour	George D. Reynolds	1,293		
Labour	Adrian P. Holt^{†} (Note: Holt was a sitting councillor representing the Abbey ward)	1,099		
Green	Thomas J. Walsh	960	28.53	▲5.35
Green	Jacqueline L. Ward	597		
Green	Lois Walters	567		
Conservative	Margaret K. Ali	324	12.87	▼1.00
Conservative	Andrea J. Graham	319		
Conservative	Kenneth M. Butt	315		
Liberal Democrats	Laura A. Kirwan	288	9.05	▼1.74
Liberal Democrats	Marek Siemaszko	161		
Registered electors		7,399		▼185
Turnout		2,723	36.80	▼8.48
Rejected ballots		16	0.59	▲0.36
Labour hold				
Labour hold				
Labour hold				

=== Dundonald ===
Dundonald (3)
Party	Candidate	Votes	%	±%
Labour	Barbara M. Bampton	1,233	45.98	▼3.62
Labour	Michael A. Brunt*	1,128		
Labour	John S. Pickover*	1,000		
Conservative	John A. Elvidge	661	25.40	▼3.00
Conservative	David T.P. Daly	609		
Conservative	Andrew W. Hall	587		
Green	David T. Bezkorowajny	446	13.28	▲3.15
Liberal Democrats	Jennifer C. Taylor	388	15.34	▲3.47
Liberal Democrats	Blaise C. Eglington	369		
Liberal Democrats	Rosamund A. Packer	364		
Green	Jennifer H. Barrow	285		
Green	Christina Langley	240		
Registered electors		6,302		▲167
Turnout		2,593	41.15	▼14.87
Rejected ballots		15	0.58	▲0.43
Labour hold				
Labour hold				
Labour hold				

=== Durnsford ===
Durnsford (2)
Party	Candidate	Votes	%	±%
Labour	Joyce G. Paton* (Note: Paton was elected in a by-election triggered by the death of Cllr. Arthur M. Kennedy in 1995)	813	44.55	▼0.48
Labour	Mark A. Thompson	805		
Conservative	Elisabeth I. Mitchell	668	35.88	▲0.24
Conservative	Tariq M. Ahmad	635		
Liberal Democrats	Sally A. Harlow	280	13.02	▼0.43
Liberal Democrats	Stephen K. Harbron	193		
Green	John a. Garrett	119	6.55	▲0.67
Registered electors		4,361		▲78
Turnout		1,890	43.34	▼11.50
Rejected ballots		13	0.69	▲0.52
Labour hold				
Labour hold				

=== Figge's March ===
Figge's Marsh (3)
Party	Candidate	Votes	%	±%
Labour	Geraldine P. Stanford*	1,396	56.17	▲0.94
Labour	Daniel F. Connellan*	1,298		
Labour	Andrew J. Judge* (Note: Judge replaced Cllr. David B. Proctor in a by-election triggered by his death in 1995)	1,285		
Conservative	Richard Aitken-Davies	596	22.19	▼7.04
Conservative	Kathleen A. Lewis	526		
Conservative	Mohammed Y. Qureshi	450		
Liberal Democrats	Malcolm T. Geldart	339	14.36	▲4.86
Green	Francis E.R. Cluer	172	7.28	▲1.24
Registered electors		7,598		▲251
Turnout		2,359	31.05	▼17.61
Rejected ballots		18	0.76	▲0.56
Labour hold				
Labour hold				
Labour hold				

=== Graveney ===
Graveney (2)
Party	Candidate	Votes	%	±%
Labour	Linda C. Kirby*	908	65.84	▲1.18
Labour	Joseph B. Abrams*	898		
Conservative	Maureen G. Jewson	240	17.10	▼3.74
Conservative	Anton I. Nadarajah	229		
Liberal Democrats	James J. McKenna	194	11.45	▲0.73
Liberal Democrats	Marc J-Y. Plessier	120		
Green	Emma-Ruth Crowhurst	77	5.61	▲1.82
Registered electors		4,356		▲111
Turnout		1,468	33.70	▼16.22
Rejected ballots		9	0.61	▲0.19
Labour hold				
Labour hold				

=== Hillside ===
Hillside (3)
Party	Candidate	Votes	%	±%
Conservative	Richard J. Harwood	1,254	46.60	▲0.89
Conservative	David T. Williams*	1,222		
Conservative	Christopher S. Grayling	1,194		
Labour	Christine M. Bickerstaff	804	27.12	▼1.51
Labour	Brian A. Luff	683		
Labour	Laurence G. North	649		
Liberal Democrats	Carmel A. Fowler	521	17.48	▼0.75
Liberal Democrats	Joan W. Pyke-Lees	479		
Liberal Democrats	Kamaljit S. Sood	377		
Green	Margaret A. Garrett	231	8.80	▲1.37
Registered electors		7,202		▲519
Turnout		2,655	36.86	▼7.07
Rejected ballots		27	1.02	▲0.85
Conservative hold				
Conservative hold				
Conservative hold				

=== Lavender ===
Lavender (2)
Party	Candidate	Votes	%	±%
Labour	Edith J.C. Macauley	971	57.99	▼10.89
Labour	Malcolm R. Searle*	862		
Conservative	John E. Jewson	302	17.91	▼0.92
Conservative	Michael G. Miles^{†} (Note: Miles was a sitting councillor representing the Raynes Park ward)	264		
Liberal Democrats	Bernard W. Conway	242	15.31	▲3.02
Green	Sarah J. Miskin	139	8.79	New
Registered electors		5,450		▲383
Turnout		1,569	28.79	▼17.11
Rejected ballots		10	0.64	▲0.34
Labour hold				
Labour hold				

=== Longthornton ===
Longthornton (3)
Party	Candidate	Votes	%	±%
Labour	John D. Cairns	1,371	53.42	▲14.18
Labour	Abdus S. Chaudhry	1,314		
Labour	Karen F. Livingstone	1,279		
Conservative	David P. Jeffreys	910	34.27	▲19.84
Conservative	Geraldine V.M. Kirby	843		
Conservative	Ramdehol Dookhie	790		
Liberal Democrats	Tariq Ahmad	318	12.30	▲5.74
Liberal Democrats	Dean R. Juster	298		
Liberal Democrats	Heather M. Hurst	297		
Registered electors		7,320		▲68
Turnout		2,737	37.39	▼13.75
Rejected ballots		15	0.55	▲0.42
Labour hold				
Labour gain from Longthornton and Tamworth Residents				
Labour hold				

=== Lower Morden ===
Lower Morden (3)
Party	Candidate	Votes	%	±%
Conservative	Terence J. Daniels	1,424	48.26	▲10.82
Conservative	Janet Jones*	1,397		
Conservative	Peter J. Morss	1,310		
Labour	Cyril I. Gallant*	1,051	35.47	▼3.66
Labour	Nicholas G. Draper*	1,012		
Labour	Anna M. Monks	973		
Liberal Democrats	Patricia E. Pearce	357	11.47	▼3.70
Liberal Democrats	David M. Holloway	357		
Liberal Democrats	Graham L. Stacey	268		
Green	Stephen C. Boulding	137	4.80	▼3.46
Registered electors		6,712		▲50
Turnout		3,020	44.99	▼4.78
Rejected ballots		7	0.23	▲0.17
Conservative gain from Labour				
Conservative gain from Labour				
Conservative hold				

=== Merton Park ===
Merton Park (3)
Party	Candidate	Votes	%	±%
Merton Park RA	Desmonde E.T. Child*	1,506	50.07	▼7.35
Merton Park RA	Bridget G. Smith*	1,496		
Merton Park RA	John A. Nelson-Jones	1,413		
Conservative	Mark S. Coote	811	26.37	▲7.46
Conservative	Ronald Cox	775		
Conservative	Gavin J. Muncey	739		
Labour	Michael A. Fitzgerald	531	16.69	▼2.33
Labour	Aejaz A. Khan-Zada	473		
Labour	Roger A. Stephens	468		
Liberal Democrats	John A. O'Boyle	202	6.87	▲2.22
Registered electors		6,819		▲341
Turnout		2,929	42.95	▼9.89
Rejected ballots		8	0.27	▲0.15
Merton Park RA hold				
Merton Park RA hold				
Merton Park RA hold				

=== Phipps Bridge ===
Phipps Bridge (3)
Party	Candidate	Votes	%	±%
Labour	Thomas I. Munn*	1,386	53.14	▼6.47
Labour	Paul Harper*	1,362		
Labour	Judith C. Saunders*	1,176		
Conservative	Sally Lundie	598	23.06	▲2.22
Conservative	Barbara J. Mansfield	584		
Conservative	Roger A. Farrance^{†} (Note: Farrance was a sitting councillor representing the Village ward)	521		
Liberal Democrats	Nicholas Pizey	328	13.32	▲3.65
Green	Robin Bannister	258	10.48	New
Registered electors		7,682		▼49
Turnout		2,433	31.67	▼12.99
Rejected ballots		15	0.62	▲0.48
Labour hold				
Labour hold				
Labour hold				

=== Pollards Hill ===
Pollards Hill (3)
Party	Candidate	Votes	%	±%
Labour	John H. Cole*	1,248	59.54	▼1.01
Labour	Russell J. Makin	1,065		
Labour	Mohammad A. Syed	1,026		
Conservative	Pauline Blythe	552	22.95	▼0.20
Conservative	Jason R. Garbutt^{†} (Note: Garbutt was a sitting councillor representing the Hillside ward)	418		
Conservative	Harris Y. Chong	317		
Liberal Democrats	Nicholas R.G. Wren	204	10.56	▼5.74
Liberal Democrats	Paul M. Whitehead	191		
Green	Keith R. O'Neill	130	6.95	New
Registered electors		6,074		▼129
Turnout		2,047	33.70	▼15.16
Rejected ballots		12	0.59	▲0.29
Labour hold				
Labour hold				
Labour hold				

=== Ravensbury ===
Ravensbury (3)
Party	Candidate	Votes	%	±%
Labour	Philip M. Jones*	1,294	49.29	▼10.75
Labour	Peter J. Smith*	1,229		
Labour	Peter J. McCabe*	1,215		
Conservative	Thelma T. Earnshaw	560	20.40	▲3.01
Conservative	Roderick W. McLeod	508		
Conservative	Cyril J. Mitchell	479		
Liberal Democrats	Violet Jennings	330	13.06	▲1.30
Independent	Terence J. Sullivan	205	8.11	▲5.48
Green	Nicholas F.G. Miskin	143	5.66	▼0.63
BNP	Ian B. Dell	88	3.48	New
Registered electors		6,517		▼19
Turnout		2,360	36.21	▼12.55
Rejected ballots		8	0.34	▲0.15
Labour hold				
Labour hold				
Labour hold				

=== Raynes Park ===
Raynes Park (3)
Party	Candidate	Votes	%	±%
Conservative	Margaret A. Brierly*	1,375	42.92	▼0.21
Conservative	Robert S.K. Bell*	1,310		
Conservative	Neville E. Beddoe^{†} (Note: Beddoe was a sitting councillor representing the Merton Park ward for the Merton Park Residents Association before at some point defecting to Labour)	1,272		
Liberal Democrats	David P. Hurst	965	30.40	▲10.73
Liberal Democrats	Gail Moss	922		
Liberal Democrats	Louise N. Pugh	915		
Labour	Shoshana Foster	725	21.34	▼8.74
Labour	Anne E. Taulbut	662		
Labour	Haribhai C. Patel	580		
Green	Brian Parkin	164	5.34	▼1.77
Registered electors		7,207		▲77
Turnout		3,130	43.43	▼2.91
Rejected ballots		10	0.32	▲0.14
Conservative hold				
Conservative hold				
Conservative hold				

=== St. Helier ===
St. Helier (3)
Party	Candidate	Votes	%	±%
Labour	Dennis Pearce	1,178	45.42	▼15.93
Labour	Eunice M. Martin	1,083		
Labour	Michael A. Spacey*	1,025		
Conservative	Keith W.A. Guy	696	25.26	▲2.34
Conservative	Gordon H. Raymond	566		
Conservative	Anne M. Williams	565		
Liberal Democrats	Caroline A. Plessier	346	14.35	▲4.19
Green	Susan Boulding	233	9.66	▼4.09
BNP	Robert Andrews	128	5.31	New
Registered electors		6,351		▼30
Turnout		2,259	35.57	▼14.61
Rejected ballots		7	0.31	▲0.25
Labour hold				
Labour hold				
Labour hold				

=== Trinity ===
Trinity (3)
Party	Candidate	Votes	%	±%
Labour	Vivien R. Guy	1,082	44.66	▲0.93
Labour	Kingsley J. Abrams*	1,061		
Labour	Paul Barasi*	981		
Conservative	Dorothy R.Kilsby	696	29.19	▲0.59
Conservative	Nicholas E. Brewer	689		
Conservative	Alan R. Hogg	657		
Liberal Democrats	Peter J. Hutchison	411	16.28	▼0.43
Liberal Democrats	Neil R. Rennie	368		
Liberal Democrats	Bonita Ralph	360		
Green	Stephen P. Gardiner	230	9.87	▲3.10
Registered electors		6,249		▲561
Turnout		2,361	37.78	▲19.16
Rejected ballots		7	0.30	▲0.21
Labour hold				
Labour hold				
Labour hold				

=== Village ===
Village (3)
Party	Candidate	Votes	%	±%
Conservative	Allan H. Jones*	1,337	57.25	▲0.59
Conservative	Samantha L. George	1,330		
Conservative	Christopher G. Housden	1,328		
Labour	Martin M.D. Holman	534	21.42	▲3.85
Labour	Denise M. Leggett	494		
Labour	Kenneth J. Wilshire	467		
Liberal Democrats	Philip C. Rumney	317	13.11	▼6.34
Liberal Democrats	Anthony A.W. Dix	300		
Liberal Democrats	Richard K. Tibbetts	298		
Green	Ernest D. Dennis	191	8.21	▲1.89
Registered electors		6,058		▲129
Turnout		2,325	38.38	▼6.53
Rejected ballots		12	0.52	▲0.48
Conservative hold				
Conservative hold				
Conservative hold				

=== West Barnes ===
West Barnes (3)
Party	Candidate	Votes	%	±%
Liberal Democrats	Jennifer N. Willott	1,360	41.74	▲7.98
Liberal Democrats	Iain D. StC. Dysart*	1,317		
Liberal Democrats	Nicholas P. Harris*	1,251		
Labour	Barry L.T. Edwards	916	28.19	▲0.96
Labour	Stephen K. Nixon	882		
Labour	Patrick J. Loughran	855		
Conservative	Linda Batchelor	816	25.45	▼1.15
Conservative	David Jessop	799		
Conservative	Roderick F. Scott	780		
Green	Julian Davidson	145	4.62	▼0.53
Registered electors		7,013		▲37
Turnout		3,223	45.96	▼8.57
Rejected ballots		15	0.47	▲0.36
Liberal Democrats hold				
Liberal Democrats hold				
Liberal Democrats hold				
