= 2022 Merton London Borough Council election =

2022 local election in Merton

- 5 May 2022

All 57 council seats on Merton London Borough Council

	First party	Second party
Leader	Mark Allison	Anthony Fairclough
Party	Labour	Liberal Democrats
Leader's seat	Wandle (defeated)	Wimbledon Town & Dundonald
Last election	34 seats, 46.9%	6 seats, 14.6%
Seats won	31	17
Seat change	▼3	▲11
Popular vote	70,423	41,655
Percentage	42.3%	25.0%
Swing	▼4.6%	▲10.4%
	Third party	Fourth party
Leader	Nick McLean	Edward Foley
Party	Conservative	Merton Park RA
Leader's seat	Cannon Hill	Merton Park
Last election	17 seats, 31.5%	3 seats, 3.3%
Seats won	7	2
Seat change	▼10	▼1
Popular vote	43,382	3,576
Percentage	26.1%	2.1%
Swing	▼5.4%	▼1.2%
- Map of the results of the 2022 Merton council election. Conservatives in blue, Labour in red, Liberal Democrats in yellow and Merton Park Ward Residents Association in white.
Council leader before election
Mark Allison
Labour
Council leader after
election
Ross Garrod
Labour

Elections for the London Borough of Merton were held on 5 May 2022 to elect all 57 members of Merton London Borough Council in England. The elections took place alongside local elections in the other London boroughs and elections to local authorities across the United Kingdom.

The 2022 election took place under new election boundaries, which reduced the number of councillors from 60 to 57. Labour remained the largest party following the election, winning 31 seats. For the first time in the council's history, the Liberal Democrats became the largest opposition party, winning 17 seats. The Conservatives, previously the largest opposition party, won seven seats.

== Background ==
Since its formation, Merton has variously been under Labour control, Conservative control and no overall control. In the previous council election in 2018, Labour and the Conservatives lost seats to the Liberal Democrats. Labour won 34 seats with 46.9% of the vote across the borough, while the Conservatives won 17 seats with 31.5% of the vote. The Liberal Democrats rose to six seats with 14.6% of the vote and the Merton Park Ward Independent Residents continued to hold three seats with 3.3% of the vote across the borough.

=== Council term ===
In May 2019, Mark Kenny, a Labour councillor for Cannon Hill, resigned citing health reasons. A by-election to fill the seat was held in June 2019, which was won by the Liberal Democrat candidate Jenifer Gould. One of the Liberal Democrat councillors for West Barnes, Carl Quilliam who had previously lost the contest to become the Liberal Democrat Parliamentary Candidate for Wimbledon in 2019, defected to the Labour Party in June 2020 citing the national leadership of Keir Starmer. In March 2021, Kelly Braund, a Labour councillor for St Helier, resigned because she was moving to Scotland. At the subsequent by-election, the seat was held for Labour by Helen Dollimore.

The Labour councillor Mark Allison succeeded Stephen Alambritis as leader of the council in November 2020.

Along with most other London boroughs, Merton was subject to a boundary review ahead of the 2022 election. The Local Government Boundary Commission for England concluded that the council should have 57 seats, falling from the previous 60 seats, and produced new election boundaries following a period of consultation.

== Electoral process ==
Merton, like other London borough councils, elects all of its councillors at once every four years. The election took place by multi-member first-past-the-post voting, with each ward being represented by two or three councillors. Electors had as many votes as there are councillors to be elected in their ward, with the top two or three being elected.

All registered electors (British, Irish, Commonwealth and European Union citizens) living in London aged 18 or over were entitled to vote in the election. People who lived at two addresses in different councils, such as university students with different term-time and holiday addresses, were entitled to be registered for and vote in elections in both local authorities. Voting in-person at polling stations took place from 7:00 to 22:00 on election day, and voters were able to apply for postal votes or proxy votes in advance of the election.

== Results ==
2022 Merton London Borough Council election
Party	Seats	Gains	Losses	Net gain/loss	Seats %	Votes %	Votes	+/−
Labour	31			▼3	54.4	42.3	70,423	-4.6
Liberal Democrats	17			▲11	29.8	25.0	41,655	+10.4
Conservative	7			▼10	12.3	26.1	43,382	-5.4
Merton Park RA	2			▼1	3.5	2.1	3,576	-1.2
Green	0	0	0	Steady	0.0	4.3	7,161	+1.5
TUSC	0	0	0	Steady	0.0	0.1	154	+0.1

Due to the boundary changes, which reduced the number of seats from 60 to 57, reporting the gains/losses by party is not straightforward. The BBC used a calculation which takes into account the changes relative to the expected previous result under the new boundaries. These give: Labour -4, Liberal Democrats +12, Conservatives -8, Merton Park Independents: no change.

=== Council composition ===
Council composition after the 2018 election and before the 2022 election

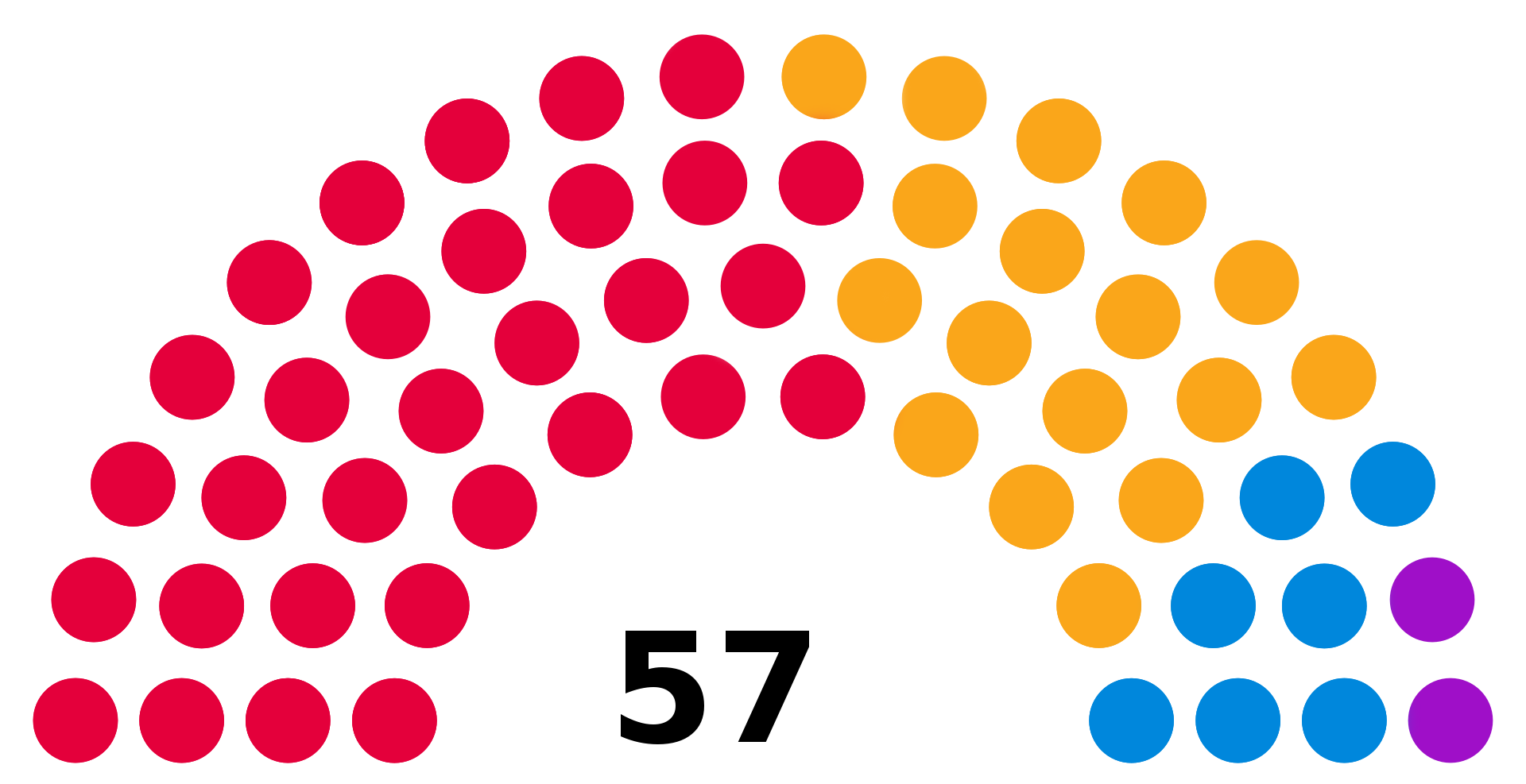
Council composition after the 2022 election

After 2018 election		Before 2022 election		After 2022 election	
Party	Seats	Party	Seats	Party	Seats
Labour	34	Labour	34	Labour	31
Conservative	17	Conservative	17	Liberal Democrats	17
Liberal Democrats	6	Liberal Democrats	6	Conservative	7
Merton Park RA	3	Merton Park RA	3	Merton Park RA	2

== Ward results ==
=== Abbey ===
Abbey (3)
Party	Candidate	Votes	%	±%
Liberal Democrats	John Braithwaite	1,294	37.6	N/A
Labour	Mike Brunt	1,169	34.0	N/A
Liberal Democrats	Klaar Dresselaers	1,160	33.7	N/A
Liberal Democrats	Barry Smith	1,151	33.5	N/A
Labour	Karen Peck	1,133	32.9	N/A
Labour	Zak Dada	1,089	31.7	N/A
Conservative	Nigel Benbow*	927	27.0	N/A
Conservative	Hayley Ormrod*	858	24.9	N/A
Conservative	Sivas Ranjan	796	23.1	N/A
Green	Peter Garrett	391	11.4	N/A
Turnout		3,439	46.5	
Liberal Democrats gain from Labour				
Labour hold				
Liberal Democrats gain from Conservative				

=== Cannon Hill ===
Cannon Hill (3)
Party	Candidate	Votes	%	±%
Liberal Democrats	Jenifer Gould*	1,329	36.7	N/A
Conservative	Nicholas McLean*	1,263	34.9	N/A
Conservative	Michael Paterson	1,193	32.9	N/A
Liberal Democrats	Asif Ashraf	1,168	32.3	N/A
Conservative	Frank Pocock	1,140	31.5	N/A
Liberal Democrats	Richard Poole	1,129	31.2	N/A
Labour	Dave Barnes	1,049	29.0	N/A
Labour	Pauline Cowper	984	27.2	N/A
Labour	Ryan Barnett	977	27.0	N/A
Green	Jae Henderson	299	8.3	N/A
Turnout		3,621	49.9	
Liberal Democrats gain from Labour				
Conservative hold				
Conservative gain from Labour				

=== Colliers Wood ===
Colliers Wood (3)
Party	Candidate	Votes	%	±%
Labour	Caroline Cooper-Marbiah*	1,907	61.9	N/A
Labour	Laxmi Attawar*	1,809	58.7	N/A
Labour	Stuart Neaverson	1,563	50.7	N/A
Green	Philip Geraghty	855	27.7	N/A
Green	Thomas Walsh	696	22.6	N/A
Conservative	Harry Todd	400	13.0	N/A
Conservative	Dylan White	369	12.0	N/A
Conservative	Katarzyna Markham	359	11.6	N/A
Liberal Democrats	Emily Robertson	276	9.0	N/A
Liberal Democrats	Shipra Gupta	265	8.6	N/A
Liberal Democrats	John Kenny	230	7.5	N/A
Turnout		3,083	37.2	
Labour hold				
Labour hold				
Labour hold				

=== Cricket Green ===
Cricket Green (3)
Party	Candidate	Votes	%	±%
Labour	Gill Manly	1,816	70.7	N/A
Labour	Michael Butcher	1,788	69.6	N/A
Labour	Usaama Kaweesa	1,774	69.0	N/A
Conservative	Barbara Mansfield	433	16.8	N/A
Conservative	Gary Watkinson	351	13.7	N/A
Conservative	Peter Ludvigsen	348	13.5	N/A
Green	Christopher Stanton	274	10.7	N/A
Liberal Democrats	Vincent Bolt	196	7.6	N/A
Liberal Democrats	Gail Morrison	182	7.1	N/A
Liberal Democrats	William Woodward	121	4.7	N/A
TUSC	Alex Forbes	80	3.1	N/A
Turnout		2,570	31.7	
Labour hold				
Labour hold				
Labour hold				

=== Figge's Marsh ===
Figge's Marsh (3)
Party	Candidate	Votes	%	±%
Labour	Agatha Akyigyina*	1,962	78.6	N/A
Labour	Natasha Irons*	1,882	75.4	N/A
Labour	Daniel Johnston	1,753	70.2	N/A
Conservative	Linda Taylor	293	11.7	N/A
Conservative	Alice Hammond	267	10.7	N/A
Conservative	Tim Williamson	257	10.3	N/A
Green	Sally Pannifex	221	8.9	N/A
Liberal Democrats	Eloise Bailey*	152	6.1	N/A
Liberal Democrats	John Raymond	115	4.6	N/A
Liberal Democrats	Nicholas Thomas	103	4.1	N/A
TUSC	April Ashley	84	3.4	N/A
Turnout		2,496	32.9	
Labour hold				
Labour hold				
Labour hold				

=== Graveney ===
Graveney (3)
Party	Candidate	Votes	%	±%
Labour	Linda Kirby*	2,182	75.4	N/A
Labour	Sheri Ann Bhim	2,097	72.5	N/A
Labour	Billy Hayes	2,009	69.5	N/A
Green	Rupert Stevens	422	14.6	N/A
Conservative	Louis Altman	385	13.3	N/A
Conservative	Sally Hammond	363	12.6	N/A
Conservative	Ricky Osei	323	11.2	N/A
Liberal Democrats	Christine Peace	199	6.9	N/A
Liberal Democrats	Yue Hang Ho	166	5.7	N/A
Liberal Democrats	Quresh Mukadam	142	4.9	N/A
Turnout		2,892	35.2	
Labour hold				
Labour hold				
Labour hold				

=== Hillside ===
Hillside (2)
Party	Candidate	Votes	%	±%
Liberal Democrats	Susan Hicks	1,105	42.4	N/A
Conservative	Dan Holden*	1,059	40.6	N/A
Conservative	Rob Cossins	1,015	38.9	N/A
Liberal Democrats	Ursula Faulkner	1,005	38.5	N/A
Labour	Rebecca Bottriell	515	19.7	N/A
Labour	Steven Hirsch	464	17.8	N/A
Turnout		2,608	43.4	
Liberal Democrats gain from Conservative				
Conservative hold				

=== Lavender Fields ===
Lavender Fields (3)
Party	Candidate	Votes	%	±%
Labour	Edith Macauley*	1,608	67.8	N/A
Labour	Billy Christie*	1,580	66.6	N/A
Labour	Slawek Szczepanski	1,390	58.6	N/A
Conservative	Rathy Alagaratnam	420	17.7	N/A
Conservative	Angela Cahill	395	16.7	N/A
Green	George Burridge	365	15.4	N/A
Conservative	Fred Rushton	322	13.6	N/A
Liberal Democrats	Elizabeth Barker	271	11.4	N/A
Liberal Democrats	Simon Parritt	166	7.0	N/A
Liberal Democrats	Benedict Fletcher	117	4.9	N/A
Turnout		2,371	29.6	
Labour hold				
Labour hold				
Labour hold				

=== Longthornton ===
Longthornton (3)
Party	Candidate	Votes	%	±%
Labour	Brenda Fraser*	1,869	72.2	N/A
Labour	Ross Garrod	1,662	64.2	N/A
Labour	Marsie Skeete*	1,584	61.2	N/A
Conservative	Brian Lewis-Lavender	453	17.5	N/A
Conservative	Delvalee Willie	425	16.4	N/A
Conservative	Michael Ormrod	417	16.1	N/A
Green	Leila Boyd	332	12.8	N/A
Liberal Democrats	Simon Jones	217	8.4	N/A
Liberal Democrats	Nicholas Harris	198	7.6	N/A
Liberal Democrats	Kaweh Beheshtizadeh	191	7.4	N/A
Turnout		2,590	32.1	
Labour hold				
Labour hold				
Labour hold				

=== Lower Morden ===
Lower Morden (3)
Party	Candidate	Votes	%	±%
Labour	Sally Kenny*	1,778	49.1	N/A
Labour	James Williscroft	1,599	44.1	N/A
Conservative	Eleanor Cox	1,536	42.4	N/A
Labour	Miran Hassan	1,531	42.3	N/A
Conservative	Andrew Cunningham	1,490	41.1	N/A
Conservative	James Bogle	1,469	40.5	N/A
Green	Martin Astrand	384	10.6	N/A
Liberal Democrats	Gabriel Luck	271	7.5	N/A
Liberal Democrats	Nicholas Miles	216	6.0	N/A
Liberal Democrats	Jean-Bernard Tanqueray	187	5.2	N/A
Turnout		3,623	43.1	
Labour hold				
Labour hold				
Conservative gain from Labour				

=== Merton Park ===
Merton Park (2)
Party	Candidate	Votes	%	±%
Merton Park RA	Edward Foley*	1,853	61.1	N/A
Merton Park RA	Stephen Mercer	1,723	56.8	N/A
Labour	Deborah Chadwick	575	19.0	N/A
Labour	Alex Harris	498	16.4	N/A
Conservative	Abdul Latif	346	11.4	N/A
Conservative	Najeeb Latif*	333	11.0	N/A
Liberal Democrats	Emma Maddison	293	9.7	N/A
Liberal Democrats	Christopher Oxford	177	5.8	N/A
Green	Keiren O'Brien	173	5.7	N/A
Turnout		3,031	50.2	
Merton Park RA hold				
Merton Park RA hold				

=== Pollards Hill ===
Pollards Hill (3)
Party	Candidate	Votes	%	±%
Labour	Joan Henry*	1,930	78.1	N/A
Labour	Martin Whelton*	1,786	72.2	N/A
Labour	Aidan Mundy*	1,785	72.2	N/A
Conservative	Daniel Amona	366	14.8	N/A
Conservative	Anthony Cole	351	14.2	N/A
Conservative	Beth Mitchell	343	13.9	N/A
Green	Margaret Rogers	174	7.0	N/A
Liberal Democrats	Toni Borrow	125	5.1	N/A
Liberal Democrats	Mary-Jane Jeanes	122	4.9	N/A
Liberal Democrats	Matthew Payne	89	3.6	N/A
Turnout		2,472	30.4	
Labour hold				
Labour hold				
Labour hold				

=== Ravensbury ===
Ravensbury (3)
Party	Candidate	Votes	%	±%
Labour	Caroline Charles	1,504	68.4	N/A
Labour	Stephen Alambritis*	1,497	68.1	N/A
Labour	Peter McCabe*	1,346	61.2	N/A
Conservative	Sarah Holmes	385	17.5	N/A
Conservative	Rory Holdt	355	16.1	N/A
Conservative	Thomas Moulton	337	15.3	N/A
Green	Karen Ohara	294	13.4	N/A
Liberal Democrats	Sarah Weber	192	8.7	N/A
Liberal Democrats	Stephen Harbron	173	7.9	N/A
Liberal Democrats	Hamish Norbrook	153	7.0	N/A
Turnout		2,199	32.8	
Labour hold				
Labour hold				
Labour hold				

=== Raynes Park ===
Raynes Park (3)
Party	Candidate	Votes	%	±%
Liberal Democrats	Victoria Wilson	1,819	44.9	N/A
Liberal Democrats	Chessie Flack	1,796	44.3	N/A
Liberal Democrats	Matthew Willis	1,753	43.2	N/A
Conservative	David Dean*	1,287	31.7	N/A
Conservative	Adam Bush*	1,264	31.2	N/A
Conservative	Omar Bush*	1,223	30.2	N/A
Labour	Becky Hooper	767	18.9	N/A
Labour	Wayne Busbridge	707	17.4	N/A
Labour	Harry Platts	662	16.3	N/A
Green	Peter Gay	421	10.4	N/A
Turnout		4,054	46.9	
Liberal Democrats gain from Conservative				
Liberal Democrats gain from Conservative				
Liberal Democrats gain from Conservative				

=== St Helier ===
St Helier (3)
Party	Candidate	Votes	%	±%
Labour	Helena Dollimore*	1,393	60.8	N/A
Labour	Andrew Judge	1,262	55.1	N/A
Labour	Dennis Pearce*	1,258	54.9	N/A
Conservative	Olivia Barlow	475	20.7	N/A
Conservative	Stephen Crowe*	415	18.1	N/A
Green	Pippa Maslin	386	16.8	N/A
Conservative	Inam Bokth	380	16.6	N/A
Green	Rachel Brooks	340	14.8	N/A
Green	James Rae	227	9.9	N/A
Liberal Democrats	Vivian Vella	151	6.6	N/A
Liberal Democrats	Richard Shillito	149	6.5	N/A
Liberal Democrats	Guy Weston	117	5.1	N/A
Turnout		2,291	30.3	
Labour hold				
Labour hold				
Labour hold				

=== Village ===
Village (3)
Party	Candidate	Votes	%	±%
Conservative	Thomas Barlow*	1,931	50.6	N/A
Conservative	Max Austin	1,909	50.0	N/A
Conservative	Andrew Howard*	1,850	48.5	N/A
Liberal Democrats	Fergus Kirman	1,254	32.9	N/A
Liberal Democrats	Alexander Gallagher	1,223	32.1	N/A
Liberal Democrats	Tom Williams	1,166	30.6	N/A
Labour	Shirley Pritchard	495	13.0	N/A
Labour	Franca Ofeimu	465	12.2	N/A
Labour	Geoffrey Thomas	445	11.7	N/A
Green	Sonja Timpson	433	11.3	N/A
Turnout		3,815	44.6	
Conservative hold				
Conservative hold				
Conservative hold				

=== Wandle ===
Wandle (2)
Party	Candidate	Votes	%	±%
Liberal Democrats	Kirsten Galea	755	34.5	N/A
Labour	Eleanor Stringer*	740	33.8	N/A
Labour	Mark Allison*	727	33.2	N/A
Liberal Democrats	Philip Ling	673	30.7	N/A
Conservative	Guy Lockwood	513	23.4	N/A
Conservative	Calum McGrath	472	21.6	N/A
Green	Mehmood Naqshbandi	253	11.6	N/A
Green	Benjamin Smith	166	7.6	N/A
Turnout		2,189	46.6	
Liberal Democrats win (new seat)				
Labour win (new seat)				

=== West Barnes ===
West Barnes (3)
Party	Candidate	Votes	%	±%
Liberal Democrats	Hina Bokhari*	1,655	46.2	N/A
Liberal Democrats	John Oliver	1,612	45.0	N/A
Liberal Democrats	Robert Page	1,348	37.7	N/A
Conservative	Gilli Lewis-Lavender	1,114	31.1	N/A
Conservative	Lily Alimi	1,038	29.0	N/A
Conservative	Joseph Hackett	1,034	28.9	N/A
Labour	Tessa Tyler Todd	711	19.9	N/A
Labour	Rob Newbery	701	19.6	N/A
Labour	Ben Butler*	691	19.3	N/A
Green	John Barraball	441	12.3	N/A
Turnout		3,580	47.3	
Liberal Democrats hold				
Liberal Democrats hold				
Liberal Democrats hold				

=== Wimbledon Park ===
Wimbledon Park (3)
Party	Candidate	Votes	%	±%
Liberal Democrats	Jil Hall	1,451	42.1	N/A
Liberal Democrats	Samantha MacArthur	1,377	39.9	N/A
Liberal Democrats	Tony Reiss	1,358	39.4	N/A
Conservative	Ed Gretton*	1,056	30.6	N/A
Conservative	Oonagh Moulton*	1,053	30.5	N/A
Conservative	Janice Howard*	988	28.6	N/A
Labour	Hugh Constant	783	22.7	N/A
Labour	Pam Treanor	711	20.6	N/A
Labour	Motiur Rahman	621	18.0	N/A
Green	Juliet Boyd	593	17.2	N/A
Turnout		3,449	44.6	
Liberal Democrats gain from Conservative				
Liberal Democrats gain from Conservative				
Liberal Democrats gain from Conservative				

=== Wimbledon Town & Dundonald ===
Wimbledon Town & Dundonald (3)
Party	Candidate	Votes	%	±%
Liberal Democrats	Paul Kohler*	2,637	58.8	N/A
Liberal Democrats	Anthony Fairclough*	2,463	54.9	N/A
Liberal Democrats	Simon McGrath*	2,252	50.2	N/A
Conservative	Suzanne Grocott	1,144	25.5	N/A
Conservative	James Holmes*	1,053	23.5	N/A
Conservative	Michael Bull	1,041	23.2	N/A
Labour	Abigail Jones	704	15.7	N/A
Labour	Terry Daniels	583	13.0	N/A
Green	Laura Collins	572	12.8	N/A
Labour	Devina Paul	553	12.3	N/A
Turnout		4,485	51.0	
Liberal Democrats win (new seat)				
Liberal Democrats win (new seat)				
Liberal Democrats win (new seat)				

== Changes 2022-2026 ==
=== By-elections ===
==== Figge's Marsh ====
Figge's Marsh by-election: 4 July 2024
Party	Candidate	Votes	%	±%
Labour	Franca Ofeimu	2,529	66.1	–6.2
Green	Sally Pannifex	515	13.5	+5.4
Conservative	Suzanne Grocott	509	13.3	+2.5
Liberal Democrats	William Woodward	272	7.1	+1.5
Majority		2,014	52.6	N/A
Turnout		3,825		
Labour hold		Swing	▼5.8	

==== St Helier ====
St Helier by-election: 4 July 2024
Party	Candidate	Votes	%	±%
Labour	Shuile Syeda	1,865	47.9	–10.0
Green	Pippa Maslin	872	22.4	+6.4
Conservative	Gillian Lewis-Lavender	687	17.6	–2.2
Liberal Democrats	Asif Ashraf	471	12.1	+5.8
Majority		993	25.5	N/A
Turnout		3,895		
Labour hold		Swing	▼8.2	
