= Wandle (Merton ward) =

Electoral ward in London, England

- Electoral ward for the Merton London Borough Council
- Borough: Merton
- County: Greater London
- Population: 5,603 (2021)
- Major settlements: Wandle Park, Merton
- Area: 0.7586 km²

Current electoral ward
- Created: 2022
- Councillors: 2

Wandle is an electoral ward in the London Borough of Merton. The ward was first used in the 2022 elections and elects two councillors to Merton London Borough Council.

== Geography ==
The ward is named after the Wandle Park area.

== Councillors ==
Election	Councillors	
2022	Kirsten Galea (Liberal Democrat)	Eleanor Stringer (Labour)
2026	Sebastian Budner (Labour)	Eleanor Stringer (Labour)

== Elections ==
=== 2026 ===
Wandle (2)
Party	Candidate	Votes	%	±%
Labour	Eleanor Stringer*	1,155	40.9	+7.1
Labour	Sebastian Budner	1,076	38.1	N/A
Liberal Democrats	Kirsten Galea*	986	34.9	+0.4
Liberal Democrats	Philip Ling	864	30.6	−0.1
Green	Gideon Noah Tarry	438	15.5	N/A
Reform	Richard Albert Dalton	238	8.4	N/A
Reform	Jeremy Singer	218	7.7	N/A
Conservative	Thomas Clive McCall	192	6.8	N/A
Conservative	Oonagh Jane Moulton	185	6.6	N/A
Turnout		2,822	51.4	+4.8
Labour hold				
Labour gain from Liberal Democrats				

=== 2022 ===
Wandle (2)
Party	Candidate	Votes	%	±%
Liberal Democrats	Kirsten Galea	755	34.5	N/A
Labour	Eleanor Stringer*	740	33.8	N/A
Labour	Mark Allison*	727	33.2	N/A
Liberal Democrats	Philip Ling	673	30.7	N/A
Conservative	Guy Lockwood	513	23.4	N/A
Conservative	Calum McGrath	472	21.6	N/A
Green	Mehmood Naqshbandi	253	11.6	N/A
Green	Benjamin Smith	166	7.6	N/A
Turnout		2,189	46.6	
Liberal Democrats win (new seat)				
Labour win (new seat)				

== See also ==
- List of electoral wards in Greater London
