= Paul Kohler (politician) =

British politician and academic (born 15 March 1959)

Paul Kohler MP
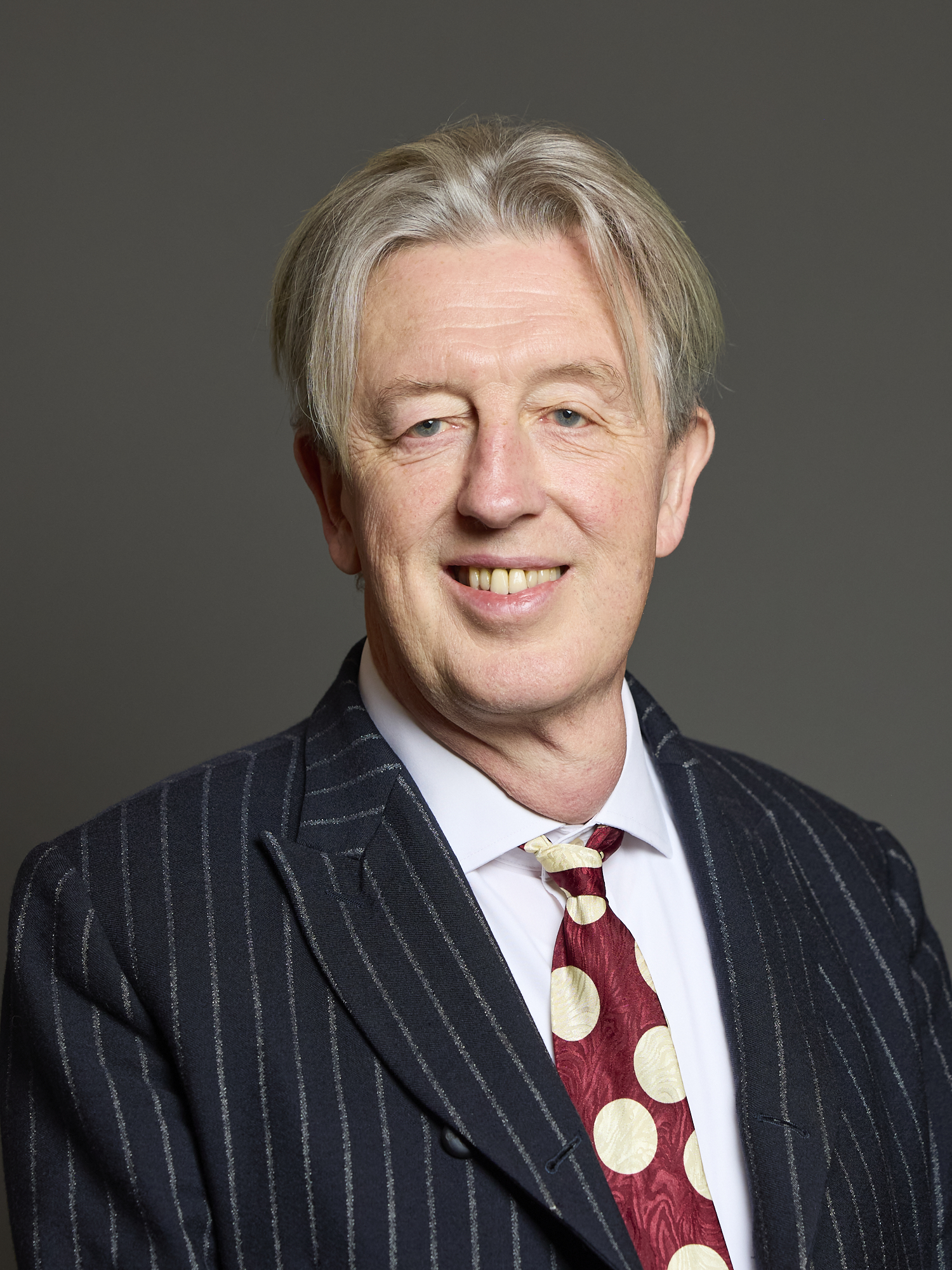
- Official portrait, 2024

Member of Parliament for Wimbledon
- Incumbent
- Assumed office 4 July 2024
- Preceded by: Stephen Hammond
- Majority: 12,610 (22.9%)

Liberal Democrat portfolios
- 2024–2025: Transport
- 2025–present: Northern Ireland

Personal details
- Born: Paul Christopher Kohler; 15 March 1959 (age 67) Epsom, Surrey, England
- Party: Liberal Democrats
- Education: Jesus College, Cambridge

Paul Christopher Kohler (born 15 March 1959) is a British politician and academic serving as the Liberal Democrat Member of Parliament for Wimbledon since 2024. Prior to his election, he was a scholar of property law who served as head of SOAS University of London School of Law.

== Early life and education ==
Kohler was the first person in his extended family to go to university. However, he dropped out from his maths degree, because of touring commitments in the Gotham City Swing Band, a new wave outfit. He subsequently returned to university and graduated in 1986 from Jesus College, Cambridge, with a Bachelor of Arts (BA) degree in law. During his time at the University of Cambridge, he was president of the college May Ball committee, where he appointed fellow Jesus undergraduate Prince Edward as a member of his team. He was also elected Junior Common Room president.

== Career ==
In the 1990s and 2000s, Kohler taught at University College London (UCL) and New College, Oxford. He was also Head of Best Practice at Nabarro Nathanson. Until 2019 before standing for Parliament, Kohler was a senior lecturer and former undergraduate tutor at SOAS University of London, where he served as head of the SOAS School of Law. He is also a Visiting Fellow at Queen Mary University of London and owner of Covent Garden speakeasy CellarDoor, which he converted from a disused underground Gentlemen's public lavatory in 2006. He was also a Fellow at Moscow's Russian State University of Justice but resigned in the wake of Vladimir Putin's 2022 invasion of Ukraine.

Kohler first represented the Liberal Democrats in the 2018 local elections, being elected as a councillor in the Trinity ward of Merton London Borough Council. A year later, he was selected as the party's candidate for the constituency of Wimbledon at the 2019 general election. He was defeated by the incumbent Conservative MP, Stephen Hammond, but greatly increased the Lib Dems' vote share to a second-placed 19,745 (37.2%), reducing Hammond's majority to just 628 votes. He was once again elected to the council in Merton at the 2022 local elections, this time as one of three Lib Dem councillors in the Wimbledon Town and Dundonald ward. After once again securing the party's nomination for the Wimbledon parliamentary constituency at the 2024 general election, he gained the seat from the Conservatives (Hammond having not sought re-election), with a vote share of 24,790 (45.1%) and a majority of 12,610 (22.9%).

He is currently the Lib Dem front bench spokesperson on Northern Ireland and a member of the House of Commons' Home Affairs Select Committee and the Northern Ireland Affairs Select Committee.

== Personal life ==
Kohler is married to Samantha MacArthur, a company director and Merton Liberal Democrat councillor, with whom he has four daughters.

In 2014 he sustained severe injuries when he was beaten by burglars during a raid at his home. He suffered a fractured eye socket, broken nose and severe internal bleeding. He credits that attack, and the subsequent restorative justice session in which he met one of his attackers, as the reason for his belated decision to enter active politics.

== Bibliography ==
=== Books ===
- Property Law: Commentary and Materials (2006), with Alison Clarke; part of Law in Context

=== Articles and chapters ===
- "Property Law" in Current Legal Problems Vol 46 (1993)
- "The Death of Ownership and the Demise of Property" in Current Legal Problems Vol 53 (2000)

Parliament of the United Kingdom
Preceded by Stephen Hammond	Member of Parliament for Wimbledon; 2024–present	Incumbent
