= St Helier (Merton ward) =

Electoral division in the London Borough of Merton

- Electoral ward for the Merton London Borough Council
- St Helier (Merton) ward boundaries
- Borough: Merton
- County: Greater London
- Population: 11,312 (2021) (Note: 2021 Census data reported for 2022 ward boundaries)
- Electorate: 7,554 (2022)
- Area: 1.598 square kilometres (0.617 sq mi)

Current electoral ward
- Created: 1978
- Councillors: 3
- GSS code: E05000470 (2002–2022; E05013824 (2022–present)

St Helier is an electoral ward in the London Borough of Merton. The ward was first used in the 1978 elections. It returns councillors to Merton London Borough Council.

== Merton council elections since 2022 ==
There was a revision of ward boundaries in Merton in 2022.

=== 2024 by-election ===
The by-election on 4 July 2024 took place on the same day as the United Kingdom general election. It followed the resignation of Helena Dollimore.

2024 St Helier by-election
| Party | Candidate | Votes | % | ±% |
|---|---|---|---|---|
| Labour | Shuile Syeda | 1,865 | 48 | |
| Green | Pippa Maslin | 872 | 22 | |
| Conservative | Gillian Lewis-Lavender | 687 | 18 | |
| Liberal Democrats | Asif Ashraf | 471 | 12 | |
| Turnout | | | | |
| Labour hold | | Swing | | |

=== 2022 election ===
The election took place on 5 May 2022.

2022 Merton London Borough Council election: St Helier
| Party | Candidate | Votes | % | ±% |
|---|---|---|---|---|
| Labour | Helena Dollimore | 1,393 | 60.8 | N/A |
| Labour | Andrew Judge | 1,262 | 55.1 | N/A |
| Labour | Dennis Pearce | 1,258 | 54.9 | N/A |
| Conservative | Olivia Barlow | 475 | 20.7 | N/A |
| Conservative | Stephen Crowe | 415 | 18.1 | N/A |
| Green | Pippa Maslin | 386 | 16.8 | N/A |
| Conservative | Inam Bokth | 380 | 16.6 | N/A |
| Green | Rachel Brooks | 340 | 14.8 | N/A |
| Green | James Rae | 227 | 9.9 | N/A |
| Liberal Democrats | Vivian Vella | 151 | 6.6 | N/A |
| Liberal Democrats | Richard Shillito | 149 | 6.5 | N/A |
| Liberal Democrats | Guy Weston | 117 | 5.1 | N/A |
| Turnout | | 2,291 | 30.3 | |
| Labour win (new boundaries) | | | | |
| Labour win (new boundaries) | | | | |
| Labour win (new boundaries) | | | | |

== 2002–2022 Merton council elections ==
St Helier (Merton) ward boundaries from 2002 to 2022

=== 2021 by-election ===
The by-election took place on 6 May 2021, following the resignation of Kelly Braund. It was held on the same day as the 2021 London mayoral election and 2021 London Assembly election.

2021 St Helier by-election
| Party | Candidate | Votes | % | ±% |
|---|---|---|---|---|
| Labour | Helena Dollimore | 1,859 | 54.4 | |
| Conservative | Isaac Kwaku Frimpong | 907 | 26.6 | |
| Green | Pippa Maslin | 409 | 12.0 | |
| Liberal Democrats | Simon John Jones | 241 | 7.1 | |
| Majority | | 952 | | |
| Turnout | | 3,416 | 41.4 | |
| Labour hold | | Swing | | |

=== 2018 election ===
The election took place on 3 May 2018.

=== 2014 election ===
The election took place on 22 May 2014.

=== 2010 election ===
The election on 6 May 2010 took place on the same day as the United Kingdom general election.

=== 2006 election ===
The election took place on 4 May 2006.

=== 2002 election ===
The election took place on 2 May 2002.

== 1978–2002 Merton council elections ==
=== 1998 election ===
The election took place on 7 May 1998.

=== 1994 election ===
The election took place on 5 May 1994.

=== 1990 election ===
The election took place on 3 May 1990.

=== 1986 election ===
The election took place on 8 May 1986.

=== 1982 election ===
The election took place on 6 May 1982.

=== 1978 election ===
The election took place on 4 May 1978.
