= Figge's Marsh =

- Electoral ward for the Merton London Borough Council
- Figge's Marshward boundaries since 2022
- Borough: Merton
- County: Greater London
- Population: 11,809 (2021) (Note: 2021 Census data reported for 2022 ward boundaries)
- Electorate: 7,581 (2022)
- Area: 1.058 square kilometres (0.408 sq mi)

Current electoral ward
- Created: 1978
- GSS code: E05013814 (2022–present)

Figge's Marsh is an electoral ward in the London Borough of Merton. The ward was first used in the 1978 elections. It returns councillors to Merton London Borough Council.

== Merton council elections since 2022 ==
There was a revision of ward boundaries in Merton in 2022.

=== 2024 by-election ===
The by-election on 4 July 2024 took place on the same day as the United Kingdom general election. It followed the resignation of Natasha Irons.

2024 Figge's Marsh by-election
Party	Candidate	Votes	%	±%
Labour	Franca Ofeimu	2,529	66	
Green	Sally Pannifex	515	13	
Conservative	Suzanne Grocott	509	13	
Liberal Democrats	William Woodward	272	7	
Turnout				
Labour hold		Swing		

=== 2022 election ===
The election took place on 5 May 2022.

2022 Merton London Borough Council election: Figge's Marsh
Party	Candidate	Votes	%	±%
Labour	Agatha Akyigyina	1,962	78.6	N/A
Labour	Natasha Irons	1,882	75.4	N/A
Labour	Daniel Johnston	1,753	70.2	N/A
Conservative	Linda Taylor	293	11.7	N/A
Conservative	Alice Hammond	267	10.7	N/A
Conservative	Tim Williamson	257	10.3	N/A
Green	Sally Pannifex	221	8.9	N/A
Liberal Democrats	Eloise Bailey	152	6.1	N/A
Liberal Democrats	John Raymond	115	4.6	N/A
Liberal Democrats	Nicholas Thomas	103	4.1	N/A
TUSC	April Ashley	84	3.4	N/A
Turnout		2,496	32.9	
Labour win (new boundaries)				
Labour win (new boundaries)				
Labour win (new boundaries)				

== 2002–2022 Merton council elections ==
Figge's Marsh ward boundaries from 2002 to 2022

There was a revision of ward boundaries in Merton in 2002.

=== 2018 election ===
The election took place on 3 May 2018.

=== 2014 election ===
The election took place on 22 May 2014.

=== 2010 election ===
The election on 6 May 2010 took place on the same day as the United Kingdom general election.

=== 2006 election ===
The election took place on 4 May 2006.

=== 2002 election ===
The election took place on 2 May 2002.

== 1978–2002 Merton council elections ==
=== 1998 election ===
The election took place on 7 May 1998.

=== 1994 election ===
The election took place on 5 May 1994.

=== 1990 election ===
The election took place on 3 May 1990.

=== 1986 election ===
The election took place on 8 May 1986.

=== 1982 election ===
The election took place on 6 May 1982.

=== 1978 election ===
The election took place on 4 May 1978.
