= 1978 Kingston upon Thames London Borough Council election =

The 1978 Kingston upon Thames Council election took place on 4 May 1978 to elect members of Kingston upon Thames London Borough Council in London, England. The whole council was up for election and the Conservative party stayed in overall control of the council.

== Election result ==
Party	Votes	Seats	
Conservative Party	68,296 (59.52%)	45 (90.0%)	45 / 50
Labour Party	31,144 (27.14%)	5 (10%)	5 / 50
Liberal Party	15,067 (13.13%)	0 (0.0%)	0 / 50
Women's Truth and Unity	171 (0.15%)	0 (0.0%)	0 / 52
Independent	69 (0.06%)	0 (0.0%)	0 / 52

↓
5	45
Labour	Conservative

== Ward results ==
Berrylands (3)
Party	Candidate	Votes	%	±%

Burlington (2)
Party	Candidate	Votes	%	±%

Cambridge (3)
Party	Candidate	Votes	%	±%

Canbury (3)
Party	Candidate	Votes	%	±%

Chessington North (2)
Party	Candidate	Votes	%	±%

Chessington South (3)
Party	Candidate	Votes	%	±%

Coombe (2)
Party	Candidate	Votes	%	±%

Grove (3)
Party	Candidate	Votes	%	±%

Hill (2)
Party	Candidate	Votes	%	±%

Hook (2)
Party	Candidate	Votes	%	±%

Malden Manor (2)
Party	Candidate	Votes	%	±%

Norbiton (3)
Party	Candidate	Votes	%	±%

Norbiton Park (2)
Party	Candidate	Votes	%	±%

St James (3)
Party	Candidate	Votes	%	±%

St Marks (3)
Party	Candidate	Votes	%	±%

Surbiton Hill (3)
Party	Candidate	Votes	%	±%

Tolworth East (2)
Party	Candidate	Votes	%	±%

Tolworth South (2)
Party	Candidate	Votes	%	±%

Tolworth West (2)
Party	Candidate	Votes	%	±%

Tudor (3)
Party	Candidate	Votes	%	±%
