= Longthornton (ward) =

- Electoral ward for the Merton London Borough Council
- Borough: Merton
- County: Greater London
- Population: 11,903 (2021)
- Major settlements: Longthornton
- Area: 1.519 km²

Current electoral ward
- Created: 1978
- Councillors: 3

Longthornton is an electoral ward in the London Borough of Merton. The ward was first used in the 1978 elections and elects three councillors to Merton London Borough Council.

== Geography ==
The ward is named after the Longthornton area.

== Councillors ==
Election	Councillors		
2022	Brenda Fraser (Labour)	Ross Garrod (Labour)	Marsie Skeete (Labour)

== Elections ==
=== 2022 ===
Longthornton (3)
Party	Candidate	Votes	%	±%
Labour	Brenda Fraser*	1,869	72.2	N/A
Labour	Ross Garrod	1,662	64.2	N/A
Labour	Marsie Skeete*	1,584	61.2	N/A
Conservative	Brian Lewis-Lavender	453	17.5	N/A
Conservative	Delvalee Willie	425	16.4	N/A
Conservative	Michael Ormrod	417	16.1	N/A
Green	Leila Boyd	332	12.8	N/A
Liberal Democrats	Simon Jones	217	8.4	N/A
Liberal Democrats	Nicholas Harris	198	7.6	N/A
Liberal Democrats	Kaweh Beheshtizadeh	191	7.4	N/A
Turnout		2,590	32.1	
Labour hold				
Labour hold				
Labour hold				

== See also ==
- List of electoral wards in Greater London
