= Raynes Park (ward) =

- Electoral ward for the Merton London Borough Council
- Borough: Merton
- County: Greater London
- Population: 12,302 (2021)
- Major settlements: Raynes Park
- Area: 1.852 km²

Current electoral ward
- Created: 1978
- Councillors: 3

Raynes Park is an electoral ward in the London Borough of Merton. The ward was first used in the 1978 elections and elects three councillors to Merton London Borough Council.

== Geography ==
The ward is named after the Raynes Park area.

== Councillors ==
Election	Councillors		
2022	Chessie Flack (Liberal Democrat)	Matthew Willis (Liberal Democrat)	Victoria Wilson (Liberal Democrat)

== Elections ==
=== 2022 ===
Raynes Park (3)
Party	Candidate	Votes	%	±%
Liberal Democrats	Victoria Wilson	1,819	44.9	N/A
Liberal Democrats	Chessie Flack	1,796	44.3	N/A
Liberal Democrats	Matthew Willis	1,753	43.2	N/A
Conservative	David Dean*	1,287	31.7	N/A
Conservative	Adam Bush*	1,264	31.2	N/A
Conservative	Omar Bush*	1,223	30.2	N/A
Labour	Becky Hooper	767	18.9	N/A
Labour	Wayne Busbridge	707	17.4	N/A
Labour	Harry Platts	662	16.3	N/A
Green	Peter Gay	421	10.4	N/A
Turnout		4,054	46.9	
Liberal Democrats gain from Conservative				
Liberal Democrats gain from Conservative				
Liberal Democrats gain from Conservative				

== See also ==
- List of electoral wards in Greater London
