= Graveney (Merton ward) =

- Electoral ward for the Merton London Borough Council
- Borough: Merton
- County: Greater London
- Population: 11,560 (2021)
- Area: 1.112 km²

Current electoral ward
- Created: 1978
- Councillors: 3 (since 2002); 2 (until 2002)

Graveney is an electoral ward in the London Borough of Merton. The ward was first used in the 1978 elections and elects three councillors to Merton London Borough Council.

== Geography ==
The ward is named after the River Graveney.

== Councillors ==
Election	Councillors		
2022	Sheri-Ann Bhim (Labour)	Billy Hayes (Labour)	Linda Kirby MBE (Labour)

== Elections ==
=== 2022 ===
Graveney (3)
Party	Candidate	Votes	%	±%
Labour	Linda Kirby*	2,182	75.4	N/A
Labour	Sheri Ann Bhim	2,097	72.5	N/A
Labour	Billy Hayes	2,009	69.5	N/A
Green	Rupert Stevens	422	14.6	N/A
Conservative	Louis Altman	385	13.3	N/A
Conservative	Sally Hammond	363	12.6	N/A
Conservative	Ricky Osei	323	11.2	N/A
Liberal Democrats	Christine Peace	199	6.9	N/A
Liberal Democrats	Yue Hang Ho	166	5.7	N/A
Liberal Democrats	Quresh Mukadam	142	4.9	N/A
Turnout		2,892	35.2	
Labour hold				
Labour hold				
Labour hold				

== See also ==
- List of electoral wards in Greater London
