= Colliers Wood (ward) =

Electoral ward in London, England

- Electoral ward for the Merton London Borough Council
- Borough: Merton
- County: Greater London
- Population: 11,560 (2021)
- Major settlements: Colliers Wood
- Area: 1.112 km²

Current electoral ward
- Created: 1978
- Councillors: 3

Colliers Wood is an electoral ward in the London Borough of Merton. The ward was first used in the 1978 elections and elects three councillors to Merton London Borough Council.

== Geography ==
The ward is named after the Colliers Wood area.

== Councillors ==
Election	Councillors		
2022	Laxmi Attawar (Labour)	Caroline Cooper-Marbiah (Labour)	Stuart Neaverson (Labour)

== Elections ==
=== 2022 ===
Colliers Wood (3)
Party	Candidate	Votes	%	±%
Labour	Caroline Cooper-Marbiah*	1,907	61.9	N/A
Labour	Laxmi Attawar*	1,809	58.7	N/A
Labour	Stuart Neaverson	1,563	50.7	N/A
Green	Philip Geraghty	855	27.7	N/A
Green	Thomas Walsh	696	22.6	N/A
Conservative	Harry Todd	400	13.0	N/A
Conservative	Dylan White	369	12.0	N/A
Conservative	Katarzyna Markham	359	11.6	N/A
Liberal Democrats	Emily Robertson	276	9.0	N/A
Liberal Democrats	Shipra Gupta	265	8.6	N/A
Liberal Democrats	John Kenny	230	7.5	N/A
Turnout		3,083	37.2	
Labour hold				
Labour hold				
Labour hold				

== See also ==
- List of electoral wards in Greater London
