= Wimbledon Town and Dundonald =

Electoral ward in London, England

- Electoral ward for the Merton London Borough Council
- Borough: Merton
- County: Greater London
- Population: 12,966 (2021)
- Major settlements: Wimbledon, London
- Area: 1.480 km²

Current electoral ward
- Created: 2022
- Councillors: 3

Wimbledon Town and Dundonald is an electoral ward in the London Borough of Merton. The ward was first used in the 2022 elections and elects three councillors to Merton London Borough Council.

== Geography ==
The ward is named after Wimbledon and Dundonald areas.

== Councillors ==
Election	Councillors		
2022	Anthony Fairclough (Liberal Democrat)	Paul Kohler (Liberal Democrat)	Simon McGrath (Liberal Democrat)

== Elections ==
=== 2022 ===
Wimbledon Town & Dundonald (3)
Party	Candidate	Votes	%	±%
Liberal Democrats	Paul Kohler*	2,637	58.8	N/A
Liberal Democrats	Anthony Fairclough*	2,463	54.9	N/A
Liberal Democrats	Simon McGrath*	2,252	50.2	N/A
Conservative	Suzanne Grocott	1,144	25.5	N/A
Conservative	James Holmes*	1,053	23.5	N/A
Conservative	Michael Bull	1,041	23.2	N/A
Labour	Abigail Jones	704	15.7	N/A
Labour	Terry Daniels	583	13.0	N/A
Green	Laura Collins	572	12.8	N/A
Labour	Devina Paul	553	12.3	N/A
Turnout		4,485	51.0	
Liberal Democrats win (new seat)				
Liberal Democrats win (new seat)				
Liberal Democrats win (new seat)				

== See also ==
- List of electoral wards in Greater London
