= Stephen Hammond =

British politician (born 1962)

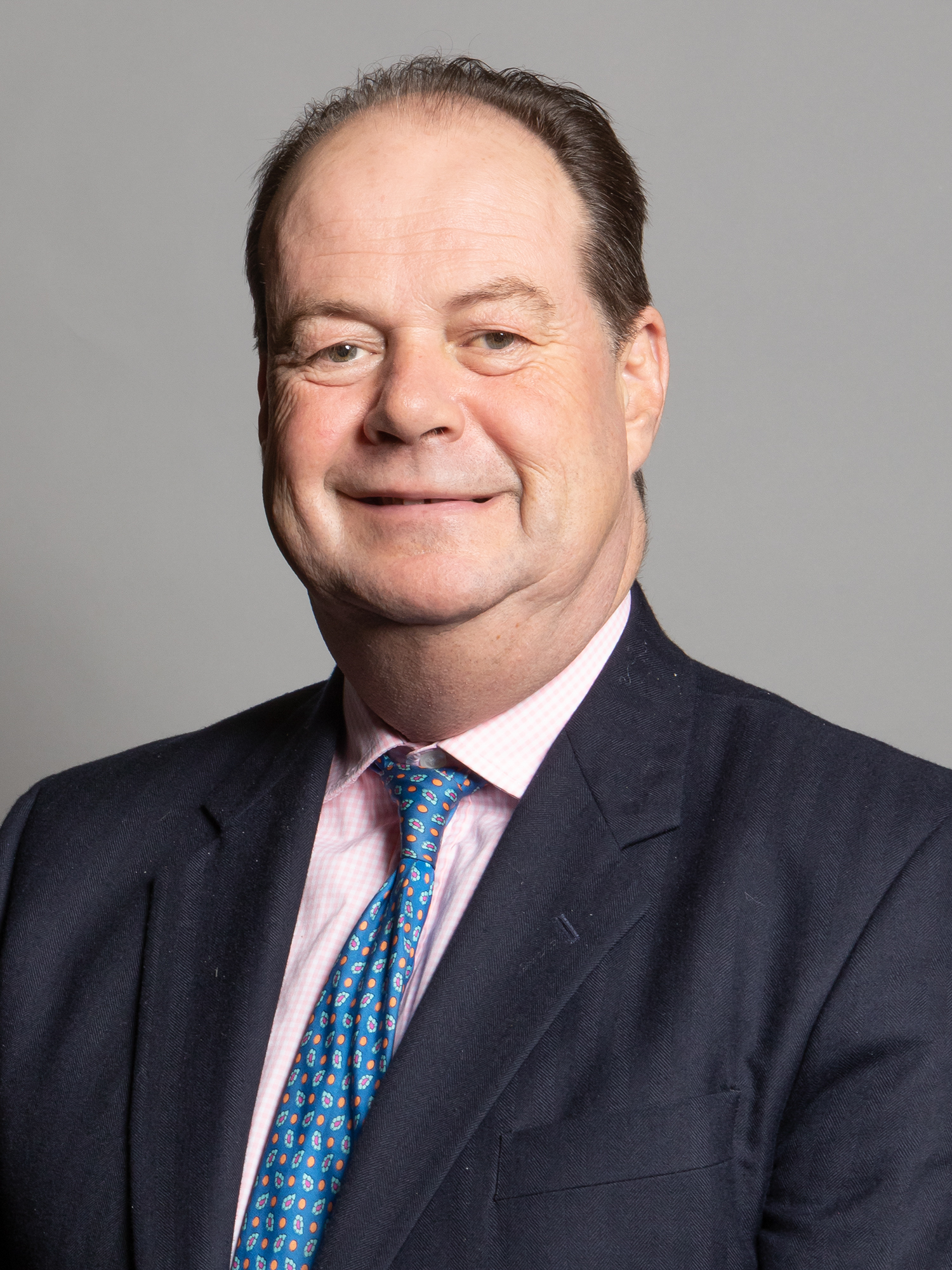
- Official portrait, 2020

Minister of State for Health
- In office 16 November 2018 – 25 July 2019
- Prime Minister: Theresa May; Boris Johnson
- Preceded by: Steve Barclay
- Succeeded by: Chris Skidmore

Vice Chairman of the Conservative Party for London
- In office 20 July 2017 – 16 December 2017
- Leader: Theresa May
- Preceded by: Position established
- Succeeded by: Paul Scully

Parliamentary Under-Secretary of State for Transport
- In office 4 September 2012 – 15 July 2014
- Prime Minister: David Cameron
- Preceded by: Mike Penning
- Succeeded by: Claire Perry

Member of Parliament for Wimbledon
- In office 5 May 2005 – 30 May 2024
- Preceded by: Roger Casale
- Succeeded by: Paul Kohler

Personal details
- Born: 4 February 1962 (age 64) Southampton, Hampshire, England
- Party: Conservative (Note: Whip suspended from 3 September 2019 to 29 October 2019.)
- Spouse: Sally (née Brodie)
- Education: Queen Mary University of London
- Occupation: Politician
- Website: www.stephenhammond.net

Stephen William Hammond (born 4 February 1962) is a British politician who served as the Member of Parliament (MP) for Wimbledon from 2005 to 2024. He is a member of the Conservative Party.

On 4 September 2012, Hammond was appointed Parliamentary Under-Secretary of State for Transport, with responsibility for buses, rail and shipping. He lost his ministerial post in the reshuffle on 15 July 2014 and was succeeded by Claire Perry. He became Vice Chairman of the Conservative Party for London on 20 July 2017 and was sacked the following 16 December after participating in a Brexit rebellion against the government of Theresa May three days earlier. Hammond was however appointed to be a Minister of State at the Department of Health and Social Care on 16 November 2018, following the promotion of Steve Barclay to the position of Secretary of State for Exiting the European Union.

On 3 September 2019, he had the whip removed after voting for a bill ruling out leaving the European Union without a deal. However, on 29 October he was one of ten Conservative MPs to have the whip restored.

== Early life and career ==
Stephen Hammond was born in Southampton and educated at the private King Edward VI School in the city, before reading Economics at Queen Mary University of London. After graduating with a Bachelor of Science degree, he began a career in finance at a leading fund management house and subsequently worked for major investment banks. Hammond was appointed a Director of the Equities division of Dresdner Kleinwort Benson in 1994 and four years later joined Commerzbank Securities. In 2000 he was promoted to Director, Pan European Research, with responsibility for seventy professionals based in London and across Europe.

== Political career ==
Hammond first stood for Parliament in North Warwickshire at the 1997 general election, coming second with 31.2% of the vote behind the incumbent Labour MP Mike O'Brien.

At the 2001 general election, Hammond stood in Wimbledon, coming second with 36.6% of the vote behind the incumbent Labour MP Roger Casale.

He was elected a councillor for the Village ward in the London Borough of Merton election in 2002 and subsequently became Deputy Leader of the Conservative Group on Merton Council.

At the 2005 general election, Hammond was elected to Parliament as MP for Wimbledon, winning with 41.2% of the vote and a majority of 2,301. After the election, David Cameron appointed him as Shadow Minister for Transport on the Opposition front bench.

At the 2010 general election, Hammond was re-elected as MP for Wimbledon with an increased vote share of 49.1% and an increased majority of 11,408. Following the election, Hammond became Parliamentary Private Secretary to Eric Pickles, Secretary of State for Communities and Local Government. On 4 September 2012, he was appointed Parliamentary Under-Secretary of State for Transport. He was removed from that post following a Cabinet reshuffle in July 2014.

In 2012, Hammond was the subject of a parliamentary investigation after it was revealed that he had failed to disclose investments in Harwood Film partnership, a legal investment scheme which permitted the deferral of tax payments, in the Register of Members' Interests. He subsequently apologised for the "oversight" in not registering the financial interest but was cleared of any wrongdoing.

In 2013, Hammond consistently voted in favour of allowing same-sex couples to marry. Following the confidence and supply arrangement between the Conservatives and the DUP after 2017 general election, Hammond promised to stand up and protect LGBT+ and women's rights from any potential dilution. In 2019, he voted to extend abortion and same-sex marriage to Northern Ireland.

In December 2014, Hammond assumed a second job as an adviser to Inmarsat; he was cleared to do so by the Advisory Committee on Business Appointments. He had been criticised earlier that year for having been the fourth most frequent user of ministerial chauffeur-driven "top up" cars, at 138 uses per year, during his time in office as Parliamentary Under-Secretary of State for Transport. Hammond had previously criticised Ken Livingstone in the House of Commons for setting up companies to reduce his tax bill. The Daily Telegraph subsequently alleged that Hammond had sought to avoid tax by registering the ownership of his Portuguese villa through an offshore-registered company, which his lawyers described as a "normal" arrangement that "did not result in tax benefits for him or his wife".

The article about Stephen Hammond on Wikipedia was one of a number edited in May 2015 by computers owned by Parliament in what The Daily Telegraph described as "a deliberate attempt to hide embarrassing information from the electorate." The deleted information concerned his frequent use of chauffeur-driven cars while in government.

Hammond was again re-elected at the 2015 general election with an increased vote share of 52.1% and an increased majority of 12,619.

Hammond announced in early 2016 that he would wait until Cameron's renegotiations before endorsing either a Remain vote or a Leave vote in the 2016 referendum on the United Kingdom's membership of the European Union. On 14 June 2016, he endorsed a vote to remain in the European Union.

At the snap 2017 general election, Hammond was again re-elected, with a decreased vote share of 46.5% and a decreased majority of 5,622.

On 13 December 2017, Hammond was involved in a rebellion against the government of Theresa May in which the government suffered a defeat on a key Brexit vote about granting MPs a 'meaningful vote' in Parliament. He was subsequently dismissed as the Conservative party vice-chairman over the incident.

In the 2019 Conservative leadership election, Hammond endorsed Matt Hancock's bid for the party leadership. Hammond lost the party whip during the September 2019 suspension of rebel Conservative MPs for voting to prevent a no-deal Brexit. Despite this, he was selected as the Conservative candidate for the next general election.

Hammond was again re-elected at the 2019 general election with a decreased vote share of 38.4% and a decreased majority of 628.

Since January 2021, he has served as the Deputy Chair of the Conservative European Forum, which proceeded the Conservative Group for Europe. The group calls for close, strategic relationships with Europe advocating for close relationship with European institutions.

In 2021 Hammond was censured by the Advisory Committee on Business Appointments (ACOBA) for an "unacceptable" breach of the ministerial code for failing to seek their advice before taking a second job with the Public Policy Projects thinktank.

Following the publication of the Sue Gray report into Partygate, Hammond revealed he had submitted a letter of no confidence in Prime Minister Boris Johnson.

In September 2023, Hammond announced that he would stand down at the 2024 general election.

=== Summer-born campaign ===
In Parliament, Hammond has been an advocate of giving summer-born and premature children the right to start school a year later, to give them extra time for development. In October 2015 he held an adjournment debate on this issue, arguing that "summer-born children can suffer from long-term development issues and a lag in educational standards". and highlighting the inconsistent treatment of these children by councils. In response, Nick Gibb MP, the Minister of State for Schools, set out plans in a letter to all schools to change the school admissions code to allow summer-born children to start reception class at the age of 5.

In October 2016, Hammond held another adjournment debate on this topic, urging the Government to take action more quickly and to provide a timetable for the changes.

== Personal life ==
Hammond has been married to Sally Hammond since 1991. The couple live in Wimbledon Park and they have one daughter. He employed his wife as his Office Manager on an annual salary of over £45,000, making her one of only six MPs’ assistants paid more than £40,000. Sally Hammond was a Conservative candidate in Graveney ward at the 2022 Merton London Borough Council election.

Hammond used to play hockey for a National League team and for his county. He continued to play veterans hockey for Wimbledon.

Parliament of the United Kingdom
Preceded by Roger Casale	Member of Parliament for Wimbledon; 2005–2024	Succeeded by Paul Kohler
Political offices
Preceded by Mike Penning	Parliamentary Under-Secretary of State for Transport; 2012–2014	Succeeded by Claire Perry
