= Wimbledon Park (ward) =

- Electoral ward for the Merton London Borough Council
- Borough: Merton
- County: Greater London
- Population: 11,071 (2021)
- Major settlements: Wimbledon Park
- Area: 2.008 km²

Current electoral ward
- Created: 2002
- Councillors: 3

Wimbledon Park is an electoral ward in the London Borough of Merton. The ward was first used in the 2002 elections and elects three councillors to Merton London Borough Council.

== Geography ==
The ward is named after the Wimbledon Park area.

== Councillors ==
Election	Councillors		
2022	Jil Hall (Liberal Democrat)	Samantha MacArthur (Liberal Democrat)	Tony Reiss (Liberal Democrat)

== Elections ==
=== 2022 ===
Wimbledon Park (3)
Party	Candidate	Votes	%	±%
Liberal Democrats	Jil Hall	1,451	42.1	N/A
Liberal Democrats	Samantha MacArthur	1,377	39.9	N/A
Liberal Democrats	Tony Reiss	1,358	39.4	N/A
Conservative	Ed Gretton*	1,056	30.6	N/A
Conservative	Oonagh Moulton*	1,053	30.5	N/A
Conservative	Janice Howard*	988	28.6	N/A
Labour	Hugh Constant	783	22.7	N/A
Labour	Pam Treanor	711	20.6	N/A
Labour	Motiur Rahman	621	18.0	N/A
Green	Juliet Boyd	593	17.2	N/A
Turnout		3,449	44.6	
Liberal Democrats gain from Conservative				
Liberal Democrats gain from Conservative				
Liberal Democrats gain from Conservative				

== See also ==
- List of electoral wards in Greater London
