= Hillside (Merton ward) =

- Electoral ward for the Merton London Borough Council
- Borough: Merton
- County: Greater London
- Population: 8,242 (2021)
- Area: 1.074 km²

Current electoral ward
- Created: 1978
- Councillors: 2 (since 2022); 3 (until 2022)

Hillside is an electoral ward in the London Borough of Merton. The ward was first used in the 1978 elections and elects two councillors to Merton London Borough Council.

== Geography ==
The ward is named after the Hillside area.

== Councillors ==
Election	Councillors	
2022	Susie Hicks (Liberal Democrats)	Daniel Holden (Conservative)

== Elections ==
=== 2022 ===
Hillside (2)
Party	Candidate	Votes	%	±%
Liberal Democrats	Susan Hicks	1,105	42.4	N/A
Conservative	Dan Holden*	1,059	40.6	N/A
Conservative	Rob Cossins	1,015	38.9	N/A
Liberal Democrats	Ursula Faulkner	1,005	38.5	N/A
Labour	Rebecca Bottriell	515	19.7	N/A
Labour	Steven Hirsch	464	17.8	N/A
Turnout		2,608	43.4	
Liberal Democrats gain from Conservative				
Conservative hold				

== See also ==
- List of electoral wards in Greater London
