= Pollards Hill (ward) =

- Electoral ward for the Merton London Borough Council
- Borough: Merton
- County: Greater London
- Population: 11,646 (2021)
- Major settlements: Pollards Hill
- Area: 2.123 km²

Current electoral ward
- Created: 1978
- Councillors: 3

Pollards Hill is an electoral ward in the London Borough of Merton. The ward was first used in the 1978 elections and elects three councillors to Merton London Borough Council.

== Geography ==
The ward is named after the Pollards Hill area.

== Councillors ==
Election	Councillors		
2022	Joan Henry (Labour)	Aidan Mundy (Labour and Co-operative)	Martin Whelton (Labour and Co-operative)

== Elections ==
=== 2022 ===
Pollards Hill (3)
Party	Candidate	Votes	%	±%
Labour	Joan Henry*	1,930	78.1	N/A
Labour	Martin Whelton*	1,786	72.2	N/A
Labour	Aidan Mundy*	1,785	72.2	N/A
Conservative	Daniel Amona	366	14.8	N/A
Conservative	Anthony Cole	351	14.2	N/A
Conservative	Beth Mitchell	343	13.9	N/A
Green	Margaret Rogers	174	7.0	N/A
Liberal Democrats	Toni Borrow	125	5.1	N/A
Liberal Democrats	Mary-Jane Jeanes	122	4.9	N/A
Liberal Democrats	Matthew Payne	89	3.6	N/A
Turnout		2,472	30.4	
Labour hold				
Labour hold				
Labour hold				

== See also ==
- List of electoral wards in Greater London
