= Village (Merton ward) =

- Electoral ward for the Merton London Borough Council
- Borough: Merton
- County: Greater London
- Population: 11,804 (2021)
- Major settlements: Wimbledon Village
- Area: 6.751 km²

Current electoral ward
- Created: 1978
- Councillors: 3

Village is an electoral ward in the London Borough of Merton. The ward was first used in the 1978 elections and elects three councillors to Merton London Borough Council.

== Geography ==
The ward is named after the Wimbledon Village area.

== Councillors ==
Election	Councillors		
2022	Max Austin (Conservative)	Thomas Barlow (Conservative)	Andrew Howard (Conservative)

== Elections ==
=== 2022 ===
Village (3)
Party	Candidate	Votes	%	±%
Conservative	Thomas Barlow*	1,931	50.6	N/A
Conservative	Max Austin	1,909	50.0	N/A
Conservative	Andrew Howard*	1,850	48.5	N/A
Liberal Democrats	Fergus Kirman	1,254	32.9	N/A
Liberal Democrats	Alexander Gallagher	1,223	32.1	N/A
Liberal Democrats	Tom Williams	1,166	30.6	N/A
Labour	Shirley Pritchard	495	13.0	N/A
Labour	Franca Ofeimu	465	12.2	N/A
Labour	Geoffrey Thomas	445	11.7	N/A
Green	Sonja Timpson	433	11.3	N/A
Turnout		3,815	44.6	
Conservative hold				
Conservative hold				
Conservative hold				

== See also ==
- List of electoral wards in Greater London
