= Lavender Fields (ward) =

Electoral ward in London Borough of Merton

- Electoral ward for the Merton London Borough Council
- Borough: Merton
- County: Greater London
- Population: 11,369 (2021)
- Major settlements: Lavender Fields
- Area: 1.161 km²

Current electoral ward
- Created: 2002
- Councillors: 3

Lavender Fields is an electoral ward in the London Borough of Merton named after the Lavender Fields area. The ward was first used in the 2002 elections and elects three councillors to Merton London Borough Council. It replaced the ward of Lavender established in 1978 and abolished in 2002.

== Councillors ==
| Election | Councillors | | |
|---|---|---|---|
| 2022 | Billy Christie (Labour) | Edith Macauley MBE (Labour) | Slawek Szczepanski (Labour) |

== Elections ==
=== 2022 ===
Lavender Fields (3)
| Party | Candidate | Votes | % | ±% |
|---|---|---|---|---|
| Labour | Edith Macauley* | 1,608 | 67.8 | N/A |
| Labour | Billy Christie* | 1,580 | 66.6 | N/A |
| Labour | Slawek Szczepanski | 1,390 | 58.6 | N/A |
| Conservative | Rathy Alagaratnam | 420 | 17.7 | N/A |
| Conservative | Angela Cahill | 395 | 16.7 | N/A |
| Green | George Burridge | 365 | 15.4 | N/A |
| Conservative | Fred Rushton | 322 | 13.6 | N/A |
| Liberal Democrats | Elizabeth Barker | 271 | 11.4 | N/A |
| Liberal Democrats | Simon Parritt | 166 | 7.0 | N/A |
| Liberal Democrats | Benedict Fletcher | 117 | 4.9 | N/A |
| Turnout | | 2,371 | 29.6 | |
| Labour hold | | | | |
| Labour hold | | | | |
| Labour hold | | | | |

== See also ==
- List of electoral wards in Greater London
