= Lower Morden (ward) =

- Electoral ward for the Merton London Borough Council
- Borough: Merton
- County: Greater London
- Population: 11,341 (2021)
- Major settlements: Lower Morden
- Area: 2.382 km²

Current electoral ward
- Created: 1978
- Councillors: 3

Lower Morden is an electoral ward in the London Borough of Merton. The ward was first used in the 1978 elections and elects three councillors to Merton London Borough Council.

== Geography ==
The ward is named after the Lower Morden area.

== Councillors ==
Election	Councillors		
2022	Eleanor Cox (Conservative)	Sally Kenny (Labour)	James Williscroft (Labour)

== Elections ==
=== 2022 ===
Lower Morden (3)
Party	Candidate	Votes	%	±%
Labour	Sally Kenny*	1,778	49.1	N/A
Labour	James Williscroft	1,599	44.1	N/A
Conservative	Eleanor Cox	1,536	42.4	N/A
Labour	Miran Hassan	1,531	42.3	N/A
Conservative	Andrew Cunningham	1,490	41.1	N/A
Conservative	James Bogle	1,469	40.5	N/A
Green	Martin Astrand	384	10.6	N/A
Liberal Democrats	Gabriel Luck	271	7.5	N/A
Liberal Democrats	Nicholas Miles	216	6.0	N/A
Liberal Democrats	Jean-Bernard Tanqueray	187	5.2	N/A
Turnout		3,623	43.1	
Labour hold				
Labour hold				
Conservative gain from Labour				

== See also ==
- List of electoral wards in Greater London
