= West Barnes (ward) =

- Electoral ward for the Merton London Borough Council
- Borough: Merton
- County: Greater London
- Population: 10,610 (2021)
- Major settlements: West Barnes
- Area: 1.952 km²

Current electoral ward
- Created: 1978
- Councillors: 3

West Barnes is an electoral ward in the London Borough of Merton. The ward was first used in the 1978 elections and elects three councillors to Merton London Borough Council.

== Geography ==
The ward is named after the West Barnes area.

== Councillors ==
| Election | Councillors | | |
|---|---|---|---|
| 2022 | Hina Bokhari OBE (Liberal Democrat) | John Oliver (Liberal Democrat) | Robert Page (Liberal Democrat) |

== Elections ==
=== 2022 ===
West Barnes (3)
| Party | Candidate | Votes | % | ±% |
|---|---|---|---|---|
| Liberal Democrats | Hina Bokhari* | 1,655 | 46.2 | N/A |
| Liberal Democrats | John Oliver | 1,612 | 45.0 | N/A |
| Liberal Democrats | Robert Page | 1,348 | 37.7 | N/A |
| Conservative | Gilli Lewis-Lavender | 1,114 | 31.1 | N/A |
| Conservative | Lily Alimi | 1,038 | 29.0 | N/A |
| Conservative | Joseph Hackett | 1,034 | 28.9 | N/A |
| Labour | Tessa Tyler Todd | 711 | 19.9 | N/A |
| Labour | Rob Newbery | 701 | 19.6 | N/A |
| Labour | Ben Butler* | 691 | 19.3 | N/A |
| Green | John Barraball | 441 | 12.3 | N/A |
| Turnout | | 3,580 | 47.3 | |
| Liberal Democrats hold | | | | |
| Liberal Democrats hold | | | | |
| Liberal Democrats hold | | | | |

== See also ==
- List of electoral wards in Greater London
