= Cricket Green (ward) =

- Electoral ward for the Merton London Borough Council
- Borough: Merton
- County: Greater London
- Population: 11,716 (2021)
- Major settlements: Cricket Green
- Area: 2.885 km²

Current electoral ward
- Created: 2002
- Councillors: 3

Cricket Green is an electoral ward in the London Borough of Merton. The ward was first used in the 2002 elections and elects three councillors to Merton London Borough Council.

== Geography ==
The ward is named after the Cricket Green area.

== Councillors ==
Election	Councillors		
2022	Gill Manly (Labour)	Michael Butcher (Labour)	Usaama Kaweesa (Labour)

== Elections ==
=== 2022 ===
Cricket Green (3)
Party	Candidate	Votes	%	±%
Labour	Gill Manly	1,816	70.7	N/A
Labour	Michael Butcher	1,788	69.6	N/A
Labour	Usaama Kaweesa	1,774	69.0	N/A
Conservative	Barbara Mansfield	433	16.8	N/A
Conservative	Gary Watkinson	351	13.7	N/A
Conservative	Peter Ludvigsen	348	13.5	N/A
Green	Christopher Stanton	274	10.7	N/A
Liberal Democrats	Vincent Bolt	196	7.6	N/A
Liberal Democrats	Gail Morrison	182	7.1	N/A
Liberal Democrats	William Woodward	121	4.7	N/A
TUSC	Alex Forbes	80	3.1	N/A
Turnout		2,570	31.7	
Labour hold				
Labour hold				
Labour hold				

== See also ==
- List of electoral wards in Greater London
