= Elizabeth Barker, Baroness Barker =

British peer (born 1961)

The Right Honourable The Baroness Barker
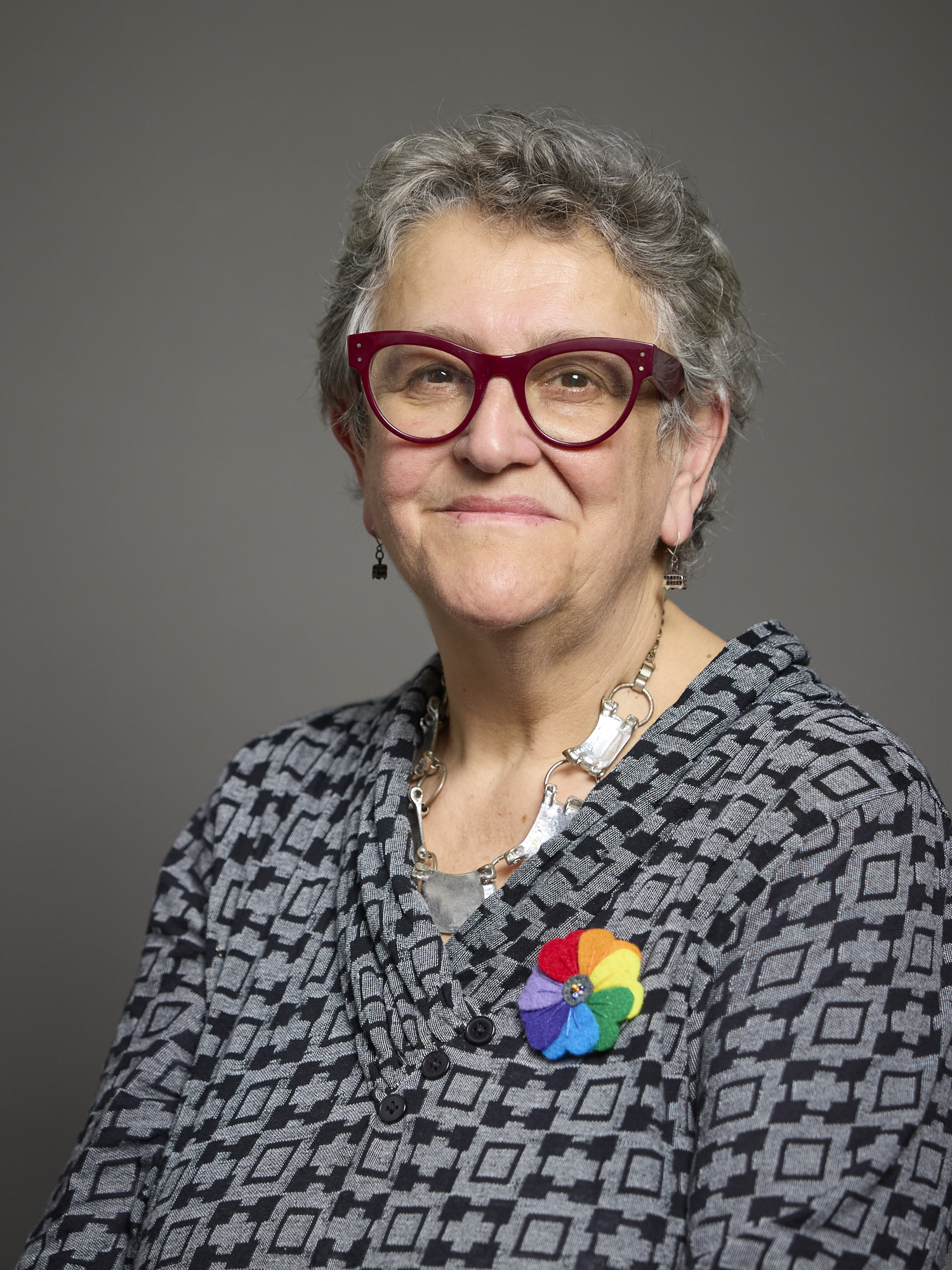
- Official portrait, 2025

Member of the House of Lords
- Lord Temporal
- Life peerage 31 July 1999

Personal details
- Born: 31 January 1961 (age 65)
- Party: Liberal Democrats
- Education: University of Southampton
- Occupation: Politician

Elizabeth Jean Barker, Baroness Barker (born 31 January 1961), is a Liberal Democrat member of the House of Lords.

Barker was educated at Dalziel High School, a secondary school in Motherwell, Scotland. She studied at the University of Southampton.

Barker worked for Age Concern between 1983 and 2007. She was created a life peer as Baroness Barker, of Anagach in Highland, on 31 July 1999, and is a Liberal Democrat spokesperson on the Voluntary Sector and Social Enterprise.

Barker revealed in a speech to the House of Lords that she was in a same-sex relationship during the passage of the Marriage (Same Sex Couples) Act 2013. She since became a Patron of Opening Doors London, a charity which provided support for older LGBT people, and an Ambassador for the Albert Kennedy Trust.

Barker is Co-Chair of both the All-Party Parliamentary Group on HIV, AIDS and Sexual Health and the All-Party Parliamentary Group on Sexual and Reproductive Health in the UK. In the House of Lords she also serves as Deputy Speaker (since April 2024), as Deputy Chairman of Committees, and as Liberal Democrat Spokesperson on the Voluntary Sector. She serves on the board of GiveOut, and LGBTI community foundation.
