= Merton London Borough Council =

Local authority in England

- Coat of arms

- Council logo

Type
- Type: London borough council of the London Borough of Merton
- Houses: Unicameral

Leadership
- Mayor: Shuile Syeda, Labour since 20 May 2026
- Leader: Ross Garrod, Labour since 25 May 2022
- Chief Executive: Hannah Doody since July 2021

Structure
- Seats: 57 councillors
- Graph of the party split among 57 seats.
- Political groups: Administration (32) Labour (32) Other parties (25) Liberal Democrats (19) Conservative (4) Merton Park RA (2)
- Length of term: Whole council elected every four years

Elections
- Voting system: Plurality at-large (FPTP)
- Last election: 7 May 2026
- Next election: 2 May 2030

Meeting place
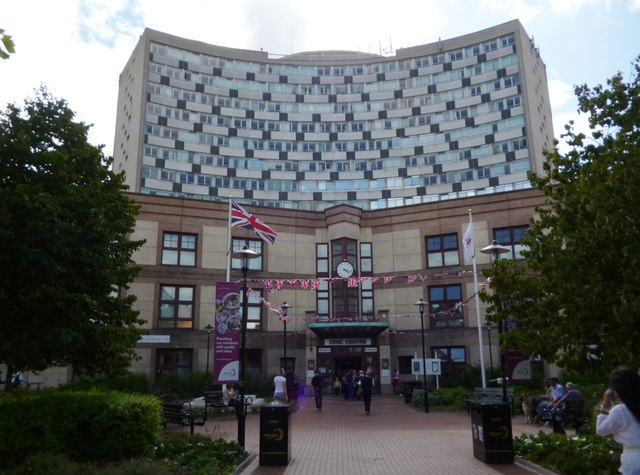
- Civic Centre, London Road, Morden, SM4 5DX

Website
- www.merton.gov.uk

Merton London Borough Council, which styles itself as Merton Council, is the local authority for the London Borough of Merton in Greater London, England. The council is responsible for providing certain services within the borough. The council has been under Labour majority control since 2014. The council is based at Merton Civic Centre in Morden.

== History ==
The London Borough of Merton and its council were created under the London Government Act 1963, with the first election held in 1964. For its first year the council acted as a shadow authority alongside the area's three outgoing authorities, being the councils of the municipal boroughs of Mitcham and Wimbledon and the urban district of Merton and Morden. The new council formally came into its powers on 1 April 1965, at which point the old districts and their councils were abolished.

The council's full legal name is "The Mayor and Burgesses of the London Borough of Merton", but it styles itself Merton Council.

From 1965 until 1986 the council was a lower-tier authority, with upper-tier functions provided by the Greater London Council. The split of powers and functions meant that the Greater London Council was responsible for "wide area" services such as fire, ambulance, flood prevention, and refuse disposal; with the boroughs (including Merton) responsible for "personal" services such as social care, libraries, cemeteries and refuse collection. As an outer London borough council Merton has been a local education authority since 1965. The Greater London Council was abolished in 1986 and its functions passed to the London Boroughs, with some services provided through joint committees.

Since 2000 the Greater London Authority has taken some responsibility for highways and planning control from the council, but within the English local government system the council remains a "most purpose" authority in terms of the available range of powers and functions.

== Powers and functions ==
The local authority derives its powers and functions from the London Government Act 1963 and subsequent legislation, and has the powers and functions of a London borough council. It sets council tax and as a billing authority it also collects precepts for Greater London Authority functions and business rates. It sets planning policies which complement Greater London Authority and national policies, and decides on almost all planning applications accordingly. It is also the local education authority.

== Political control ==
The council has been under Labour majority control since 2014.

The first election was held in 1964, initially operating as a shadow authority alongside the outgoing authorities until it came into its powers on 1 April 1965. Political control of the council since 1965 has been as follows:

Party in control	Years
No overall control	1965–1968
Conservative	1968–1971
Labour	1971–1974
Conservative	1974–1989
No overall control	1989–1990
Labour	1990–2006
No overall control	2006–2014
Labour	2014–present

=== Leadership ===
The role of Mayor of Merton is largely ceremonial. Political leadership is instead provided by the leader of the council. The leaders since 1965 have been:

Councillor	Party	From	To
Vincent Talbot	Conservative	1965	1971
Dennis Hempstead	Labour	1971	1974
Vincent Talbot	Conservative	1974	1975
Allan Jones	Conservative	1975	1980
Harry Cowd	Conservative	1980	1988
John Elvidge	Conservative	1988	1990
Geoffrey Smith	Labour	1990	1991
Tony Colman	Labour	1991	1997
Mike Brunt	Labour	1997	1999
Philip Jones	Labour	1999	2000
Peter Holt	Labour	2000	2001
Andrew Judge	Labour	25 Apr 2001	May 2006
David Williams	Conservative	24 May 2006	May 2010
Stephen Alambritis	Labour	26 May 2010	18 Nov 2020
Mark Allison	Labour	18 Nov 2020	May 2022
Ross Garrod	Labour	25 May 2022	

=== Composition ===
After the 2026 election, the composition of the council is:

Party	Councillors
Labour	32
Liberal Democrats	19
Conservative	4
Merton Park Ward Residents Association	2
Total	57

The next election is due in May 2030.

== Wards ==
The wards of Merton and the number of seats:

1. Abbey (3)
2. Cannon Hill (3)
3. Colliers Wood (3)
4. Cricket Green (3)
5. Figge's Marsh (3)
6. Graveney (3)
7. Hillside (2)
8. Lavender Fields (3)
9. Longthornton (3)
10. Lower Morden (3)
11. Merton Park (2)
12. Pollards Hill (3)
13. Ravensbury (3)
14. Raynes Park (3)
15. St Helier (3)
16. Village (3)
17. Wandle (2)
18. West Barnes (3)
19. Wimbledon Park (3)
20. Wimbledon Town & Dundonald (3)

== Elections ==
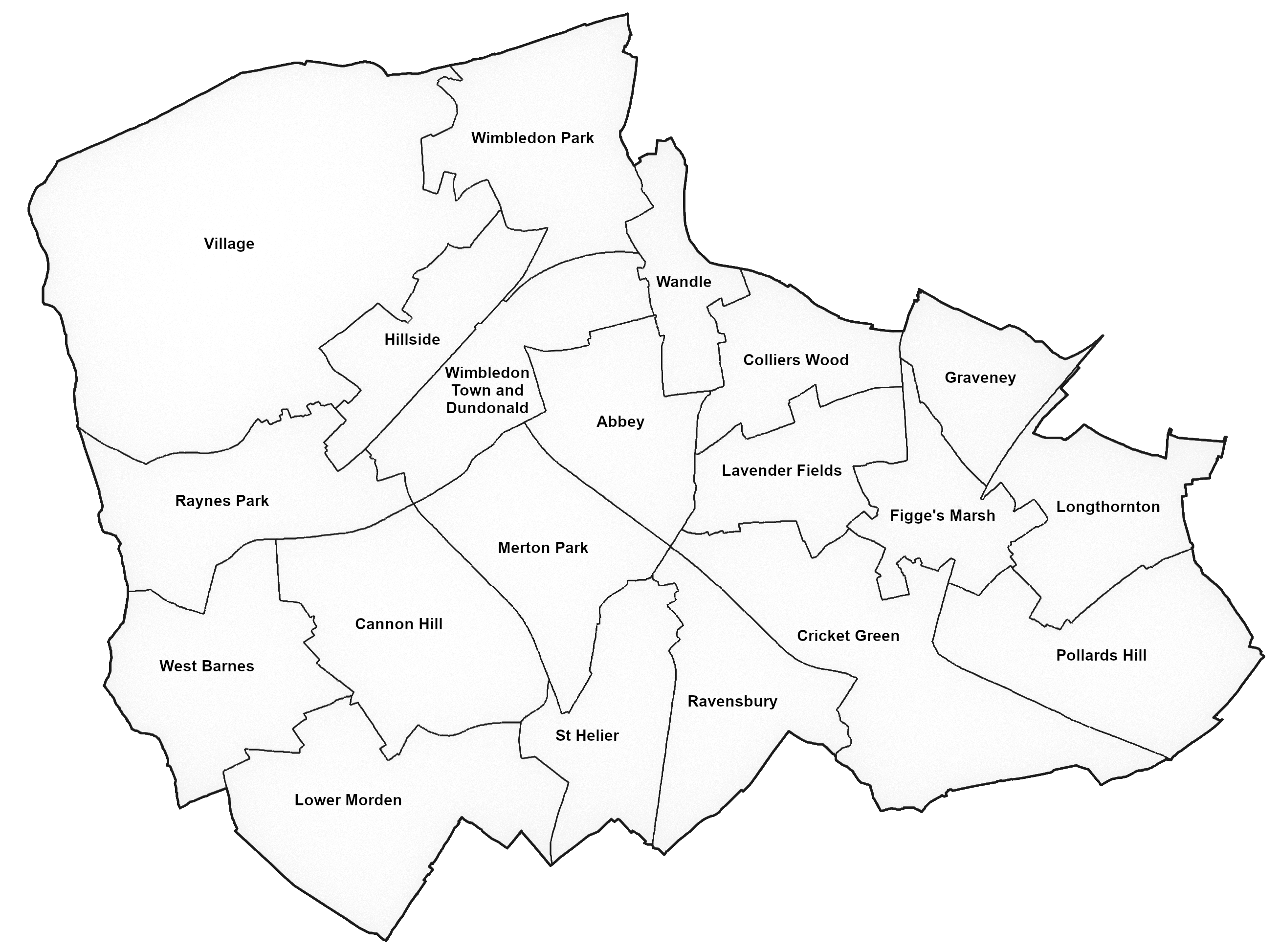
A map showing the wards of Merton 2022 onwards

Since the last boundary changes in 2022 the council has comprised 57 councillors representing 20 wards, with each ward electing two or three councillors. Elections are held every four years.

The political voting patterns in Merton broadly follow the geographical divide between Merton's two UK Parliament constituencies. The eastern Mitcham and Morden constituency, which is held by Labour MP Siobhain McDonagh, contains ten wards and has only elected Labour councillors since 2014, with the exception of a single Conservative councillor elected in Lower Morden in 2022.

The western Wimbledon constituency, which is held by Liberal Democrats MP Paul Kohler, contains ten wards with 27 councillors, 17 of which are currently Liberal Democrats. Since 1990, the ward of Merton Park has only ever returned councillors for Merton Park Ward Residents Association. The most recent elections in 2022 saw the Liberal Democrats replace the Conservatives as the main opposition on Merton Council, winning 17 seats across the Wimbledon wards. They won all council seats in four of the wards, while another four wards were split between the Liberal Democrats and either the Conservatives or Labour. The only ward completely held by the Conservatives is Village, while Labour maintains only a single councillor in each of the Abbey and Wandle wards.

== Premises ==
The council is based at Merton Civic Centre on London Road in Morden. The building began as a 15-storey office block that was privately built as 'Crown House', opening in 1962. The council moved into the building in 1985, having previously been based at Wimbledon Town Hall. A three-storey extension in front of the older building was completed in 1990, including the council chamber.

== Mayors ==
At the annual council meeting, a mayor is elected to serve for a year. At the same time, the council elects a deputy mayor. Since 1978, each mayor must also be an elected councillor.

The mayor also acts as the ceremonial and civic head of the borough during his/her year of office, including chairing council meetings. The post is non-political, although they do get an additional casting vote in the event of a tie. Each year the mayor also chooses two charities which will benefit from a series of fundraising events throughout the mayoral year.

The following have served as mayor since the formation of the borough in 1965:

- 1965–66 Cyril Marsh
- 1966–67 Cyril Black
- 1967–68 George Pearce
- 1968–69 Norman Clarke
- 1969–70 Philip Corbishley
- 1970–71 Alf Leivers
- 1971–72 Jim Coombes
- 1972–73 Jim Brown
- 1973–74 Vera Bonner
- 1974–75 Bernard Clifford
- 1975–76 Norman Healey
- 1976–77 John Watson
- 1977–78 Peter Kenyon
- 1978–79 George Watt
- 1979–80 Ron Haddow
- 1980–81 Tom Bull
- 1981–82 Vincent Talbot
- 1982–83 Rothesay Mackenzie
- 1983–84 Frank Meakings
- 1984–85 Tony Nicholson
- 1985–86 Diana Harris
- 1986–87 Dennis Taylor
- 1987–88 Harold Turner
- 1988–89 Allan Jones
- 1989–90 Barry Edwards
- 1990–91 Joe Abrams
- 1991–92 Peter McCabe
- 1992–93 Slim Flegg
- 1993–94 Marie-Louise de Villiers
- 1994–95 Malcolm Searle
- 1995–96 Bridget Smith
- 1996–97 Slim Flegg
- 1997–98 Sheila Knight
- 1998–99 Linda Kirby
- 1999–2000 Joyce Paton
- 2000–01 Ian Munn
- 2001–02 Stuart Pickover
- 2002–03 Edith Macauley
- 2003–04 Maxi Martin
- 2004–05 Margaret Brierly
- 2005–06 Judy Saunders
- 2006–07 Geraldine Stanford
- 2007–08 John Dehaney
- 2008–09 Martin Whelton
- 2009–10 Nick Draper
- 2010–11 Oonagh Moulton
- 2011–12 Gilli Lewis-Lavender
- 2012–13 David Williams
- 2013–14 Krystal Miller
- 2014–15 Agatha Akyigyina
- 2015–16 David Chung
- 2016–17 Brenda Fraser
- 2017–18 Marsie Skeete
- 2018–19 Mary Curtin
- 2019–20 Janice Howard
- 2020–21 Sally Kenny
- 2021–22 Mike Brunt
- 2022–23 Joan Henry
- 2023–24 Gill Manly
- 2024–25 Slawek Szczepanski
- 2025–26 Martin Whelton
- 2026–Present Shuile Syeda

== Merton Youth Parliament ==
Historically, Merton Council had a youth forum. In 2007, Merton Council replaced its youth forum with Merton Youth Parliament, an elected youth parliament made up of local young people, after it was voted for in an online referendum. Members of Merton Youth Parliament are aged 11 to 19, or 11 to 25 if they have a disability or special needs, and live or study in the borough. All secondary schools and colleges in the borough are entitled to have four members elected to the youth parliament.

Merton Youth Parliament elects a representative to the London Youth Assembly.
