= 1978 London local elections =

- 4 May 1978

All 1,908 on all 32 London boroughs
- Turnout: 42.9% (▲6.6%)
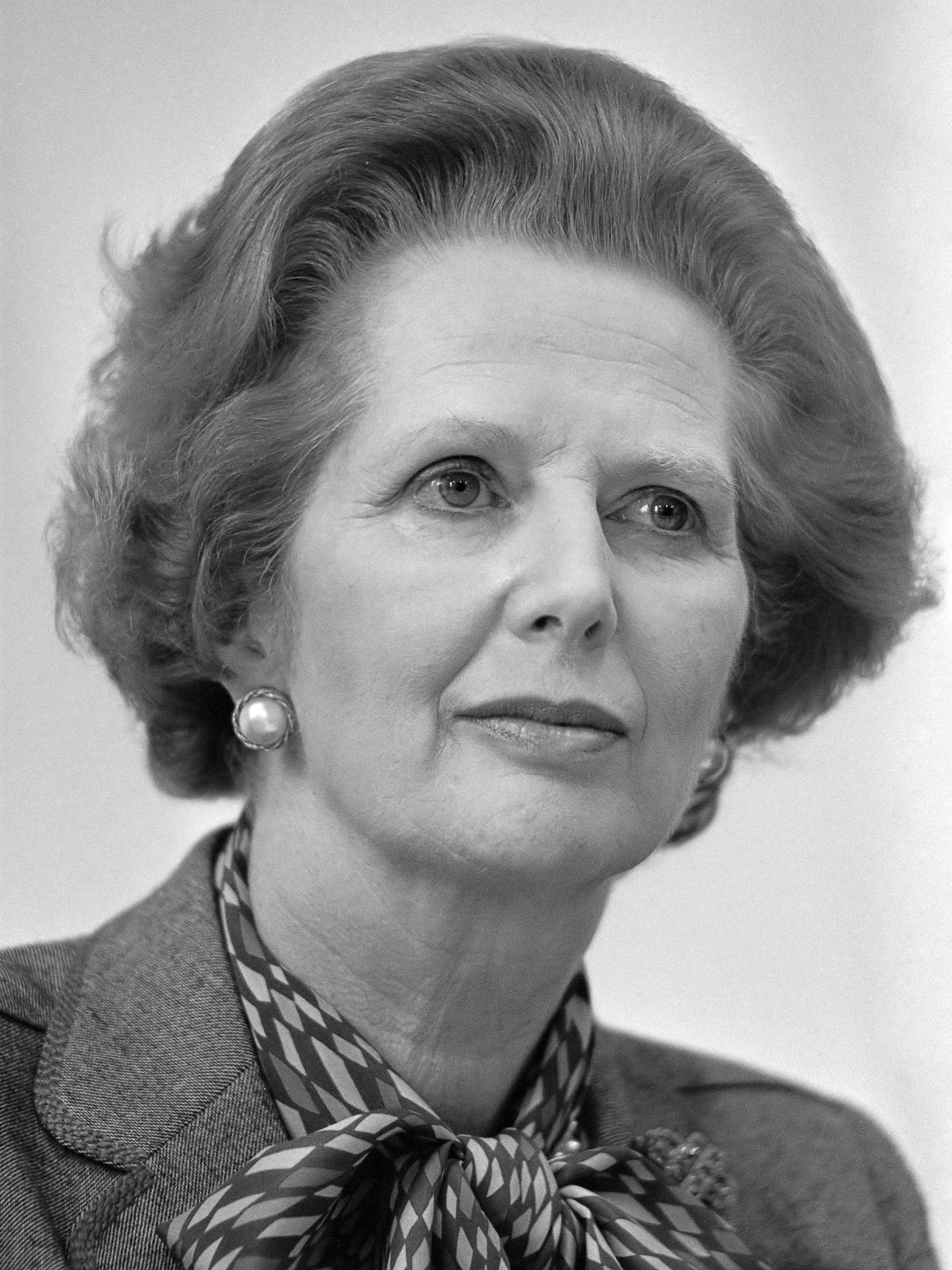

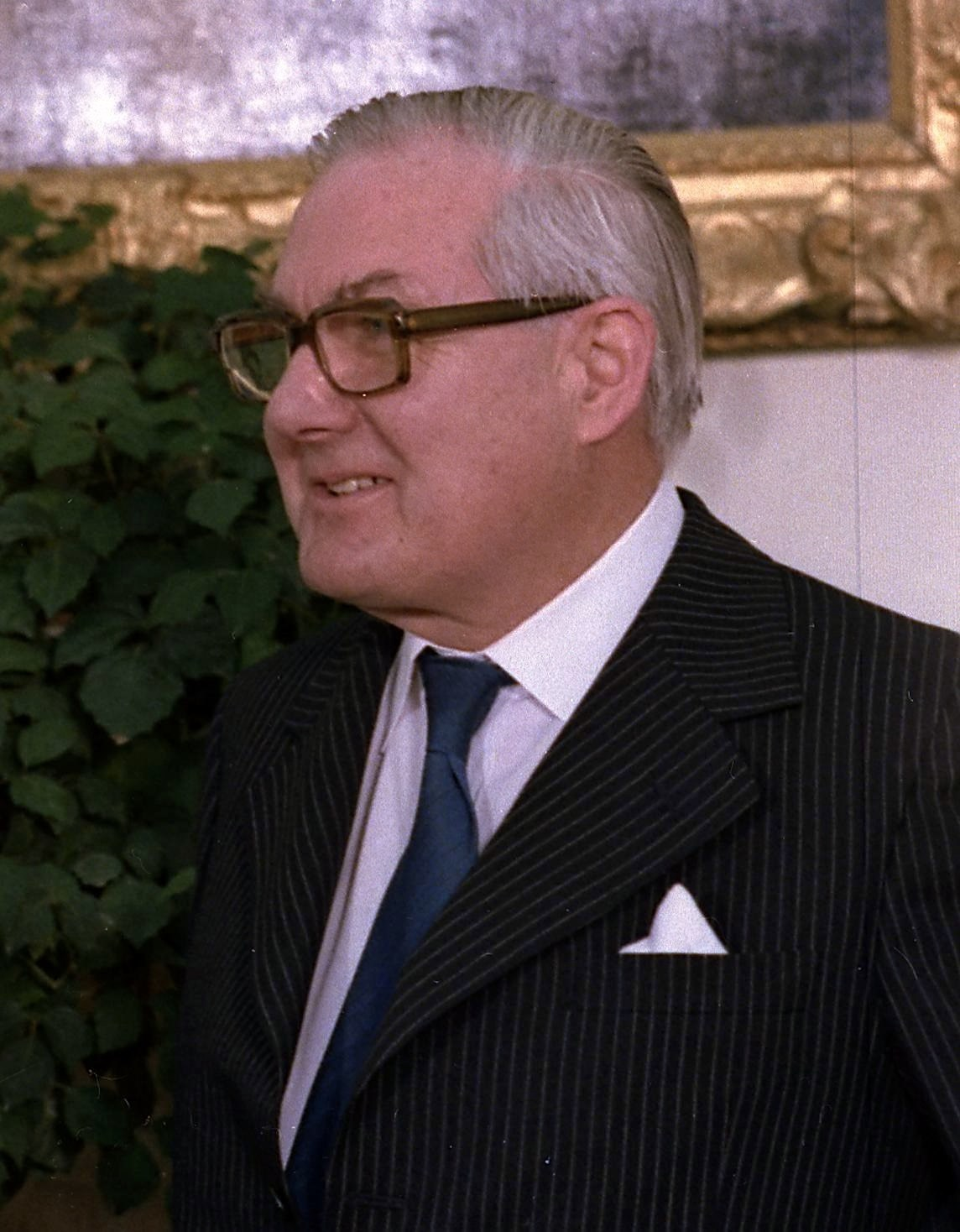
	First party	Second party	Third party
Leader	Margaret Thatcher	James Callaghan	David Steel
Party	Conservative	Labour	Liberal
Leader since	11 February 1975	5 April 1976	7 July 1976
Popular vote	1,037,894	833,526	150,298
Percentage	48.7%	39.1%	7.1%
Swing	▲7.9%	▼2.8%	▼6.0%
Councils	17	14	0
Councils +/–	▲4	▼4	Steady
Councillors	960	882	30
Councillors +/–	▲247	▼208	▲3
- Results by Borough in 1978.

Local government elections took place in London, and some other parts of the United Kingdom on Thursday 4 May 1978. Ward changes took place in every borough (except Enfield) which increased the total number of councillors by 41 from 1,867 to 1,908.

All London borough council seats were up for election. The previous Borough elections in London were in 1974.

== Results summary ==
Party	Votes won	% votes	Change	Seats	% seats	Change	Councils	Change
Conservative	1,037,894	48.7	+7.9	960	50.3	+247	17	+4
Labour	833,526	39.1	-2.8	882	46.2	-208	14	-4
Liberal	150,298	7.1	-6.0	30	1.6	+3	0	±0
Others	108,144	5.1	+0.9	36	1.9	-1	0	±0
No overall control	n/a	n/a	±0	n/a	n/a	n/a	1	±0

- Turnout: 2,213,900 voters cast ballots, a turnout of 42.9% (+6.6%).

== Council results ==
Council	Previous control	Result	Details
Barking	Labour	Labour	Details
Barnet	Conservative	Conservative	Details
Bexley	Conservative	Conservative	Details
Brent	Labour	Labour	Details
Bromley	Conservative	Conservative	Details
Camden	Labour	Labour	Details
Croydon	Conservative	Conservative	Details
Ealing	Labour	Conservative	Details
Enfield	Conservative	Conservative	Details
Greenwich	Labour	Labour	Details
Hackney	Labour	Labour	Details
Hammersmith	Labour	No overall control	Details
Haringey	Labour	Labour	Details
Harrow	Conservative	Conservative	Details
Havering	No overall control	Conservative	Details
Hillingdon	Labour	Conservative	Details
Hounslow	Labour	Labour	Details
Islington	Labour	Labour	Details
Kensington and Chelsea	Conservative	Conservative	Details
Kingston upon Thames	Conservative	Conservative	Details
Lambeth	Labour	Labour	Details
Lewisham	Labour	Labour	Details
Merton	Conservative	Conservative	Details
Newham	Labour	Labour	Details
Redbridge	Conservative	Conservative	Details
Richmond upon Thames	Conservative	Conservative	Details
Southwark	Labour	Labour	Details
Sutton	Conservative	Conservative	Details
Tower Hamlets	Labour	Labour	Details
Waltham Forest	Labour	Labour	Details
Wandsworth	Labour	Conservative	Details
Westminster	Conservative	Conservative	Details

== Overall councillor numbers ==
London local elections 1978 Councillor statistics
Party	Seats	Gain/loss
Conservative	960	+247
Labour	882	-208
Liberal	30	+3
Others	36	-1

== Borough result maps ==
Barnet 1978 results map

Camden 1978 results map

Hammersmith 1978 results map
