= London Liberal Democrats =

London branch of the Liberal Democrats

- Leader in the London Assembly: Hina Bokhari
- Preceded by: Progressive Party (1888–1926); Liberal Party (1926–1988)
- Headquarters: 8–10 Great George Street, London, SW1
- Youth wing: London Young Liberals
- Ideology: Liberalism; Social liberalism; Classical liberalism; Pro-Europeanism
- Political position: Centre to centre-left
- National affiliation: Liberal Democrats
- Colours: Orange
- House of Commons (Parliamentary constituencies in London): 6 / 75
- London Assembly: 2 / 25
- Councillors: 244 / 1,817
- Council control in London: 3 / 32
- Directly elected borough mayors in London: 0 / 5

Website
- londonlibdems.org.uk/

The London Liberal Democrats are the regional party of the Liberal Democrats that operates in Greater London. The organisation is a part of the English Liberal Democrats. The party holds 6 of the 75 seats representing London in the House of Commons, 2 of the 25 seats in the London Assembly, and 244 of the 1,817 London borough councillors. Additionally, the party controls 3 of the 32 London borough councils.

== Current representatives ==
=== Members of Parliament ===
The London Liberal Democrats won 6 of 75 London seats in the House of Commons at the 2024 United Kingdom general election. The table below shows the party's current Members of Parliament (MPs).

MP	Constituency	First elected	Majority	Majority %
Ed Davey	Kingston and Surbiton	1997, 2017	17,235	34.1%
Bobby Dean	Carshalton and Wallington	2024	7,905	16.9%
Paul Kohler	Wimbledon	2024	12,610	22.9%
Sarah Olney	Richmond Park	2016, 2019	17,155	33.3%
Luke Taylor	Sutton and Cheam	2024	3,801	8.0%
Munira Wilson	Twickenham	2019	21,457	40.0%

=== London Assembly members ===
The London Liberal Democrats won 2 of 25 seats in the London Assembly at the 2024 London Assembly election. The table below shows the party's current Assembly Members (AMs).

AM	Constituency	First elected	Majority	Majority %
Hina Bokhari	Additional member	2021	N/A	N/A
Gareth Roberts	South West	2024	16,019	7.8%

=== Councillors ===
The London Liberal Democrats won 243 of 1,817 borough seats and majority control of 3 of 32 boroughs at the 2026 London local elections. The party currently has 244 councillors and controls 3 boroughs, as shown in the table below.

Council	Councillors	Leader	Role in Council
Barking and Dagenham	0 / 51		No seats
Barnet	0 / 63		No seats
Bexley	0 / 45		No seats
Brent	11 / 57	Anton Georgiou	Opposition
Bromley	6 / 58	Julie Ireland	Opposition
Camden	10 / 55	Tom Simon	Opposition
Croydon	2 / 70		Opposition
Ealing	13 / 70	Gary Malcolm	Opposition
Enfield	0 / 63		No seats
Greenwich	0 / 55		No seats
Hackney	0 / 57		No seats
Hammersmith and Fulham	0 / 50		No seats
Haringey	8 / 57	Luke Cawley-Harrison	Opposition
Harrow	0 / 55		No seats
Havering	0 / 55		No seats
Hillingdon	0 / 53		No seats
Hounslow	1 / 62		No seats
Islington	0 / 51		No seats
Kensington and Chelsea	3 / 50	Linda Wade	Opposition
Kingston upon Thames	44 / 48	Andreas Kirsch	Overall control
Lambeth	9 / 63	Donna Harris	Opposition
Lewisham	0 / 54		No seats
Merton	19 / 57	Anthony Fairclough	Opposition
Newham	0 / 66		No seats
Redbridge	0 / 63		No seats
Richmond upon Thames	54 / 54	Gareth Roberts	Overall control
Southwark	12 / 63	Victor Chamberlain	Opposition
Sutton	51 / 55	Ruth Dombey	Overall control
Tower Hamlets	1 / 45		No seats
Waltham Forest	0 / 60		No seats
Wandsworth	0 / 58		No seats
Westminster	0 / 54		No seats

== Electoral performance ==
=== UK general elections ===
Gold indicates the constituencies won by the London Liberal Democrats at the 2024 general election.

The table below shows the London Liberal Democrats results at United Kingdom (UK) general elections since the London Government Act 1963 created the administrative area of Greater London in 1965. Results between 1966 and 1979 are for the Liberal Party, while results between 1983 and 1987 are for the SDP–Liberal Alliance. All UK general elections use first-past-the-post voting.

The party's best result was at the 2005 general election, when it won 8 of 74 seats in London. The London Liberal Democrats won 6 of 75 seats at the most recent general election in 2024.

Election	Leader	Votes			Seats		Status
Election	Leader	No.	%	±	No.	±	Status
1966	Jo Grimond	356,925	9.3	▼3.1	1 / 102	Steady	Opposition
1970	Jeremy Thorpe	246,060	6.9	▼2.4	0 / 102	▼1	Opposition
Feb-1974	Jeremy Thorpe	814,239	20.8	▲13.8	0 / 92	Steady	Opposition
Oct-1974	Jeremy Thorpe	594,699	17.0	▼3.8	0 / 92	Steady	Opposition
1979	David Steel	437,521	11.9	▼5.1	0 / 92	Steady	Opposition
1983	Roy Jenkins and David Steel	853,360	24.7	▲12.8	2 / 84	▲2	Opposition
1987	David Owen and David Steel	770,117	21.3	▼3.4	3 / 84	▲1	Opposition
1992	Paddy Ashdown	542,733	15.1	▼6.2	1 / 84	▼2	Opposition
1997	Paddy Ashdown	486,013	14.6	▼0.5	6 / 74	▲5	Opposition
2001	Charles Kennedy	482,888	17.5	▲2.9	6 / 74	Steady	Opposition
2005	Charles Kennedy	638,333	21.9	▲4.4	8 / 74	▲2	Opposition
2010	Nick Clegg	751,561	22.1	▲0.2	7 / 73	▼1	Cons–LD
2015	Nick Clegg	272,544	7.7	▼14.4	1 / 73	▼6	Opposition
2017	Tim Farron	336,725	8.8	▲1.1	3 / 73	▲2	Opposition
2019	Jo Swinson	562,564	14.9	▲6.1	3 / 73	Steady	Opposition
2024	Ed Davey	367,424	11.0	▼3.9	6 / 75	▲3	Opposition

=== European Parliament elections ===
Gold indicates the boroughs won by the London Liberal Democrats at the 2019 European Parliament election.

During the United Kingdom's membership of the European Union (1973–2020), Greater London participated in European Parliament elections, held every five years from 1979 until 2019. The table below shows London Liberal Democrat results in elections to the European Parliament. Results in 1979 are for the Liberal Party, while results in 1984 are for the SDP–Liberal Alliance. From 1979 to 1994, London members of the European Parliament (MEPs) were elected from ten individual constituencies by first-past-the-post voting; from 1999 to 2019, MEPs were elected from a London-wide regional list by proportional representation. The party's best result was at the final election in 2019, when it won 3 of 8 seats in London.

Election	Leader	Votes			Seats		Pos.
Election	Leader	No.	%	±	No.	±	Pos.
1979	David Steel	175,945	11.4	N/A	0 / 10	N/A	3rd
1984	David Owen and David Steel	302,427	18.1	▲6.7	0 / 10	Steady	3rd
1989	Paddy Ashdown	98,255	5.3	▼12.9	0 / 10	Steady	▼4th
1994	Paddy Ashdown	199,017	12.1	▲6.9	0 / 10	Steady	▲3rd
1999	Paddy Ashdown	133,058	11.7	▼0.5	1 / 10	▲1	3rd
2004	Charles Kennedy	288,790	15.3	▲3.6	1 / 9	Steady	3rd
2009	Nick Clegg	240,156	13.7	▼1.6	1 / 8	Steady	3rd
2014	Nick Clegg	148,013	6.7	▼7.0	0 / 8	▼1	▼5th
2019	Vince Cable	608,725	27.2	▲20.5	3 / 8	▲3	▲1st

=== Regional elections ===
==== Greater London Council elections ====
The table below shows the results obtained by the London Liberal Party in elections to the Greater London Council (GLC). The GLC was the top-tier local government administrative body for Greater London from 1965 to 1986. It replaced the earlier London County Council which had covered a much smaller area. The GLC was dissolved in 1986 by the Local Government Act 1985 and its powers were devolved to the London boroughs and other entities. All GLC elections were conducted under the first-past-the-post voting system. The party's best result was at the 1973 GLC election, when it won 2 of 92 seats.

Election	Leader	Votes			Seats		Status
Election	Leader	No.	%	±	No.	±	Status
1964		238,967	10.0	N/A	0 / 100	N/A	No seats
1967		189,868	8.8	▼1.2	0 / 100	Steady	No seats
1970		103,838	5.4	▼3.4	0 / 100	Steady	No seats
1973	Stanley Rundle	244,703	12.5	▲7.1	2 / 92	▲2	Opposition
1977		174,405	7.8	▼4.7	0 / 92	▼2	No seats
1981	Adrian Slade	323,856	14.4	▲6.6	1 / 92	▲1	Opposition

==== London Assembly elections ====
Gold indicates constituencies won by the London Liberal Democrats at the 2024 London Assembly election. The party won one constituency and one London-wide party list seat, for a total of two seats.

The table below shows the London Liberal Democrats results at London Assembly elections since the Greater London Authority was established in 2000. Assembly elections use the additional member system, a form of mixed member proportional representation, with 14 directly elected constituencies and 11 London-wide top-up seats.

The party's best result was at the 2004 London Assembly election, when it won 5 of 25 seats. The London Liberal Democrats won 2 of 25 seats at the most recent London Assembly election in 2024, including the first constituency seat ever won by a party other than Labour or the Conservatives (South West).

Election	Leader	Constituency			Party			Total Seats	±
Election	Leader	No.	%	Seats	No.	%	Seats	Total Seats	±
2000	Graham Tope	299,998	18.9	0 / 14	245,555	14.8	4 / 11	4 / 25	N/A
2004	Graham Tope	332,237	18.4	0 / 14	316,218	16.9	5 / 11	5 / 25	▲1
2008	Mike Tuffrey	330,018	13.7	0 / 14	252,556	11.2	3 / 11	3 / 25	▼2
2012	Caroline Pidgeon	193,842	8.8	0 / 14	150,447	6.8	2 / 11	2 / 25	▼1
2016	Caroline Pidgeon	195,820	7.5	0 / 14	165,580	6.3	1 / 11	1 / 25	▼1
2021	Caroline Pidgeon	266,595	10.3	0 / 14	189,522	7.3	2 / 11	2 / 25	▲1
2024	Hina Bokhari	271,049	11.0	1 / 14	215,682	8.7	1 / 11	2 / 25	Steady

==== London Mayoral elections ====
The London Liberal Democrats won no London Assembly constituencies at the 2024 London mayoral election. Gold on the inset map indicates constituencies where the London Liberal Democrats placed third.

The table below shows the London Liberal Democrats results in London Mayoral elections since the Greater London Authority was established in 2000. Elections between 2000 and 2021 were conducted using the supplementary vote system, which allowed voters to transfer votes from first to second preference candidates. The 2024 election used the first-past-the-post system.

The London Liberal Democrats have never won a London mayoral election. The party's best result was at the 2004 London mayoral election, when it won 15.3% of the first preference vote. The party won 5.8% of the vote at the most recent election in 2024.

Election	Candidate	1st Round			2nd Round			Result
Election	Candidate	No.	%	±	No.	%	±	Result
2000	Susan Kramer	203,452	11.9	N/A	Eliminated			Lost
2004	Simon Hughes	284,647	15.3	▲3.5	Eliminated			Lost
2008	Brian Paddick	235,585	9.8	▼5.6	Eliminated			Lost
2012	Brian Paddick	91,774	4.2	▼5.6	Eliminated			Lost
2016	Caroline Pidgeon	120,005	4.6	▲0.4	Eliminated			Lost
2021	Luisa Porritt	111,716	4.4	▼0.2	Eliminated			Lost
2024	Rob Blackie	145,184	5.8	▲1.4				Lost

=== Local elections ===
Orange indicates the boroughs won by the London Liberal Democrats at the 2026 London local elections.

The table below shows the London Liberal Democrats results at London borough council elections since the London Government Act 1963 created the administrative area of Greater London in 1965. Results between 1964 and 1978 are for the Liberal Party, while results between 1982 and 1986 are for the SDP–Liberal Alliance. All borough council elections use the first-past-the-post voting system.

The party's best result was at the 2006 London local elections when it won 316 of 1,861 seats and control of 3 of 32 boroughs. The London Liberal Democrats won 243 seats and control of 3 boroughs at the most recent elections in 2026.

Election	Leader	Votes			Councillors		Councils	
Election	Leader	No.	%	±	Seats	±	Majorities	±
1964	Jo Grimond			N/A	16 / 1,859	N/A	0 / 32	N/A
1968	Jeremy Thorpe	387,181	7.3		10 / 1,863	▼6	0 / 32	Steady
1971	Jeremy Thorpe	253,255	4.2	▼3.0	9 / 1,863	▼1	0 / 32	Steady
1974	Jeremy Thorpe	244,725	13.1	▲8.9	27 / 1,867	▲18	0 / 32	Steady
1978	David Steel	150,298	7.1	▼6.0	30 / 1,908	▲3	0 / 32	Steady
1982	Collective SDP Leadership and David Steel	530,340	24.6	▲17.5	124 / 1,914	▲94	0 / 32	Steady
1986	David Owen and David Steel	539,848	24.0	▼0.6	249 / 1,914	▲125	3 / 32	▲3
1990	Paddy Ashdown	344,125	14.2	▼9.8	229 / 1,914	▼20	3 / 32	Steady
1994	Paddy Ashdown	490,259	22.0	▲7.8	323 / 1,917	▲94	3 / 32	Steady
1998	Paddy Ashdown	362,913	20.8	▼1.2	301 / 1,917	▼22	2 / 32	▼1
2002	Charles Kennedy	353,833	20.6	▼0.2	307 / 1,861	▲6	3 / 32	▲1
2006	Menzies Campbell	443,772	20.7	▲0.1	316 / 1,861	▲9	3 / 32	Steady
2010	Nick Clegg	835,217	22.4	▲1.7	246 / 1,861	▼70	2 / 32	▼1
2014	Nick Clegg	267,769	10.6	▼11.8	116 / 1,861	▼130	1 / 32	▼1
2018	Vince Cable	323,074	13.0	▲2.5	152 / 1,861	▲36	3 / 32	▲2
2022	Ed Davey	335,415	13.7	▲0.7	180 / 1,817	▲28	3 / 32	Steady
2026	Ed Davey		12.4	▼1.3	243 / 1,817	▲63	3 / 32	Steady

The table below shows the London Liberal Democrats' best election results for each London borough council, as well as the party's current seat totals.

Best historic result by borough
Borough	Election	Best seats	Role in council	Current seats
Barking and Dagenham	1986	5 / 48	Opposition	0 / 51
Barnet	1964	6 / 63	3rd Party	0 / 63
Bexley	1994	14 / 62	3rd Party	0 / 45
Brent	2006	27 / 63	Joint control with Conservatives	11 / 57
Bromley	1998	27 / 60	Joint control with Labour	6 / 58
Camden	2006	20 / 54	Joint control with Conservatives	10 / 55
Croydon	2026	2 / 70	3rd Party	2 / 70
Ealing	2026	13 / 70	Opposition	13 / 70
Enfield	1974	1 / 60	3rd Party	0 / 63
Greenwich	1986	5 / 62	3rd Party	0 / 55
Hackney	1998	17 / 60	3rd Party	0 / 57
Hammersmith and Fulham	1982	2 / 50	3rd Party	0 / 50
Haringey	2006	27 / 57	Opposition	8 / 57
Harrow	1994	29 / 63	Minority	0 / 55
Havering	1990	6 / 63	4th Party	0 / 55
Hillingdon	1986	6 / 63	3rd Party	0 / 53
Hounslow	1994	5 / 60	3rd Party	1 / 62
Islington	2002	38 / 48	Overall control	0 / 51
Kensington and Chelsea	2026	3 / 50	3rd Party	3 / 50
Kingston upon Thames	2022	44 / 48	Overall control	44 / 48
Lambeth	2002	28 / 63	Joint control with Conservatives	9 / 63
Lewisham	2002	17 / 54	Opposition	0 / 54
Merton	2026	19 / 57	Opposition	19 / 57
Newham	1982	6 / 60	Opposition	0 / 66
Redbridge	2006	9 / 62	Opposition	0 / 63
Richmond upon Thames	2026	54 / 54	Overall control	54 / 54
Southwark	2002	30 / 63	Joint control with Conservatives	12 / 63
Sutton	2026	51 / 55	Overall control	51 / 55
Tower Hamlets	1990	30 / 50	Overall control	1 / 45
Waltham Forest	2006	19 / 60	Opposition	0 / 60
Wandsworth	1982	1 / 61	3rd Party	0 / 58
Westminster City	2010	0 / 61	No presence	0 / 54

== See also ==
- English Liberal Democrats
