= London Labour =

- Mayor of London: Sadiq Khan
- Chair: Maggi Ferncombe
- London Assembly Group Leader: Len Duvall
- House of Commons Group Chair: Dawn Butler
- Headquarters: Southside, 105 Victoria Street; London; SW1E 6QT
- Ideology: Social democracy
- Political position: Centre-left
- National affiliation: Labour Party
- European affiliation: Party of European Socialists
- International affiliation: Progressive Alliance; Socialist International (observer)
- Affiliate party: Co-operative Party (Labour and Co-operative Party)
- Colours: Red
- House of Commons (London seats): 59 / 75
- London Assembly: 11 / 25
- Court of Common Council: 6 / 100
- Councillors: 696 / 1,817
- Council control: 9 / 32
- Directly elected mayors: 1 / 5

Website
- labourinlondon.org.uk

London Labour is the devolved, regional part of the Labour Party in Greater London. It is the largest political party in London, currently holding a majority of the executive mayoralties, a majority of local councils, council seats and parliamentary seats, and a plurality of assembly seats.

== Current representatives ==
=== Members of Parliament ===
==== Cabinet ====
- Wes Streeting – Secretary of State for Defence
- Miatta Fahnbulleh – Secretary of State for Energy Security and Net Zero

=== Greater London Authority ===
==== Mayor of London ====
Sadiq Khan, of the Labour Party, is Mayor of London.

==== London Assembly Members ====
AM	Constituency	First elected	Majority	Majority %
Marina Ahmad	Lambeth and Southwark	2021	49,624	28.5
Elly Baker	Additional member	2021	N/A	N/A
Anne Clarke	Barnet and Camden	2021	19,143	11.8
Leonie Cooper	Merton and Wandsworth	2016	27,423	15.5
Unmesh Desai	City and East	2016	70,487	36.4
Len Duvall (Leader)	Greenwich and Lewisham	2000	51,807	32.1
Krupesh Hirani	Brent and Harrow	2021	8,828	5.6
Bassam Mahfouz	Ealing and Hillingdon	2024	4,861	2.5
Joanne McCartney	Enfield and Haringey	2004	46,102	28.1
Sem Moema	North East	2021	59,746	28.8
James Small-Edwards	West Central	2024	4,253	3.5

=== Councillors ===
Council	Councillors
Barking and Dagenham	38 / 51
Barnet	31 / 63
Bexley	9 / 45
Brent	26 / 59
Bromley	8 / 59
Camden	30 / 55
Croydon	30 / 71
Ealing	46 / 70
Enfield	27 / 63
Greenwich	35 / 55
Hackney	9 / 57
Hammersmith and Fulham	38 / 50
Haringey	21 / 57
Harrow	12 / 55
Havering	8 / 55
Hillingdon	16 / 65
Hounslow	32 / 60
Islington	32 / 51
Kensington and Chelsea	13 / 50
Kingston upon Thames	0 / 48
Lambeth	26 / 63
Lewisham	14 / 54
Merton	32 / 57
Newham	26 / 66
Redbridge	43 / 63
Richmond upon Thames	0 / 54
Southwark	29 / 63
Sutton	1 / 54
Tower Hamlets	5 / 45
Waltham Forest	15 / 60
Wandsworth	28 / 58
Westminster	22 / 54

=== Common Councilmen ===
Labour is the only political party to have any seats in the City of London Corporation's Court of Common Council.

Common Councilman	Ward
Anne Corbett	Cripplegate
Helen Lesley Fentiman	Aldersgate
Sarah Helen Gillinson	Cripplegate
Stephen Goodman	Aldersgate
Mercy Haggerty	Cripplegate
Sandra Jenner	Aldersgate
Jacqueline Roberts Webster	Cripplegate

=== Directly elected local authority mayors ===
Mayoralty	Mayor
Newham	Forhad Hussain

== Electoral performance ==
=== UK Parliament elections ===
Red indicates the constituencies won by Labour at the 2024 general election.

The table below shows the London Labour Party's results at UK general elections since the area of Greater London was created.

Date	Votes won	% of Votes	Change	MPs elected	Change
Feb 1974	1,587,065	40.4%	▼5.3%	50 / 92	▼5
Oct 1974	1,540,462	43.9%	▲3.5%	51 / 92	▲1
1979	1,459,085	39.6%	▼4.3%	42 / 92	▼9
1983	1,031,539	29.8%	▼9.8%	26 / 84	▼16
1987	1,136,903	31.5%	▲1.7%	23 / 84	▼3
1992	1,332,424	37.1%	▲5.6%	35 / 84	▲12
1997	1,643,329	49.5%	▲12.4%	57 / 74	▲22
2001	1,306,869	47.3%	▼2.2%	55 / 74	▼2
2005	1,135,687	38.9%	▼8.4%	44 / 74	▼11
2010	1,245,637	36.6%	▼2.3%	38 / 73	▼6
2015	1,545,080	43.7%	▲7.1%	45 / 73	▲7
2017	2,087,010	54.6%	▲10.9%	49 / 73	▲4
2019	1,810,810	48.1%	▼6.5%	49 / 73	Steady
2024	1,432,622	43.0%	▼5.1%	59 / 75	▲10

=== European Parliament elections ===
Red indicates the boroughs won by London Labour at the 2019 European Parliament election.

During the United Kingdom's membership of the European Union (1973–2020), Greater London participated in European Parliament elections, held every five years from 1979 until 2019. The table below shows the London Labour results in elections to the European Parliament. From 1979 to 1994, London members of the European Parliament (MEPs) were elected from ten individual constituencies by first-past-the-post voting; from 1999 to 2019, MEPs were elected from a London-wide regional list by proportional representation.

Election	Leader	Votes			Seats		Pos.
Election	Leader	No.	%	±	No.	±	Pos.
1979	Jim Callaghan	566,525	36.7	N/A	1 / 10	N/A	2nd
1984	Neil Kinnock	683,789	41.0	▲4.3	5 / 10	▲4	▲1st
1989	Neil Kinnock	778,589	41.6	▲0.6	7 / 10	▲2	1st
1994	Margaret Beckett	826,047	50.3	▲8.7	9 / 10	▲2	1st
1999	Tony Blair	399,466	35.0	▼15.3	4 / 10	▼5	1st
2004	Tony Blair	466,584	24.8	▼10.3	3 / 9	▼1	▼2nd
2009	Gordon Brown	372,590	21.3	▼3.5	2 / 8	▼1	2nd
2014	Ed Miliband	806,959	36.7	▲15.4	4 / 8	▲2	▲1st
2019	Jeremy Corbyn	536,810	23.9	▼12.7	2 / 8	▼2	▼2nd

=== Regional elections ===
==== Greater London Council elections ====
The table below shows the results obtained by London Labour in elections to the Greater London Council (GLC). The GLC was the top-tier local government administrative body for Greater London from 1965 to 1986. It replaced the earlier London County Council which had covered a much smaller area. The GLC was dissolved in 1986 by the Local Government Act 1985 and its powers were devolved to the London boroughs and other entities. All GLC elections were conducted under the first-past-the-post voting system.

The party's best result was at the 1964 GLC election, when it won 64 of 100 seats.

Election	Leader	Votes			Seats		Status
Election	Leader	No.	%	±	No.	±	Status
1964	Bill Fiske	1,063,390	44.6	N/A	64 / 100	N/A	Majority
1967	Bill Fiske	732,669	34.0	▼10.6	18 / 100	▼46	Opposition
1970	Reg Goodwin	766,272	39.9	▲5.9	35 / 100	▲17	Opposition
1973	Reg Goodwin	928,034	47.4	▲7.5	58 / 92	▲23	Majority
1977	Reg Goodwin	737,194	32.9	▼14.5	28 / 92	▼30	Opposition
1981	Andrew McIntosh	939,457	41.8	▲8.9	50 / 92	▲22	Majority

==== 1986 Inner London Education Authority election ====
In the 1986 Inner London Education Authority election, there were 58 candidates and 45 of them were successful at the election. The Labour Party received 664,520 votes, 47.2% of the total number of votes.

==== London Assembly elections ====
Red indicates constituencies won by London Labour at the 2024 London Assembly election. The party won ten constituencies and one London-wide party list seat, for a total of eleven seats.

The table below shows the London Labour results at London Assembly elections since the Greater London Authority was established in 2000. Assembly elections use the additional member system, a form of mixed member proportional representation, with 14 directly elected constituencies and 11 London-wide top-up seats.

The party's best results were at the 2012 and 2016 London Assembly elections, when it won 12 of 25 seats. London Labour won 11 of 25 seats at the most recent London Assembly election in 2024.

Election	Leader	Constituency			Party			Total Seats	±
Election	Leader	No.	%	Seats	No.	%	Seats	Total Seats	±
2000	Toby Harris	501,296	31.6%	6 / 14	502,874	30.3%	3 / 11	9 / 25	N/A
2004	Toby Harris	444,808	24.7%	5 / 14	468,247	25.0%	2 / 11	7 / 25	▼2
2008	Len Duvall	673,855	28.0%	6 / 14	665,443	27.1%	2 / 11	8 / 25	▲1
2012	Len Duvall	933,438	42.3%	8 / 14	911,204	41.1%	4 / 11	12 / 25	▲4
2016	Len Duvall	1,138,576	43.5%	9 / 14	1,054,801	40.3%	3 / 11	12 / 25	Steady
2021	Len Duvall	1,083,215	41.7%	9 / 14	986,609	38.1%	2 / 11	11 / 25	▼1
2024	Len Duvall	983,216	39.7%	10 / 14	951,056	38.4%	1 / 11	11 / 25	Steady

==== London Mayoral elections ====
Red indicates London Assembly constituencies won by London Labour at the 2024 London mayoral election.

The table below shows the London Labour results in London Mayoral elections since the Greater London Authority was established in 2000. Elections between 2000 and 2021 were conducted using the supplementary vote system, which allowed voters to transfer votes from first to second preference candidates. The 2024 election used the first-past-the-post system.

London Labour have won four London mayoral elections: 2004, 2016, 2021, and 2024. London Labour's best result was at the 2016 election when Sadiq Khan won 56.8% of the vote including transfers. The party won 43.8% of the vote at the most recent election in 2024.

Election	Candidate	1st Round			2nd Round			Result
Election	Candidate	No.	%	±	No.	%	±	Result
2000	Frank Dobson	223,884	13.1	N/A	Eliminated			Lost
2004	Ken Livingstone	685,548	36.8	▲23.7	828,390	55.4	N/A	Won
2008	Ken Livingstone	894,317	37.0	▲0.2	1,029,406	46.8	▼8.6	Lost
2012	Ken Livingstone	889,918	40.3	▲3.3	992,273	48.5	▲1.6	Lost
2016	Sadiq Khan	1,148,716	44.2	▲3.9	1,310,143	56.8	▲8.4	Won
2021	Sadiq Khan	1,013,721	40.0	▼4.2	1,206,034	55.2	▼1.6	Won
2024	Sadiq Khan	1,088,225	43.8	▲3.8				Won

=== Local elections ===
The table below shows the London Labour results at London borough council elections since the London Government Act 1963 created the administrative area of Greater London in 1965. All borough council elections use the first-past-the-post voting system.

The party's best result was at the 1971 London local elections when it won 1,221 of 1,863 seats and overall control of 21 of 32 boroughs. London Labour won 696 seats and overall control of 9 boroughs at the most recent elections in 2026.

Election	Leader	Votes		Councillors		Councils	
Election	Leader	%	±	Seats	±	Majorities	±
1964	Harold Wilson		N/A	1,112 / 1,859	N/A	20 / 32	N/A
1968	Harold Wilson	28.1	N/A	350 / 1,863	▼762	3 / 32	▼17
1971	Harold Wilson	53.1	▲25.0	1,221 / 1,863	▲871	21 / 32	▲18
1974	Harold Wilson	42.9	▼10.2	1,090 / 1,867	▼131	18 / 32	▼3
1978	James Callaghan	39.6	▼3.3	882 / 1,908	▼208	14 / 32	▼4
1982	Michael Foot	30.4	▼9.3	781 / 1,914	▼101	12 / 32	▼2
1986	Neil Kinnock	38.0	▲7.7	957 / 1,914	▲176	15 / 32	▲3
1990	Neil Kinnock	40.8	▲2.8	925 / 1,914	▼32	14 / 32	▼1
1994	John Smith	42.9	▲2.1	1,044 / 1,917	▲119	17 / 32	▲3
1998	Tony Blair	42.2	▼0.6	1,050 / 1,917	▲6	18 / 32	▲1
2002	Tony Blair	36.1	▼6.2	866 / 1,861	▼184	15 / 32	▼3
2006	Tony Blair	30.1	▼6.0	685 / 1,861	▼181	7 / 32	▼8
2010	Gordon Brown	35.1	▲5.0	875 / 1,861	▲190	17 / 32	▲10
2014	Ed Miliband	43.0	▲8.0	1,060 / 1,851	▲185	20 / 32	▲3
2018	Jeremy Corbyn	47.0	▲4.0	1,120 / 1,851	▲60	21 / 32	▲1
2022	Keir Starmer	42.2	▼4.8	1,173 / 1,817	▲45	21 / 32	Steady
2026	Keir Starmer	25.6	▼16.9	696 / 1,817	▼459	9 / 32	▼12

== See also ==
- English Labour Network
- London Conservatives
- London Green Party
- London Liberal Democrats
