= 1982 London local elections =

- 6 May 1982

All 1,914 on all 32 London boroughs
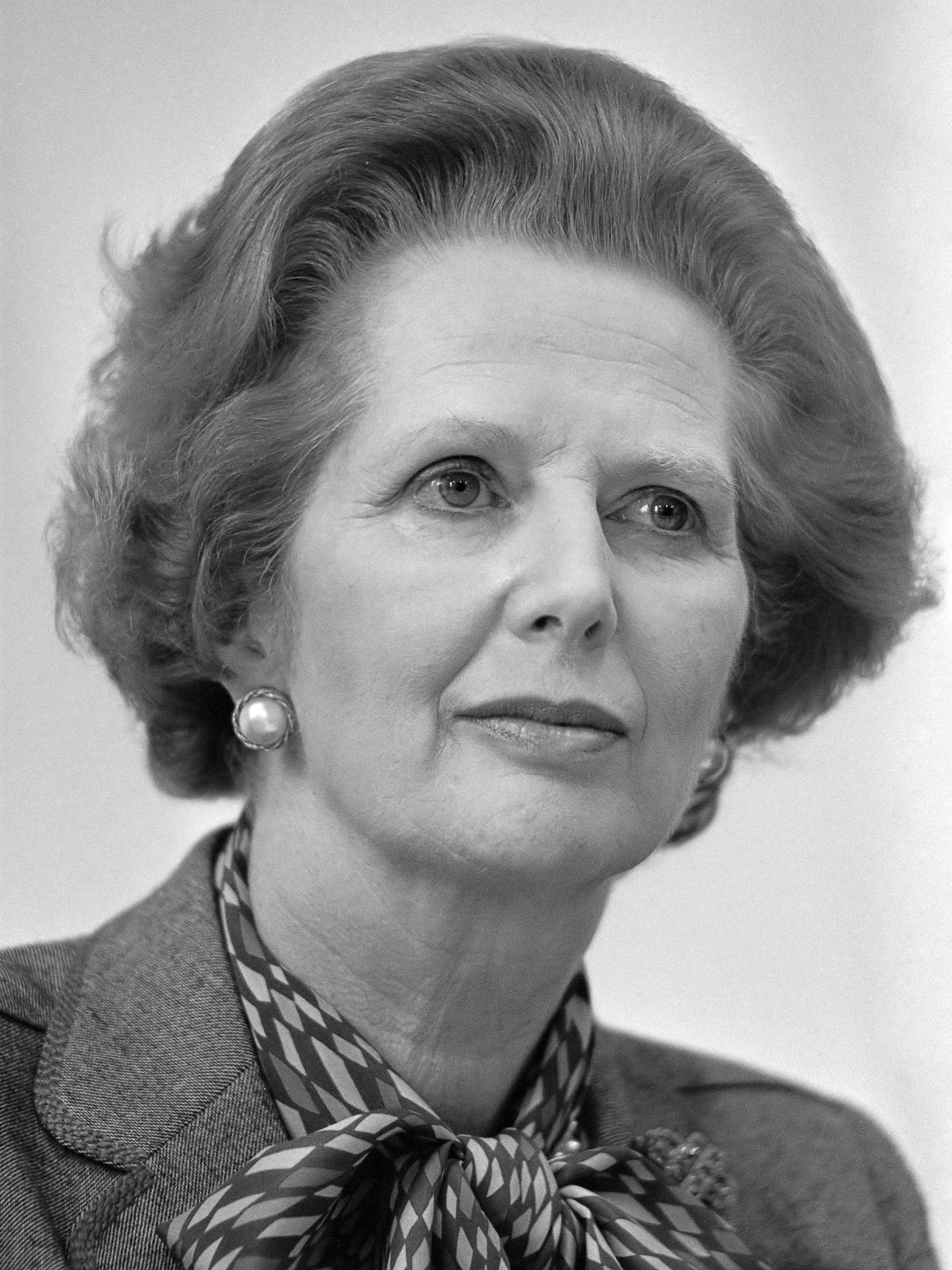

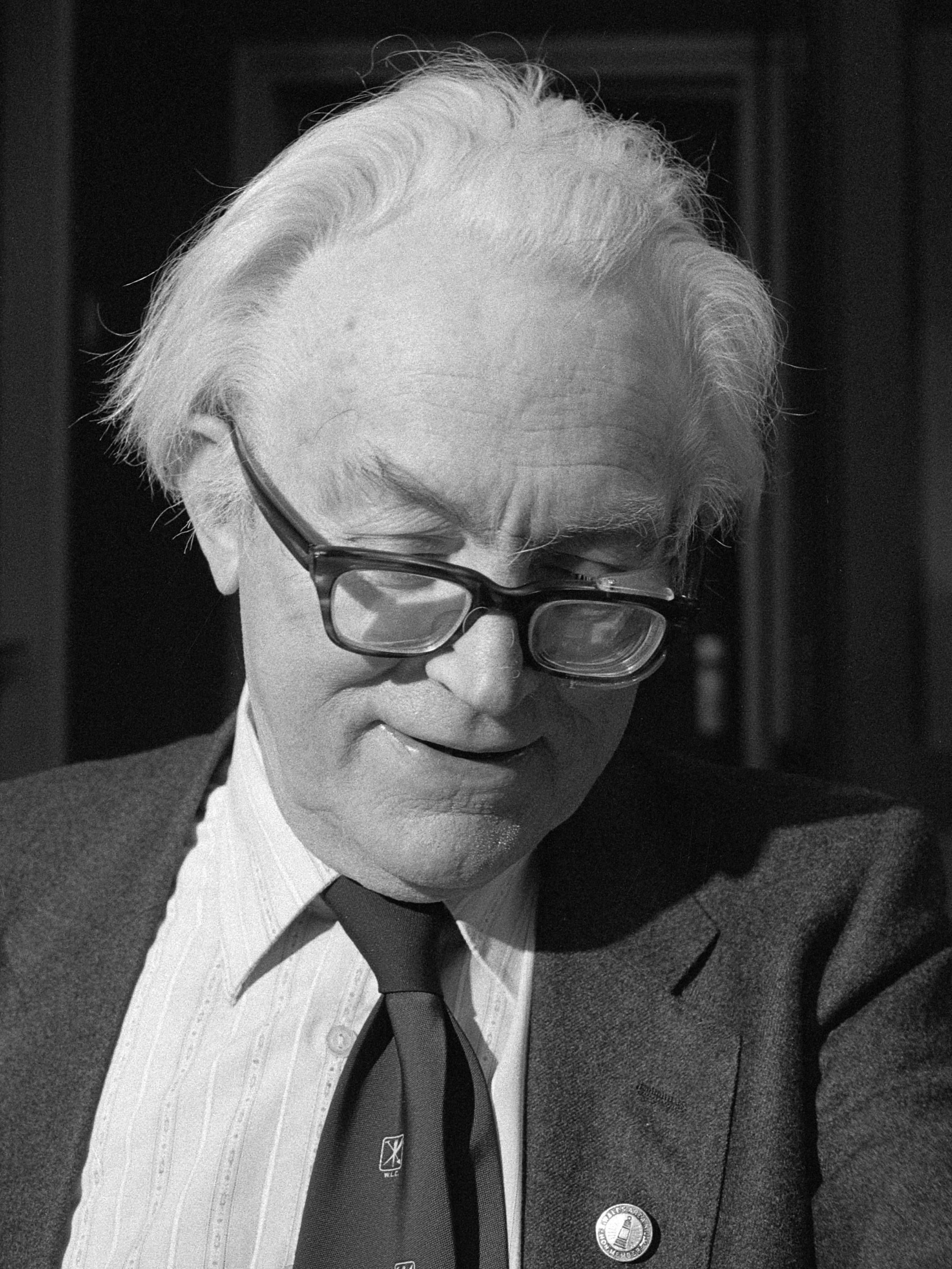
	First party	Second party	Third party
Leader	Margaret Thatcher	Michael Foot	David Steel (Lib.); Collective (SDP)
Party	Conservative	Labour	SDP–Liberal Alliance
Leader since	11 February 1975	10 November 1980	1976 (Steel), 1981 (SDP)
Popular vote	912,005	652,430	530,340
Percentage	42.2%	30.2%	24.6%
Swing	▼6.5%	▼8.9%	▲17.5%
Councils	17	12	0
Councils +/–	Steady	▼2	Steady
Councillors	984	781	124
Councillors +/–	▲24	▼101	▲94
- Results by Borough in 1982.

Local government elections took place in London, and some other parts of the United Kingdom on Thursday 6 May 1982. Ward changes took place in Enfield which increased the total number of councillors by 6 from 1,908 to 1,914.

All London borough council seats were up for election. Both major parties lost votes to the SDP-Liberal Alliance, but whilst the Conservatives gained 20 council seats, Labour lost 101.

The party's result of 30.4%, 12 councils and 781 councillors was the worst Labour result since 1968.

The previous Borough elections in London were in 1978.

To date, this remains the last London local election in which the Conservatives won a majority of council seats or councils, as well as the last time the party won over 40% of the vote. The Conservatives would not win the popular vote in a London local election for another two decades, and would not win a plurality of seats in London again until the election of 2006, 24 years later.

== Results summary ==
Party	Votes won	% votes	Change	Seats	% seats	Change	Councils	Change
Conservative	912,005	42.2	-6.5	984	51.4	+24	17	±0
Labour	652,430	30.2	-8.9	781	40.8	-101	12	-2
Alliance	530,340	24.6	+17.5	124	6.5	+94	0	±0
Others	64,387	3.0	-2.1	25	1.3	-11	0	±0
No overall control	n/a	n/a	n/a	n/a	n/a	n/a	3	+2

- Turnout: 2,233,386 voters cast ballots.

== Council results ==
Council	Previous control	Result	Details
Barking and Dagenham	Labour	Labour	Details
Barnet	Conservative	Conservative	Details
Bexley	Conservative	Conservative	Details
Brent	Labour	Labour	Details
Bromley	Conservative	Conservative	Details
Camden	Labour	Labour	Details
Croydon	Conservative	Conservative	Details
Ealing	Conservative	Conservative	Details
Enfield	Conservative	Conservative	Details
Greenwich	Labour	Labour	Details
Hackney	Labour	Labour	Details
Hammersmith and Fulham	No overall control	No overall control	Details
Haringey	Labour	Labour	Details
Harrow	Conservative	Conservative	Details
Havering	Conservative	Conservative	Details
Hillingdon	Conservative	Conservative	Details
Hounslow	Labour	Labour	Details
Islington	Labour	Labour	Details
Kensington and Chelsea	Conservative	Conservative	Details
Kingston upon Thames	Conservative	Conservative	Details
Lambeth	Labour	No overall control	Details
Lewisham	Labour	Labour	Details
Merton	Conservative	Conservative	Details
Newham	Labour	Labour	Details
Redbridge	Conservative	Conservative	Details
Richmond upon Thames	Conservative	Conservative	Details
Southwark	Labour	Labour	Details
Sutton	Conservative	Conservative	Details
Tower Hamlets	Labour	Labour	Details
Waltham Forest	Labour	No overall control	Details
Wandsworth	Conservative	Conservative	Details
Westminster	Conservative	Conservative	Details

== Borough result maps ==
Barnet 1982 results map

Camden 1982 results map

Croydon 1982 results map

Hammersmith and Fulham 1982 results map
