= Harris Bokhari =

Charity worker

- Awards: Diversity Champion of the Year Award 2018.

Harris Bokhari OBE is the founder and a trustee at the Patchwork Foundation, for which he won the Diversity Champion of the Year Award in early 2018. The Patchwork Foundation promotes the positive integration of disadvantaged and minority communities into British democracy and civil society."

Bokhari is a Diversity Champion and is a member of the Equality, Diversity and Inclusion (EDI) Advisory Group, which will shape, influence and guide the delivery of the Mayor of London's Equality, Diversity and Inclusion Strategy. He is also an independent member of the "Community and Voluntary Service" of the Honours Committee and is credited to help increase diverse representation for the awards. Bokhari is a member of the National Assessment Committee of the Queen's Award for Voluntary Service, which plays a key role in the awards process.

Conservative Party campaign strategist Sir Lynton Crosby, who is a patron of Patchwork, described Bokhari as "Captain Networker".

Bokhari was appointed by the Prime Minister on 11 May 2020 as a trustee of the Natural History Museum, making him one of only three Muslim trustees in major British museums, and currently the only British-born Muslim.

On 10 July 2023, it was announced that Bokhari was appointed chair of the National Citizen Service Trust for a 3 year term starting 12 July 2023.

== Early life ==
Bokhari grew up in Epsom, Surrey and was active in community events and helping people from a young age. He is of Pakistani descent. His Punjabi-born father was the first British Muslim to run a secondary school in the UK; he was headteacher of Ernest Bevin College and was awarded an OBE for services to education in the 2001 Birthday Honours. Liberal Democrat London Assembly Member Hina Bokhari is his older sister.

== Career ==
Bokhari graduated from Imperial College, London in 1999 with a BSc in Mathematics and was awarded their Distinguished Alumni Award 2020. Bokhari is a chartered accountant and is a tax and financial advisor. He has worked for PwC, KPMG and Baker Tilly, and is currently an Independent Financial Advisor.

He regularly writes for the Evening Standard, The Independent and Times Educational Supplement.

== Public service ==
=== Mosaic Network ===
Harris Bokhari was appointed as first honorary patron of The Prince's Trust Mosaic Network, where he is a National Advisory Board member. In 2013, he was among thirty-three philanthropists honoured by the Beacon Awards for collectively giving more than £100m to charitable causes. He was awarded the Beacon Award for Philanthropy Advocate for raising £1 million within 12 months for various charities working in deprived communities in the UK.

=== Naz Legacy Foundation ===
Bokhari is also founder of the Naz Legacy Foundation, which was established in honour of the legacy of his father, Naz Bokhari, the first Muslim secondary school head-teacher in Britain. The Naz Legacy Foundation received Prime Minister David Cameron's Big Society Award in 2014.

Bokhari's interfaith work has included organising the first ever engagement event between national community, women and youth leaders from the Jewish and Muslim communities meeting with the new Chief Rabbi in Finchley Kinloss Synagogue. He was one of the first Muslims to be invited to the Chief Rabbi's installation ceremony. He also organised the first youth interfaith iftar at Lambeth Palace, which brought together the Archbishop of Canterbury, Chief Rabbi, Mayor of London and over 100 youth leaders from each of London's boroughs.

== Muslim community activism ==
Bokhari was a spokesperson for the Muslim Association of Britain from 2006 to 2008.

In 2007, Bokhari was appointed press officer for the launch of Mosques and Imams National Advisory Board (MINAB), which was attended by the Communities Secretary Hazel Blears. Soon after the Government stopped working with many of these organisations, Bokhari had already moved on to other projects and initiatives outside of the Muslim communities.

=== Position on Israel and anti-Semitism ===
In 2002, Bokhari organised protests in London, attended by thousands of people "to express their solidarity with the Palestinians and against Israel's ongoing military operations in the West Bank."

In 2019, Bokhari organized the first inter-faith Iftar with the Chief Rabbi at St John's Wood synagogue. It resulted in a number of synagogues across London organising their own Iftars. Bokhari reportedly said: "We need to call out all forms of prejudice and racism in society and it is important we speak out against anti- semitism in the same way we have to speak out against Islamophobia."

=== Positions on UK foreign policy ===
In 2006 Bokhari told the Socialist Worker that in his opinion British foreign policy has long been a major concern, noting widespread opposition from diverse groups, not just Muslims. He emphasized that ignoring public frustration with foreign policy would be irresponsible, criticizing ministers for dismissing it as irrelevant."

When asked by the BBC in 2006 about teaching "core British values" in schools to combat extremism, Bokhari called it a reactionary measure. He argued that the root causes of extremism — such as the wars in Iraq and Afghanistan and the illegal occupation of Palestine — must be addressed to prevent further issues. Regarding the controversy over Danish cartoons of Muhammed, in 2006 Bokhari supported calls for a boycott of Western products, stressing the right to peaceful protest. He warned that the boycott could spread to other countries, such as Germany, where newspapers defended publishing the cartoons.

=== Position on Ahmadiyya community ===
In 2010, according to The New Yorker, Bokhari told a group of British Muslims in the Tooting constituency to vote for Labour Party candidate Sadiq Khan instead of Liberal Democrat candidate Nasser Butt, a member of the Ahmadiyya. "The majority of Muslims in this area are voting Lib Dem, because they think Nasser Butt is a Muslim," Bokhari told a room of Muslim voters as the reason why they should not vote for Butt. "You need to go into the community and take these posters down…. All you need to do is just look for Sadiq Khan, Labour Party, and just tick it… Whatever else you vote is up to you." Bokhari later told the author that he does not remember the meeting.

In 2017, Bokhari talked about his work with young people from minority faith communities who face prejudices, including youth in the Ahmadiyya community. In 2019, he wrote in The Independent and the Evening Standard calling out the prejudice and hatred towards the Ahmadiyya community.

In November 2019, Bokhari visited the Baitul Futuh Mosque and was welcomed by their Head of External Relations. They discussed their work in bringing communities together.

== Work on Countering Violent Extremism (CVE) ==
In July 2019, Bokhari, a grassroots expert in Countering Violent Extremism (CVE) was invited to attend the Home Secretary's speech, Confronting Extremism Together. Bokhari, who organised the Woolwich interfaith event following the murder of Lee Rigby in 2013, the Christchurch vigil at the Islamic Cultural Centre and memorial at New Zealand House in 2019, was invited by the US State Department on their International Visitor Leadership Programme on CVE in 2017. Bokhari launched the Youth Mentoring Program in Partnership with the Embassy of the United States, London in December 2019.

== Work during COVID-19 pandemic ==
Bokhari had been instrumental in getting Mosques closed during the crisis and was described as a leading campaigner to keep Muslims at home during Ramadan, by organising virtual iftars during 2020, which were attended by more than 75,000 people. Bokhari started the Naz Legacy iftars, which were launched by the Prince of Wales and attended by Archbishop of Canterbury Justin Welby, Cardinal Vincent Nichols, the Bishop of London Sarah Mullally and the Chief Rabbi Ephraim Mirvis.

== Accolades ==
Bokhari was awarded an OBE in the 2015 Birthday Honours, and was listed as an 'Equality Champion' in the Evening Standard's Progress 1000 list of most influential Londoners. He also won the Alija Izetbegovic Award for Good Citizenship from The Muslim News Awards in 2016.
