= National Citizen Service =

Youth development programme in England

National Citizen Service (NCS)
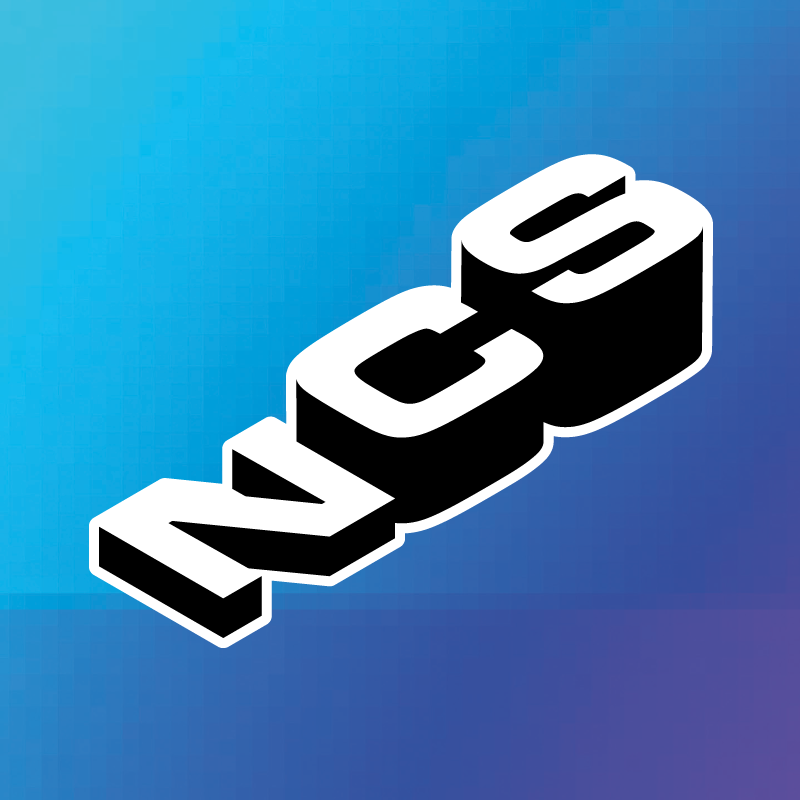
- Formation: 2011
- Defunct: 2025
- Type: Royal Charter
- Legal status: Trust
- CEO: Mark Gifford
- Chair of NCS Trust: Harris Bokhari OBE
- Website: https://wearencs.com/

National Citizen Service, also known as NCS, was a Government-funded personal and social development programme in England available for 16-17 year olds. The scheme was run by the NCS Trust, a public body for youth and a key component of the Government's National Youth Guarantee. Since being founded by David Cameron in 2009, NCS provided over one million away-from-home youth development activities to 16 and 17-year-olds. The scheme closed in March 2025, following an announcement from Culture Secretary Lisa Nandy in November 2024.

== History ==
The programme was designed and piloted in 2009 by social integration charity the Challenge. It was formally announced in 2010 by Prime Minister David Cameron as part of the Conservative–Liberal Democrat coalition government's Big Society initiative, and it was launched in 2011. When the scheme was launched critics expected it to be an unpopular and unsuccessful non-military version of national service. Subsequently, however, it achieved cross-party support in Parliament.

A pilot took place in Wales in 2014 and a report examining whether it duplicates or complements existing schemes was commissioned. Cameron urged the Welsh Government to consider taking up the scheme and offering it across Wales.

After the 2015 general election, the programme was continued under the Conservative government. In October 2016 Cameron, who had resigned as Prime Minister, became chairman of the NCS Trust's patrons' board. In the 2016 Queen's Speech it was announced that the scheme would be made permanent through the National Citizen Service Bill which was then introduced into the House of Lords by Lord Ashton of Hyde. The bill received Royal Assent in April 2017 and the resulting National Citizen Service Act created a statutory framework for the programme.

The scheme was made permanent through the National Citizen Service Act 2017. With cross-party support, NCS became a Royal Charter Body in 2018.

In 2019, NCS created a network of Management and Delivery Partners for the 16 and 17-year-olds who took part in NCS. A Youth Voice Forum was also introduced, which won the Youth Friendly Employer Awards for Youth Voice in 2021. In 2023 the Youth Voice Forum grew into the Youth Advisory Board with 12 paid members aged between 18 and 24.

During the Covid-19 pandemic, NCS provided digital programmes. However, setting the NCS up at arm’s length, because its users were likely to distrust a government programme, contributed to a lack of financial control in its early years. The Institute for Government concluded that governance arrangements must be prioritised when a public body is established, so they must be correct from the off; independence and accountability should be carefully calibrated and any legislation, in particular, should be sufficiently flexible so as not to require updating for many years.

In 2023–24, NCS provided away-from home youth development activities to 178,000 16 and 17-year-olds, through a supply chain of over 300 frontline youth organisations.

In November 2024, it was announced that the programme would be wound down as part of the Labour government's National Youth Strategy, with operations ceasing from March 27th 2025.

== Finances ==
The expenditure on the scheme in 2012 was estimated at £1,400 per individual and the scheme received almost half the Office for Civil Society's total budget in 2013. The numbers who took part in the scheme were 26,000 in 2012, 40,000 in 2013, 57,000 in 2014, 75,000 in 2015, 93,000 in 2016 and nearly 99,000 in 2017 meaning one in six eligible 16 and 17-year-olds participated.

In January 2017 the National Audit Office reported that NCS had "weaknesses" in governance and had "not prioritised cost control". It estimated that just 213,000 people would be participating in the programme in 2020–21, compared to a target of 360,000. The report suggested costs would have to be reduced by 29% in order to meet participation targets.

In March 2017 the Public Accounts Committee of the House of Commons said that the high cost of the scheme could not be justified and its participation targets remained challenging despite being significantly reduced. The total expenditure committed to the scheme by the government between 2011/12 and 2019/20 was £1.5 billion. £600 million of this had been spent by April 2017, with £900 million of the expenditure remaining. Research carried out in the spring of 2017 indicated that affluent individuals are less likely to attend university if they take part in NCS, while poorer individuals were likely to do so. At that time the cost per participant of NCS was £1,863.

In July 2018 the Minister for Sport and Civil Society Tracey Crouch said that in 2016 NCS had spent almost £10m on places which were never filled. In August 2018 the Local Government Association said that in 2016 the number of 16 and 17-year-olds taking part in NCS amounted to 12% of those eligible, and suggested that some of the money could be more effectively spent on local council youth services, spending on which fell from £650 million in 2010–11 to £390 million in 2016–17. Over the four years from 2014–15 to 2017–18 UK government spending on NCS was £634 million which accounted for 95% of all UK government spending on youth services.

In the four years from 2019 NCS funding dropped by 69%.

== Delivery ==
The programme was delivered through a number of Regional Delivery Partners (RDPs) and Local Delivery Partners (LDPs). The government had power to promote the scheme by sending letters to 16 and 17-year-olds when they turned 16 on behalf of the Trust. Current Regional Delivery Partners for NCS were listed on their Website, and have included APM, The EBP,English Football League Trust, Ingeus, Inspira, Inspired Education and the National Youth Agency.

A supply chain of over 100 organisations was involved in delivering NCS. Each RDP was responsible for its team of LDPs and their delivery.
