= Hina Bokhari =

British politician (born 1975)

Hina Bokhari OBE AM
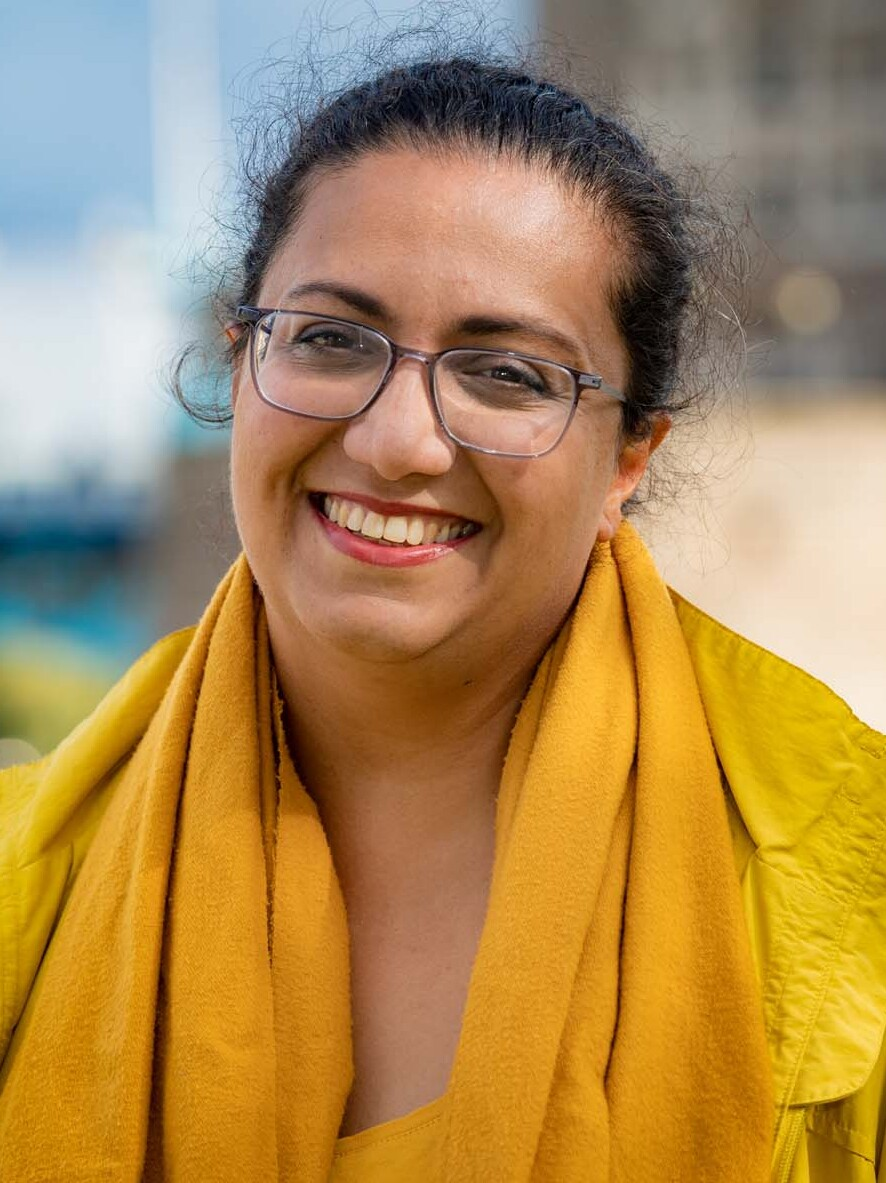

Leader of the Liberal Democrats in the London Assembly
- Incumbent
- Assumed office 9 May 2024
- Leader: Ed Davey
- Preceded by: Caroline Pidgeon

Member of the London Assembly as an additional member
- Incumbent
- Assumed office 6 May 2021

Councillor of London Borough of Merton for West Barnes
- Incumbent
- Assumed office 3 May 2018
- Preceded by: Brian Lewis-Lavender (Con)

Personal details
- Born: 10 August 1975 (age 51) Enfield, Greater London, England
- Party: Liberal Democrats
- Spouse: Martin Cooper (m. 2008)
- Children: 2

Hina Bokhari (born 10 August 1975) is a British politician and educator. A member of the Liberal Democrats, Bokhari has served as a Member of the London Assembly since the 2021 election.

In May 2024, she was elected to serve as Leader of the two-member Liberal Democrat group in the London Assembly.

== Early life and education ==
Born in Enfield, north London, she is the daughter of Nawazish "Naz" Bokhari and Rizwana Bokhari and is of Pakistani descent. Her Punjabi-born father Naz was the first British Muslim to run a secondary school in the UK; he was headteacher of Ernest Bevin College and was appointed OBE for services to education in the 2001 Birthday Honours. The Mayor of London Sadiq Khan was one of his students Hina's younger brother, Harris Bokhari, is a charity founder.

== Career ==
Prior to becoming politically active, Bokhari worked as a teacher for 20 years in London schools. She has also founded two youth focused charities, including the Naz Legacy Foundation.

=== Political career ===
Bokhari joined the Liberal Democrats in 2017, standing for election to Merton London Borough Council in 2018 and winning a seat in West Barnes ward, becoming the first Muslim woman elected in Merton. She was re-elected as a Councillor in 2022.

Bokhari was the Liberal Democrat candidate for the marginal Sutton and Cheam constituency in the 2019 general election. She finished second behind Conservative incumbent, Paul Scully, who won the seat with a majority of 8,351.

=== London Assembly ===
In 2018, she came fifth in the members ballot for the Liberal Democrat list for the 2020 London Assembly election (postponed until 2021 owing to the COVID-19 pandemic). However, she was promoted to second-place on the list because she was from an ethnic minority.

On 6 May 2021, Bokhari was elected as a Member of the London Assembly. She was the first Liberal Democrat to win a seat on the London Assembly since 2004. She was also one of the first Muslim women ever to be elected to the London Assembly alongside Marina Ahmad AM and Sakina Sheikh AM.

Upon taking up her seat on the London Assembly, Bokhari sits on the Environment Committee, Economy Committee, the Fire, Resilience and Emergency Planning (FREP) Committee and the Cost of Living Working Group. She served as the Chair of the Economy Committee from 2022 to 2023.

Hina Bokhari was re-selected in 2023 to run for the London Assembly again by the Liberal Democrats for the next London Assembly elections coming first in the members' ballot meaning she will top the list for the Party.

Having been re-elected in the 2024 London Assembly Election, Bokhari took over from Caroline Pidgeon as Group Leader of the Liberal Democrats on the Assembly. She now sits on the Fire Committee, Transport Committee, Economy Committee and Oversight Committee. She will chair the Fire Committee for the 2024-25 term.

== Political views ==
Bokhari has campaigned for improved building safety in London and action against fires caused by faulty E-bikes and E-scooters. She supports cleaner air, promoting cargo bikes to replace white vans and raising awareness about wood burning risks.

Bokhari criticized Sadiq Khan for backing air pollution reduction while supporting projects like the Silvertown Tunnel, which could worsen air quality in Newham. She also advocates for stronger measures to prevent sewage dumping in the River Thames and suggests giving London authorities more power to fine polluting water companies.

== Personal life ==
In 2008, Bokhari married Martin Cooper and the couple have two children, a son and daughter."

In the 2025 New Year Honours, Bokhari was appointed an Officer of the Order of the British Empire (OBE) for "services to Young People, to Charity and to Inter-Faith Relations".
