= 1990 London local elections =

- 3 May 1990

All 1,914 on all 32 London boroughs
- Turnout: 48.2% (▲2.7%)
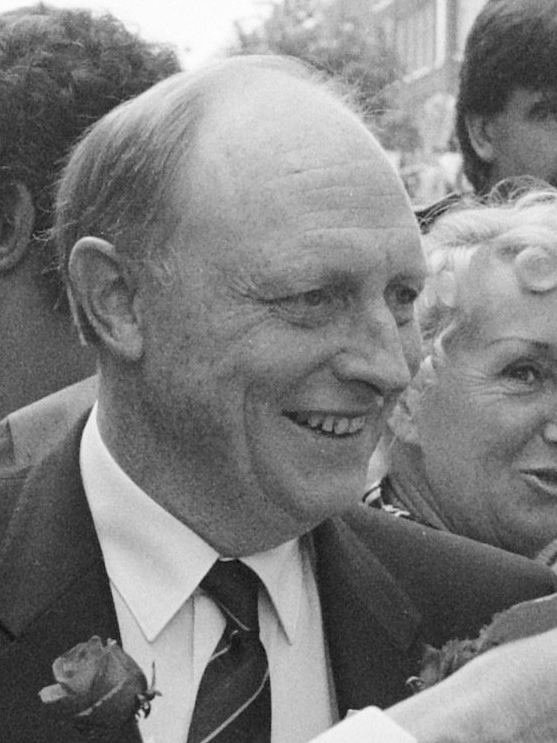

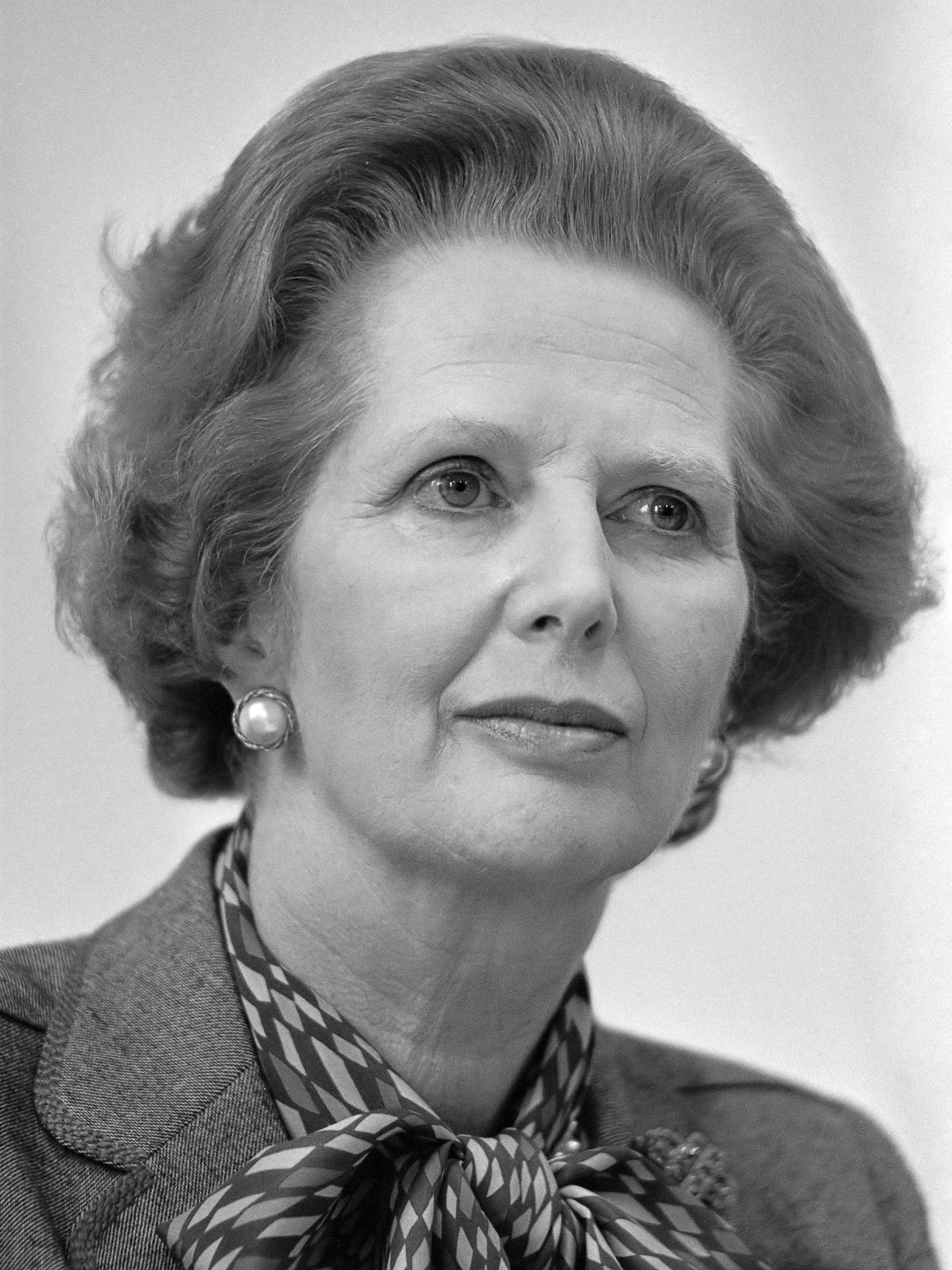

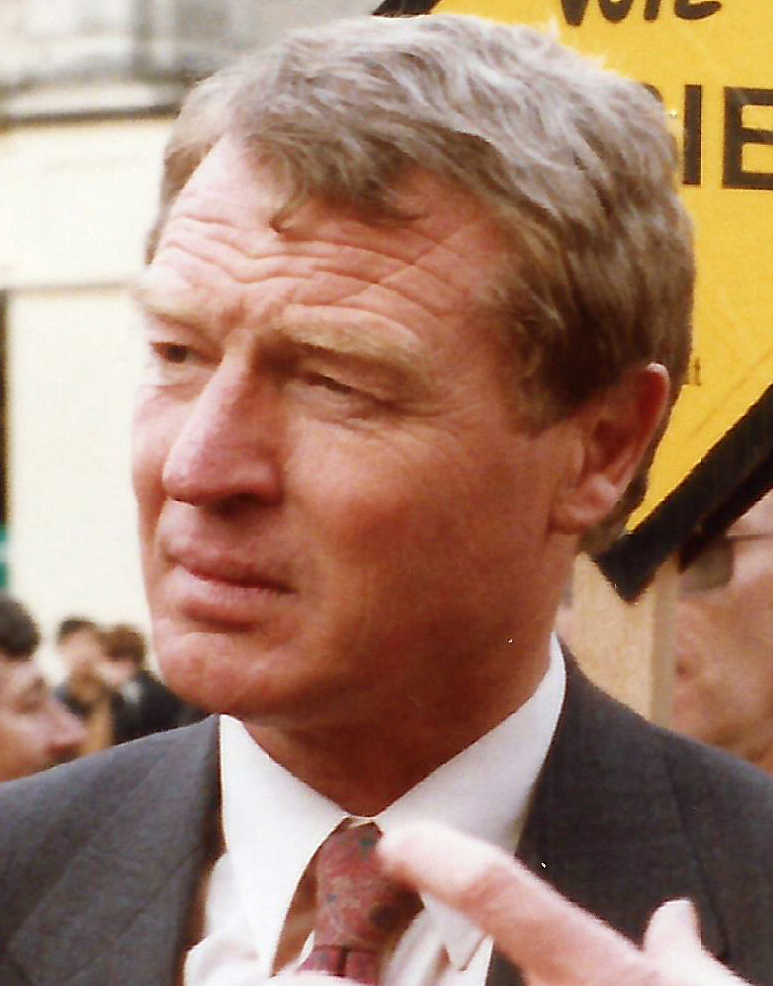
	First party	Second party	Third party
Leader	Neil Kinnock	Margaret Thatcher	Paddy Ashdown
Party	Labour	Conservative	Liberal Democrats
Leader since	2 October 1983	11 February 1975	16 July 1988
Popular vote	938,805	912,130	344,125
Percentage	38.9%	37.8%	14.2%
Swing	▲1.5%	▲2.4%	▼9.8%
Councils	14	12	3
Councils +/–	▼1	▲1	Steady
Councillors	925	731	229
Councillors +/–	▼31	▲46	▼22
- Results by Borough in 1990.

Local government elections took place in London, and some other parts of the United Kingdom on Thursday 3 May 1990.

All London borough council seats were up for election. The previous Borough elections in London were in 1986.

The elections saw a poor result for the recently formed Liberal Democrats, with the party losing 10% of its vote and 20 council seats. This decline was accompanied by success for the Conservatives, who gained 46 councillors and 1 council, while Labour lost 32 council seats and 1 council. The Green Party, fresh from winning 15% of the vote in the European elections one year previously, achieved a record vote share of 6% but elected no councillors. The party would not exceed this result again until 2006.

== Results summary ==
Party	Votes won	% votes	Change	Seats	% seats	Change	Councils	Change
Labour	938,805	38.9	+1.5	926	48.4	-31	14	-1
Conservative	912,130	37.8	+2.4	730	38.1	+46	12	+1
Liberal Democrats	344,125	14.2	-9.8	227	11.9	-22	3	±0
Green	141,569	5.9	+4.7	0	0	±0	0	±0
Others	79,301	3.3	+1.3	31	1.6	+7	0	±0
No overall control	n/a	n/a	n/a	n/a	n/a	n/a	3	±0

- Turnout: 2,383,990 voters cast ballots, a turnout of 48.2% (+2.7%).

== Council results ==
Council	Previous control	Result	Details
Barking and Dagenham	Labour	Labour	Details
Barnet	Conservative	Conservative	Details
Bexley	Conservative	Conservative	Details
Brent	Labour	No overall control	Details
Bromley	Conservative	Conservative	Details
Camden	Labour	Labour	Details
Croydon	Conservative	Conservative	Details
Ealing	Labour	Conservative	Details
Enfield	Conservative	Conservative	Details
Greenwich	Labour	Labour	Details
Hackney	Labour	Labour	Details
Hammersmith and Fulham	Labour	Labour	Details
Haringey	Labour	Labour	Details
Harrow	Conservative	Conservative	Details
Havering	No overall control	No overall control	Details
Hillingdon	No overall control	Conservative	Details
Hounslow	Labour	Labour	Details
Islington	Labour	Labour	Details
Kensington and Chelsea	Conservative	Conservative	Details
Kingston upon Thames	No overall control	No overall control	Details
Lambeth	Labour	Labour	Details
Lewisham	Labour	Labour	Details
Merton	Conservative	Labour	Details
Newham	Labour	Labour	Details
Redbridge	Conservative	Conservative	Details
Richmond upon Thames	Liberal	Liberal Democrats	Details
Southwark	Labour	Labour	Details
Sutton	Liberal	Liberal Democrats	Details
Tower Hamlets	Liberal	Liberal Democrats	Details
Waltham Forest	Labour	Labour	Details
Wandsworth	Conservative	Conservative	Details
Westminster	Conservative	Conservative	Details

== Borough result maps ==
Barking and Dagenham 1990 results map

Barnet 1990 results map

Bexley 1990 results map

Brent 1990 results map

Camden 1990 results map

Hammersmith and Fulham 1990 results map

Merton 1990 results map
