= 1971 Sutton London Borough Council election =

The 1971 Sutton Council election took place on 13 May 1971 to elect members of Sutton London Borough Council in London, England. The whole council was up for election and the Conservative Party stayed in overall control of the council.

== Ward results ==
=== Beddington North ===
Beddington North (2)
Party	Candidate	Votes	%	±%
Labour	G.E.W. Eve	1,069	24.0	
Labour	H. Fox	975	21.9	
Residents	B.J. Carr	757	17.0	
Residents	D.J. Farthing	714	16.0	
Conservative	D.W. Cove	498	11.2	
Conservative	G.H.P. Gardiner	445	10.0	
Turnout		4,458		
Labour hold		Swing		
Labour gain from Conservative		Swing		

=== Beddington South ===
Beddington South (2)
Party	Candidate	Votes	%	±%
Labour	A.W. Deane	1,478	19.4	
Labour	P.L. Spalding	1,467	19.2	
Conservative	W.R. Hadden	1,382	18.1	
Conservative	F.G. Caunt	1,279	16.8	
Residents	R.A. Finch	1,018	13.3	
Residents	Mrs R.E.G. Haydon	1,011	13.2	
Labour gain from Conservative		Swing		
Labour gain from Conservative		Swing		

=== Belmont ===
Belmont (2)
Party	Candidate	Votes	%	±%
Conservative	J.C. Cox	1,320	38.8	
Conservative	R.J.M Akhurst	1,297	38.1	
Labour	D. Jarman	214	6.3	
Labour	Mrs A.J. Lawler	198	5.8	
Liberal	Mrs J. Crowhurst	193	5.7	
Liberal	A. Carr	184	5.4	
Turnout		3,406		
Conservative hold		Swing		
Conservative hold		Swing		

=== Carshalton Central ===
Carshalton Central (2)
Party	Candidate	Votes	%	±%
Conservative	C.W.M. McDowell	784	32.9	
Conservative	D.H.T. Salari	763	32.0	
Labour	J.W. Swain	255	10.7	
Labour	P.C. Simmonds	246	10.3	
Liberal	J.A. Phillimore	174	7.3	
Liberal	E.J. Munns	164	6.9	
Turnout		2,386		
Conservative hold		Swing		
Conservative hold		Swing		
