= 2006 London local elections =

- 4 May 2006

All 1,861 on all 32 London boroughs
- Turnout: 38.9% (▲7.1%)
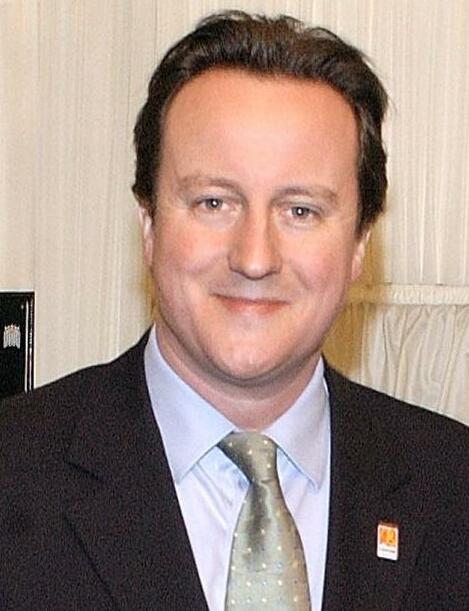

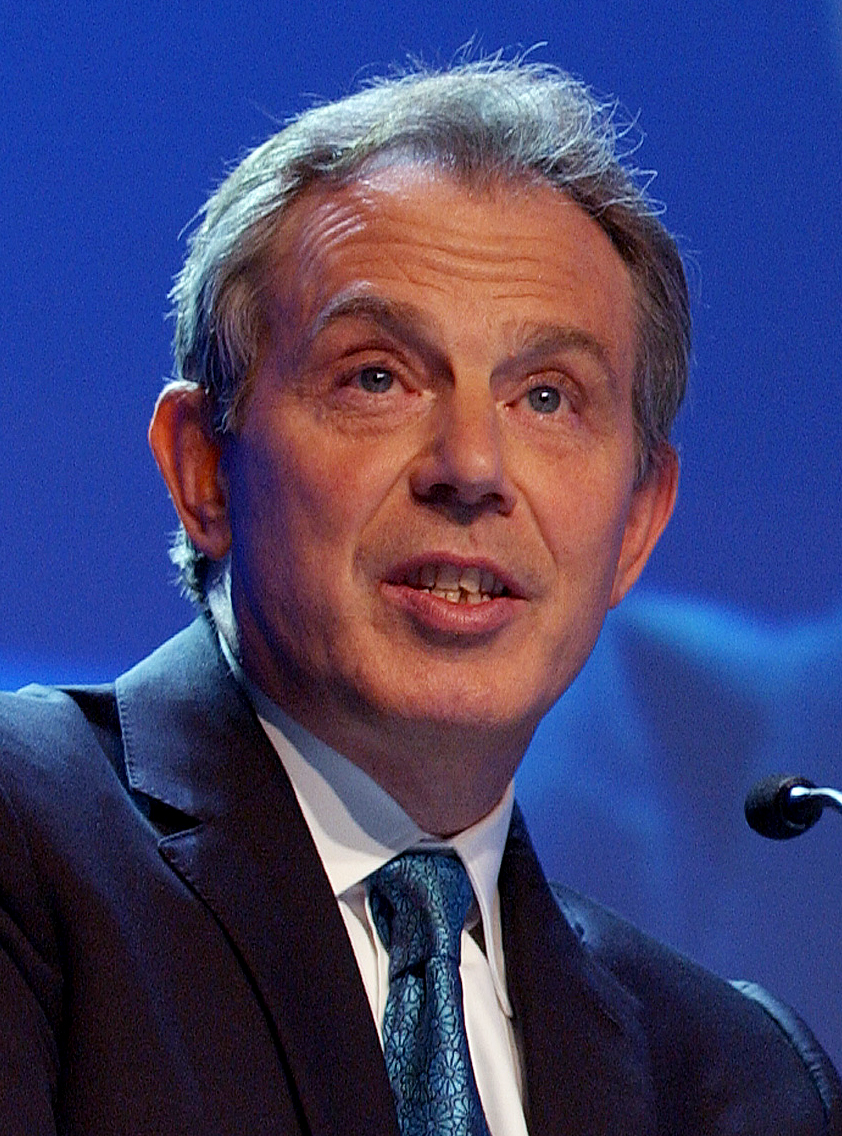

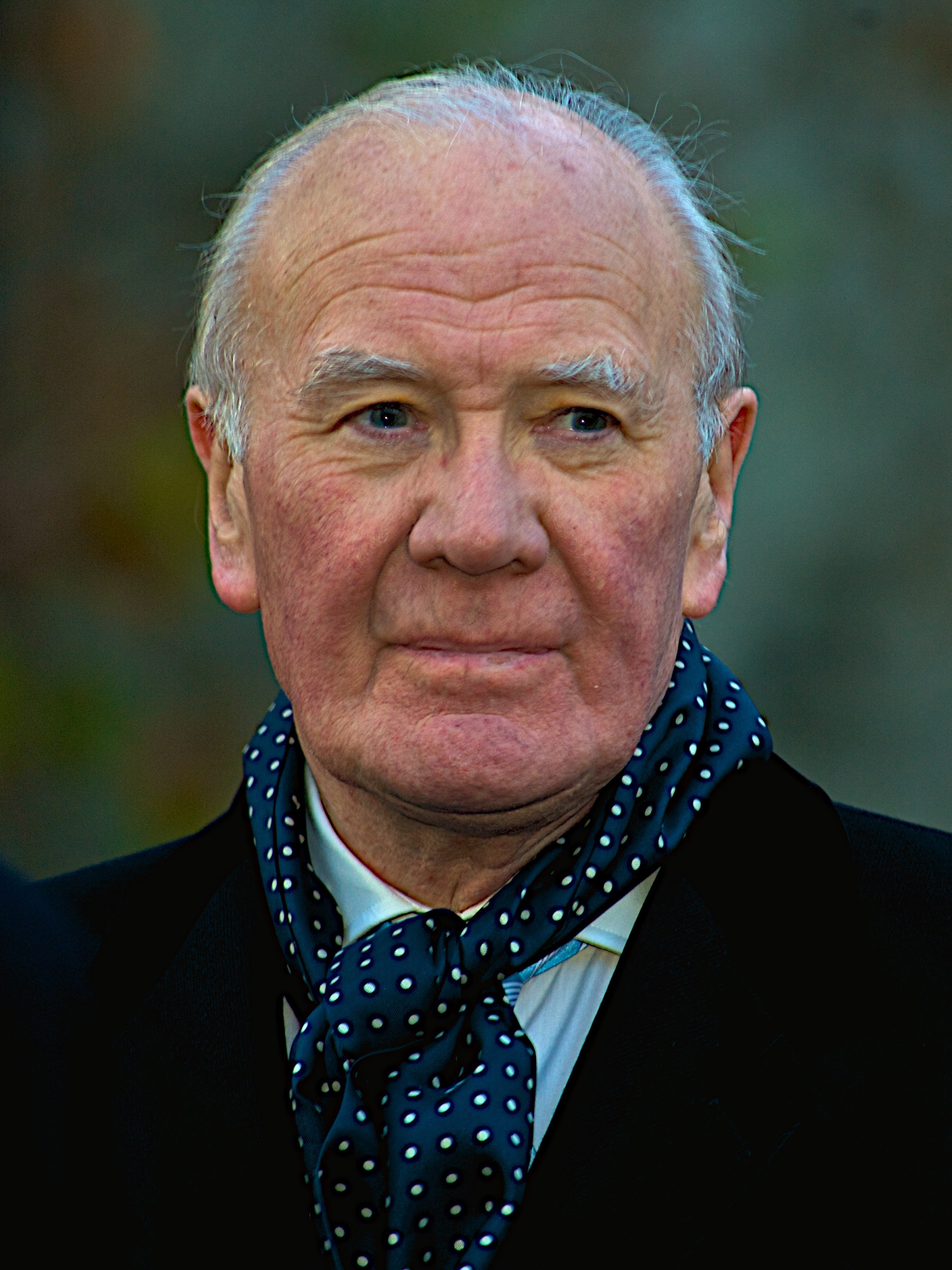
	First party	Second party	Third party
Leader	David Cameron	Tony Blair	Menzies Campbell
Party	Conservative	Labour	Liberal Democrats
Popular vote	746,177	596,570	443,772
Percentage	34.9%	27.9%	20.7%
Swing	▲0.8%	▼6.2%	▲0.1%
Councils	14	7	3
Councils +/–	▲6	▼8	Steady
Councillors	785	684	316
Councillors +/–	▲131	▼182	▲9
- Results by Borough in 2006.

Local government elections took place in London, and some other parts of the United Kingdom on Thursday 4 May 2006. Polling stations were open between 7am and 10pm.

All London borough council seats were up for election. Mayoral contests were held in the London Boroughs of Hackney, Lewisham, and Newham.

The London Conservatives slightly increased their vote share, made 131 council seat gains and won control of 6 new councils, while London Labour saw its vote share decline by 6% and lost 8 councils and 182 seats. The 2006 result was one of Labour's worst local election results in London, with its share of the vote (27.9%), its number of council seats (684) and number of councils (7) all at their lowest levels since 1968. Conversely, the Conservatives won the most seats, the most councils and the most votes in London for the first time since 1982.

The Labour decline was also accompanied by a rise in the number of minor party councillors, mostly concentrated in specific local authorities. Respect won 15 council seats, the British National Party won 14 and the London Green Party won 12. The Christian Peoples Alliance and the Socialist Party also won two seats each. In total, the election saw 76 minor party or independent councillors elected in London, a figure which remains the highest on record.

Altogether, minor parties and independents won 17% of the vote, the highest ever vote share for 'other' parties until the local elections of 2014.

== Results summary ==
Party	Votes won	% votes	Change	Seats	% seats	Change	Councils	Change
Conservative	746,177	34.9	+0.8	785	42.2	+133	14	+6
Labour	596,570	27.9	-6.0	684	36.8	-182	7	-8
Liberal Democrats	443,772	20.7	+0.1	316	17.0	+9	3	±0
Green	169,160	7.9	+2.4	12	0.6	+11	0	±0
Respect	38,662	1.8	n/a	15	0.8	+15	0	±0
BNP	21,625	1.0	+0.6	14	0.8	+14	0	±0
Others	123,713	5.8	+0.4	35	1.9	+2	0	±0
No overall control	n/a	n/a	n/a	n/a	n/a	n/a	8	+2

- Turnout: 2,284,882 voters cast ballots, a turnout of 38.9% (+7.1%).

== Council results ==
Council	Previous control	Result	Details
Barking and Dagenham	Labour	Labour	Details
Barnet	Conservative	Conservative	Details
Bexley	Labour	Conservative	Details
Brent	Labour	No overall control	Details
Bromley	Conservative	Conservative	Details
Camden	Labour	No overall control	Details
Croydon	Labour	Conservative	Details
Ealing	Labour	Conservative	Details
Enfield	Conservative	Conservative	Details
Greenwich	Labour	Labour	Details
Hackney	Labour	Labour	Details
Hammersmith and Fulham	Labour	Conservative	Details
Haringey	Labour	Labour	Details
Harrow	No overall control	Conservative	Details
Havering	No overall control	Conservative	Details
Hillingdon	No overall control	Conservative	Details
Hounslow	Labour	No overall control	Details
Islington	Liberal Democrats	No overall control	Details
Kensington and Chelsea	Conservative	Conservative	Details
Kingston upon Thames	Liberal Democrats	Liberal Democrats	Details
Lambeth	No overall control	Labour	Details
Lewisham	Labour	No overall control	Details
Merton	Labour	No overall control	Details
Newham	Labour	Labour	Details
Redbridge	Conservative	Conservative	Details
Richmond upon Thames	Conservative	Liberal Democrats	Details
Southwark	No overall control	No overall control	Details
Sutton	Liberal Democrats	Liberal Democrats	Details
Tower Hamlets	Labour	Labour	Details
Waltham Forest	No overall control	No overall control	Details
Wandsworth	Conservative	Conservative	Details
Westminster	Conservative	Conservative	Details

== Overall councillor numbers ==
The largest party in terms of councils and councillors became the Conservative Party after this election, with losses by the Labour Party and a small increase in share of the vote to the Liberal Democrats. Smaller national parties made significant gains, with the British National Party and Respect having the second-largest number of councillors in the London Borough of Barking and Dagenham and Tower Hamlets (respectively). The Green Party also saw its gains concentrated on one area to achieve the third most councillors in the London Borough of Lewisham. Scattered across boroughs, unaffiliated residents groups won 24 council seats.

London local elections 2006 Councillor statistics
Party	Seats	Gain/loss
Conservative	785	+132
Labour	685	-181
Liberal Democrats	317	+8
Respect	15	+12
BNP	14	+14
Green	12	+10
CPA	3	+2
Socialist	2	0
Local	24	
Independent	5	

== Mayoral results ==
In three London boroughs the executive function of the council is a directly elected mayor. The mayoral elections take place at the same time as councillor elections in those boroughs.

Mayoralty	2002	2006
Hackney	Jules Pipe (Labour)	Jules Pipe (Labour)
Lewisham	Sir Steve Bullock (Labour)	Sir Steve Bullock (Labour)
Newham	Robin Wales (Labour)	Robin Wales (Labour)

== Ward result maps ==
=== London-wide ===
The map below shows the results for each ward across the whole of Greater London.

2006 London local elections results map

=== By borough ===
Barking and Dagenham 2006 results map

Barnet 2006 results map

Bexley 2006 results map

Brent 2006 results map

Bromley 2006 results map

Camden 2006 results map

Croydon 2006 results map

Ealing 2006 results map

Enfield 2006 results map

Greenwich 2006 results map

Hackney 2006 results map

Hammersmith and Fulham 2006 results map

Haringey 2006 results map

Harrow 2006 results map

Havering 2006 results map

Hillingdon 2006 results map

Hounslow 2006 results map

Islington 2006 results map

Kensington and Chelsea 2006 results map

Kingston upon Thames 2006 results map

Lambeth 2006 results map

Lewisham 2006 results map

Merton 2006 results map

Newham 2006 results map

Redbridge 2006 results map

Richmond upon Thames 2006 results map

Southwark 2006 results map

Sutton 2006 results map

Tower Hamlets 2006 results map

Waltham Forest 2006 results map

Wandsworth 2006 results map

Westminster 2006 results map
