= 1982 Sutton London Borough Council election =

The 1982 Sutton Council election took place on 6 May 1982 to elect members of Sutton London Borough Council in London, England. The whole council was up for election and the Conservative party stayed in overall control of the council.

== Election result ==
1982 Sutton London Borough Council election
Party	Seats	Gains	Losses	Net gain/loss	Seats %	Votes %	Votes	+/−
Conservative	46	0	1	▼1	83.9	50.7	32,221	
Alliance	3	1	0	▲1	5.3	34.7	21,836	
Labour	7	0	0	Steady	12.5	14.1	8,572	
Ecology	0	0	0	Steady	0.0	0.3	262	
National Front	0	0	0	Steady	0.0	0.0	62	

== Ward results ==
Beddington North (2)
Party	Candidate	Votes	%	±%
Conservative	Francis McNamara	1,211		
Conservative	Ronald Bishop	1,193		
Liberal	Philip Griffin	1,087	43.1	
Liberal	Duncan R Ponikwer	1,023		
Labour	Jeremy Baker	223		
Labour	Derek Clee	218		

Beddington South (3)
Party	Candidate	Votes	%	±%
Conservative	Henry Sawyers*	1,223		
Conservative	Arnold Cummins	1,189		
Conservative	Gwendoline Pook	1,164		
SDP	Kenneth Bishop	1,023	34.0	
SDP	Elizabeth Saunders	1,022		
SDP	John Jukes	1,007		
Labour	Stanley Spalding	762		
Labour	John Clay	755		
Labour	Doris Richards	696		

Belmont (2)
Party	Candidate	Votes	%	±%
Conservative	Keith Dodwell			
Conservative	Joyce K M Bowley	1,617		
Liberal	Robert P Gleeson	688	27.4	
SDP	Owen Saunders			
Labour	Jacqueline Lawler			
Labour	Eric Marshall			
Ecology	Robert Hambrook			

Carshalton Beeches (3)
Party	Candidate	Votes	%	±%
Conservative	Edward Crowley			
Conservative	Keith Martin*			
Conservative	Mavis Peart*	2,356		
Liberal	Peter Doran	980	26.6	
SDP	Katherine Collins			
SDP	Robert Pearson			
Labour				
Labour				
Labour				

Carshalton Central (2)
Party	Candidate	Votes	%	±%
Conservative	Peter Baggott*			
Conservative	Reginald Venters	1,274		
Liberal	Albert Harris	736		
SDP	William Higgins			
Labour				
Labour				

Carshalton North (2)
Party	Candidate	Votes	%	±%
Conservative	Trevor Russel			
Conservative	Florence Ghent*	1,328		
SDP	Simon Holding	1,054		
Liberal	John Phillimore			
Labour				
Labour				

Cheam South (2)
Party	Candidate	Votes	%	±%
Conservative	Kenneth Rose*			
Conservative	Edward Trevor	2,000		
SDP	Ray Rowden	300		
Liberal	Donald Strong			
Labour				
Labour				
Ecology				

Cheam West (2)
Party	Candidate	Votes	%	±%
Conservative	Kenneth Cole			
Conservative	Deborah Mangnall	1,431		
Liberal	Elizabeth Sharp	1,094		
Liberal	Stuart Walker*			
Labour				
Labour				

Clockhouse (1)
Party	Candidate	Votes	%	±%
Conservative	Dick Barnard*	461		
SDP	Ian Martin	382		
Labour				

North Cheam (2)
Party	Candidate	Votes	%	±%
Conservative	John Sharvill*			
Conservative	Clifford Carter*	1,302		
Liberal	Ms Lesley F O'Connell	1,288	45.7	
SDP	Terence A Woods			
Labour				
Labour				

Rosehill (2)
Party	Candidate	Votes	%	±%
Conservative	Anne Richmond			
Conservative	Thomas Watts	1,096		
Liberal	Joy Taylor	978	41.2	
Liberal	Patrick Gallivan			
Labour				
Labour				
Ecology				

St Helier North (3)
Party	Candidate	Votes	%	±%
Labour	Patrick Kane*			
Labour	Albert Dyson*			
Labour	Moreen Wright*			
Conservative				
Conservative				
Conservative				
SDP				
Liberal				
SDP				
National Front				
National Front				

St Helier South (2)
Party	Candidate	Votes	%	±%
Labour	Philip Bassett*			
Labour	John Evers			
Liberal	Warwick Neill	350		
SDP	Douglas Herbison			
Conservative				
Conservative				

Sutton Central (2)
Party	Candidate	Votes	%	±%
Liberal	Graham Norman Tope*	1,469	60.2	
Liberal	Rev. John Aubrey Mullin*	1,336		
Conservative		724		
Conservative		724		
Labour				
Labour				

Sutton Common (2)
Party	Candidate	Votes	%	±%
Conservative	Lesley Barber*			
Conservative	Pauline Kavanagh	1,175		
Liberal	Stephen Penneck	1,152	46.4	
Liberal	Susan Traverso			
Labour				
Labour				

Sutton East (3)
Party	Candidate	Votes	%	±%
Conservative	Jessica Dodwell			
Conservative	Stephen Langley			
Conservative	Anne Richards	1,136		
Liberal	Neil Frater	1,005	35.0	
Liberal	Michael A Cooper	981		
SDP	Aidan Tierney			
Labour				
Labour				
Labour				

Sutton South (3)
Party	Candidate	Votes	%	±%
Conservative	Peter Geiringer*			
Conservative	Richard Barber			
Conservative	Paul Mangnall	2,312		
SDP	Peter Masson	951	25.7	
SDP	Joyce Marsh			
Liberal	Cicely Willis			
Labour				
Labour				
Labour				

Sutton West (2)
Party	Candidate	Votes	%	±%
Conservative	Michael J W Cooper	1,267		
Liberal	Christopher Caswill	1,236		
Conservative	Lynette Ranson	1,169		
Liberal	Sarah Hickman	1,148		
Labour				
Labour				
Ecology				

Wallington North (3)
Party	Candidate	Votes	%	±%
Conservative	Martin Brinkman			
Conservative	Douglas Commaille*			
Conservative	Jack Izard*	1,700		
Liberal	Thomas Edward Dutton	1,274	33.4	
Liberal	Joseph Farrelly			
SDP	John West			
Labour				
Labour				
Labour				

Wallington South (3)
Party	Candidate	Votes	%	±%
Conservative	Robert Johnson*			
Conservative	Frederick Townsend*			
Conservative	Edward Pascoe	1,962		
Liberal	William Ward	910	27.8	
SDP	Audrey Heymann			
SDP	John Smoker			
Labour				
Labour				
Labour				

Wandle Valley (2)
Party	Candidate	Votes	%	±%
Labour	Michael Woolley*			
Labour	Malcolm Smith*	752		
SDP	Philip Ratcliffe	622	33.1	
Liberal	David Wiles			
Conservative				
Conservative				

Woodcote (1)
Party	Candidate	Votes	%	±%
Conservative	Graham Witham	1,062	77.6	
Liberal	Stephen Manger	249	18.2	
Labour				

Worcester Park North (3)
Party	Candidate	Votes	%	±%
Conservative	Peter Woolley*			
Conservative	Janet Woolley			
Conservative	Ann Tims	1,747		
SDP	Eva Gregory	1,296	38.5	
Liberal	Joan Crowhurst			
Liberal	John Pitcher			
Labour				
Labour				
Labour				

Worcester Park South (2)
Party	Candidate	Votes	%	±%
Conservative	Richard Anthony Kerslake*			
Conservative	David Trafford*	1,382		
Liberal	Ruth Mary Shaw	1,225	43.3	
SDP	Brenda Billingham			
Labour				
Labour				

Wrythe Green (2)
Party	Candidate	Votes	%	±%
Conservative	Gwendolin Bates*			
Conservative	Roy Whitehair	1,096		
SDP	Janet Garwood	996	35.5	
Liberal	Cathryn Wiles			
Labour				
Labour				
