= 1971 London local elections =

- 13 May 1971

All 1,863 on all 32 London boroughs
- Turnout: 38.7% (▲2.9%)
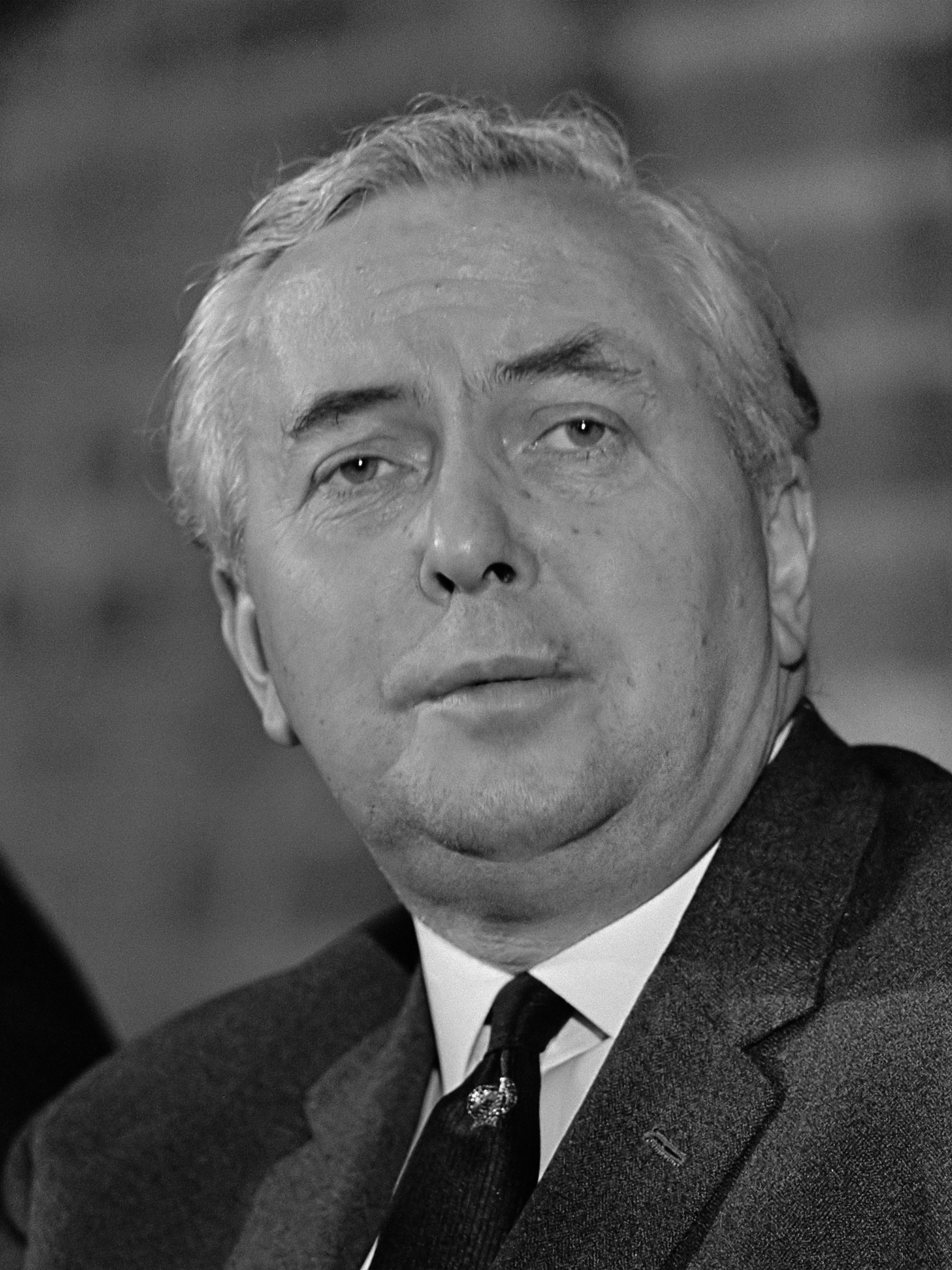

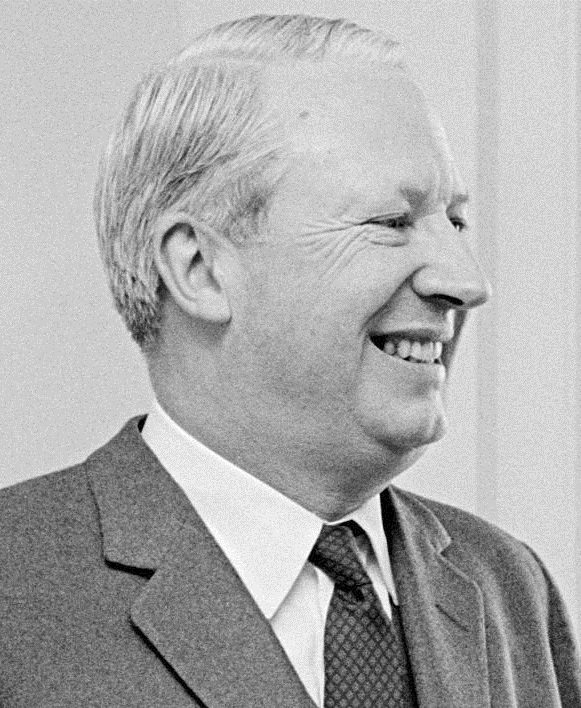
	First party	Second party
Leader	Harold Wilson	Edward Heath
Party	Labour	Conservative
Leader since	14 February 1963	27 July 1965
Councils	21	10
Councils +/–	▲18	▼18
Councillors	1,221	597
Councillors +/–	▲871	▼841
- Results by Borough in 1971. (Red indicates Labour, blue indicates the Conservatives and black indicates No Overall Control)

Local government elections took place in London, and some other parts of the United Kingdom on Thursday 13 May 1971.

All London borough council seats were up for election. The previous Borough elections in London were in 1968.

== Results summary ==
Party	Councillors	Change	Councils	Change
Labour	1,221	+871	21	+18
Conservative	597	-841	10	-18
Liberal	9	-1	0	±0
Others	36	-29	0	±0
No overall control	n/a	n/a	1	±0

- Turnout: 2,105,571 voters cast ballots, a turnout of 38.7% (+2.9%).

== Council results ==
Council	Previous control	Result	Details
Barking	Labour	Labour	Details
Barnet	Conservative	Conservative	Details
Bexley	Conservative	Labour	Details
Brent	Conservative	Labour	Details
Bromley	Conservative	Conservative	Details
Camden	Conservative	Labour	Details
Croydon	Conservative	Conservative	Details
Ealing	Conservative	Labour	Details
Enfield	Conservative	Conservative	Details
Greenwich	Conservative	Labour	Details
Hackney	Conservative	Labour	Details
Hammersmith	Conservative	Labour	Details
Haringey	Conservative	Labour	Details
Harrow	Conservative	No overall control	Details
Havering	Conservative	Labour	Details
Hillingdon	Conservative	Labour	Details
Hounslow	Conservative	Labour	Details
Islington	Conservative	Labour	Details
Kensington and Chelsea	Conservative	Conservative	Details
Kingston upon Thames	Conservative	Conservative	Details
Lambeth	Conservative	Labour	Details
Lewisham	Conservative	Labour	Details
Merton	Conservative	Labour	Details
Newham	No overall control	Labour	Details
Redbridge	Conservative	Conservative	Details
Richmond upon Thames	Conservative	Conservative	Details
Southwark	Labour	Labour	Details
Sutton	Conservative	Conservative	Details
Tower Hamlets	Labour	Labour	Details
Waltham Forest	Conservative	Labour	Details
Wandsworth	Conservative	Labour	Details
Westminster	Conservative	Conservative	Details

== Overall councillor numbers ==
London local elections 1971 Councillor statistics
Party	Seats	Gain/loss
Labour	1,221	+871
Conservative	597	-841
Liberal	9	-1
Others	36	-29
