= 1982 Haringey London Borough Council election =

1982 local election in England

The 1982 Haringey Council election took place on 6 May 1982 to elect members of Haringey London Borough Council in London, England. The whole council was up for election and the Labour Party stayed in overall control of the council.

== Election result ==
Haringey local election result 1982
Party	Seats	Gains	Losses	Net gain/loss	Seats %	Votes %	Votes	+/−
Labour	33	0	9	-9				
Conservative	26	9	0	+9				
Alliance	0	0	0	±0				
Ecology	0	0	0	±0				
Workers Revolutionary	0	0	0	±0				
Communist	0	0	0	±0				
Democrat Pro Life	0	0	0	±0				

== Ward results ==
=== Alexandra ===
Alexandra (3)
Party	Candidate	Votes	%	±%
Conservative	Brian Salinger	1,629	42.0	−4.8
Conservative	Victor Jary*	1,624	41.9	−3.5
Conservative	Cecil Baylis	1,613	41.6	−4.0
Labour	Cecila Ellacott	1,075	27.7	−7.6
Labour	Peter Clarke	1,054	27.2	−7.1
Labour	Dorothy Wonnacott	1,040	26.8	−6.4
Alliance (Liberal)	Clive World	1,016	26.2	+14.6
Alliance (Liberal)	Arthur Olver	1,011	26.1	+12.3
Alliance (SDP)	Simon Taylor	1,005	25.9	+13.6
Turnout		3,878	51.8	+6.2
Conservative hold		Swing		
Conservative hold		Swing		
Conservative hold		Swing		

=== Archway ===
Archway (2)
Party	Candidate	Votes	%	±%
Conservative	Alistair Burt	1,157	43.5	−4.8
Conservative	Sarah Whitby*	1,137	42.7	−5.8
Labour	Rosemary Elworthy	722	27.1	−13.4
Labour	Jeremy Short	696	26.2	−12.9
Alliance (SDP)	Faith Davey	672	25.3	+17.2
Alliance (Liberal)	Elizabeth Harrington	638	24.0	N/A
Ecology	Glenys Parry	82	3.1	N/A
Turnout		2,661	53.7	+8.7
Conservative hold		Swing		
Conservative hold		Swing		

=== Bowes Park ===
Bowes Park (3)
Party	Candidate	Votes	%	±%
Conservative	Jacqueline Harding	1,625	41.3	−0.3
Conservative	Neil O'Shea	1,610	41.0	−0.4
Conservative	Pearl Hurry	1,582	40.2	−0.5
Labour	Kevin Hargreaves*	1,370	34.9	−9.3
Labour	James Gardner*	1,355	34.5	−10.4
Labour	Lucy Arnold	1,307	33.2	−9.1
Alliance (SDP)	John Bishop	776	19.7	+13.3
Alliance (Liberal)	Margaret Davies	746	19.0	+13.9
Alliance (SDP)	Derek Pringle	711	18.1	N/A
Turnout		3,931	46.3	+2.7
Conservative gain from Labour		Swing		
Conservative gain from Labour		Swing		
Conservative gain from Labour		Swing		

=== Bruce Grove ===
Bruce Grove (3)
Party	Candidate	Votes	%	±%
Labour	Bernie Grant*	1,377	52.0	−8.3
Labour	Robert Harris	1,340	50.6	−6.6
Labour	Ernest Large	1,336	50.4	−6.0
Alliance (SDP)	Malcolm Chapman	595	22.5	N/A
Alliance (SDP)	Franklin Massicott	554	20.9	N/A
Alliance (SDP)	Edwin Rayner	554	20.9	N/A
Conservative	Dennis Beale	528	19.9	−8.8
Conservative	Marianne Ford	526	19.9	−7.2
Conservative	Vincent Miskinis	514	19.4	−6.6
Workers Revolutionary	Elizabeth Field	51	1.9	N/A
Turnout		2,649	35.5	+0.9
Labour hold		Swing		
Labour hold		Swing		
Labour hold		Swing		

=== Coleraine ===
Coleraine (3)
Party	Candidate	Votes	%	±%
Labour	Anthony Rigby*	1,306	41.5	−7.4
Labour	Elizabeth Simons	1,177	37.4	−5.3
Labour	Patrick Tonge	1,146	36.4	−5.9
Conservative	Leonard Jackson	1,051	33.4	+8.9
Conservative	Donald Head	1,034	32.8	+8.7
Conservative	Christopher Palmer	986	31.3	+7.8
Alliance (Liberal)	John Hammond	587	18.6	N/A
Alliance (Liberal)	Alexander L'Estrange	587	18.6	N/A
Alliance (Liberal)	Attila Borzak	568	18.0	N/A
Turnout		3,149	38.9	−0.6
Labour hold		Swing		
Labour hold		Swing		
Labour hold		Swing		

=== Crouch End ===
Crouch End (3)
Party	Candidate	Votes	%	±%
Conservative	Brian Smith*	1,337	39.4	−10.0
Conservative	Heather Thorpe	1,303	38.4	−9.7
Conservative	Stephen Ayres*	1,289	37.9	−10.9
Labour	Max Morris	1,047	30.8	−8.1
Labour	Dennis Carpenter	1,046	30.8	−6.6
Labour	Terence O'Sullivan**	1,027	30.2	−6.4
Alliance (SDP)	Pierre Fawcett	785	23.1	+12.4
Alliance (Liberal)	Richard Whitton	747	22.0	N/A
Alliance (SDP)	Ralph Shafran	724	21.3	N/A
Ecology	David Burns	174	5.1	N/A
Turnout		3,397	51.7	+10.3
Conservative hold		Swing		
Conservative hold		Swing		
Conservative hold		Swing		

Terence O'Sullivan was a sitting councillor for Noel Park ward.

=== Fortis Green ===
Fortis Green (3)
Party	Candidate	Votes	%	±%
Conservative	Christopher Hannington*	1,875	46.7	−8.4
Conservative	Jeffrey Lotery*	1,793	44.7	−10.1
Conservative	Jean MacGregor*	1,769	44.1	−10.8
Alliance (Liberal)	Richard Kennard	992	24.7	+17.8
Labour	David Davies	979	24.4	−9.2
Alliance (SDP)	Melvyn Kaufman	972	24.2	N/A
Labour	Helen Peters	950	23.7	−9.8
Alliance (SDP)	David Withey	919	22.9	N/A
Labour	Surinder Attariwala	903	22.5	−8.0
Communist	Stephen Cottingham	146	3.6	N/A
Turnout		4,014	54.6	+8.3
Conservative hold		Swing		
Conservative hold		Swing		
Conservative hold		Swing		

=== Green Lanes ===
Green Lanes (2)
Party	Candidate	Votes	%	±%
Labour	Andreas Mikkides	1,090	55.6	−5.9
Labour	Rosalind Cave	1,087	55.5	−4.5
Conservative	Deborah Everard	486	24.8	−1.7
Conservative	Andrew Minnis	429	21.9	−3.6
Alliance (Liberal)	Hugo Reading	315	16.1	+10.2
Alliance (Liberal)	Frank Slight	279	14.2	+9.7
Turnout		1,960	36.0	−0.7
Labour hold		Swing		
Labour hold		Swing		

=== Harringay ===
Harringay (3)
Party	Candidate	Votes	%	±%
Labour	Jeremy Corbyn*	1,839	57.8	+4.6
Labour	Ronald Blanchard*	1,731	54.4	+3.6
Labour	Christakis Zissimos	1,724	54.2	−0.5
Conservative	Christakis Kavallares	673	21.1	−11.2
Conservative	Sally Lumb	664	20.9	−11.9
Conservative	Edward Webb	659	20.7	−11.8
Alliance (SDP)	Robert Burns	498	15.6	N/A
Alliance (SDP)	Nigel Gilbert	453	14.2	N/A
Alliance (Liberal)	Paul Moynagh	420	13.2	N/A
Communist	Francis Carr	190	6.0	−1.1
Turnout		3,183	42.4	+2.5
Labour hold		Swing		
Labour hold		Swing		
Labour hold		Swing		

=== High Cross ===
High Cross (2)
Party	Candidate	Votes	%	±%
Labour	Anthony McBrearty*	928	50.4	−0.7
Labour	Robin Young*	841	45.7	±0.0
Conservative	Martin Keller	431	23.4	+2.0
Conservative	Anne Robertson	417	22.7	N/A
Alliance (Liberal)	Joseph Fletcher	396	21.5	N/A
Alliance (Liberal)	Cyriac Maprayil	340	18.5	N/A
Turnout		1,841	38.9	−1.3
Labour hold		Swing		
Labour hold		Swing		

=== Highgate ===
Highgate (2)
Party	Candidate	Votes	%	±%
Conservative	Anthony Dignum*	1,524	56.2	−13.5
Conservative	Bryan Morris	1,490	55.0	−13.1
Alliance (SDP)	Martin Barber	701	25.9	N/A
Alliance (Liberal)	Barrie Cooper	671	24.8	N/A
Labour	Barbara Simon	300	11.1	−12.8
Labour	Susan Crump	299	11.0	−12.9
Turnout		2,711	54.5	+11.1
Conservative hold		Swing		
Conservative hold		Swing		

=== Hornsey Central ===
Hornsey Central (2)
Party	Candidate	Votes	%	±%
Labour	Brian Bullard*	1,220	44.9	−6.2
Labour	Toby Harris*	1,135	41.7	−4.3
Conservative	Maureen Dalton	923	33.9	−5.7
Conservative	David Myers-Nobbs	877	32.2	−4.8
Alliance (SDP)	George Simpson	446	16.4	+12.0
Alliance (Liberal)	Philip Jimenez	432	15.9	N/A
Ecology	Joan Schwitzer	73	2.7	N/A
Turnout		2,720	53.9	+3.6
Labour hold		Swing		
Labour hold		Swing		

=== Hornsey Vale ===
Hornsey Vale (2)
Party	Candidate	Votes	%	±%
Labour	Vivienne Fenwick*	957	43.6	−5.8
Labour	Stephen King	861	39.2	−4.7
Conservative	Peter Gilbert	740	33.7	−2.1
Conservative	Iain Dewar	732	33.4	−1.0
Alliance (SDP)	Robert Missig	351	16.0	+6.2
Alliance (Liberal)	Verity Smith	329	15.0	+7.6
Communist	Peter Sinclair	71	3.2	N/A
Turnout		2,194	46.8	+5.8
Labour hold		Swing		
Labour hold		Swing		

=== Muswell Hill ===
Muswell Hill (3)
Party	Candidate	Votes	%	±%
Conservative	Benjamin Hall*	2,032	47.0	−11.5
Conservative	Aeronwy Harris*	1,985	45.9	−9.6
Conservative	Robert Mason	1,980	45.8	−9.2
Alliance (Liberal)	Francis Coleman	1,136	26.3	+17.9
Alliance (SDP)	Terence Pope	1,107	25.6	N/A
Alliance (SDP)	Michael Watson	1,077	24.9	N/A
Labour	Yvonne Bonnamy	1,036	24.0	−9.5
Labour	Pauline Ashbridge	1,023	23.7	−9.5
Labour	David Perkin	1,016	23.5	−8.3
Turnout		4,320	55.8	+10.7
Conservative hold		Swing		
Conservative hold		Swing		
Conservative hold		Swing		

=== Noel Park ===
Noel Park (3)
Party	Candidate	Votes	%	±%
Labour	John Brennan	1,519	42.5	−6.6
Labour	Nigel Knowles	1,450	40.5	−7.9
Labour	Narendra Makanji	1,419	39.7	−8.6
Conservative	William Golden	1,324	37.0	−1.0
Conservative	Dennis Allin	1,317	36.8	+0.9
Conservative	Christine Johnston	1,292	36.1	+0.6
Alliance (SDP)	Bert Baker	543	15.2	+11.8
Alliance (SDP)	Jeremy Simons	541	15.1	N/A
Alliance (SDP)	Kevin Twaite	502	14.0	N/A
Democrat Pro Life	Edward Fawcett	110	3.1	N/A
Turnout		3,578	45.0	+0.2
Labour hold		Swing		
Labour hold		Swing		
Labour hold		Swing		

=== Park ===
Park (2)
Party	Candidate	Votes	%	±%
Labour	Eileen Garwood*	1,048	49.9	−0.3
Labour	Nicole Harrison*	957	45.5	+0.1
Conservative	Brian Boyle	683	32.5	+3.5
Conservative	Anne Allen	665	31.7	−0.8
Alliance (Liberal)	Jennifer Pearson	301	14.3	N/A
Alliance (SDP)	Mark Wakefield	294	14.0	N/A
Turnout		2,101	38.9	−3.4
Labour hold		Swing		
Labour hold		Swing		

=== Seven Sisters ===
Seven Sisters (2)
Party	Candidate	Votes	%	±%
Labour	Frederick Knight*	921	61.3	+0.4
Labour	Paul Loach*	818	54.5	+2.4
Conservative	Trevor Ford	306	20.4	−8.6
Conservative	Lilian Randall	282	18.8	−7.1
Alliance (SDP)	Robert Andrewes	260	17.3	N/A
Alliance (SDP)	John Gray	244	16.2	N/A
Turnout		1,502	35.2	−0.5
Labour hold		Swing		
Labour hold		Swing		

=== South Hornsey ===
South Hornsey (2)
Party	Candidate	Votes	%	±%
Labour	Arthur Jones*	1,031	45.9	−6.1
Labour	Colin Sherriff*	944	42.1	−6.1
Conservative	Oliver Champion	738	32.9	−6.1
Conservative	Michael Morrison	716	31.9	−3.8
Alliance (SDP)	Anne Manger	336	15.0	+9.9
Alliance (SDP)	Jonathan Popper	334	14.9	N/A
Workers Revolutionary	David Clayton	38	1.7	N/A
Turnout		2,244	52.2	+12.2
Labour hold		Swing		
Labour hold		Swing		

=== South Tottenham ===
South Tottenham (2)
Party	Candidate	Votes	%	±%
Conservative	Michael Coney	1,031	45.1	+9.0
Labour	Andrew Love*	884	38.7	−12.0
Labour	Donald Billingsley**	872	38.2	−9.0
Conservative	William Band	869	38.0	+23.9
Alliance (SDP)	Peter Davey	280	12.3	N/A
Alliance (SDP)	John Montagu-Leon	265	11.6	N/A
Turnout		2,284	47.3	+0.3
Conservative gain from Labour		Swing		
Labour hold		Swing		

Donald Billingsley was a sitting councillor for Bruce Grove ward.

=== Tottenham Central ===
Tottenham Central (3)
Party	Candidate	Votes	%	±%
Labour	George Meehan**	1,384	52.9	−11.1
Labour	Iris Woodger*	1,373	52.5	−6.0
Labour	Angela Krokou	1,344	51.4	−8.9
Conservative	Dennis McGarry	667	25.5	+4.7
Conservative	Patricia Harris	653	25.0	+4.4
Conservative	Winifred Chappell	647	24.7	+4.7
Alliance (Liberal)	Marios Georgiou	372	14.2	+9.6
Alliance (Liberal)	Shamsuddin Chowdhury	336	12.8	N/A
Alliance (Liberal)	Nandlall Puttur	207	7.9	N/A
Turnout		2,616	35.8	+0.5
Labour hold		Swing		
Labour hold		Swing		
Labour hold		Swing		

George Meehan was a sitting councillor for Green Lanes ward.

=== West Green ===
West Green (3)
Party	Candidate	Votes	%	±%
Conservative	Walter Taylor	1,449	40.9	+3.4
Conservative	Philip Mandeville	1,444	40.8	+4.9
Conservative	Mary Salim	1,426	40.3	+5.8
Labour	Glenys Atkinson*	1,324	37.4	−14.5
Labour	Douglas Clark*	1,230	34.8	−13.5
Labour	Stephen Whittle*	1,178	33.3	−12.0
Alliance (Liberal)	Katherine Alexander	676	19.1	N/A
Alliance (Liberal)	Thomas Oswald	589	16.6	N/A
Alliance (Liberal)	Charles Wenz	570	16.1	N/A
Turnout		3,539	44.5	+5.6
Conservative gain from Labour		Swing		
Conservative gain from Labour		Swing		
Conservative gain from Labour		Swing		

=== White Hart Lane ===
White Hart Lane (3)
Party	Candidate	Votes	%	±%
Labour	Victor Butler*	1,354	44.1	−9.1
Labour	Maureen Dewar*	1,311	42.7	−2.0
Labour	Collin Ware*	1,252	40.8	−2.7
Conservative	Ian Johnston	1,058	34.5	−0.1
Conservative	Michael Osborne	1,048	34.1	+1.8
Conservative	Gladys Weeks	1,005	32.7	+0.7
Alliance (SDP)	Kenneth Shepherd	469	15.3	N/A
Alliance (Liberal)	David Green	443	14.4	N/A
Alliance (Liberal)	Edgar Bradshaw	440	14.3	N/A
Turnout		3,069	39.6	−0.7
Labour hold		Swing		
Labour hold		Swing		
Labour hold		Swing		

=== Woodside ===
Woodside (3)
Party	Candidate	Votes	%	±%
Conservative	Bernard Dehnel*	1,430	43.0	+0.2
Conservative	Olive Baker	1,389	41.7	−2.1
Conservative	Eva Robinson	1,382	41.5	−0.4
Labour	Ulric Thompson	1,214	36.5	−6.8
Labour	Frederick Neuner**	1,174	35.3	−6.0
Labour	David Billingsley*	1,171	35.2	−9.1
Alliance (SDP)	Sheila Berkery Smith	568	17.1	+14.2
Alliance (Liberal)	Stephen Pearson	524	15.7	N/A
Alliance (Liberal)	Anthony Zotti	484	14.5	N/A
Turnout		3,327	43.2	−0.8
Conservative hold		Swing		
Conservative gain from Labour		Swing		
Conservative gain from Labour		Swing		

Frederick Neuner was a sitting councillor for Bowes Park ward.

== By-elections ==
Harringay by-election, 20 October 1983
Party	Candidate	Votes	%	±%
Labour	Donald Billingsley	1,345	55.2	−2.6
Conservative	Christine Sampson	749	30.7	+9.6
Alliance	Kevin Twaite	344	14.1	−1.5
Turnout			34.8	
Labour hold		Swing		

The by-election was called following the resignation of Cllr Jeremy Corbyn.

Alexandra by-election, 12 April 1984
Party	Candidate	Votes	%	±%
Labour	Sharon Lawrence	1,375	39.8	+12.1
Conservative	Diana Bannister	1,133	32.8	−8.8
Alliance	Elizabeth Harrington	918	26.6	+0.4
Independent	Georgia Adamides	15	0.4	N/A
Independent	Audrey O'Dell	15	0.4	N/A
Turnout			49.4	
Labour gain from Conservative		Swing		

The by-election was called following the resignation of Cllr Cecil Baylis.

Archway by-election, 12 April 1984
Party	Candidate	Votes	%	±%
Labour	Clive Boutle	881	39.5	+12.4
Conservative	Andrew Mitchell	859	38.5	−5.0
Alliance	Sheila Smith	411	18.4	−6.9
Ecology	Paul Butler	57	2.6	−0.5
Ind. Conservative	Walter Hurry	17	0.8	N/A
Independent	Ron Aitken	8	0.4	N/A
Turnout			45.2	
Labour gain from Conservative		Swing		

The by-election was called following the resignation of Cllr Alistair Burt.

Woodside by-election, 12 April 1984
Party	Candidate	Votes	%	±%
Labour	Jim Gardner	1,728	55.1	+18.6
Conservative	Dorothy Cowan	1,045	33.3	−8.2
Alliance	John Warren	362	11.5	−5.6
Turnout			43.2	
Labour gain from Conservative		Swing		

The by-election was called following the resignation of Cllr Eva Robinson.

Highgate by-election, 14 June 1984
Party	Candidate	Votes	%	±%
Conservative	Andrew Mitchell	1,265	56.6	+0.4
Labour	Barbara Simon	480	21.5	+10.4
Alliance	Barrie Cooper	446	20.0	−4.8
Ecology	Paul Butler	36	1.6	N/A
Independent	Darren Borkhataria	7	0.3	N/A
Turnout			46.3	
Conservative hold		Swing		

The by-election was called following the resignation of Cllr Anthony Dignum.

White Hart Lane by-election, 25 October 1984
Party	Candidate	Votes	%	±%
Labour	Max Morris	1,291	51.7	+10.9
Conservative	Frank Kuhl	848	33.9	−0.6
Alliance	Kenneth Shepherd	338	13.5	−1.8
Ecology	Jon White	21	0.8	N/A
Turnout			34.1	
Labour hold		Swing		

The by-election was called following the resignation of Cllr Collin Ware.

Coleraine by-election, 15 November 1984
Party	Candidate	Votes	%	±%
Labour	Stephen Banerji	1,208	45.5	+4.0
Alliance	Alexander L'Estrange	952	35.8	+17.2
Conservative	Mary Callan	453	17.1	−16.3
Ecology	David Burns	43	1.6	N/A
Turnout			35.6	
Labour hold		Swing		

The by-election was called following the resignation of Cllr Anthony Rigby.

Tottenham Central by-election, 17 January 1985
Party	Candidate	Votes	%	±%
Labour	David McCulloch	996	56.8	+4.3
Alliance	Philip Hawker	451	25.7	+11.5
Conservative	Terence Wise	306	17.5	−8.0
Turnout			24.3	
Labour hold		Swing		

The by-election was called following the resignation of Cllr Iris Cressey.
