= 1982 Wandsworth London Borough Council election =

The 1982 Wandsworth Council election took place on 6 May 1982 to elect members of Wandsworth London Borough Council in London, England. The whole council was up for election and the Conservative party stayed in overall control of the council.

== Background ==
Wandsworth had been under Conservative majority control since the borough's 1978 elections. According to the Greater London Council, ward boundaries changed in only one London borough between the 1978 and 1982 elections (Enfield), meaning the 1982 contest in Wandsworth was fought on the same ward boundaries as in 1978.

== Election result ==
Wandsworth's electorate at the election was 196,713, of whom 48.7% turned out to vote. The Conservative Party won 33 of the council's 61 seats, retaining its majority, while Labour won 25 seats. Across the borough, the Conservatives took 42.7% of the vote, Labour took 38.1%, and the SDP–Liberal Alliance took 18.8% .

== Ward results ==
Balham (3)
Party	Candidate	Votes	%	±%
Conservative	David Goddard	2,140		
Conservative	Jeanette Gaffney	2,129		
Conservative	Frederick Rosier	2,049		
Labour	Patrick Roche	1,533		
Labour	William Burrow	1,514		
Labour	Martin Tupper	1,455		
Alliance	Paul Harrison	679		
Alliance	Peter Style	585		
Alliance	Beryl Urquhart	584		

Bedford (3)
Party	Candidate	Votes	%	±%
Conservative	John M. Rattray	1,774		
Labour	Paul Daniel	1,741		
Conservative	Lois M. Lees	1,697		
Conservative	Shirley A. Loader	1,688		
Labour	Richard A. Clayton	1,590		
Labour	Bryan A. Symons	1,438		
Alliance	Penelope A. Cooper	662		
Alliance	John K. Holmes	614		
Alliance	Abdul Rashid	587		

Earlsfield (2)
Party	Candidate	Votes	%	±%
Labour	William Ballantine	1,360		
Alliance	Paul Boudace	1,138		
Alliance	David Patterson	1,067		
Labour	Susan Ward	1,057		
Conservative	Colin Dawe	958		
Conservative	Peter Atkinson	951		

East Putney (3)
Party	Candidate	Votes	%	±%
Conservative	Christopher Chope	2,928		
Conservative	James Fairrie	2,893		
Conservative	Christopher Flind	2,803		
Labour	Christine Blower	1,032		
Labour	Michael Freedman	1,017		
Alliance	Vanessa Giles	989		
Alliance	Francis Plowden	970		
Alliance	Jeremy Ambache	969		
Labour	Belinda Hindley	934		

Fairfield (2)
Party	Candidate	Votes	%	±%
Labour	Sean C. Creighton	1,315		
Labour	Julian P. Proudman	1,256		
Conservative	Gerald L. Goss	1,177		
Conservative	Christopher M.R. Wright	1,138		
Alliance	Martin J. Morris	419		
Alliance	Hareward R.G. Cooke	406		
	John M. Foster	51		

Furzedown (3)
Party	Candidate	Votes	%	±%
Conservative	Brian N. Prichard	1,846		
Conservative	Alfred C. Jessiman	1,825		
Conservative	Sidney J.H.W. Morris	1,775		
Labour	John W. Gibbins	1,741		
Labour	Lilias G. Gillies	1,699		
Labour	Frank E. Sims	1,693		
Alliance	Anthony J. Pittman	836		
Alliance	Robert A. Nolan	774		
Alliance	Jacqueline J. Whitaker	772		
	Elizabeth M. Shaw	120		

Graveney (3)
Party	Candidate	Votes	%	±%
Labour	Duncan E. Braithwaite	1,748		
Labour	Charlotte J.S. Atkins	1,640		
Labour	Judith M. Chegwidden	1,526		
Conservative	Albert V. Mascull	1,168		
Conservative	Doreen F. Smith	1,165		
Conservative	Frederick J. Smith	1,054		
Alliance	Mary J.M. Budd	642		
Alliance	John G. Cole	575		
Alliance	Bruce J. Clelland	539		
	Roderick S. George	58		

Latchmere (3)
Party	Candidate	Votes	%	±%
Labour	Antony J. Belton	1,826		
Labour	Michael L. Barley	1,749		
Labour	Alan McGarvey	1,733		
Conservative	William A.A. Wells	518		
Conservative	Jeremy R.C. Quitman	507		
Conservative	John G.B. Heait	491		
Alliance	Michael J. Delaney	368		
Alliance	Sheila E. Kemp	336		
Alliance	Ian H. Willis	327		
	Michael J. Salt	112		
	Vernon C. Atkinson	104		
	Richard De Jongh-Wagenaar	89		

Nightingale (3)
Party	Candidate	Votes	%	±%
Conservative	Peter D. Donoghue	2,259		
Conservative	Maurice A.S. Heaster	2,176		
Conservative	Ravindra P. Govindia	2,099		
Labour	Gulsar A. Butt	1,405		
Labour	Charlotte E. Keresey	1,330		
Labour	Christopher A. Purnell	1,304		
Alliance	Richard F.J. Heron	872		
Alliance	Cyril S. Pickard	827		
Alliance	Catherine E. Bancutt	794		

Northcote (3)
Party	Candidate	Votes	%	±%
Conservative	Martin D. Johnson	2,401		
Conservative	Andrew G. Grant	2,354		
Conservative	Gordon S. Passmore	2,312		
Labour	Bernard W.A. Kirby	1,360		
Labour	Barbara M. Roche	1,306		
Labour	Donald J. Roy	1,272		
Alliance	Martin B. Constable	880		
Alliance	Charles S. Welchman	874		
Alliance	Richard Jones	863		
	Frances R. Baillie-Crossman	122		

Parkside (2)
Party	Candidate	Votes	%	±%
Conservative	Arnold J. Cooper	1,676		
Conservative	Josephine L. Sedgwick	1,600		
Labour	Leonard W. Holmes	1,233		
Labour	Jeremy P.T. Irwin-Slinger	1,068		
Alliance	Gerard E.D. Bonham-Carter	623		
Alliance	Elizabeth Al Qadhi	525		

Queenstown (2)
Party	Candidate	Votes	%	±%
Labour	Margaret A. Jenkins	1,164		
Labour	Ronald H.C. Simms	1,052		
Conservative	Edward P.G. Hay	930		
Conservative	Alan Babington-Smith	840		
Alliance	John T. Hughes	383		
Alliance	Graham Jones	348		
	Paul W. Ekins	47		
	Susan A. Lofthouse	41		

Roehampton (3)
Party	Candidate	Votes	%	±%
Labour	Michael R. Williams	2,413		
	John A. Slater	2,284		
	Vera Thompson	2,179		
Conservative	Beatrice E. Hollowood	1,088		
Conservative	Beryl Jeffery	1,087		
Conservative	David J.K. Rigg	1,077		
Alliance	Colin G. Darracott	1,068		
Alliance	Jeremy R.L. Loud	1,030		
Alliance	Elizabeth Brabazon	949		

St John (3)
Party	Candidate	Votes	%	±%
Labour	Samuel J. Jeffers	1,719		
Labour	Frank J. Ingram	1,675		
Labour	Richard G.W. Twining	1,606		
Alliance	Andrew J. Cunningham	929		
Conservative	Vincent Chang	867		
Alliance	Laura A. Collins	815		
Alliance	James G. Caple	758		

St Mary's Park (3)
Party	Candidate	Votes	%	±%
Labour	Priscilla Cornwall-Jones	1,725		
Labour	Stuart H.J. Hercock	1,613		
Labour	Patricia Benians	1,543		
Conservative	Martha E. Romilly	1,516		
Conservative	David P.G. Thompson	1,497		
Conservative	Robin J.P. Wheatley	1,481		
Alliance	Florence C. Coney	609		
Alliance	Andrew D. Wiles	484		
Alliance	Martin Stott	478		
	Sonia G. Willington	126		

Shaftesbury (3)
Party	Candidate	Votes	%	±%
Labour	Herbert J. Harrison	1,963		
Labour	William R. Johnston	1,856		
Labour	Francis H. Jones	1,816		
Conservative	Andrew R. Hargreaves	1,680		
Conservative	Edmund R. Hayward	1,612		
Conservative	Charles J. Karpinski	1,561		
Alliance	Robert Neville-Jones	864		
Alliance	David R. Owen-Jones	841		
Alliance	Peter Brook	814		
	Clarence G. Wilson	45		

Southfield (3)
Party	Candidate	Votes	%	±%
Conservative	Peter Slater	2,368		
Conservative	Michael J. Burnett	2,361		
Conservative	Christine A.K. Thompson	2,265		
Labour	Margaret Jones	1,646		
Labour	Teresa M.K. Smallbone	1,590		
	Michael J. Gapes	1,474		
Alliance	Gareth W. Campbell	896		
Alliance	Hamish J. Clifton	887		
Alliance	John N. Summerscale	842		

Springfield (3)
Party	Candidate	Votes	%	±%
Conservative	John R. Garrett	2,509		
Conservative	James C.M.L. Crawford	2,470		
Conservative	Francis A. Staff	2,398		
Labour	Paul C. Flather	1,568		
Labour	Marcia J. Davies	1,568		
Labour	Philip A. Morris	1,524		
Alliance	Mary T. Butterworth	913		
Alliance	David Robertson	853		
Alliance	Gerard A. Walter	844		

Thamesfield (3)
Party	Candidate	Votes	%	±%
Conservative	Peter J. Bingle	2,913		
Conservative	Alexander P. Beresford	2,869		
Conservative	Edward J.U. Lister	2,807		
Labour	Stephen Mannering	1,324		
Labour	David Packham	1,311		
Labour	Kathryn H. Pick	1,270		
Alliance	Jeremy G. Burgoyne	1,130		
Alliance	Michael I. Burrell	1,066		
Alliance	Peter S. Norman	1,027		

Tooting (3)
Party	Candidate	Votes	%	±%
Labour	Nicholas P. Adams	1,981		
Labour	Bernard J. Rosewell	1,934		
Labour	Vibert C. Luthers	1,871		
Conservative	William J. Kennett	1,431		
Conservative	Susan A. Kennett	1,398		
Conservative	Trevor W. Mundy	1,346		
Alliance	Patricia M. Singleton	576		
Alliance	Mirza M.J. Bukht	557		
Alliance	Paul F. Smales	540		
	Robert E. Lewis	159		

West Hill (2)
Party	Candidate	Votes	%	±%
Conservative	Richard S. Hickmet	1,548		
Conservative	Heather K. Wilkinson	1,538		
Labour	Dora Holmes	1,195		
Labour	Lindsay N. Thomas	1,080		
Alliance	Steven E. Bird	698		
Alliance	Richard I.M. Fife	669		

West Putney (3)
Party	Candidate	Votes	%	±%
Conservative	Brian J. Edgington	2,784		
Conservative	Margaret E. Calcott-James	2,756		
Conservative	Mary M. Holben	2,688		
Labour	Marlene S. Heron	1,585		
Labour	Margaret R. Blake	1,562		
Labour	Anne C. Towner	1,500		
Alliance	Nicholas M.H. Jones	987		
Alliance	Denise F. Couzens	975		
Alliance	Jane L. Macgregor	940		
	David J. Wesh	156		
