= 1986 London local elections =

- 8 May 1986

All 1,914 on all 32 London boroughs
- Turnout: 45.5%
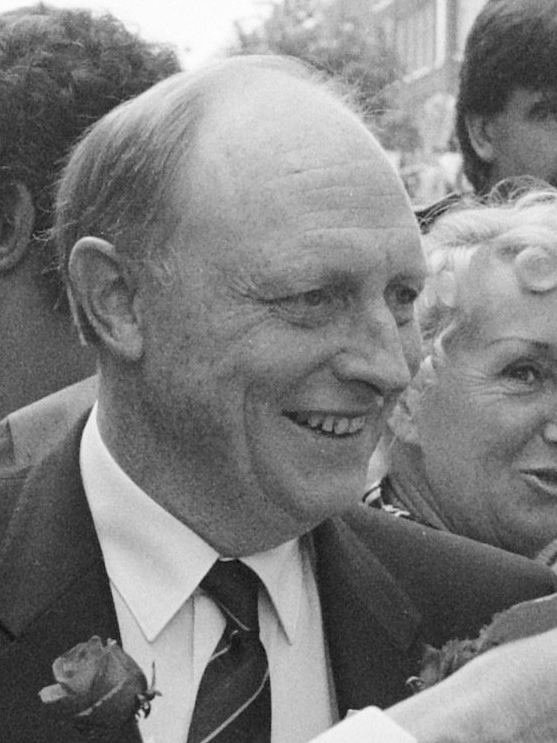

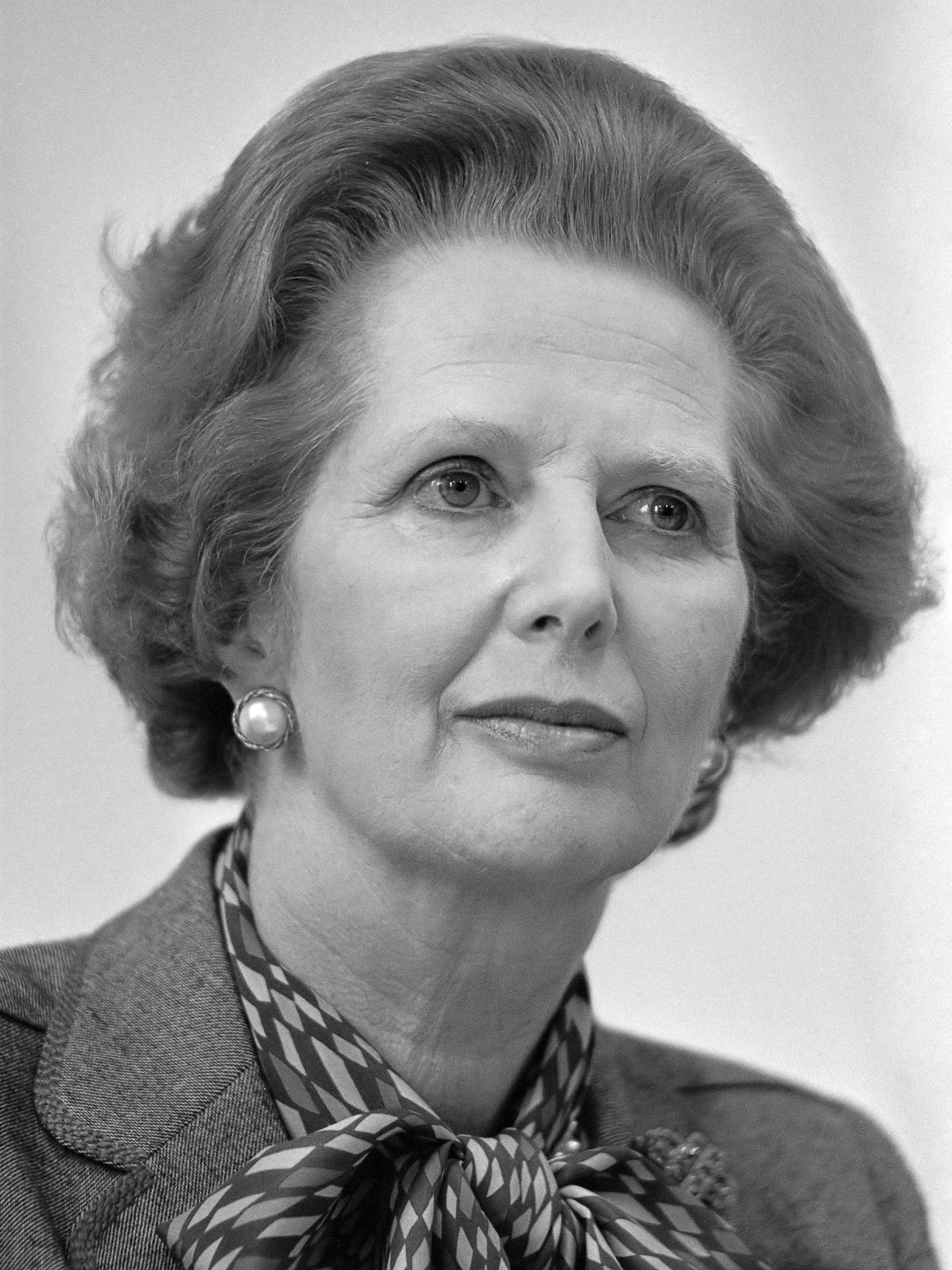

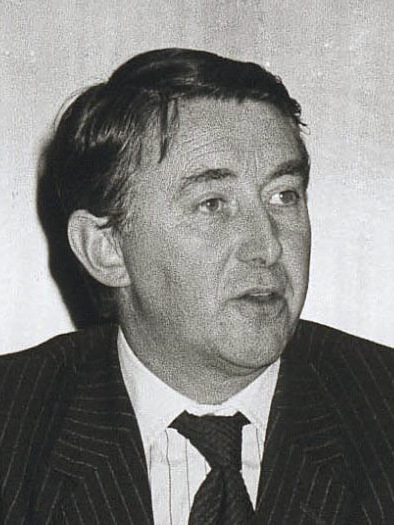

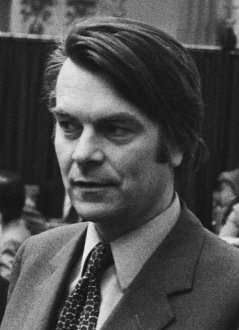
| | First party | Second party | Third party |
|---|---|---|---|
| Leader | Neil Kinnock | Margaret Thatcher | David Steel (Lib.); David Owen (SDP) |
| Party | Labour | Conservative | SDP–Liberal Alliance |
| Leader since | 2 October 1983 | 11 February 1975 | 1976 (Steel), 1983 (Owen) |
| Popular vote | 842,489 | 798,398 | 539,848 |
| Percentage | 37.4% | 35.4% | 24.0% |
| Swing | ▲7.2% | ▼6.8% | ▼0.6% |
| Councils | 15 | 11 | 3 |
| Councils +/– | ▲3 | ▼6 | ▲3 |
| Councillors | 957 | 685 | 249 |
| Councillors +/– | ▲176 | ▼300 | ▲125 |
- Results by Borough in 1986.

Local government elections took place in London, and some other parts of the United Kingdom on Thursday 8 May 1986.

All London borough council seats were up for election. The previous Borough elections in London were in 1982. The Labour Party won the most votes and seats in London for the first time since 1974. The party won the most seats in London in 7 out of the next 8 elections.

== Results summary ==
| Party | Votes won | % votes | Change | Seats | % seats | Change | Councils | Change |
|---|---|---|---|---|---|---|---|---|
| Labour | 842,489 | 37.4 | +7.2 | 957 | 50.0 | +176 | 15 | +3 |
| Conservative | 798,398 | 35.4 | -6.8 | 684 | 35.7 | -300 | 11 | -6 |
| Alliance | 539,848 | 24.0 | -0.6 | 249 | 13.0 | +125 | 3 | +3 |
| Others | 72,269 | 3.2 | +0.2 | 24 | 1.3 | -1 | 0 | ±0 |
| No overall control | n/a | n/a | n/a | n/a | n/a | n/a | 3 | ±0 |

- Turnout: 2,312,939 voters cast ballots (45.5%).

== Council results ==
| Council | Previous control | Result | Details |
|---|---|---|---|
| Barking and Dagenham | Labour | Labour | Details |
| Barnet | Conservative | Conservative | Details |
| Bexley | Conservative | Conservative | Details |
| Brent | Labour | Labour | Details |
| Bromley | Conservative | Conservative | Details |
| Camden | Labour | Labour | Details |
| Croydon | Conservative | Conservative | Details |
| Ealing | Conservative | Labour | Details |
| Enfield | Conservative | Conservative | Details |
| Greenwich | Labour | Labour | Details |
| Hackney | Labour | Labour | Details |
| Hammersmith and Fulham | No overall control | Labour | Details |
| Haringey | Labour | Labour | Details |
| Harrow | Conservative | Conservative | Details |
| Havering | Conservative | No overall control | Details |
| Hillingdon | Conservative | No overall control | Details |
| Hounslow | Labour | Labour | Details |
| Islington | Labour | Labour | Details |
| Kensington and Chelsea | Conservative | Conservative | Details |
| Kingston upon Thames | Conservative | No overall control | Details |
| Lambeth | No overall control | Labour | Details |
| Lewisham | Labour | Labour | Details |
| Merton | Conservative | Conservative | Details |
| Newham | Labour | Labour | Details |
| Redbridge | Conservative | Conservative | Details |
| Richmond upon Thames | Conservative | Liberal | Details |
| Southwark | Labour | Labour | Details |
| Sutton | Conservative | Liberal | Details |
| Tower Hamlets | Labour | Liberal | Details |
| Waltham Forest | No overall control | Labour | Details |
| Wandsworth | Conservative | Conservative | Details |
| Westminster | Conservative | Conservative | Details |

== Overall councillor numbers ==
London local elections 1986 Councillor statistics
| Party | Seats | Gain/loss |
|---|---|---|
| Labour | 957 | +176 |
| Conservative | 684 | -300 |
| Alliance | 249 | +125 |
| Others | 24 | -1 |

== Borough result maps ==
Barnet 1986 results map

Camden 1986 results map

Hammersmith and Fulham 1986 results map
