= Cannon Hill (ward) =

Electoral ward in London, England

- Electoral ward for the Merton London Borough Council
- Cannon Hill ward boundaries since 2022
- Borough: Merton
- County: Greater London
- Population: 9,791 (2021) (Note: 2021 Census data reported for 2022 ward boundaries)
- Electorate: 7,256 (2022)
- Major settlements: Cannon Hill
- Area: 2.225 square kilometres (0.859 sq mi)

Current electoral ward
- Created: 1965
- Number of members: 1965–1978: 4; 1978–present: 3
- Councillors: Nicholas McLean; Vacancy; Michael Paterson
- GSS code: E05000456 (2002–2022); E05013811 (2022–present)

Cannon Hill is an electoral ward in the London Borough of Merton. The ward was first used in the 1964 elections and elects three councillors to Merton London Borough Council.

== List of councillors ==
Seat	Councillor	Took office	Left office	Party	Election
1	W. Castle	1964	1971	Conservative	1964, 1968
2	Iris Derriman	1964	1982	Conservative	1964, 1968, 1971, 1974, 1978
3	I. Leivers	1964	1971	Conservative	1964, 1968
4	N. Obee	1964	1968	Conservative	1964
4	R. Stucley-Lucas	1968	1971	Conservative	1968
1	P. Jones	1971	1974	Labour	1971
3	D. Connellan	1971	1974	Labour	1971
4	W. Dunne	1971	1974	Labour	1971
1	David Williams	1974	1987	Conservative	1974, 1978, 1982
3	Alfred Leivers	1974	1986	Conservative	1974, 1978, 1982
4	A. Moore	1974	1975	Conservative	1974
4	Peggy Rowell	1975	1978	Liberal	1975
2	Joan Pethen	1982	1994	Conservative	1982
3	Thelma Earnshaw	1986	1994	Conservative	1986, 1990
1	John Ratcliffe	1987	1990	Conservative	1987
1	Colin McCaul	1990	1994	Conservative	1990
1	Michael Mannion	1994	2002	Labour	1994, 1998
2	Brian White	1994	2002	Labour	1994, 1998
3	Charles Lucas	1994	2002	Labour	1994, 1998
1	Deborah Shears	2002	2014	Conservative	2002, 2006, 2010
2	Fiona Bryce	2002	2006	Conservative	2002
3	Brian Lewis-Lavender	2002	2006	Conservative	2002
2	William Brierly	2006	2010	Conservative	2006
3	Brian Lewis-Lavender	2006	2010	Conservative	2006
2	Miles Windsor	2010	2014	Conservative	2010
3	Logie Lohendran	2010	2014	Conservative	2010
1	Tobin Byers	2014	2018	Labour	2014
2	Pauline Cowper	2014	2022	Labour	2014, 2018
3	Fidelis Gadzama	2014	2018	Labour	2014
1	Nicholas McLean	2018	Incumbent	Conservative	2018, 2022
3	Mark Kenny	2018	2019	Labour	2018
3	Jenifer Gould	2019	2026	Liberal Democrats	2019, 2022
2	Michael Paterson	2022	Incumbent	Conservative	2022

== Merton council elections since 2022 ==
Cannon Hill ward boundaries between 2002 and 2022

There was a revision of ward boundaries in Merton in 2022.

=== 2026 election ===
Jennifer Gould resigned in January 2026, with the by-election deferred until May 2026. (Note: Casual vacancies occurring within six months of scheduled elections are not filled.)

=== 2022 election ===
The election took place on 5 May 2022.

2022 Merton London Borough Council election: Cannon Hill (3)
Party	Candidate	Votes	%	±%
Liberal Democrats	Jennifer Gould	1,329	36.7	N/A
Conservative	Nicholas McLean	1,263	34.9	N/A
Conservative	Michael Paterson	1,193	32.9	N/A
Liberal Democrats	Asif Ashraf	1,168	32.3	N/A
Conservative	Frank Pocock	1,140	31.5	N/A
Liberal Democrats	Richard Poole	1,129	31.2	N/A
Labour	Dave Barnes	1,049	29.0	N/A
Labour	Pauline Cowper	984	27.2	N/A
Labour	Ryan Barnett	977	27.0	N/A
Green	Jae Henderson	299	8.3	N/A
Turnout		3,621	49.9	
Liberal Democrats win (new boundaries)				
Conservative win (new boundaries)				
Conservative win (new boundaries)				

== 2002–2022 Merton council elections ==
Cannon Hill ward boundaries between 2002 and 2022

There was a revision of ward boundaries in Merton in 2002.

=== 2019 by-election ===
The by-election took place on 20 June 2019, following the resignation of Mark Kenny.

2019 Cannon Hill by-election
Party	Candidate	Votes	%	±%
Liberal Democrats	Jenifer Gould	1,060	35.0	+24.3
Labour	Ryan Barnett	876	28.9	−13.9
Conservative	Michael Paterson	867	28.6	−14.2
Green	Susie O'Connor	158	5.2	+5.2
UKIP	Andrew Mills	68	2.2	−1.4
Majority		184	6.1	
Turnout		2,030	41.8	
Liberal Democrats gain from Labour		Swing	+19.1	

=== 2018 election ===
The election took place on 3 May 2018.

2018 Merton London Borough Council election: Cannon Hill (3)
Party	Candidate	Votes	%	±%
Conservative	Nicholas McLean	1,644	45.2	+10.1
Labour	Pauline Cowper	1,642	45.1	−2.4
Labour	Mark Kenny	1,636	44.9	−3.3
Conservative	Michael Paterson	1,562	42.9	+9.9
Labour	Muhammod Rahman	1,445	39.7	−4.8
Conservative	Harry Todd	1,406	38.6	+7.7
Liberal Democrats	Geoff Cooper	411	11.3	+4.0
Liberal Democrats	Klaar Dresselaers	313	8.6	+2.1
Liberal Democrats	Cosette Malik	303	8.3	+4.6
UKIP	Andrew Mills	141	3.9	−10.3
Turnout		3,649	50	
Conservative gain from Labour		Swing		
Labour hold		Swing		
Labour hold		Swing		

=== 2014 election ===
The election took place on 22 May 2014.

2014 Merton London Borough Council election: Cannon Hill (3)
Party	Candidate	Votes	%	±%
Labour	Tobin Byers	1,686	48.2	+21.0
Labour	Pauline Cowper	1,661	47.5	+8.0
Labour	Fidelis Gadzama	1,556	44.5	+7.2
Conservative	Debbie Shears	1,227	35.1	−8.9
Conservative	Omar Bush	1,153	33.0	−6.5
Conservative	Logie Lohendran	1,081	30.9	−6.4
UKIP	Andrew Mills	597	14.2	N/A
Liberal Democrats	Andrew Cope	254	7.3	−16.7
Liberal Democrats	Vivian MacVeigh	227	6.5	−14.6
Liberal Democrats	Cosette Malik	131	3.7	−16.5
Turnout			49.3	
Labour gain from Conservative		Swing		
Labour gain from Conservative		Swing		
Labour gain from Conservative		Swing		

=== 2010 election ===
The election on 6 May 2010 took place on the same day as the United Kingdom general election.

2010 Merton London Borough Council election: Cannon Hill (3)
Party	Candidate	Votes	%	±%
Conservative	Deborah Shears	2,195	44.0	−9.7
Conservative	Miles Windsor	1,967	39.5	−15.1
Conservative	Logie Lohendran	1,860	37.3	−14.4
Labour	Leslie Boodram	1,355	27.2	+2.2
Liberal Democrats	Helen Carter	1,195	24.0	+10.2
Labour	Shelley McNicol	1,169	23.5	−1.5
Labour	Aejaz Khanzada	1,094	22.0	+1.2
Liberal Democrats	Hazel Rutledge	1,050	21.1	+8.1
Liberal Democrats	Barrie Lambert	1,007	20.2	+8.1
Independent	Ray Skinner	498	10.0	N/A
BNP	Paul Laws	378	7.6	N/A
CPA	Samuel Jayakrishna	149	3.0	N/A
Turnout		4,983	71.2	
Conservative hold		Swing		
Conservative hold		Swing		
Conservative hold		Swing		

=== 2006 election ===
The election took place on 4 May 2006.

2006 Merton London Borough Council election: Cannon Hill (3)
Party	Candidate	Votes	%	±%
Conservative	William Brierly	1,778	54.6	+8.8
Conservative	Deborah Shears	1,748	53.7	+6.0
Conservative	Brian Lewis-Lavender	1,681	51.7	+8.1
Labour	Christopher Houghton	814	25.0	−5.5
Labour	Henry Macauley	812	25.0	−2.4
Labour	Motiur Rahman	678	20.8	−6.0
Liberal Democrats	Mary O'Herlihy Nixon	450	13.8	+1.8
Liberal Democrats	Nelson Menezes	423	13.0	+1.6
Liberal Democrats	Christopher Oxford	416	12.8	+1.9
Pensioners Action Alliance	Michael Fitzgerald	383	11.8	N/A
Turnout		3,254	47.1	+4.2
Conservative hold		Swing		
Conservative hold		Swing		
Conservative hold		Swing		

=== 2002 election ===
The election took place on 2 May 2002.

2002 Merton London Borough Council election: Cannon Hill (3)
Party	Candidate	Votes	%	±%
Conservative	Deborah Shears	1,396	47.7	
Conservative	Fiona Bryce	1,341	45.8	
Conservative	David Shellhorn	1,277	43.6	
Labour	Stephen Alambritis	893	30.5	
Labour	Henry MacAuley	803	27.4	
Labour	Charles Lucas	785	26.8	
Liberal Democrats	Blaise Eglington	351	12.0	
Liberal Democrats	Michael Spalding	333	11.4	
Liberal Democrats	Richard Ladmore	319	10.9	
Independent	Despina Steiert	215	7.3	
UKIP	Graham Mills	175	6.0	
Green	Francis Cluer	153	5.2	
Green	Catherine Fallowfield	119	4.1	
Green	Giles Fallowfield	98	3.3	
Turnout		2,928	42.9	
Conservative win (new boundaries)				
Conservative win (new boundaries)				
Conservative win (new boundaries)				

== 1978–2002 Merton council elections ==
Cannon Hill ward boundaries between 1978 and 2002

There was a revision of ward boundaries in Merton in 1978. The number of councillors returned was reduced from four to three.

=== 1998 election ===
The election on 7 May 1998 took place on the same day as the 1998 Greater London Authority referendum.

1998 Merton London Borough Council election: Cannon Hill (3)
Party	Candidate	Votes	%	±%
Labour	Michael Mannion	1,354	44.64	▼1.71
Labour	Brian White	1,308		
Labour	Charles Lucas	1,269		
Conservative	Michael Grundy	1,090	36.77	▲3.61
Conservative	David Gillmor	1,088		
Conservative	Joan Pethen	1,060		
Liberal Democrats	Peter Larkin	459	12.94	▼2.25
Liberal Democrats	Christopher Oxford	352		
Liberal Democrats	Mark Surey	329		
Green	John Barker	166	5.65	▲0.35
Registered electors		6,669		▲39
Turnout		3,047	45.69	▼7.81
Rejected ballots		4	0.13	▲0.05
Labour hold		Swing		
Labour hold		Swing		
Labour hold		Swing		

=== 1994 election ===
The election took place on 5 May 1994.

1994 Merton London Borough Council election: Cannon Hill (3)
Party	Candidate	Votes	%	±%
Labour	Michael Mannion	1,631	46.35	▲8.98
Labour	Charles Lucas	1,611		
Labour	Brian White	1,608		
Conservative	Thelma Earnshaw	1,195	33.16	▼15.87
Conservative	Joan Pethen	1,146		
Conservative	Pauline Blythe	1,130		
Liberal Democrats	Peter Larkin	556	15.19	▲1.59
Liberal Democrats	Anne-Marie Anderson	533		
Liberal Democrats	George Senior	502		
Green	Justin Craig	185	5.30	New
Registered electors		6,630		▼58
Turnout		3,547	53.50	▼6.16
Rejected ballots		3	0.08	▼0.10
Labour gain from Conservative		Swing		
Labour gain from Conservative		Swing		
Labour gain from Conservative		Swing		

=== 1990 election ===
The election took place on 3 May 1990.

1990 Merton London Borough Council election: Cannon Hill (3)
Party	Candidate	Votes	%	±%
Conservative	Thelma Earnshaw	1,900	49.03	
Conservative	Joan Pethen	1,880		
Conservative	Colin McCaul	1,834		
Labour	David Chapman	1,448	37.37	
Labour	Geoffrey Lightfoot	1,447		
Labour	Brian White	1,382		
Liberal Democrats	Peter Larkin	563	13.60	
Liberal Democrats	Patricia Pearce	504		
Liberal Democrats	Stephen van Dulken	490		
Registered electors		6,688		
Turnout		3,990	59.66	
Rejected ballots		7	0.18	
Conservative hold		Swing		
Conservative hold		Swing		
Conservative hold		Swing		

=== 1987 by-election ===
The by-election took place on 26 November 1987, following the resignation of David Williams.

1987 Cannon Hill by-election
Party	Candidate	Votes	%	±%
Conservative	John Ratcliffe	1,711	57.0	
Labour	Paula Burnett	990	33.0	
Alliance	Neil Rennie	300	10.0	
Turnout			43.3	
Conservative hold		Swing		

=== 1986 election ===
The election took place on 8 May 1986.

=== 1982 election ===
The election took place on 6 May 1982.

=== 1978 election ===
The election took place on 4 May 1978.

== 1964–1978 Merton council elections ==
External image
- Map showing Cannon Hill ward boundaries from 1965 to 1978

=== 1975 by-election ===
The by-election took place on 30 October 1975.

1975 Cannon Hill by-election
Party	Candidate	Votes	%	±%
Liberal	Peggy Rowell	1,955		
Conservative	Anthony Owen	1,710		
Labour	Philip Jones	765		
Air Road Public Safety White Resident	Bill Boaks	7		
Turnout			45.5	
Liberal gain from Conservative		Swing		

=== 1974 election ===
The election took place on 2 May 1974.

=== 1971 election ===
The election took place on 13 May 1971.

=== 1968 election ===
The election took place on 9 May 1968.

=== 1964 election ===
The election took place on 7 May 1964.
