= Cannon Hill =

Cannon Hill may refer to any of the following places:

== Australia ==
- Cannon Hill, Northern Territory, a tiny outstation in Arnhem Land
- Cannon Hill, Queensland, a suburb of Brisbane
  - Cannon Hill Anglican College
  - Cannon Hill bus station
  - Cannon Hill railway station
  - Cannon Hill State School

== United Kingdom ==
- Cannon Hill Park, Birmingham
- Cannon Hill, Merton, a suburb of London
  - Cannon Hill Common
  - Cannon Hill tube station
  - Cannon Hill (ward)
