= CERC =

CERC or Cerc may refer to:

== Places ==
- Cers, Hérault, France (Occitan: Cèrç)
- Cerc, a village in Valea Ierii, Transylvania, Romania
- Cerc, a village in Oltrona di San Mamette, Lombardy, Italy

== Other uses ==
- Central Electricity Regulatory Commission, a key regulator of power sector in India
- CERC, the proteins Cab-45, reticulocalbin, Erc-55 (RCN2), and calumenin
- Center for Environmental Research and Conservation, now Earth Institute Center for Environmental Sustainability
- Consumer Education and Research Center in India, a consumer movement organisation
- California Energy Research Center, at California State University, Bakersfield
- US–China Clean Energy Research Center, a joint research which existed across multiple research institutions in both China and the United States.

== See also ==
- Cercs, a municipality in Berguedà, Catalonia
- Rislenemdaz, developmental code name CERC-301, a drug for treatment-resistant depression
- Aticaprant, developmental codes CERC-501, a drug for the treatment of major depressive disorder
