= Tony Colman =

Tony Colman may refer to:

- Tony Colman (politician), Labour Party politician and MP
- Tony Colman (musician), drum and bass producer, co-founder of London Elektricity and Hospital Records
