= Fidelis Gadzama =

Nigerian sprinter

Member of Merton London Borough Council for Cannon Hill
- In office 2014–2018

Personal details
- Born: 20 October 1979 (age 46)
- Party: Labour
- Sports career
Medal record
Men's athletics
Representing Nigeria
Olympic Games
Gold medal – first place	2000 Sydney	4×400 m
African Championships
Bronze medal – third place	1998 Dakar	4×400 m

Fidelis Gadzama (born 20 October 1979) is a Nigerian athlete and Olympic medalist.

Gadzama was a part of the Nigerian team that received a silver medal in the 4 × 400 metres relay at the 2000 Olympics in Sydney.

The Nigerian team finished second behind the US team, which has later been formally disqualified from the 4 × 400 meters relay event at the 2000 Olympics by the International Olympic Committee, due to one of the team members' use of illegal performance-enhancing drugs while competing in Sydney.

On 21 July 2012, the 2000 Olympics 4 × 400 m relay medals were reallocated after the USA team was stripped of the gold medal, meaning Gadzama and Nigeria are the gold medalists.

In May 2014, he was elected as a Labour Party Merton London Borough Councillor for Cannon Hill.
