= 2018 Merton London Borough Council election =

2018 local election in England

- 3 May 2018

All 60 council seats on Merton London Borough Council

	First party	Second party
Party	Labour	Conservative
Last election	36 seats, 49.6%	20 seats, 31.6%
Seats won	34	17
Seat change	▼2	▼3
Popular vote	83,890	56,223
Percentage	46.9%	31.5%
Swing	▼2.7%	▼0.1%
	Third party	Fourth party
Party	Liberal Democrats	Merton Park RA
Last election	1 seat, 8.9%	3 seats, 3.7%
Seats won	6	3
Seat change	▲5	Steady
Popular vote	26,158	5,898
Percentage	14.6%	3.3%
Swing	▲5.7%	▼0.4%
- Map of the results of the 2018 Merton council election. Conservatives in blue, Labour in red, Liberal Democrats in yellow and Merton Park Ward Residents Association in white.
Council leader before election
Stephen Alambritis
Labour
Council leader after
election
Stephen Alambritis
Labour

Elections for the London Borough of Merton were held on 3 May 2018 to elect members of Merton London Borough Council in England. This was on the same day as other local elections in England.

== Campaign ==
In February 2018, Peter Walker, a former Labour councillor for Figges Marsh who was suspended by the party in October 2017, claimed that the local Labour Party was excluding supporters of the national party leader, Jeremy Corbyn, from becoming councillors.

Labour pledged to complete the building of a new leisure centre, bring AFC Wimbledon's home grounds within Merton, consider the introduction of a landlord licensing scheme, establish targets for affordable housing and introduce 20 mph zones.

The Conservatives pledged to reintroduce weekly street cleaning, increase mobile CCTV, deliver a masterplan for Wimbledon, regenerate Morden, establish a 24/7 anti-social behaviour hotline, rebuild St Helier Hospital, introduce borough-wide anti-idling measures and reintroduce webcasting of council meetings.

The Liberal Democrats pledged to institute a target of 50% affordable housing in large developments, install more public bins and public drinking fountains, increase cycling infrastructure, introduce default 20 mph zones, make Raynes Park and Motspur Park railway stations fully accessible, replace the closed walk-in surgery in Mitcham, introduce a levy on planning developments to pay for local schools, scrap charges for the use of Council-owned parks and playing fields, develop incubator sites for start-ups and establish neighbourhood plans.

A key issue during the campaign was the proposed closure of Wimbledon police station by the Labour Mayor of London. The Conservatives proposed to buy the police station, while the Liberal Democrats supported a legal action against the closure. The legal action was brought by Paul Kohler, one of the successful Liberal Democrat candidates for Trinity in the election.

=== Demolition of Merton Hall ===
A key issue during the campaign was the partial demolition of the historic Merton Hall in South Wimbledon, which was given planning permission by the council in September 2017. Under the plans, the Elim Pentecostal Church would assume tenancy of Merton Hall after the year-long works, under the condition that the site could still be hired as a community space by local residents. Elim Church's current High Path site would then become a Harris Federation school hosting 1,200 students from September 2020.

A petition opposing the plans and calling on Historic England to list Merton Hall attracted over 4,000 signatures. The plans attracted national attention in March 2018 over concerns that Elim Church could seek to prevent LGBT groups from hiring Merton Hall. The Conservatives opposed the demolition plans and pledged to end the demolition works immediately if elected; they also alleged that the demolition broke pre-election purdah rules, given that it was using public money on a contentious issue. The Merton Park Ward Residents Association also expressed their regret over the council's plans; their councillors suggested alternative sites for the secondary school and questioned the extent of the demolition required.

The demolition works began in April 2018. In the election, the ward of Abbey, in which Merton Hall is situated, returned one Conservative councillor. After the election, responding to criticism of the plans, council leader Stephen Alambritis claimed that the council is building a brand new hall and not demolishing the existing one. Alambritis confirmed that two investigations were underway, one by the Local Government Ombudsman and another by Ernst and Young.

== Results ==
Labour retained its control of Merton Council, its majority reduced to four seats. The Conservatives gained two seats from Labour (one each in the wards of Cannon Hill and Abbey) and the Liberal Democrats gained five seats from the Conservatives (two in West Barnes, two in Dundonald and one in Trinity). The Merton Park Ward Residents Association maintained its three councillors in Merton Park. By seat count, this was the best ever election result for the Liberal Democrats in the borough, and the first time they had held council positions outside the West Barnes ward.

Paul Kohler, who achieved significant recognition after leading a legal campaign against the proposed closure of Wimbledon police station, was elected for the Liberal Democrats in Trinity. Two months after the election, his legal action resulted in a judgment that the decision to close the police station was unlawful.

Merton local election result 2018
Party	Seats	Gains	Losses	Net gain/loss	Seats %	Votes %	Votes	+/−
Labour	34	0	2	▼2	56.7	46.9	83,890	▼2.5%
Conservative	17	2	5	▼3	28.3	31.5	56,223	▼0.1%
Liberal Democrats	6	5	0	▲5	10.0	14.6	26,158	▲5.7%
Merton Park RA	3	0	0	0	5.0	3.3	5,898	▼0.4%
Green	0	0	0	0	0	2.8	4,970	▲1.3%
Independent	0	0	0	0	0	0.5	836	N/A
UKIP	0	0	0	0	0	0.3	459	▼3.3%
Democrats and Veterans	0	0	0	0	0	0.1	151	New
TUSC	0	0	0	0	0	0.0	77	▼0.1%
Duma Polska	0	0	0	0	0	0.0	33	New

On 11 May 2018, it was announced that the council's cabinet would be reshuffled. Mary Curtin, a Labour councillor for Lower Morden, was voted in as the council's new mayor at the Annual Council Meeting on 23 May 2018.

== Ward results ==
=== Abbey ===
Abbey
Party	Candidate	Votes	%	±%
Labour	Eleanor Stringer	1,476	42.8	−5.1
Conservative	Nigel Benbow	1,446	41.9	+7.1
Labour	Ben Butler	1,409	40.7	−7.1
Conservative	Emma-Louise Vetriano	1,399	40.6	+6.8
Conservative	Sivas Ranjan	1,383	40.1	+10.2
Labour	Dave Treanor	1,323	38.4	−8.1
Liberal Democrats	Matthew Payne	547	15.9	+7.2
Liberal Democrats	Barry Smith	464	13.5	+7.3
Liberal Democrats	Panos Topalis	419	12.1	+7.1
TUSC	Piero Miloro	77	2.2	N/A
Turnout		3,458	45	
Labour hold		Swing		
Conservative gain from Labour		Swing		
Labour hold		Swing		

=== Cannon Hill ===
Following the resignation of Mark Kenny, a by-election was held on 20 June 2019 with the Liberal Democrats gaining the seat.

Cannon Hill
Party	Candidate	Votes	%	±%
Conservative	Nicholas McLean	1,644	45.2	+10.1
Labour	Pauline Cowper*	1,642	45.1	−2.4
Labour	Mark Kenny	1,636	44.9	−3.3
Conservative	Michael Paterson	1,562	42.9	+9.9
Labour	Muhammod Rahman	1,445	39.7	−4.8
Conservative	Harry Todd	1,406	38.6	+7.7
Liberal Democrats	Geoff Cooper	411	11.3	+4.0
Liberal Democrats	Klaar Dresselaers	313	8.6	+2.1
Liberal Democrats	Cosette Malik	303	8.3	+4.6
UKIP	Andrew Mills	141	3.9	−10.3
Turnout		3,649	50	
Conservative gain from Labour		Swing		
Labour hold		Swing		
Labour hold		Swing		

=== Colliers Wood ===
Colliers Wood
Party	Candidate	Votes	%	±%
Labour	Laxmi Attawar*	1,908	63.1	+8.4
Labour	Caroline Cooper-Marbiah*	1,824	60.4	+3.8
Labour	Dave Ward	1,812	60.0	+0.5
Conservative	Max Austin	465	18.7	−3.9
Conservative	Sally Hammond	434	14.4	−7.3
Conservative	Krystal Miller	424	14.0	−6.5
Green	Kenneth Green	413	13.7	−4.6
Green	Harriet Edwards	389	12.9	N/A
Green	Charles Barraball	285	9.4	N/A
Liberal Democrats	Emily Robertson	232	7.7	−0.3
Liberal Democrats	Brigid Finlayson	206	6.8	−1.1
Liberal Democrats	Shipra Gupta	204	6.8	N/A
Turnout		3,028	38	
Labour hold		Swing		
Labour hold		Swing		
Labour hold		Swing		

=== Cricket Green ===
Cricket Green
Party	Candidate	Votes	%	±%
Labour	Rebecca Lanning	2,054	71.6	+2.3
Labour	Owen Pritchard	2,004	69.9	+3.6
Labour	Russell Makin*	1,994	69.5	+1.3
Conservative	Gary Watkinson	422	14.7	±0.0
Conservative	Linda Taylor (Note: Taylor had previously served as a Conservative councillor for the ward of Wimbledon Park between 2012 and 2018.)	407	14.2	+0.1
Conservative	Cesar Sepulveda	368	12.8	+1.0
Green	Christopher Stanton	249	8.7	N/A
Liberal Democrats	Claire Bolt	215	7.5	+2.9
Liberal Democrats	Guilliana Castle	189	6.6	N/A
Liberal Democrats	Vincent Bolt	159	5.5	N/A
Democrats and Veterans	Kay Evans	151	5.3	N/A
Turnout		2,881	34	
Labour hold		Swing		
Labour hold		Swing		
Labour hold		Swing		

=== Dundonald ===
Dundonald
Party	Candidate	Votes	%	±%
Liberal Democrats	Anthony Fairclough	1,576	44.9	+19.6
Liberal Democrats	Simon McGrath	1,389	39.6	+13.8
Conservative	David Dean*	1,361	38.8	−6.8
Conservative	Michael Bull*	1,301	37.1	−6.8
Liberal Democrats	John Tippett-Cooper	1,299	37.0	+11.7
Conservative	Suzanne Grocott*	1,284	36.6	−6.4
Labour	Wayne Busbridge	594	16.9	−4.1
Labour	Daniel Johnston	549	15.6	−9.0
Labour	Bupe Ngoy	517	14.7	−6.8
Green	David Wood	332	9.4	N/A
Turnout		3,515	51	
Liberal Democrats gain from Conservative		Swing		
Liberal Democrats gain from Conservative		Swing		
Conservative hold		Swing		

=== Figge’s Marsh ===
Figge's Marsh
Party	Candidate	Votes	%	±%
Labour	Agatha Akyigyina*	2,457	80.7	−0.3
Labour	Geraldine Stanford*	2,361	77.6	−0.2
Labour	Mike Brunt	2,313	76.0	+4.2
Conservative	Charlie Gregory	380	12.5	−1.8
Conservative	Hamish Badenoch	378	12.4	−0.3
Conservative	Marina Hardwick	369	12.1	+0.2
Liberal Democrats	David Busby-Cartwright-Owen	187	6.1	+0.2
Liberal Democrats	Eliane Patton	125	4.1	N/A
Liberal Democrats	Giorga Gamba	115	3.8	N/A
Turnout		3,058	36	
Labour hold		Swing		
Labour hold		Swing		
Labour hold		Swing		

=== Graveney ===
Graveney
Party	Candidate	Votes	%	±%
Labour	Linda Kirby*	2,181	80.5	+4.3
Labour	John Dehaney*	2,139	79.0	+0.6
Labour	Tobin Byers	2,080	76.8	+9.3
Conservative	Maureen Kyalya	324	12.0	−3.0
Conservative	Charlie Chirico	319	11.8	−1.6
Conservative	Thomas Moulton	304	11.2	−0.7
Liberal Democrats	Luke Taylor	246	9.1	+1.7
Liberal Democrats	Sarah Weber	179	6.6	−0.7
Liberal Democrats	Quresh Mukadam	149	5.5	N/A
Turnout		2,723	37	
Labour hold		Swing		
Labour hold		Swing		
Labour hold		Swing		

=== Hillside ===
Hillside
Party	Candidate	Votes	%	±%
Conservative	David Williams*	1,427	55.4	+4.7
Conservative	Daniel Holden*	1,425	55.3	+5.1
Conservative	David Simpson*	1,391	54.0	+2.2
Labour	Joseph Archer	614	23.8	−1.3
Labour	David Barnes	593	23.0	−0.9
Labour	Philip Jones	567	22.0	+0.9
Liberal Democrats	Samantha MacArthur	565	21.9	+4.0
Liberal Democrats	Richard Williams	491	19.1	+5.8
Liberal Democrats	Nicholas Sanders	435	16.9	+3.6
Turnout		2,583	40	
Conservative hold		Swing		
Conservative hold		Swing		
Conservative hold		Swing		

=== Lavender Fields ===
Lavender Fields
Party	Candidate	Votes	%	±%
Labour Co-op	Mark Allison*	1,711	72.5	+4.6
Labour Co-op	Edith Macauley*	1,664	70.5	+7.1
Labour Co-op	Billy Christie	1,637	69.4	+3.5
Conservative	Alice Hammond	308	13.1	−0.8
Conservative	Jay Crush	295	12.5	+0.9
Green	Stephen McKeever	287	12.2	N/A
Conservative	David Sawer	257	12.8	+2.2
Liberal Democrats	Liz Barker	206	10.9	+1.5
Liberal Democrats	Mary-Jane Jeanes (Note: Jeanes had previously served as a Liberal Democrat councillor for the ward of West Barnes between 2010 and 2018.)	165	7.0	N/A
Liberal Democrats	Christopher Oxford	127	5.4	N/A
Turnout		2,365	30	
Labour hold		Swing		
Labour hold		Swing		
Labour hold		Swing		

=== Longthornton ===
Longthornton
Party	Candidate	Votes	%	±%
Labour	Brenda Fraser*	2,048	77.1	+4.7
Labour	David Chung*	1,981	74.6	+2.3
Labour	Marsie Skeete*	1,914	72.1	+7.5
Conservative	Peter Borthwick	447	16.8	−5.0
Conservative	Sarah McAlister	441	14.8	−5.1
Conservative	John Telford	393	12.1	−6.1
Liberal Democrats	Hamish Norbrook	129	4.9	−1.9
Liberal Democrats	Kaweh Beheshtizadeh	126	4.7	N/A
Liberal Democrats	Benedict Fletcher	111	4.2	N/A
Turnout		2,668	33	
Labour hold		Swing		
Labour hold		Swing		
Labour hold		Swing		

=== Lower Morden ===
Lower Morden
Party	Candidate	Votes	%	±%
Labour	Sally Kenny*	1,634	51.3	+0.4
Labour	Stan Anderson*	1,632	51.3	+1.4
Labour	Mary Curtin*	1,588	49.9	+2.9
Conservative	Maurice Groves	1,294	40.7	+7.1
Conservative	Geraldine Kirby	1,248	39.2	+9.6
Conservative	Hamna Qureshi	1,098	34.5	+7.7
Green	Alban Thurston	191	6.0	N/A
Liberal Democrats	Asif Ashraf	188	5.9	+0.9
Liberal Democrats	Anne Blanchard	169	5.3	N/A
Liberal Democrats	Gabriel Luck	141	4.4	N/A
Turnout		3,186	45	
Labour hold		Swing		
Labour hold		Swing		
Labour hold		Swing		

=== Merton Park ===
Merton Park
Party	Candidate	Votes	%	±%
Merton Park RA	Peter Southgate*	2,034	57.6	−4.0
Merton Park RA	Edward Foley*	1,981	56.1	−5.3
Merton Park RA	Dickie Wilkinson	1,883	53.3	−10.4
Labour	Mervin Eubanks	644	18.2	+1.6
Labour	Liz Sherwood	622	17.6	+2.7
Labour	Michael Mannion	613	17.3	+2.4
Conservative	Andrew Cunningham	574	16.2	−0.8
Conservative	Alastair Gunn	547	15.5	−0.1
Conservative	Asher Ross	511	14.5	−1.0
Green	Rachel Brooks	360	10.2	N/A
Liberal Democrats	John Braithwaite	269	7.6	+3.3
Liberal Democrats	Stephen Harbron	186	5.3	+1.0
Liberal Democrats	Philip Ling	172	4.9	+1.4
Turnout		3,543	50	
Merton Park RA hold		Swing		
Merton Park RA hold		Swing		
Merton Park RA hold		Swing		

=== Pollards Hill ===
Pollards Hill
Party	Candidate	Votes	%	±%
Labour	Joan Henry*	2,214	80.6	+8.1
Labour	Aidan Mundy	2,140	77.9	+7.0
Labour	Martin Whelton*	2,119	77.2	+6.7
Conservative	Beth Mitchell	382	13.9	+0.7
Conservative	Rachel Prior	346	12.6	±0.0
Conservative	Michael Ormrod	344	12.5	+2.9
Liberal Democrats	Emma Maddison	122	4.4	−1.0
Liberal Democrats	Duncan Burch	118	4.3	N/A
Liberal Democrats	Tony Reiss	76	2.8	N/A
Turnout		2,761	34	
Labour hold		Swing		
Labour hold		Swing		
Labour hold		Swing		

=== Ravensbury ===
Ravensbury
Party	Candidate	Votes	%	±%
Labour	Stephen Alambritis*	1,892	67.7	+1.7
Labour	Natasha Irons	1,793	64.2	+4.9
Labour	Peter McCabe*	1,742	62.4	+7.7
Conservative	Anton Gjeta	354	12.7	+1.5
Conservative	Henry Nelless	353	12.6	−1.5
Conservative	Daniel Page	328	11.7	+0.8
Independent	Mark Gale	303	10.8	N/A
Independent	Christopher Holt	279	10.0	N/A
Independent	Tracy Wilson	254	9.1	N/A
Green	Thomas Killick	187	6.7	−4.3
Liberal Democrats	Somayeh Aghnia	148	5.3	−1.6
UKIP	Terry Sullivan	143	5.1	−16.6
Liberal Democrats	Amanda Harvey	137	4.9	N/A
Liberal Democrats	Richard Shillito	107	3.8	N/A
Turnout		2,797	37	
Labour hold		Swing		
Labour hold		Swing		
Labour hold		Swing		

=== Raynes Park ===
Raynes Park
Party	Candidate	Votes	%	±%
Conservative	Stephen Crowe*	1,486	48.5	+2.2
Conservative	Adam Bush*	1,470	47.9	+1.5
Conservative	Omar Bush	1,351	44.0	−2.6
Labour	Clare Gardner	897	29.2	+2.6
Labour	Clare Antenen	799	26.1	+2.6
Labour	Peter McGinity	695	22.7	+0.6
Liberal Democrats	Martin Lewis	583	19.0	+1.0
Liberal Democrats	David Tourle	553	18.0	+2.5
Liberal Democrats	Vivian Vella	542	17.7	+3.1
Green	Sonja Timpson	475	15.5	N/A
Turnout		3,074	42	
Conservative hold		Swing		
Conservative hold		Swing		
Conservative hold		Swing		

=== St Helier ===
St Helier
Party	Candidate	Votes	%	±%
Labour	Kelly Braund*	1,809	68.9	+1.9
Labour	Dennis Pearce*	1,724	65.7	+1.8
Labour	Nicholas Draper	1,671	63.6	+7.8
Conservative	Sandy Gretton	479	18.2	+1.4
Conservative	Raymond Hutchings	456	17.4	+2.9
Conservative	Nick Kwilecki	414	15.8	+1.8
Green	Philippa Maslin	245	9.3	N/A
Liberal Democrats	Matthew Lowing	194	7.4	N/A
Liberal Democrats	Nicholas Harris	178	6.8	N/A
UKIP	Bob Grahame	145	5.5	−16.6
Liberal Democrats	Simon Parritt	107	4.1	−2.7
Turnout		2,632	33	
Labour hold		Swing		
Labour hold		Swing		
Labour hold		Swing		

=== Trinity ===
Trinity
Party	Candidate	Votes	%	±%
Liberal Democrats	Paul Kohler	1,279	35.8	+23.1
Conservative	James Holmes*	1,199	33.6	−11.1
Conservative	Hayley Ormrod	1,196	33.5	−10.6
Liberal Democrats	Tamara Kohler	1,156	32.4	+22.3
Liberal Democrats	Drake Hackforth-Jones	1,117	31.3	+21.5
Conservative	Abdul Latif*	1,116	31.2	−7.7
Labour	Becky Hooper	1,023	28.6	−4.1
Labour	Ryan Barnett	935	26.2	−2.1
Labour	Billy Hayes	852	23.9	−2.6
Green	Elizabeth Matthews	358	10.0	−8.9
Duma Polska	Marcia Moraczewski	33	0.9	N/A
UKIP	Rod Scott	30	0.8	−8.3
Turnout		3,579	48	
Liberal Democrats gain from Conservative		Swing		
Conservative hold		Swing		
Conservative hold		Swing		

=== Village ===
Village
Party	Candidate	Votes	%	±%
Conservative	Thomasa Barlow	2,206	75.2	+2.4
Conservative	Andrew Howard	2,160	73.7	+1.3
Conservative	Amer Latif*	2,094	71.4	+6.3
Liberal Democrats	Susan Bucknall	407	13.9	+6.1
Liberal Democrats	Dan Bradman	404	13.8	+6.3
Liberal Democrats	Hugo Forshaw	341	11.6	+5.8
Green	Lisa Wood	292	10.0	+0.6
Labour	Maria Bentley-Dingwall	287	9.8	−3.8
Labour	Teresa Ocansey	221	7.5	−3.1
Labour	Charles Ocansey	203	6.9	−2.0
Turnout		2,934	47	
Conservative hold		Swing		
Conservative hold		Swing		
Conservative hold		Swing		

=== West Barnes ===
On 12 June 2020, Quilliam left the Liberal Democrats and joined the Labour Party.

West Barnes
Party	Candidate	Votes	%	±%
Liberal Democrats	Eloise Bailey	1,624	40.2	+2.5
Liberal Democrats	Hina Bokhari	1,534	38.0	+3.0
Liberal Democrats	Carl Quilliam	1,454	36.0	+10.1
Conservative	Gilli Lewis-Lavender*	1,419	35.1	−5.8
Conservative	Brian Lewis-Lavender*	1,380	34.1	−1.9
Conservative	Logie Lohendran	1,292	32.0	+4.2
Labour	Caroline Charles	976	24.1	+7.4
Labour	Rebecca Moses	935	23.1	+6.5
Labour	Abdul Atcha	880	21.8	+6.9
Green	Conal Cunningham	304	7.5	−5.6
Turnout		4,054	54	
Liberal Democrats gain from Conservative		Swing		
Liberal Democrats hold		Swing		
Liberal Democrats gain from Conservative		Swing		

=== Wimbledon Park ===
Wimbledon Park
Party	Candidate	Votes	%	±%
Conservative	Oonagh Moulton*	1,822	50.8	+6.5
Conservative	Janice Howard*	1,792	50.0	+3.4
Conservative	Ed Gretton	1,748	48.7	+6.1
Labour	Hugh Constant	1,021	28.5	+0.4
Labour	Pam Treanor	996	27.8	+4.5
Labour	Terry Daniels	886	24.7	+1.5
Green	Juliet Boyd	603	16.8	+0.5
Liberal Democrats	Robin Goodchild	536	14.9	+3.4
Liberal Democrats	Victoria Watt	525	14.6	+3.7
Liberal Democrats	JB Tanqueray	509	14.2	+4.9
Turnout		3,592	43	
Conservative hold		Swing		
Conservative hold		Swing		
Conservative hold		Swing		

== By-elections ==
Cannon Hill by-election, 20 June 2019
Party	Candidate	Votes	%	±%
Liberal Democrats	Jenifer Gould	1,060	35.0	+23.7
Labour	Ryan Barnett	876	28.9	−16.0
Conservative	Michael Paterson	867	28.6	−14.3
Green	Susie O'Connor	158	5.2	New
UKIP	Andrew Mills	68	2.2	−1.7
Majority		184	6.1	N/A
Turnout		2,030	41.8	−8.2
Liberal Democrats gain from Labour		Swing		

The by-election was triggered by the resignation of Cllr Mark Kenny of the Labour Party.

St Helier by-election, 6 May 2021
Party	Candidate	Votes	%	±%
Labour	Helena Dollimore	1,859	54.4	−14.5
Conservative	Isaac Frimpong	907	26.6	+8.4
Green	Pippa Maslin	409	12.0	+2.7
Liberal Democrats	Simon Jones	241	7.1	−0.3
Majority		952	27.8	−22.9
Turnout		3,495	42.4	+9.4
Labour hold		Swing		

The by-election was triggered by the resignation of Cllr Kelly Braund of the Labour Party.

== Notes and references ==
Notes
