= 1978 Merton London Borough Council election =

1978 local election in England

- 4 May 1978

All 57 council seats on Merton London Borough Council
- Turnout: 46.4%

	First party	Second party	Third party
Party	Conservative	Labour	Longthornton and Tamworth Residents
Last election	33 seats (Note: In the 1974 election, 4 Conservative aldermen and 29 Conservative councillors were elected, giving the Conservative Party a total of 33 seats.)	27 seats (Note: In the 1974 election, 5 Labour aldermen and 22 Labour councillors were elected, giving the Labour Party a total of 27 seats.)	3 seats
Seats won	39	15	3
Seat change	▲6	▼12	0
Popular vote	85,773	56,501	5,336
Percentage	52.6%	34.7%	3.9%
Council leader before election
Allan Jones
Conservative
Council leader after election
Allan Jones
Conservative

Elections for the London Borough of Merton were held on 4 May 1978 to elect members of Merton London Borough Council in London, England. This was on the same day as other local elections in England and Scotland.

The whole council was up for election and the incumbent majority Conservative administration maintained its overall control of the council. This was the first election held in which no aldermen were elected onto the council. Boundary changes also meant that the number of elected seats increased by 3.

== Background ==
At the last election, the Conservatives had won a majority of three seats on the council, with twenty-nine elected members and four aldermen. They subsequently gained a seat from the Labour Party in a by-election in the ward of Wimbledon South on 19 September 1974 and then lost a seat to the Liberal Party in the ward of Cannon Hill on 30 October 1975.

Prior to the election, elected councillors appointed nine aldermen to serve on Merton London Borough Council. This was the first election in which this arrangement ended, as was required by the Local Government Act 1972, which rendered the post merely an honorary title.

The Conservatives did not stand in the newly created ward of Longthornton, leaving the three-member ward as a two-way contest between the Labour Party and the Longthornton and Tamworth Residents Association.

== Results ==
The Conservatives maintained their overall majority control of the council, increasing their majority to 21 seats.

Merton local election result 1978 (Note: The Independent vote count includes one candidate who stood under the description of "Theatrical Agent" in Village, winning 169 votes.)
Party	Seats	Gains	Losses	Net gain/loss	Seats %	Votes %	Votes	+/−
Conservative	39	n/a	n/a	▲6	68.4	52.6	85,773	
Labour	15	n/a	n/a	▼12	26.3	34.7	56,501	
Longthornton and Tamworth Residents	3	n/a	n/a	0	5.3	3.9	6,336	
Liberal	0	n/a	n/a	0	0.0	8.3	13,532	
National Front	0	n/a	n/a	0	0.0	0.3	457	
Independent	0	n/a	n/a	0	0.0	0.2	272	
Workers Revolutionary	0	n/a	n/a	0	0.0	0.0	74	

== Notes and references ==
Notes
