= 1986 Merton London Borough Council election =

1986 local election in England

- 8 May 1986

All 57 council seats on Merton London Borough Council
- Turnout: 49.8% (▲2.3%)

	First party	Second party	Third party
Party	Conservative	Labour	Longthornton and Tamworth Residents
Last election	44 seats, 51.2%	13 seats, 25.4%	0 seats, 1.5%
Seats won	29	25	3
Seat change	▼15	▲12	▲3
Popular vote	69,161	59,974	3,919
Percentage	41.1%	35.7%	2.3%
Swing	▼10.1%	▲10.3%	▲0.8%
Council leader before election
Harry Cowd
Conservative
Council leader after election
Harry Cowd
Conservative

Elections for the London Borough of Merton were held on 8 May 1986 to elect members of Merton London Borough Council in London, England. This was on the same day as other local elections in England and Scotland.

The whole council was up for election and the incumbent majority Conservative administration remained in overall control of the council, its majority reduced to one seat.

== Background ==
At the last election, the Conservatives had remained in overall majority control of the council, winning 44 seats. The Labour Party was returned as the only opposition party, with 13 seats. In the same election, Longthornton and Tamworth Residents Association lost all their three seats to the Conservatives.

Following the death of Cllr. Michael Page, at a by-election in Longthornton on 15 March 1984, the Longthornton and Tamworth Residents Association regained one of their seats from the Conservatives.

== Results ==
Merton local election result 1986 (Note: The Liberal Democrat vote count includes two candidates who stood under the description of "Liberal Alliance Focus Team" in Durnsford.) (Note: The Independent vote count includes one candidate who stood under the description of "Independent Labour" in Longthornton, winning 146 votes.)
Party	Seats	Gains	Losses	Net gain/loss	Seats %	Votes %	Votes	+/−
Conservative	29	0	15	▼15	50.9%	41.1%	69,161	▼10.1%
Labour	25	12	0	▲12	43.9%	35.7%	59,974	▲10.3%
Longthornton and Tamworth Residents	3	3	0	▲3	5.3%	2.3%	3,919	▲0.8%
Alliance	0	0	0	0	0%	20.4%	34,325	▼1.1%
Independent	0	0	0	0	0%	0.4%	630	n/a
National Front	0	0	0	0	0	0.1%	154	Steady

In Durnsford, future Prime Minister Theresa May was first elected to public office, holding the seat for the Conservative Party and beating Tony Colman, the future Labour MP for Putney, who also later led Merton Council between 1991 and 1997.

== Ward results ==
=== Durnsford ===
Durnsford (2)
Party	Candidate	Votes	%	±%
Conservative	Geoffrey Gill	857	36.7%	
Conservative	Theresa May	818		
Labour	Arthur Kennedy	734	32.1%	
Liberal	Susan Knibbs	731	31.2%	
Labour	Anthony J. Colman	730		
Liberal	Richard Barraclough	692		
Turnout		4,562		
Conservative hold		Swing		
Conservative hold		Swing		

== Notes and references ==
Notes
