= Tony Colman (politician) =

British politician and businessman

Member of Parliament for Putney
- In office 1 May 1997 – 11 April 2005
- Preceded by: David Mellor
- Succeeded by: Justine Greening

Leader of Merton London Borough Council
- In office 1991–1997
- Preceded by: Geoffrey Smith
- Succeeded by: Mike Brunt

Personal details
- Born: Anthony John Colman; 24 July 1943 (age 83) Sheringham, Norfolk, England
- Party: Labour
- Education: Magdalene College, Cambridge (MA); University of East Anglia (PhD)
- Occupation: Politician, businessman, academic

Academic background
- Thesis: The Political Economy and Coalitions in Botswana’s Water Sector Reform 2009-13: to what extent can the process of reform be understood? (2013)

Academic work
- Discipline: International development
- Sub-discipline: Water management; Resource innovation
- Institutions: University of Cape Town; Columbia University; University of East Anglia; University of Cambridge; Stellenbosch University

Anthony John Colman (born 24 July 1943) is a British politician, businessman, and academic, who served as the Labour Member of Parliament for Putney from 1997 to 2005. Prior to entering Parliament, he was the Leader of Merton London Borough Council from 1991 to 1997. Colman has since become an academic in water management and resource innovation.

== Early life and career ==
Colman was born in Sheringham, Norfolk, on 24 July 1943 and educated at Paston Grammar School in North Walsham, Norfolk. Colman studied at Magdalene College, Cambridge, where he completed his Master's degree in the Historical Tripos.

Colman worked for the United Africa Company, a now-defunct subsidiary of Unilever, from 1964 to 1969. From 1966 to 1967, he worked as a postgraduate researcher at the London School of Economics.

Colman was appointed as a board director at the Burton Group in 1969, a position which he held until 1990. During his time at the Burton Group, he helped to found Topshop.

Colman was the Labour candidate for South West Hertfordshire in the 1979 general election, but lost to the incumbent Conservative MP, Geoffrey Dodsworth.

In the 1986 Merton council elections, Colman stood as one of two Labour candidates for Durnsford in the London Borough of Merton, but the ward's two seats were held by the Conservatives, including the newly elected Theresa May, who would later become Prime Minister.

In 1990, he was elected as a councillor for the Lavender ward in Merton, before becoming leader of the council from 1991 to 1997.

Prior to becoming an MP, Colman chaired the Low Pay Unit, a charity advising low-paid workers. He served as the Director of the Polka Children's Theatre from 1995 until 2004.

== Parliamentary career ==
Colman stood in Putney in the 1997 general election; he won with 45.6% of the vote and a majority of 2,976 votes, defeating the incumbent Conservative MP David Mellor and James Goldsmith, the leader of the Eurosceptic Referendum Party. Colman's majority was reduced to 2,771 votes in the 2001 general election, and he lost his seat by 1,766 votes to Justine Greening, the Conservative candidate, in the 2005 general election.

Colman chaired the All Party Parliamentary Group on Retail, the All Party Parliamentary Group on Socially Responsible Investment, the All Party Parliamentary Group on the United Nations, and the All Party Parliamentary Group on Management.

During his time in parliament, Colman was also vice-chair of GLOBE UK, a pressure group promoting sustainable development. He chaired the Public Private Partnership Programme Ltd until October 1998, and remained on its board during his later parliamentary career.

== Later career ==
Since 2005, Colman has been a Non-Executive Director of Africapractice, a corporate citizenship and communications consultancy.

Colman is a member of the World Future Council, of which he was a founding member in 2006, becoming a councillor in 2007. Since 2013, Colman has been the permanent representative of the WFC at the United Nations' New York headquarters.

From July 2008 to November 2010, Colman was the Director of One World Trust, a pressure group for global governance of which he is now the chair of the board of trustees.

Colman completed his doctoral thesis at the University of East Anglia in 2013; it specialised in water resource management and water supply and sanitation in Botswana. He has since published extensively on the subject of water management, with particular focus on southern Africa.

Colman is a research fellow at the University of Cape Town, the Earth Institute at Columbia University and his alma mater, the University of East Anglia. From June 2020, he has been a Visiting Research Scholar at the Centre for Natural Material Innovation, Department of Architecture, Cambridge University. His research covers the need to move to nature-based materials, such as mass-timber/bamboo and he is engaging with the UNFCCC for COP26, 27 and 28. He is a research associate at Stellenbosch University, Department of Forestry and Biological Sciences.

Colman was also a Trustee of Chatham House and the New Economics Foundation and is on the Council of the Overseas Development Institute 2005–12.

Parliament of the United Kingdom
| Preceded by David Mellor | Member of Parliament for Putney; 1997–2005 | Succeeded by Justine Greening |
