= 1982 Merton London Borough Council election =

1982 local election in England

- 6 May 1982

All 57 council seats on Merton London Borough Council
- Turnout: 47.5% (▲1.1%)
	First party	Second party
Party	Conservative	Labour
Last election	39 seats, 52.6%	15 seats, 26.3%
Seats won	44	13
Seat change	▲5	▼2
Popular vote	82,245	40,810
Percentage	51.2%	25.4%
Swing	▼1.4%	▼9.3%
Council leader before election
Harry Cowd
Conservative
Council leader after election
Harry Cowd
Conservative

Elections for the London Borough of Merton were held on 6 May 1982 to elect members of Merton London Borough Council in London, England. This was on the same day as other local elections in England and Scotland.

The whole council was up for election and the incumbent majority Conservative administration maintained its overall control of the council.

== Background ==
At the last election, the Conservatives had won a majority of ten seats on the council. The Labour Party, who had won 15 seats at that election, subsequently lost a seat in a by-election in Ravensbury on 22 October 1981 to the newly formed SDP-Liberal Alliance.

== Results ==
The Conservatives maintained their overall majority of the council, gaining four seats from Labour and three from Longthornton and Tamworth Residents Association; the latter lost all of its three seats in Longthornton. At the last election, the Conservatives did not contest the ward of Longthornton.

The Conservatives gained three seats from Labour in Abbey and one seat from Labour in St Helier. However, the Conservatives lost two seats to Labour, one in Phipps Bridge and the other in Graveney.

The SDP-Liberal Alliance failed to hold onto the seat it had won in the by-election in Ravensbury, where it polled behind Labour and the Conservatives. Nevertheless, the Alliance won 21.5% of the vote share and was within 6,000 votes of the Labour Party; this was a significant improvement on the local electoral record of its predecessor, the Liberal Party, which had won 8.3% of the vote share in the 1978 election. In the face of the Alliance's surge, all recontesting parties lost vote share. By seat share, this was the worst result for Labour in Merton since 1968.

Merton local election result 1982
Party	Seats	Gains	Losses	Net gain/loss	Seats %	Votes %	Votes	+/−
Conservative	44	7	2	▲5	77.2%	51.2%	82,245	▼1.4%
Labour	13	2	4	▼2	22.8%	25.4%	40,810	▼9.3%
Alliance	0	0	0	0	0%	21.5%	34,513	n/a
Longthornton and Tamworth Residents	0	0	3	▼3	0%	1.5%	2,438	▼2.4%
Ecology	0	0	0	0	0%	0.2%	370	n/a
National Front	0	0	0	0	0%	0.1%	151	▼0.2%
Independent	0	0	0	0	0%	0.0%	67	n/a
