= Figges Marsh =

Park in the United Kingdom

Coordinates: 51.414°N 0.160°W

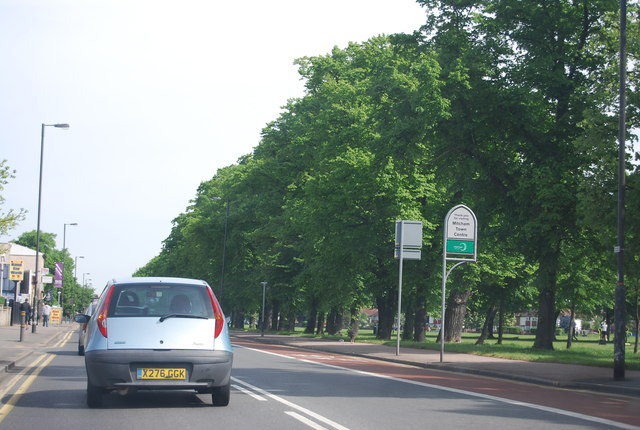
The A217, London Road, passing Figge's Marsh

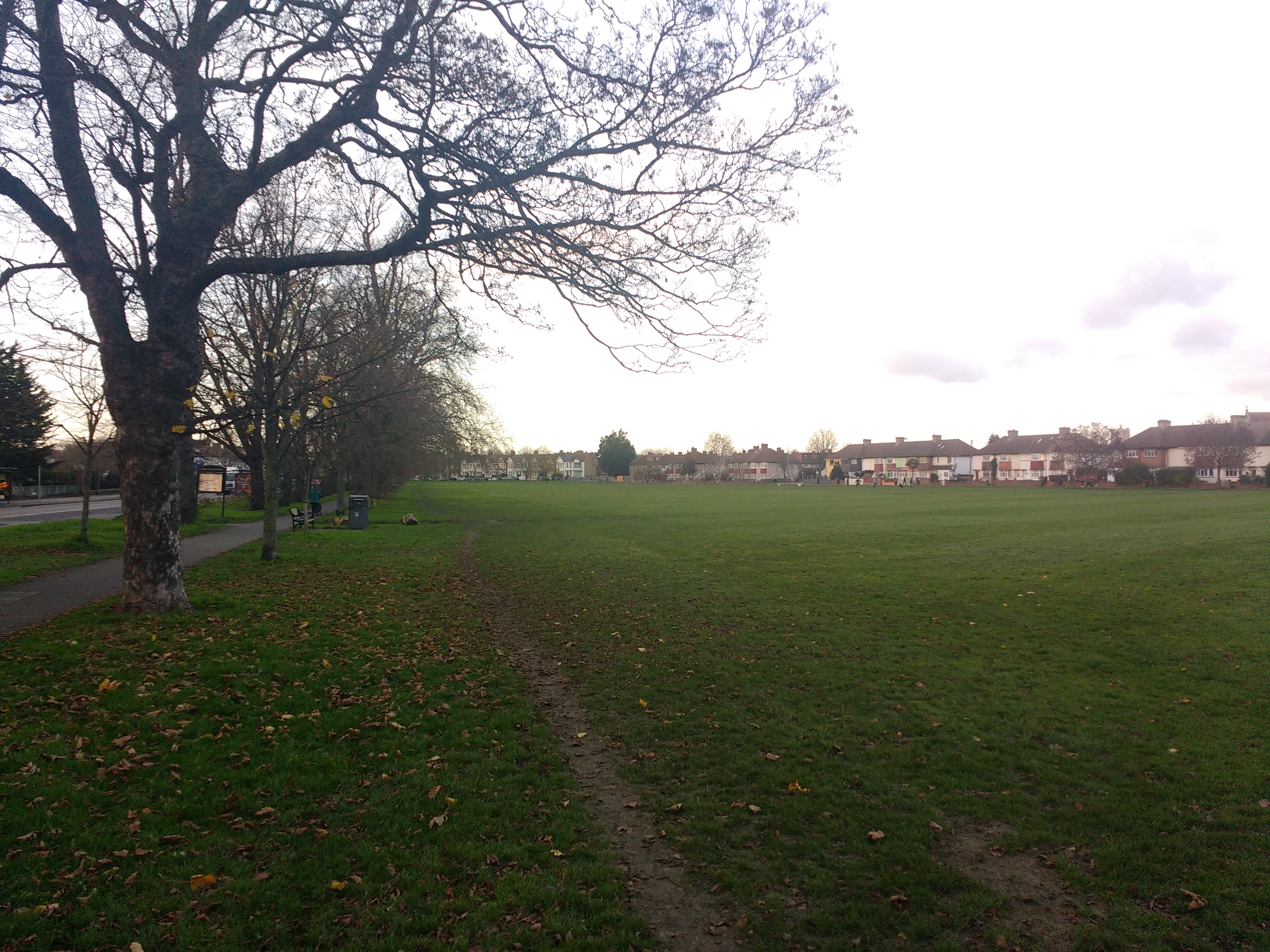
Figge's Marsh, looking north

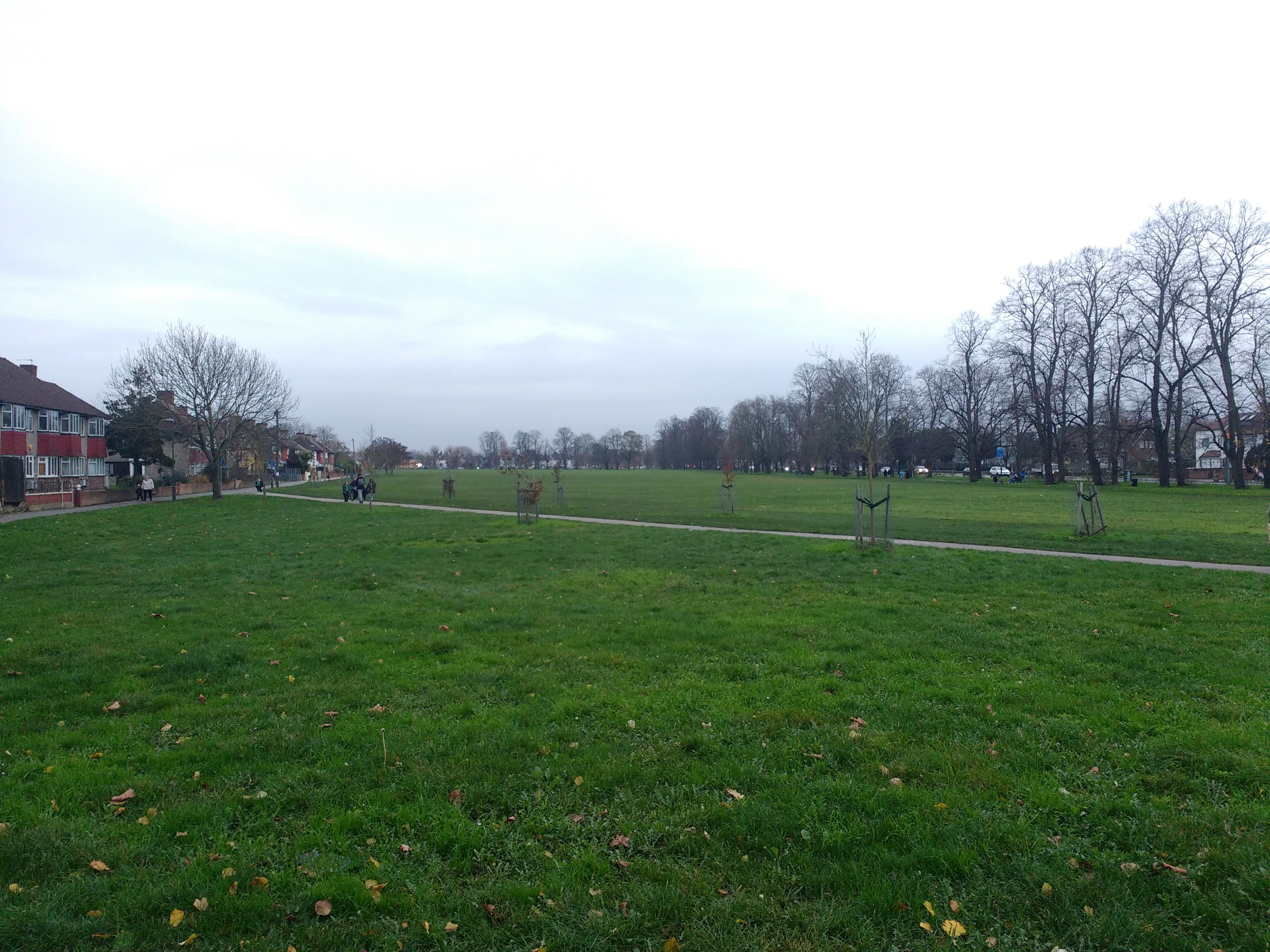
Figge's Marsh, looking south

Figge's Marsh is a 25-acre public park in the London Borough of Merton. It is in Mitcham, close to Tooting railway station.

Originally, the park was next to a toll road into London, which was turnpiked in 1745; now known as London Road.

== The Name ==
The park was named after William Figge who occupied the land from 1357. In maps of 1750, it is referenced as Piggs Marsh; in 1800, as Pigs Marsh Common [see External Source, The Underground Map, for map extracts].

Signage, erected in 2012, at the southern end, recognises that Figge's Marsh is protected in perpetuity as a Fields in Trust Queen Elizabeth II Field. This was in celebration of HM Queen Elizabeth II's Diamond Jubilee & the 2012 London Olympics. The parks that participated in the scheme received a commemorative plaque, an oak sapling &, potentially, access to an improvement grant.

== Surrounding Area ==
At the eastern boundary of Figge's Marsh, during the medieval period, was the Biggin Farm estate.

Industry developed at the southern end of the park from 1800. The Pascall's confectionery factory was located here in 1888, built on land purchased from James Bridger's Manor Farm, taking advantage of the locally grown peppermint oil.

However, the area to the east and west remained agricultural and open; Swain's & Tamworth farm, at the western boundary of Figge's Marsh, are made reference to in the 1900 map [The Underground Map, as below]. That is, until the development of housing in the Victorian & Edwardian period.

== External Sources ==
- The Underground Map.com – historical map of Figge's Marsh from 1900
- Wikipedia, Toll Roads in Great Britain - summary of toll roads/turnpikes, in Great Britain
- Figge's Marsh photograph from 1950s

== Photo gallery ==
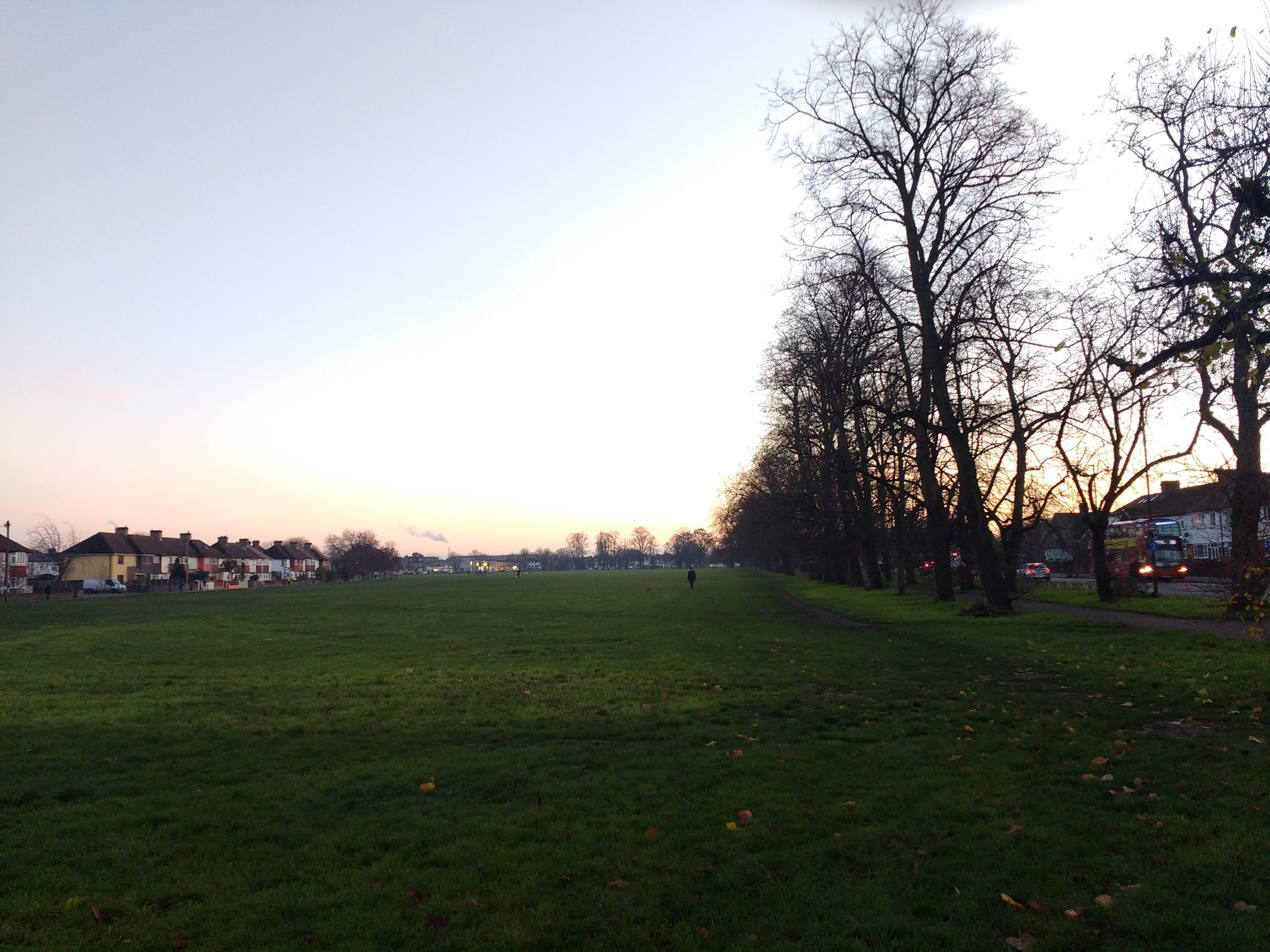
Figge's Marsh, looking south, alongside London Road (at sunset, Dec 2020)

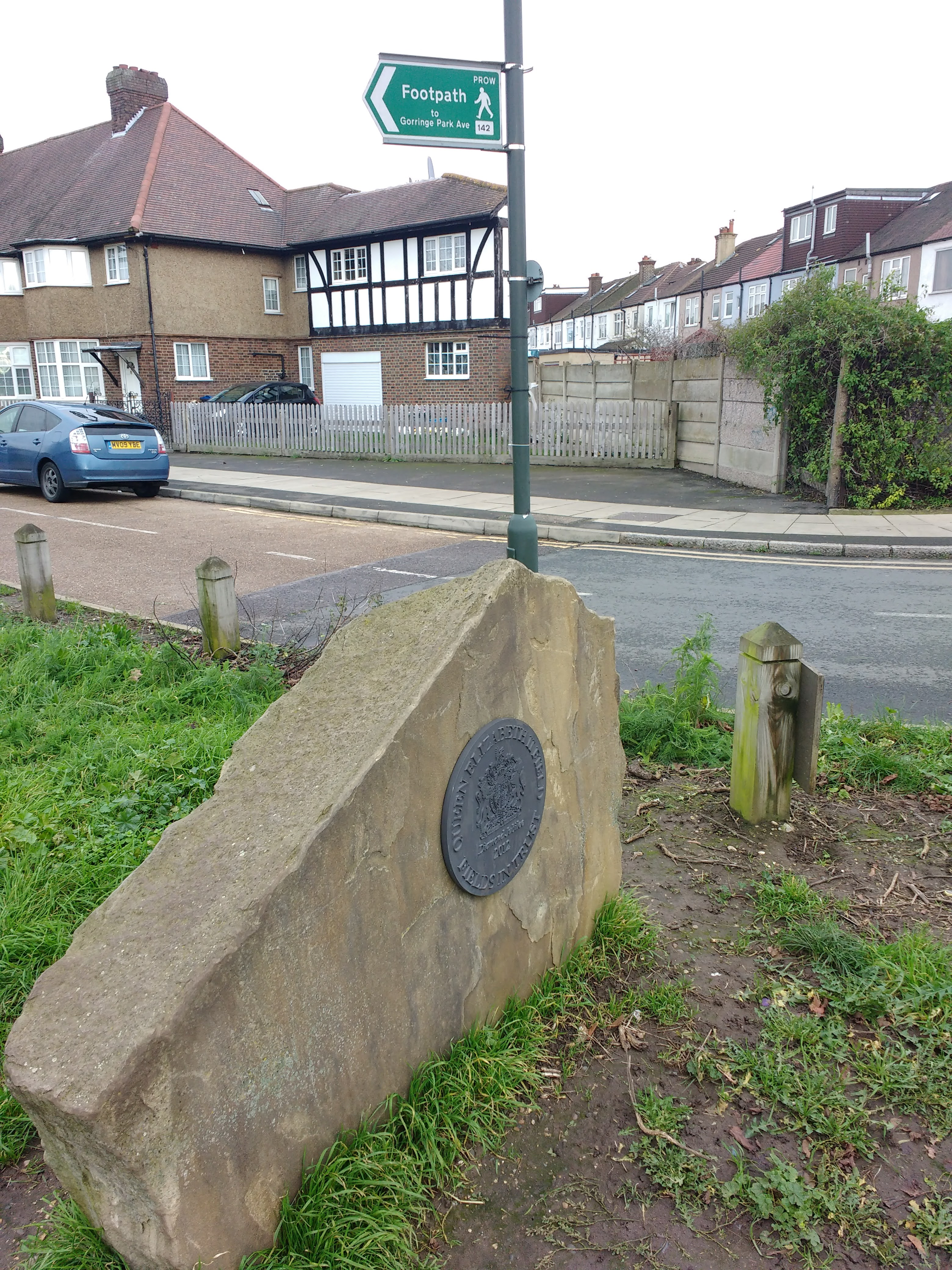
Name plate erected at southern end of Figge's Marsh in 2012

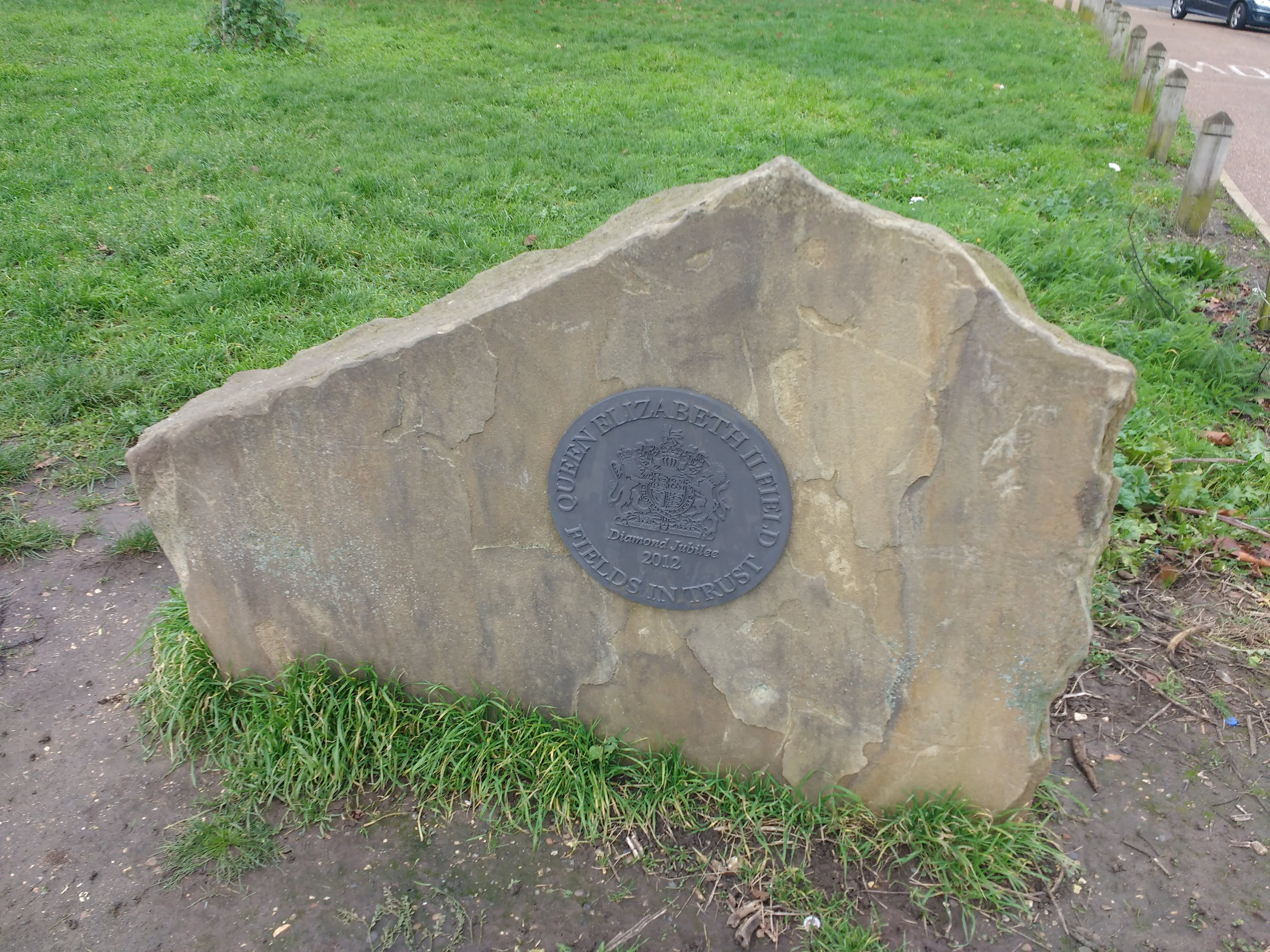
Name plate erected at southern end of Figge's Marsh in 2012

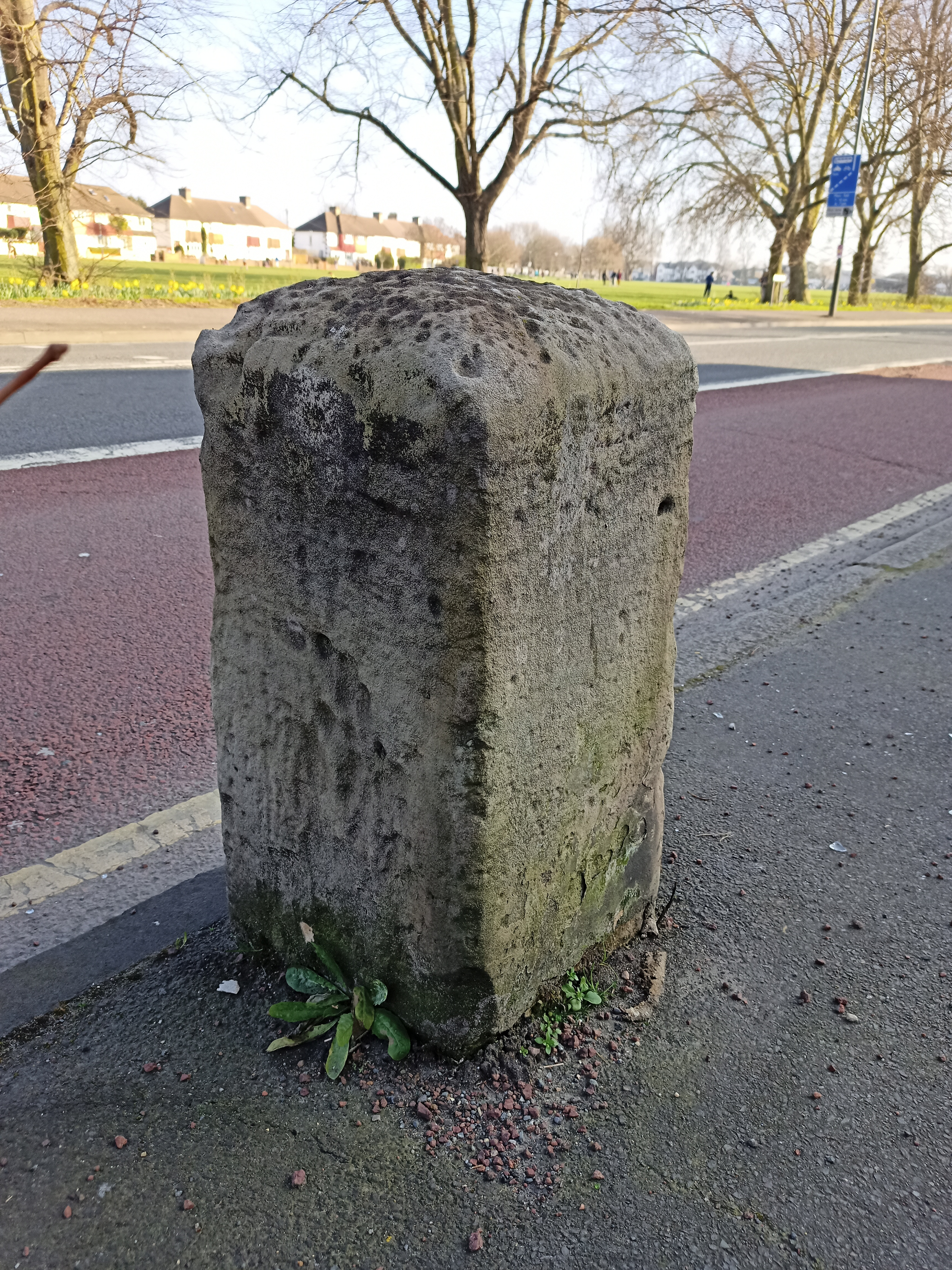
London Road milestone opposite Figge's Marsh, looking south east

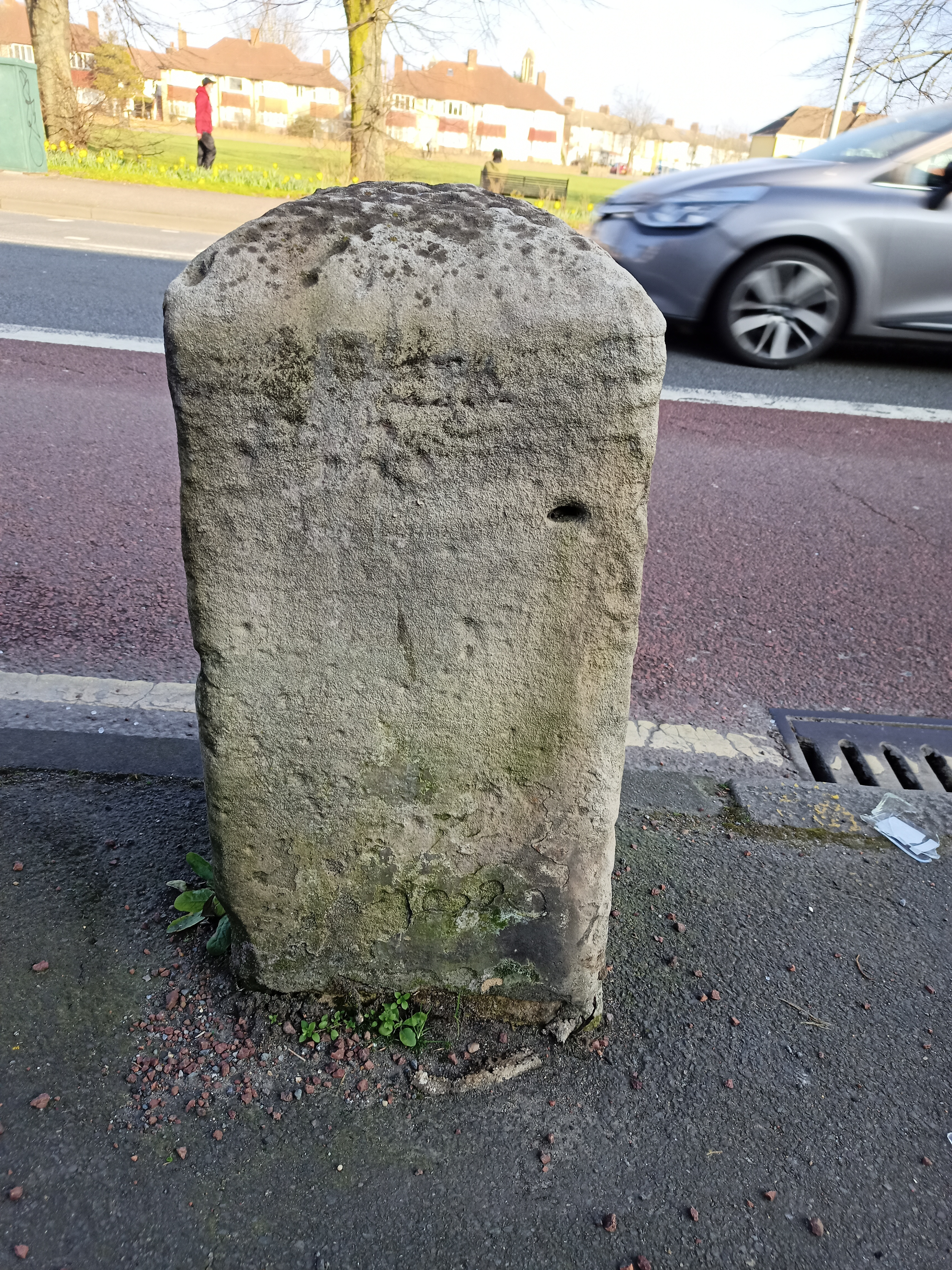
London Road milestone opposite Figge's Marsh, looking east

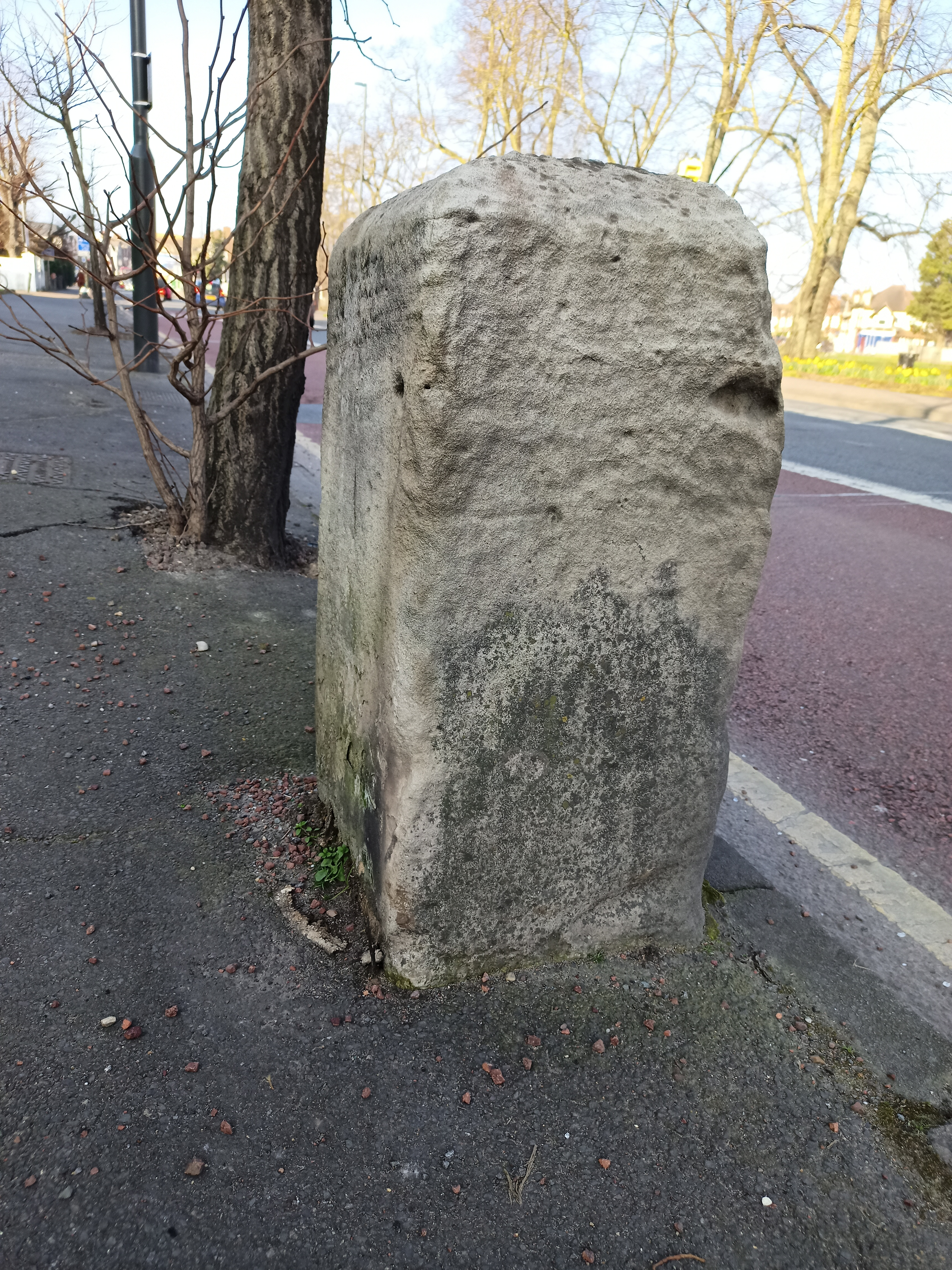
London Road milestone opposite Figge's Marsh, looking north

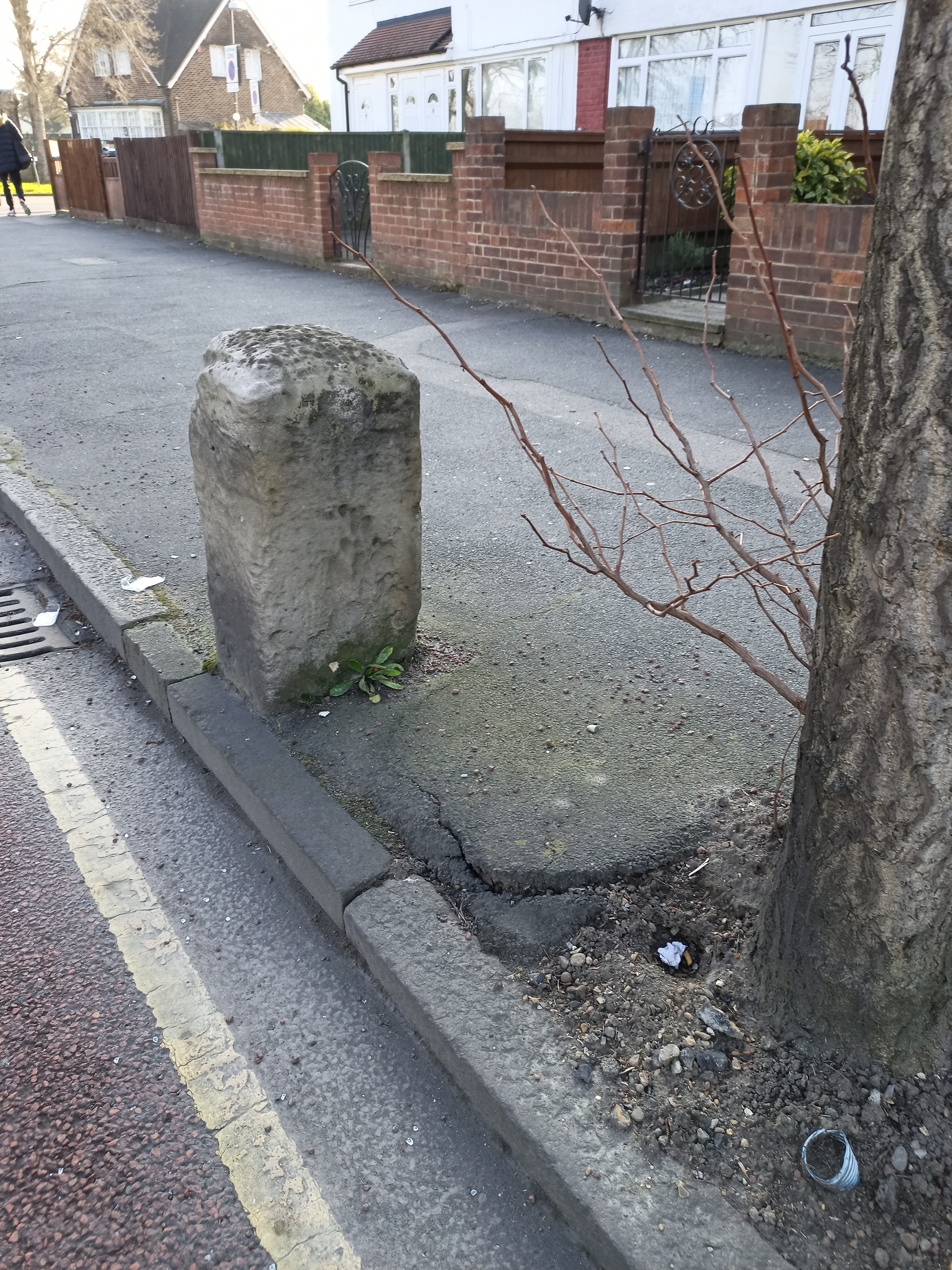
London Road milestone opposite Figge's Marsh, looking south west
