= 1964 Merton London Borough Council election =

The 1964 Merton Council election took place on 7 May 1964 to elect members of Merton London Borough Council in London, England. The whole council was up for election and the council went into no overall control.

== Background ==
These elections were the first to the newly formed borough. Previously elections had taken place in the Municipal Borough of Mitcham, Municipal Borough of Wimbledon and Merton and Morden Urban District. These boroughs and districts were joined to form the new London Borough of Merton by the London Government Act 1963.

A total of 146 candidates stood in the election for the 54 seats being contested across 14 wards. These included a full slate from the Labour party, while the Conservative and Liberal parties stood 47 and 28 respectively. Other candidates included 8 Residents, 6 Communists and 3 Independents. There were 13 four-seat wards and 1 two-seat ward.

This election had aldermen as well as directly elected councillors. The Conservatives got 5 aldermen, Labour 3, and Independents 1.

The Council was elected in 1964 as a "shadow authority" but did not start operations until 1 April 1965.

== Election result ==
The results saw no party gain overall control of the new council with Labour winning 26 and the Conservatives winning 25 of the 54 seats. Overall turnout in the election was 45.3%. This turnout included 913 postal votes.

== Ward results ==
Cannon Hill (4)
| Party | Candidate | Votes | % | ±% |
|---|---|---|---|---|
| Turnout | | 4,785 | 47.5 | |
| | Conservative win (new seat) | | | |
| | Conservative win (new seat) | | | |
| | Conservative win (new seat) | | | |
| | Conservative win (new seat) | | | |

Mitcham Central (4)
| Party | Candidate | Votes | % | ±% |
|---|---|---|---|---|
| Turnout | | 4,204 | 48.4 | |
| | Residents win (new seat) | | | |
| | Residents win (new seat) | | | |
| | Residents win (new seat) | | | |
| | Residents win (new seat) | | | |

Mitcham East (2)
| Party | Candidate | Votes | % | ±% |
|---|---|---|---|---|
| Turnout | | 2,931 | 54.8 | |
| | Labour win (new seat) | | | |
| | Labour win (new seat) | | | |

Mitcham North (4)
| Party | Candidate | Votes | % | ±% |
|---|---|---|---|---|
| Turnout | | 5,274 | 48.6 | |
| | Labour win (new seat) | | | |
| | Labour win (new seat) | | | |
| | Labour win (new seat) | | | |
| | Labour win (new seat) | | | |

Mitcham South (4)
| Party | Candidate | Votes | % | ±% |
|---|---|---|---|---|
| Turnout | | 3,790 | 38.1 | |
| | Labour win (new seat) | | | |
| | Labour win (new seat) | | | |
| | Labour win (new seat) | | | |
| | Labour win (new seat) | | | |

Mitcham West (4)
| Party | Candidate | Votes | % | ±% |
|---|---|---|---|---|
| Turnout | | 3,349 | 34.7 | |
| | Labour win (new seat) | | | |
| | Labour win (new seat) | | | |
| | Labour win (new seat) | | | |
| | Labour win (new seat) | | | |

Morden (4)
| Party | Candidate | Votes | % | ±% |
|---|---|---|---|---|
| Turnout | | 4,107 | 44.8 | |
| | Conservative win (new seat) | | | |
| | Conservative win (new seat) | | | |
| | Conservative win (new seat) | | | |
| | Conservative win (new seat) | | | |

Priory (4)
| Party | Candidate | Votes | % | ±% |
|---|---|---|---|---|
| Turnout | | 4,151 | 41.1 | |
| | Conservative win (new seat) | | | |
| | Conservative win (new seat) | | | |
| | Conservative win (new seat) | | | |
| | Conservative win (new seat) | | | |

Ravensbury (4)
| Party | Candidate | Votes | % | ±% |
|---|---|---|---|---|
| Turnout | | 4,173 | 39.2 | |
| | Labour win (new seat) | | | |
| | Labour win (new seat) | | | |
| | Labour win (new seat) | | | |
| | Labour win (new seat) | | | |

West Barnes (4)
| Party | Candidate | Votes | % | ±% |
|---|---|---|---|---|
| Turnout | | 5,511 | 58.0 | |
| | Conservative win (new seat) | | | |
| | Conservative win (new seat) | | | |
| | Conservative win (new seat) | | | |
| | Conservative win (new seat) | | | |

Wimbledon East (4)
| Party | Candidate | Votes | % | ±% |
|---|---|---|---|---|
| Turnout | | 4,582 | 45.4 | |
| | Labour win (new seat) | | | |
| | Labour win (new seat) | | | |
| | Labour win (new seat) | | | |
| | Labour win (new seat) | | | |

Wimbledon North (4)
| Party | Candidate | Votes | % | ±% |
|---|---|---|---|---|
| Turnout | | 4,808 | 46.2 | |
| | Conservative win (new seat) | | | |
| | Conservative win (new seat) | | | |
| | Conservative win (new seat) | | | |
| | Conservative win (new seat) | | | |

Wimbledon South (4)
| Party | Candidate | Votes | % | ±% |
|---|---|---|---|---|
| Turnout | | 4,373 | 43.9 | |
| | Labour win (new seat) | | | |
| | Labour win (new seat) | | | |
| | Labour win (new seat) | | | |
| | Labour win (new seat) | | | |

Wimbledon West (4)
| Party | Candidate | Votes | % | ±% |
|---|---|---|---|---|
| Turnout | | 5,183 | 48.1 | |
| | Conservative win (new seat) | | | |
| | Conservative win (new seat) | | | |
| | Conservative win (new seat) | | | |
| | Conservative win (new seat) | | | |
