= 1974 Merton London Borough Council election =

1974 local election in England

The 1974 Merton Council election took place on 2 May 1974 to elect members of Merton London Borough Council in London, England. The whole council was up for election and the Conservative party gained overall control of the council.

== Ward results ==
Cannon Hill (4)
Party	Candidate	Votes	%	±%

Mitcham Central (4)
Party	Candidate	Votes	%	±%

Mitcham East (2)
Party	Candidate	Votes	%	±%

Mitcham North (4)
Party	Candidate	Votes	%	±%

Mitcham South (4)
Party	Candidate	Votes	%	±%

Mitcham West (4)
Party	Candidate	Votes	%	±%

Morden (4)
Party	Candidate	Votes	%	±%

Priory (4)
Party	Candidate	Votes	%	±%

Ravensbury (4)
Party	Candidate	Votes	%	±%

West Barnes (4)
Party	Candidate	Votes	%	±%

Wimbledon East (4)
Party	Candidate	Votes	%	±%

Wimbledon North (4)
Party	Candidate	Votes	%	±%

Wimbledon South (4)
Party	Candidate	Votes	%	±%

Wimbledon West (4)
Party	Candidate	Votes	%	±%
