= Earth Institute Center for Environmental Sustainability =

US research institutes

The Earth Institute Center for Environmental Sustainability (EICES, pronounced /ˈaɪsiːz/), formerly known as the Center for Environmental Research and Conservation (CERC), consists of two institutions located at Columbia University. The first is an Earth Institute which started as the first Earth Institute in 1995. The second is the Secretariat of the Consortium for Environmental Research and Conservation, established in cooperation with The Earth Institute, the American Museum of Natural History, the New York Botanical Garden, the Wildlife Conservation Society and EcoHealth Alliance on biodiversity conservation.

EICES's primary goal is protecting biodiversity and ecosystems. The Earth Institute Center for Environmental Sustainability is "dedicated to the development of a rich, robust and vibrant world within which we can secure a sustainable future."

EICES is headquartered at The Earth Institute, Columbia University. This location facilitates multidisciplinary work within the university and with external collaborators. EICES also provides training and education to the non-science community through the application of understandable, robust conservation science.

== Research ==
EICES facilitates the development of research programs among its consortium members: the American Museum of Natural History (AMNH), Columbia University, the New York Botanical Garden (NYBG), the Wildlife Conservation Society (WCS) and EcoHealth Alliance. Some activities are consortium-wide, representing all the institutions. Others involve only two or three consortium partners. Collectively, the consortium's research is global, with programs in over 60 countries.

Throughout EICES's 18-year history, consortium researchers, volunteers, interns, students, faculty and staff have been involved in:

- Finding new species of plants and animals in biodiversity hotspots
- Mapping the movement of wildlife and zoonotic diseases that pass from animals to humans
- Studying the evolution of primate behavior
- Examining how forests respond to disturbance
- Studying ecosystem processes and services like carbon storage by tropical trees and grasslands
- Understanding how to develop participatory conservation programs
- Working on the restoration of damaged habitats
- Exploring models for sustainable development through a balance of good economics, governance, and conservation

In addition to research activities and projects, EICES' adjunct faculty and research scientists teach science courses in the Department of Ecology, Evolution, and Environmental Biology (E3B), as well as in the EICES's Summer Ecosystem Experience for Undergraduates Program (SEE-U) and Certificate Program in Conservation and Environmental Sustainability. Instructors are faculty and staff at consortium institutions. The consortium often provides research opportunities for Columbia's undergraduate, master's and Ph.D. students, especially those in E3B.

== Education and training ==
The Earth Institute Center for Environemtal Sustainability (EICES) brings together five institutions: Columbia University, The American Museum of Natural History, the New York Botanical Garden, the Wildlife Conservation Society, and the EcoHealth Alliance (formerly known as the Wildlife Trust). Established in 1994, EICES offers educational, programs spanning graduate, undergraduate, and K-12 levels, as well as courses for executives and the public. Its educational framework focuses on incorporating current research into classroom instruction to address environmental and ecological sustainability issues.

== Sources ==
- The Earth Institute
- EICES Research
- EICES Home Page
- EICES Research
