= Cannon Hill, Merton =

Coordinates: 51.400544°N 0.217431°W

Cannon Hill
- Location within Greater London
- Population: 9,249 (2011 Census. Ward)
- London borough: Merton
- Ceremonial county: Greater London
- Region: London
- Country: England
- Sovereign state: United Kingdom
- Post town: LONDON
- Postcode district: SW20
- Post town: MORDEN
- Postcode district: SM4
- Dialling code: 020
- Police: Metropolitan
- Fire: London
- Ambulance: London
- UK Parliament: Mitcham & Morden
- London Assembly: Merton and Wandsworth

Cannon Hill is a small area within the district of Morden in the London Borough of Merton.

== History ==
It consists mostly of 1920s/30s terraced, semi-detached and a little detached housing set back slightly from spacious streets and urban avenues. It has fairly high statistics of car ownership per head.

World War II: On the night of July1st/2nd 1944 a V1 landed in Cannon Hill Lane and the residents of nearby 19, Springfield Avenue had a lucky escape. Margaret Leake (nee Hobbs) recalls that she and her brothers were asleep in bed when their father heard a doodlebug cut out. The bomb dived soundlessly to earth while “we covered our heads as the ceilings came down and I remember the lath and plaster and the glass from the windows all over my bed in the box room at the front of the house. The boys shared the back bedroom and got more of the blast, but they were not injured.” Fortunately Margaret’s parents weren’t injured either but a 16 year old was killed in a house which received a direct hit in Cannon Hill Lane ( Source: BBC Archive: World War Two People’s War).

== Governance ==
Cannon Hill is part of the Mitcham and Morden constituency for elections to the House of Commons of the United Kingdom.

Cannon Hill is part of the Cannon Hill ward for elections to Merton London Borough Council.
