= Watling Estate =

Housing estate in Burnt Oak, London

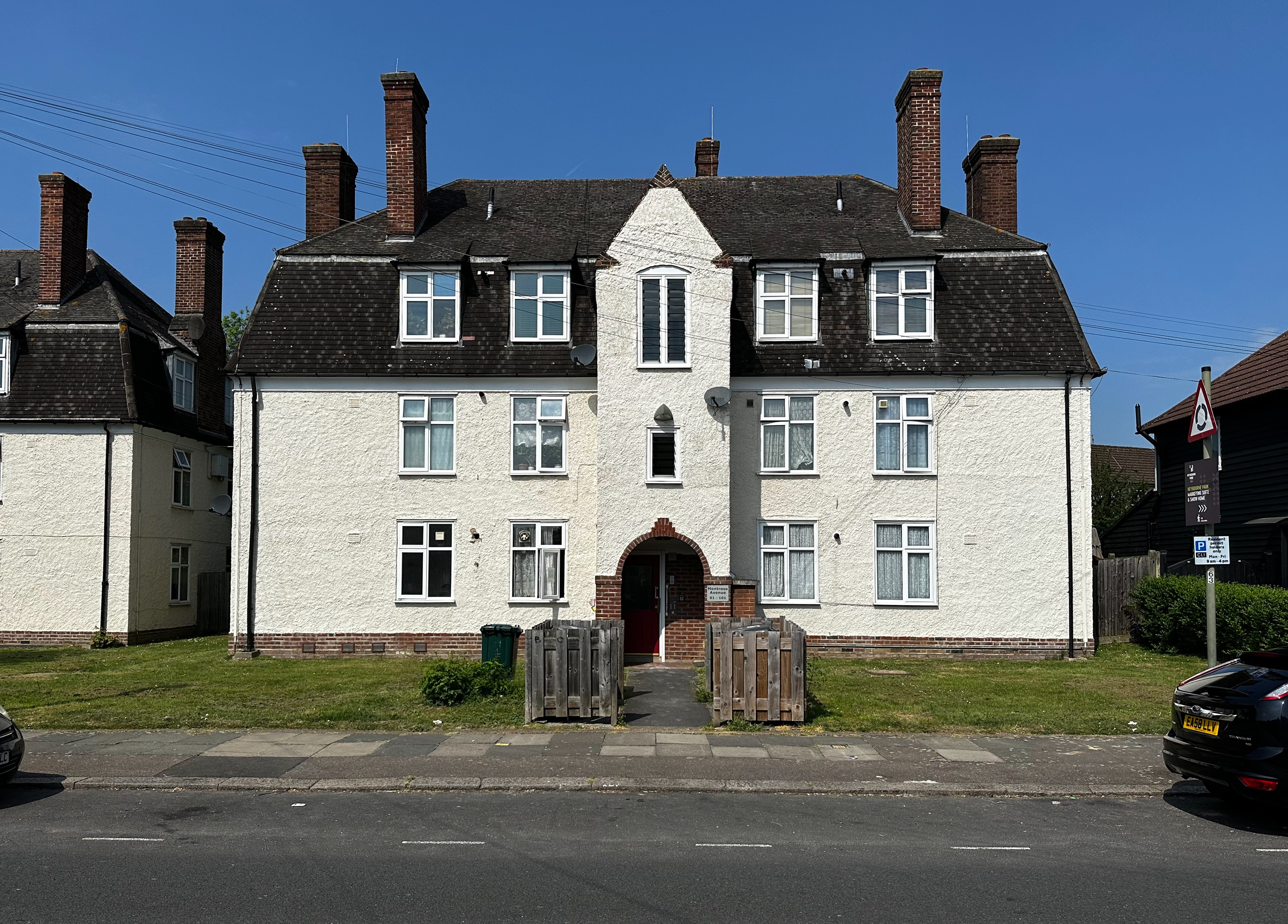
- A house on the Watling Estate
- Interactive map of Watling Estate

General information
- Location: Burnt Oak, London
- Coordinates: 51.60827°N 0.26500°W
- Status: established
- Area: 387 acres (157 ha)
- No. of units: 4021(1931), 4055(1938)

Construction
- Constructed: 1924–1931
- Architect: G. Topham Forrest
- Contractors: Direct service organisation
- Authority: London County Council
- Style: Council garden estate
- Influence: Garden city movement

The Watling Estate is in Burnt Oak, in the Edgware district of the London Borough of Barnet. It was one of twelve London County Council cottage estates built between the wars to provide "homes fit for heroes". There are 4032 homes set in 386 acres (156 ha).

== Location ==
In the 1850s, Burnt Oak referred to no more than a field on the eastern side of the Edgware Road (Watling Street). By the 1860s plans were in place to build three residential streets: North Street, East Street, and South Street. The area was generally known as Red Hill until the opening of Burnt Oak tube station on the Northern line of the London Underground on 27 October 1924. It was on farmland to the south-east of the community in Edgware Road, that London Transport constructed a new road, Watling Avenue, and London County Council built the Watling Estate housing estate. In September 1931 Jack Cohen opened his first Tesco store at 54 Watling Avenue, Burnt Oak.

== History ==
LCC cottage estates 1918–1939
Estate name	Area	No of dwellings	Population 1938	Population density
Pre-1914
Norbury	11	218	867	19.8 per acre (49/ha)
Old Oak	32	736	3519	23 per acre (57/ha)
Totterdown Fields	39	1262	—	32.4 per acre (80/ha)
Tower Gardens; White Hart Lane	98	783	5936	8 per acre (20/ha)
1919–1923
Becontree	2770	25769 (Note: Source says 2589 – transcription error)	115652	9.3 per acre (23/ha)
Bellingham	252	2673	12004	10.6 per acre (26/ha)
Castelnau	51	644	2851	12.6 per acre (31/ha)
Dover House Estate; Roehampton Estate	147	1212	5383	8.2 per acre (20/ha)
1924–1933
Downham	600	7096	30032	11.8 per acre (29/ha)
Mottingham	202	2337	9009	11.6 per acre (29/ha)
St Helier	825	9068	39877	11 per acre (27/ha)
Watling	386	4034	19110	10.5 per acre (26/ha)
Wormholt	68	783	4078	11.5 per acre (28/ha)
1934–1939
Chingford (Note: Part of a larger PRC estate around Huntsman Road)	217	1540	—	7.1 per acre (18/ha)
Hanwell (Ealing)	140	1587	6732	11.3 per acre (28/ha)
Headstone Lane	142	n.a	5000	
Kenmore Park	58	654	2078	11.3 per acre (28/ha)
Thornhill (Royal Borough of Greenwich)	21	380	1598	18.1 per acre (45/ha)
Whitefoot Lane (Downham)	49	n.a	n.a.	
Source: Yelling, J. A. (1995). "Banishing London's slums: The interwar cottage estates" (PDF). Transactions. 46. London and Middlesex Archeological Society: 167–173. Quotes: Rubinstein, 1991, Just like the country.

The Housing of the Working Classes Act 1890 (53 & 54 Vict. c. 70) encouraged the London authority to improve the housing in their areas. It also gave them the power acquire land and to build tenements and houses (cottages). The First World War indirectly provided a new impetus, when the poor physical health and condition of many urban recruits to the army was noted with alarm. This led to a campaign known as 'Homes fit for Heroes'. In 1919 the Government, through the Housing, Town Planning, &c. Act 1919 the required councils to provide housing built to the Tudor Walters standards. It helped them to do so through the provision of subsidies. These were then removed by the Geddes Axe of 1922, and partially restored by the Housing (Financial Provisions) Act 1924.

Thus LCC was actively looking for suitable land when the Northern line was extended in 1934, opening up a new transport corridor. LCC quickly purchased 387 acres (157 ha) of farmland adjacent to the new Burnt Oak tube station. The plans were drawn up by the LCC's chief architect, George Forrest. He set aside 48 acres (19 ha) for allotments and parks and 16 acres (6.5 ha) for schools and public buildings. The rest was for housing.

== Design ==
=== Planning the estate ===
In 1912 Raymond Unwin published a pamphlet Nothing gained by Overcrowding. These ideas influenced the Tudor Walters Report of 1918. The report recommended housing in short terraces, spaced at 70 feet (21 m) at a density of 12 to the acre: and this defined the Watling Estate. The estate shows all the signs of the "garden city movement". Care was taken to exploit the undulating ground, offering vistas and long views. There are cul de sacs. The terraces are indeed short and stepped back at road corners to open up the space. Throughout the estate runs the Silk Stream, and the banks have been used to create parks and internal open-space.

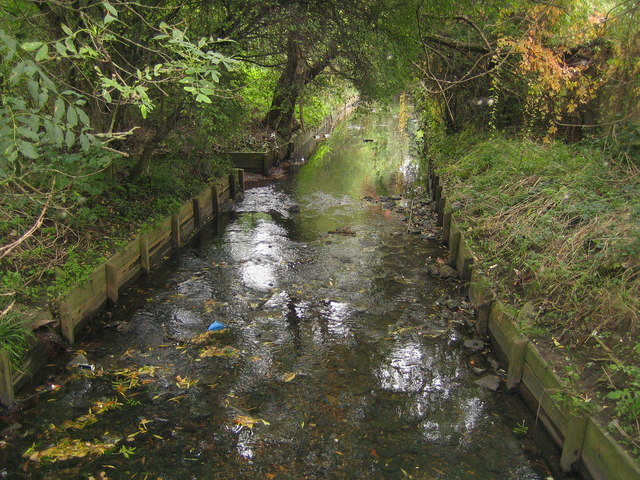
Silk Stream, from Watling Avenue

=== Houses and flats ===
Tudor Walters Committee Recommendations
House without a parlour	Area ft^{2} (m^{2})	Volume ft^{3} (m^{3})	House with a parlour	Area ft^{2} (m^{2})	Volume ft^{3} (m^{2})
			Parlour	120 (11)	960 (27)
Living Room	180 (17)	1,440 (41)	Living Room	180 (17)	1,440 (41)
Scullery	80 (7.4)	640 (18)	Scullery	80 (7.4)	640 (18)
Larder	24 (2.2)	-	Larder	24 (2.2)	-
Bedroom No. 1	150 (14)	1,200 (34)	Bedroom No. 1	160 (15)	1,280 (36)
Bedroom No. 2	100 (9.3)	800 (23)	Bedroom No. 2	120 (11)	960 (27)
Bedroom No. 3	65 (6.0)	520 (15)	Bedroom No. 3	110 (10)	880 (25)
Total	855 ft^{2} (79.4 m^{2})			1,055 ft^{2} (98.0 m^{2})	
Desirable Minimum sizes – Tudor Walters Committee

There were 4012 dwellings on the estate. Most were traditional brick; there were 252 'Atholl' steel and 464 timber-frame homes built as experiments. It was hoped that they would be cheaper and quicker to build. Most were larger family homes: there was a mix of parlour and non-parlour types. There were also around 320 flats, built in low-rise blocks.

=== The facilities ===
The main shopping parade on Watling Avenue was built in 1930. The first school opened in 1928, the large Watling Central School in 1931.

== Community ==
The initial tenants were selected by London County Council. Like other estates, they were a relatively well-off though overwhelmingly working-class population with small families. 20% were skilled manual, 20% transport workers and 10% clerical with wages between £3 and £4 a week. Almost half of the incomers were under 18.

The estate was seen as a threat by the older citizens of Edgware who dubbed it "Little Moscow". and likened the initiative to one of the "raw, red tentacles of that housing octopus, the London County Council".

== Conservation area ==
The Watling Estate was made a conservation area in 2007.

== See also ==
- Downham Estate
