= Housing in London =

Housing in London has spanned several different eras and governance arrangements, and consists of stock with a diverse range of types and types of tenure with affordability varying considerably.

== History ==
=== Metropolis ===
The Metropolitan Buildings Act 1844 established requirements on "dwelling houses" to have windows for cellars, and prohibited the facilities involving trades that used animal remains such as butchers, cattle slaughters, soap boilers and blood boilers from being built within 50 feet of dwellings. The population of London had grown from approximately 800,000 to 2,250,000, since the passage of the last significant building regulation in 1774, the Building Act 1774.

During the time of the Metropolitan Board of Works and the Metropolis Management Act 1855, individual metropolitan boroughs were responsible for housing.

=== London County Council ===
For the first three years, the London County Council operated with a political consensus across the Labour Party, the Liberal Party, and the Conservatives, on the need to remove slums, and all three groups attempted to prevent housing proposals from becoming politicised.

Between 1892 and 1895, the Labour Party and the Liberal Party were able to push through a program for public housing. Betwrrn 1895 and 1898, the LCC was equally divided between the Liberals and Labour on one side and the Conservatives on the other side. Labour and the Liberals gained a majority in 1898, which lasted until 1907. From 1907 to World War I, the Conservatives continued the policy of building in the suburbs.

The LCC became the local authority designated with responsibility for the preparation of town planning schemes for its area, under the Housing, Town Planning, etc. Act 1909. The Housing, Town Planning, &c. Act 1919 provided for local authority housing subsidies.

From 1934 and onwards, the LCC was dominated by Labour.

Between 1945 and 1949, the LCC built 44,000 new homes in London alone. The LCC bought certain properties, such as the Pepys Estate, which it bought from the admiralty in 1958.

==== List of housing developments ====
| Estate | Location | Type | Dates of construction |
|---|---|---|---|
| Alton | Roehampton, Wandsworth | suburban | |
| Aveley | South Ockendon | out-county | |
| Becontree | Barking/Dagenham/Ilford | out-county | 1919–1934 |
| Bellingham Estate | Catford | suburban | |
| Borehamwood | Borehamwood | out-county | |
| Boundary | Shoreditch | inner-city | 1889-1914 |
| Castelnau Estate | Barnes | out-county | |
| Debden | Loughton | out-county | |
| Dover House Estate | Roehampton | suburban | 1920–1927 |
| Downham | Lewisham/Bromley | suburban | |
| Mottingham | Lewisham/Bromley/Greenwich | out-county | |
| Cuckoo Estate | Hanwell | out-county | |
| Harold Hill | Romford | out-county | |
| Hainault | Chigwell/Ilford/Dagenham | out-county | |
| Kingswood Estate | Southwark | suburban | 1950s |
| Lansbury | Poplar | inner-city | |
| Millbank | Westminster | inner-city | |
| Merstham | Surrey | out-county | |
| Norbury | Norbury | out-county | 1906–10 |
| Old Oak | Hammersmith | suburban | |
| Oxhey | South Oxhey | out-county | |
| St Helier | Morden | out-county | 1928–36 |
| Totterdown Fields | Tooting | suburban | 1903–11 |
| St Paul's Cray | Orpington | out-county | |
| Watling Estate | Burnt Oak | out-county | 1926–30 |
| Whitefoot Lane | Catford | suburban | |
| White Hart Lane Estate | Tottenham | suburban | |
| Wormholt | Hammersmith | suburban | |

=== Greater London Council and the London boroughs ===
The Greater London Council shared responsibility for housing with individual borough councils and the Corporation of London. Outer boroughs restricted their co-operation with the GLC due to what they saw as the GLC exporting Labour-voting council tenants to the suburbs.

In the 1960s and the 1970s, the GLC had a policy of segregating ethnic minority and white residents, on the assumption that they would rather live separately.

=== List of housing developments ===
| Estate | Location | Type | Dates of construction |
|---|---|---|---|
| Central Hill Estate | Lambeth | out-county | |
| Cressingham Gardens Estate | Lambeth | out-county | |

=== Local Government Act 1985 ===
The Local Government Act 1985 abolished the Greater London Council, transferring all of its responsibilities to the borough councils and the Corporation of London.

=== Greater London Authority and the London boroughs ===
The Greater London Authority Act 2007 made the Greater London Authority for the allocation of funding for social housing and housing designated as affordable, and placed a duty on the Mayor of London to publish a housing strategy.

The GLA's allocation of funding under the British Government's Social and Affordable Homes Programme is known as the London SAHP. In August 2026, the GLA announced that 60% of its allocation of funding under the LSAHP would go directly to local authorities for development.

== Types of housing ==
=== Houses ===
In 2021, in London, 48.5% of homes were houses or bungalows, compared to England as a whole, where 77.3% of homes were houses or bungalows.

=== Flats ===
==== Highrise buildings and tower blocks ====
London has hundreds of tower blocks with estimates of the exact number varying considerably. In 2021, in London, 11.7% of homes were in buildings which had six or more storeys, compared to England as a whole, where 2.7% of homes were houses or bungalows.

==== Midrise and lowrise buildings ====
In 2021, in London, 42.5% of homes were in buildings which had two to five storeys, compared to England as a whole, where 20.0% of homes were in buildings which had two to five storeys.

In 2021, 88% of London's homes were in low-rise buildings, significantly higher than Tokyo, New York and Paris. The London Assembly Planning and Regeneration Committee has suggested that midrise development should be the mid-rise housing its ‘preferred development.

== Types of tenure and ownership ==
=== Owner occupancy ===
Compared to the rest of England, London has significantly fewer houses in owner occupancy.

=== Social housing ===
The total social housing stock at 1 April 2025 consisted of 821,517 dwellings. The average weekly rent in social housing was £149.48.

In 2019-2020, there were 24,437 general needs lettings and 9,651 social housing lettings.

==== Supported housing ====
In 2025, there were 74,790 supported housing units in London, with 34,505 (46%) in Inner London and 40,285 (54%) in Outer London. Those making use of supported housing are more likely to be at retirement age or older than those making use of general needs housing.

==== Local authorities ====
In 2019-2020, local authorities provided 13,225 lettings for social housing.

==== Housing associations ====
In 2019-2020, housing associations provided 20,864 lettings.

The G15 represents the largest housing associations in London, and collectively are responsible for managing appropriately 600,000 homes in London.

=== Private rented sector ===
The median amount of annual rental income in London was £24,500.

=== Leasehold ===
As of 2024, in London, 38% of dwellings are leasehold dwellings. This is made up of 95.1% of flats being leasehold flats, and 4.9% of houses being leasehold houses. This compares to a national average of 19% of dwellings, 27.9% of houses, and 72.1% of flats, being of leasehold stock. Part of why London has a higher proportion of its dwellings being of leasehold stock, is because London has a significantly higher proportion of its housing stock being flats rather than houses.

In the 2021 London mayoral election and 2024 London mayoral election, Sadiq Khan announced a policy to create a pilot commonhold scheme. As of April 2026, no such scheme has been established. The London Assembly member, Andrew Boff for not requiring proposed developments to be commonhold, rather than leasehold, to receive GLA funding.

=== Shared ownership ===
In London there are 48,000 shared ownership households.

=== Housing co-operatives ===
There are over 300 housing cooperatives in London, with the number of housing cooperatives in London taking a larger share of the number of co-operatives in London, than the proportion of co-operatives in the UK that are housing cooperatives.

The first local authority tenants’ management co-operative in England and Wales was the Stephen and Matilda Tenants’ Co-operative, a result of negotiations between Tower Hamlets residents, the Greater London Council, and the Department of the Environment. In the 1990s, housing co-operatives built entire streets of housing in London.

== Housing shortage ==
Between 2015 and 2026, there was a collapse in housebuilding in London. In 2025, construction began on 5,547 new private-sector residential homes, compared to 2015, when there were 33,782 new private-sector residential homes.

== Homelessness ==
In London, in 2026, 2.11% of households were living in temporary accommodation, compared to 0.55% of households in England living in temporary accommodation.

== Issues ==
=== Cladding crisis ===
Since the Grenfell Tower fire in 2017, certain types of cladding have been found to be unsafe. In 2022, London contained 268 of the 481 buildings with Grenfell-style ACM cladding.

=== Mould ===
A 2025 report by Uswitch found that eight of the ten local authorities receiving the most complaints in England were in London.

=== Service charges ===
Service charges are paid by tenants to their landlords, or by leaseholders to their freeholders. Between 2016 and 2024, the average annual service charge in London increased by 52% to £2,500.

=== Underoccupancy and overcrowding ===
The Office for National Statistics defines under-occupancy and overcrowding in terms of what is known as the "bedroom standard". The bedroom standard is a calculation according to a formula written by the government based on "age/sex/marital status composition and the relationship of the members to one another" and is used to determine if a particular dwelling has enough bedrooms for a particular family.

Across all English regions and Wales, London had the highest level of overcrowding across all accommodation.

In the 2021 census, London had a higher rate of overcrowding (11.1%) compared to England overall (4.4%). In the 2021 census, London had a lower rate of under occupancy (48.8%) compared to England overall (76.3%).

== Policies ==
=== Policies of the Mayor of London ===
The London Plan sets out targets for boroughs for how much dwellings they should deliver in their areas.

In 2026, the Mayor of London announced a scheme to increase training opportunities for training in the construction sector.

=== Local plans ===
Local authorities are responsible for publishing "local plans" which detail their planning policies including on matters such as housing. The City of London refers to its local plan as the "city plan"..

=== British Government ===
Restrictions on immigration have been repeatedly criticised by the National Federation of Builders for reducing the number of bricklayers, plasterers, roofers and carpenters available to work in the UK and in London.

== See also ==
- Housing in the United Kingdom
