= London County Council cottage estates =

Type of housing estate in London

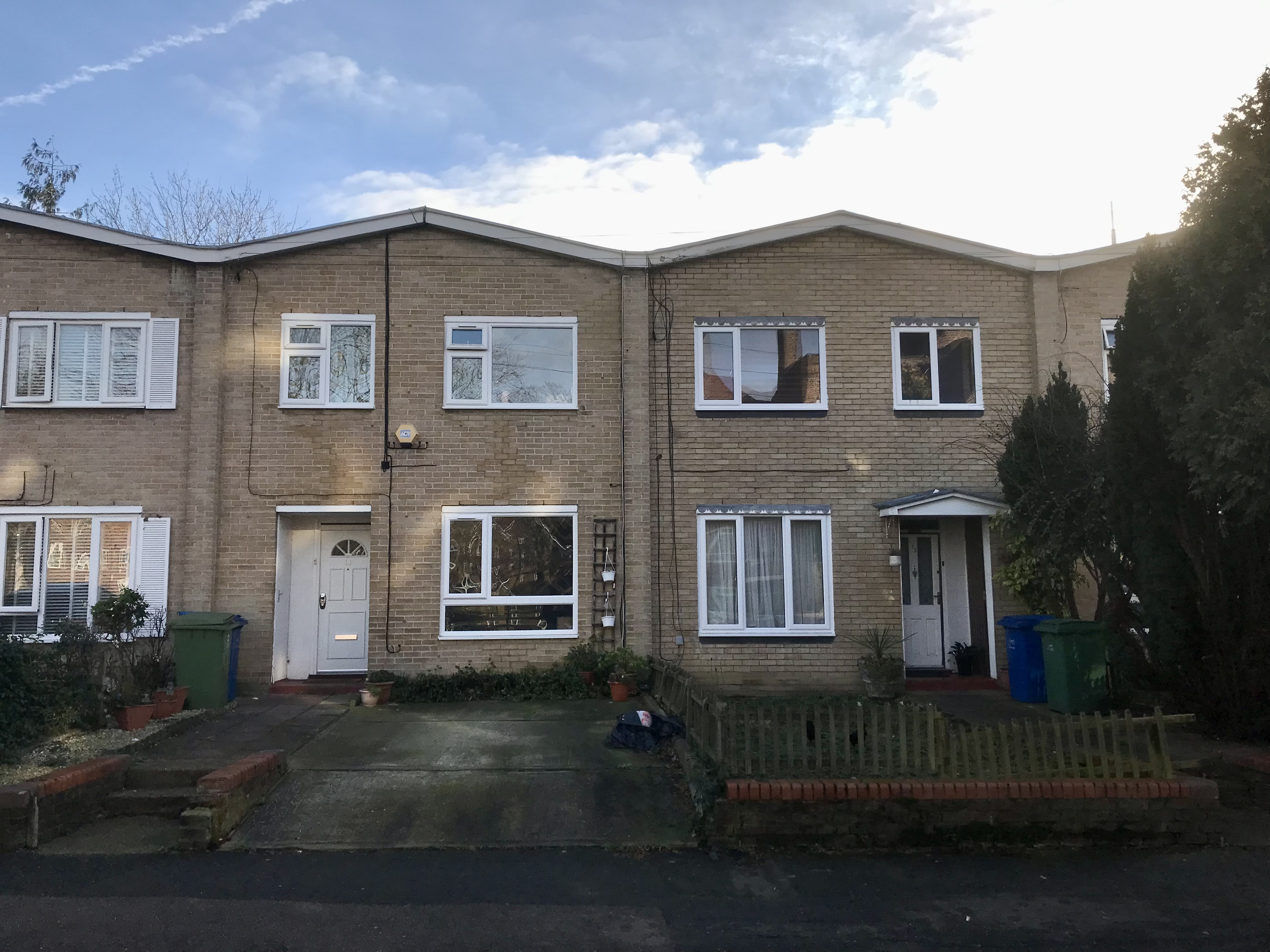
- A pair of LCC cottages on Kingswood Estate, built c. 1950s

General information
- Type: Cottage
- Classification: Council house
- Location: London, England
- Year built: Largely 1918-1939
- Construction started: 1889
- Construction stopped: 1965

London County Council cottage estates are estates of council houses, built by London County Council, in the main between 1918 and 1939.

== Council-built housing ==
The City of London Corporation built tenements in the Farringdon Road in 1865, but this was an isolated instance. The first council to build housing as an integrated policy was Liverpool Corporation, starting with St Martin's Cottages in Ashfield Street, Vauxhall, completed in 1869. That year a royal commission was held, as the state had taken an interest in housing and housing policy. This led to the Housing of the Working Classes Act 1890 (53 & 54 Vict. c. 70), which encouraged the London authority to improve the housing in their areas. It also gave them the power acquire land and to build tenements and houses (cottages). As a consequence London County Council opened the Boundary Estate in 1900, a block dwelling estate of tenements in Tower Hamlets.

The first four cottage estates were at Norbury, Old Oak, Totterdown Fields and White Hart Lane.

== Homes fit for heroes – interwar policy ==
In 1912 Raymond Unwin, published a pamphlet Nothing gained by Overcrowding. He worked on the influential Tudor Walters Report of 1918, which recommended housing in short terraces, spaced at 70 feet (21 m) at a density of 12 to the acre. The First World War indirectly provided a new impetus, when the poor physical health and condition of many urban recruits to the army was noted with alarm. This led to a campaign known as Homes fit for heroes. In 1919 the government, through the Housing, Town Planning, &c. Act 1919 required councils to provide housing built to the Tudor Walters standards, helping them to do so through the provision of subsidies.

Tudor Walters Committee Recommendations
	House without a parlour		House with a parlour	
Room	Area ft^{2} (m^{2})	Volume ft^{3} (m^{3})	Area ft^{2} (m^{2})	Volume ft^{3} (m^{3})
Parlour			120 (11)	960 (27)
Living Room	180 (17)	1,440 (41)	180 (17)	1,440 (41)
Scullery	80 (7.4)	640 (18)	80 (7.4)	640 (18)
Larder	24 (2.2)	-	24 (2.2)	-
Bedroom No. 1	150 (14)	1,200 (34)	160 (15)	1,280 (36)
Bedroom No. 2	100 (9.3)	800 (23)	120 (11)	960 (27)
Bedroom No. 3	65 (6.0)	520 (15)	110 (10)	880 (25)
Total	855 ft^{2} (79.4 m^{2})		1,055 ft^{2} (98.0 m^{2})	
Desirable Minimum sizes- Tudor Walters Committee

London County Council embraced these freedoms and planned eight cottage estates in the peripheries of London: Becontree, St Helier, Downham, Watling for example; seven further followed including Bellingham. Houses were built on green field land on the peripheries of urban London.

LCC cottage estates 1918–1939
Estate name	Area	No of dwellings	Population 1938	Population density
Pre-1914
Norbury	11	218	867	19.8 per acre (49/ha)
Old Oak	32	736	3519	23 per acre (57/ha)
Totterdown Fields	39	1262	—	32.4 per acre (80/ha)
Tower Gardens; White Hart Lane	98	783	5936	8 per acre (20/ha)
1919–1923
Becontree	2770	25769 (Note: Source says 2589 – transcription error)	115652	9.3 per acre (23/ha)
Bellingham	252	2673	12004	10.6 per acre (26/ha)
Castelnau	51	644	2851	12.6 per acre (31/ha)
Dover House Estate; Roehampton Estate	147	1212	5383	8.2 per acre (20/ha)
1924–1933
Downham	600	7096	30032	11.8 per acre (29/ha)
Mottingham	202	2337	9009	11.6 per acre (29/ha)
St Helier	825	9068	39877	11 per acre (27/ha)
Watling	386	4034	19110	10.5 per acre (26/ha)
Wormholt	68	783	4078	11.5 per acre (28/ha)
1934–1939
Chingford (Note: Part of a larger PRC estate around Huntsman Road)	217	1540	—	7.1 per acre (18/ha)
Hanwell (Ealing)	140	1587	6732	11.3 per acre (28/ha)
Headstone Lane	142	n.a	5000	
Kenmore Park	58	654	2078	11.3 per acre (28/ha)
Thornhill (Royal Borough of Greenwich)	21	380	1598	18.1 per acre (45/ha)
Whitefoot Lane (Downham)	49	n.a	n.a.	
Source: Yelling, J. A. (1995). "Banishing London's slums: The interwar cottage estates" (PDF). Transactions. 46. London and Middlesex Archeological Society: 167–173. Quotes: Rubinstein, 1991, Just like the country.

The Housing, Town Planning, &c. Act 1919 provided subsidies solely to local authorities and not to private builders. Many houses were built over the next few years in cottage estates. Following the Geddes Axe of 1922, the Housing, &c. Act 1923 stopped subsidies going to council houses but did extend subsidies to private builders.

The first Labour government took office in 1924. The Housing (Financial Provisions) Act 1924 restored subsidies to municipal housing but at a lower level. It failed to make any provision for the lower paid, who were living in the worst conditions, and could not afford to pay the higher rents of the new houses.

Examples of these were built at the Downham Estate in London, Blocks of flats were also built.

== Design of the estates ==
This was dictated by the topology and the desired densities.

== Design of the houses ==
Most of the houses were brick built, but due to the shortage of bricks and wood in the early 1920s, and the availability of factories tooled up for war work some interesting experimental designs and prefabrications.

== Furnishing the house ==
An advertisement offering to complete furnish an Atholl all-steel house in Downham for £78.17.11d, gave a full list of what was needed.

== See also ==
- List of the 19 LCC cottage estates
- List of large council estates in the UK
- Housing in the United Kingdom
- Public housing ("projects")

== Bibliography ==
- "History of Council Housing". University of the West of England. 2008. Archived from the original on 3 December 2015.
- Parkinson-Bailey, John J. (2000). Manchester: an Architectural History. Manchester: Manchester University Press. ISBN 0-7190-5606-3.
- Burnett, John (1986). A social history of housing : 1815–1985 (2nd e. ed.). New York: Methuen. ISBN 0416367801.
- Hanley, Lynsey (2012). Estates : an intimate history (New ed.). Granta: Granta. ISBN 9781847087027.
- Hollow, Matthew (2011). "Suburban Ideals on England's Interwar Council Estates".
- Manoochehri, Jamileh (2009). "Social policy and housing: reflections of social values - UCL Discovery" (PDF): 413.
- Meek, James (2014). "Where shall we live". London Review of Books. 36 (1): 7–16.
- Panagidis; Savva (2015). "Entry #411:Southwyck Open House". Designing the Urban Common. Theatrum Mundi.
- "Case Studies - Progress Estate". ideal-homes.org.uk.
- de Pennington, Joanne (2011). "Beneath the Surface: A Country of Two Nations". BBC History.
- Rubinstein, Antonia; Andrews, Andy; Schweitzer, Pam (1991). "Just like the country" (PDF). Age Exchange.
- Rubinstein, Antonia; Andrews, Andy; Schweitzer, Pam (1991). "Just like the country part 2" (PDF). Age Exchange.
- Yelling, J.A. (1995). "Banishing London's slums: The interwar cottage estates" (PDF). Transactions. 46. London and Middlesex Archeological Society: 167–173.
- "Council Housing". Living Heritage-Improving towns. UK Parliament.
