= Catholic Church of St Osmund, Barnes =

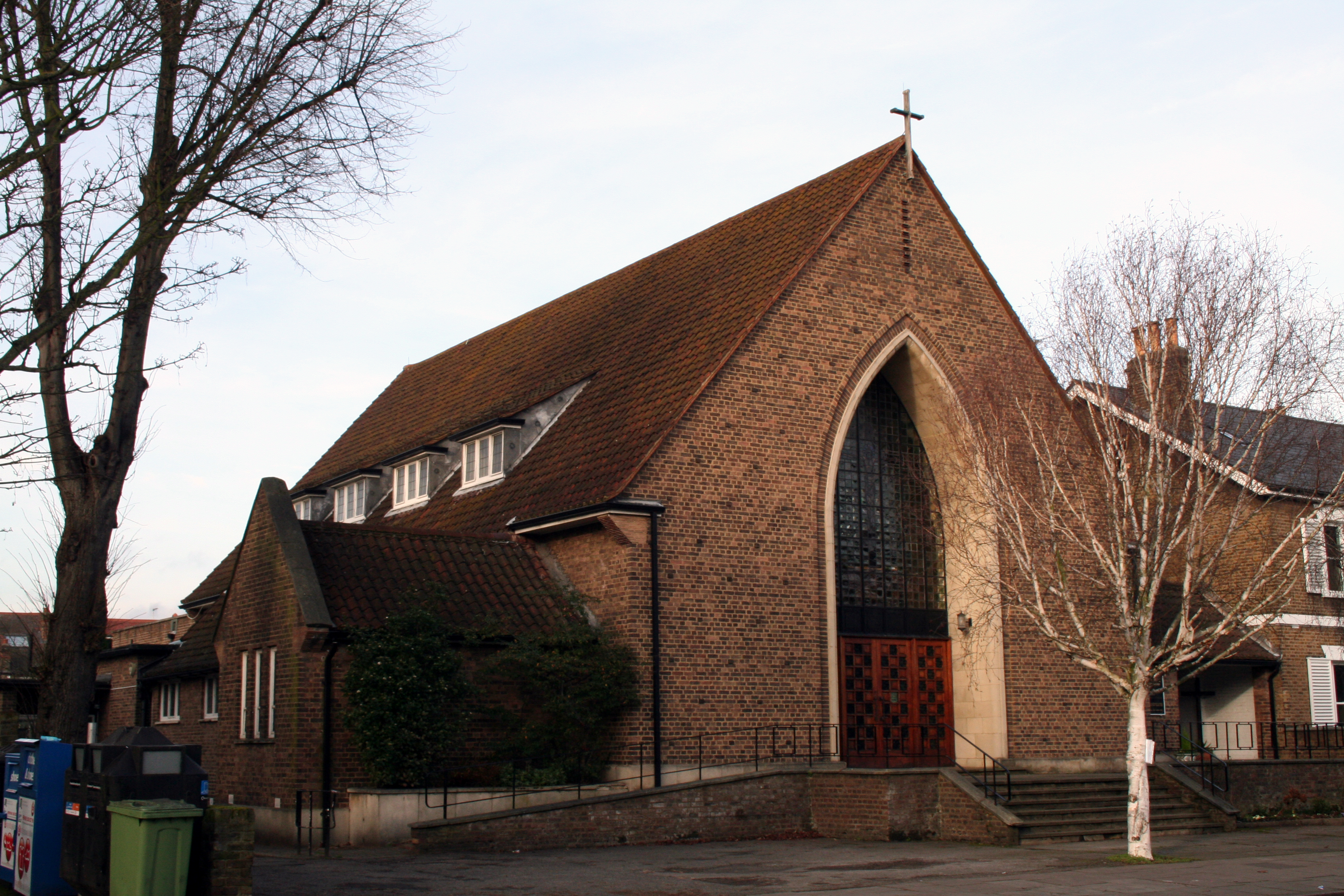
- Catholic Church of St Osmund, Barnes
- 51°28′49.7″N 0°14′15.3″W
- OS grid reference: TQ 22480 77196
- Location: 79 Castelnau, Barnes, London
- Country: England
- Denomination: Roman Catholic
- Website: stosmunds.parishportal.net

Architecture
- Architect: Ronald Hardy
- Years built: 1958

Specifications
- Materials: Brick

Administration
- Province: Southwark
- Diocese: Roman Catholic Archdiocese of Southwark
- Deanery: Mortlake
- Parish: Barnes

The Catholic Church of St Osmund, Barnes is a Roman Catholic church in Castelnau, Barnes, London. The church is affiliated to Churches Together in Barnes. The parish is part of the Archdiocese of Southwark.

The church was built in 1958. The architect was Ronald Hardy.
