= Dover House Estate =

Housing estate in London

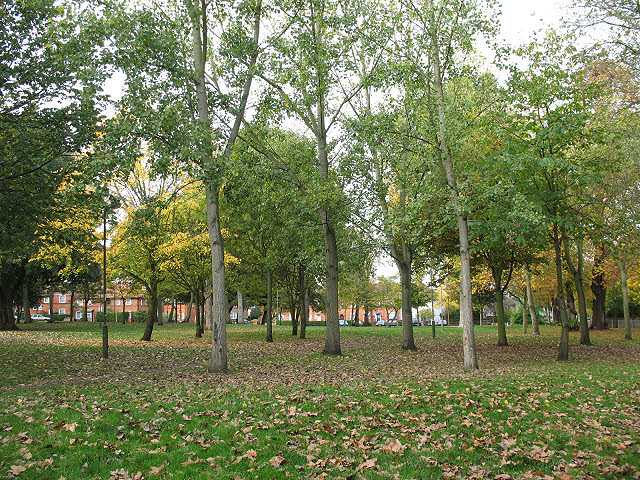
- The Pleasance, a green space within the estate.
- Interactive map of Dover House Estate

General information
- Location: Roehampton, London
- Coordinates: 51.4607°N 0.2397°W
- Status: conservation area (19 September 1978)
- Area: 147 acres (59 ha)
- No. of units: 1212 houses

Construction
- Constructed: 1919 to 1929
- Authority: London County Council
- Style: Cottage Estate
- Influence: Garden city movement, Arts and Crafts movement

Other information
- Governing body: Wandsworth Conservation & Design Group

Dover House Estate is one of a number of important London County Council cottage estates inspired by the Garden city movement. The land was previously the estates of two large houses, Dover House and Putney Park House, which were purchased by the London County Council soon after World War I. Dover House was demolished for the new estate, but Putney Park House remains.

== Context ==
Roehampton emerged as a favoured residential suburb of the 18th and 19th centuries following the opening of Putney Bridge in 1729 and the development of a number of large private estates from which several of the largest original houses survive. Roehampton House (grade I) by Thomas Archer was built between 1710–12 and enlarged by Sir Edwin Lutyens in 1910. Parkstead House (grade I) built in 1750 for William Ponsonby, 2nd Earl of Bessborough, now forms part of the University of Roehampton. Mount Clare (grade I) built in 1772 for George Clive, cousin of Lord Clive, which forms part of the University of Roehampton, along with Grove House (grade II*), built originally for Sir Joshua Vanneck in 1777 (also now owned by the university). Capability Brown is reputed to have laid out the grounds. The university also owns Downshire House (grade II*); built in 1770 and once occupied by the Marquess of Downshire. Dramatic change came to Roehampton when the London County Council (LCC) built the Roehampton Estate in the 1920s and 1930s (renamed the Dover House Estate or the Dover House Road Estate). Later, in the 1950 the neighbouring Alton Estate was built.

== History ==
In 1919, London County Council proposed an estate of about 1200 houses on the Putney House, and Dover House parkland, to fulfil a policy designed to relieve the pressure for 'Homes fit for heroes'. The Housing Act of 1919 incorporated generous subsidies for local authorities to build affordable housing for rent. The estate was meticulously planned with houses in short symmetrical terraces and pairs, with every house having a vista over green space. It was to be a self-contained community with a school and rows of shops. The layout where possible preserved prominent trees; the trees on the Pleasnace can be seen on 1787 Corris map.

Building started from the Upper Richmond Road and progressed to the Crestway. The first houses were completed in late 1920, but a financial overrun delayed the completion until 1927. The roads and sewers were in place in October 1921; H. Woodham and Sons was the contractor. 1921.

The housing was only let to families where the man had a permanent job which limited it further to whitecollar workers and a limited number of blue collar workers. The first tenants were civil servants, teachers and bus drivers. LCC did not allow tenants to make any changes to the outside of the property or even alter the design of the parlour. This continued until the 1950s. Council contractors would cut the front hedges each summer to maintain a uniform height and appearance. It was a model estate.

In the 1970s, the Newnes path development was built over the northern allotments, and a sheltered housing scheme built over St Margaret's Parish Hall.

Private ownership has damaged the integrity of the overall design, with hard standings replacing some gardens and renovations to the cladding and the windows breaking up the previous unity of the design, the area was made into a Conservation Area in 1978, to protect it by removing PD rights, and a management strategy put in place to encourage owners to reinstate original features.

In the 1990s, the Vanneck Square development was built on the site of the former Huntingfield School. In 1991 Wandsworth Council was granted special powers by the then Department of the Environment to control virtually all alterations to the external appearance of houses on the Estate under an Article 4 Direction.

== Design ==
The common characteristic of the LCC cottage estates is picturesque housing influenced by the Arts and Crafts style.

LCC cottage estates 1918–1939
Estate name	Area	No of dwellings	Population 1938	Population density
Pre-1914
Norbury	11	218	867	19.8 per acre (49/ha)
Old Oak	32	736	3519	23 per acre (57/ha)
Totterdown Fields	39	1262	—	32.4 per acre (80/ha)
Tower Gardens; White Hart Lane	98	783	5936	8 per acre (20/ha)
1919–1923
Becontree	2770	25769 (Note: Source says 2589 – transcription error)	115652	9.3 per acre (23/ha)
Bellingham	252	2673	12004	10.6 per acre (26/ha)
Castelnau	51	644	2851	12.6 per acre (31/ha)
Dover House Estate; Roehampton Estate	147	1212	5383	8.2 per acre (20/ha)
1924–1933
Downham	600	7096	30032	11.8 per acre (29/ha)
Mottingham	202	2337	9009	11.6 per acre (29/ha)
St Helier	825	9068	39877	11 per acre (27/ha)
Watling	386	4034	19110	10.5 per acre (26/ha)
Wormholt	68	783	4078	11.5 per acre (28/ha)
1934–1939
Chingford (Note: Part of a larger PRC estate around Huntsman Road)	217	1540	—	7.1 per acre (18/ha)
Hanwell (Ealing)	140	1587	6732	11.3 per acre (28/ha)
Headstone Lane	142	n.a	5000	
Kenmore Park	58	654	2078	11.3 per acre (28/ha)
Thornhill (Royal Borough of Greenwich)	21	380	1598	18.1 per acre (45/ha)
Whitefoot Lane (Downham)	49	n.a	n.a.	
Source: Yelling, J. A. (1995). "Banishing London's slums: The interwar cottage estates" (PDF). Transactions. 46. London and Middlesex Archeological Society: 167–173. Quotes: Rubinstein, 1991, Just like the country.

=== Layout ===
It was the intention at Dover House Estate to create housing in groups that overlooked or had access to open space, to provide a sense of intimacy and individuality, and the estate was laid out with communal green spaces. Allotments were also provided in three backland areas behind houses, two of which remain, the third subsequently infilled by housing.

=== Houses ===
The 'cottages' were designed in groups or terraces of between 2 and 18 dwellings. Each group was symmetrical so the group appears as one building. Each house was lit by gas, and the hotwater was provided by a boiler in the kitchen, a hand pump was used to raise the hot water to the bath room. There was considerable variety of design between different groups.

The majority of the groups were built of London stock brick. Some had contrasting brick coursing and occasionally decorative patterns in diaperwork. Some of the groups at the northern end of the estate have a roughcast render that was painted cream. The roofing structures were used to give pattern to the groups. They were basically of two types: the conventional double-pitched roof, sometimes with gabled ends and sometimes with a hipped end, feature gables would be symmetrically introduced; then there were cottages with eaves at the first floor level that had dormer windows and a half-hipped end. A group on Huntingfield Road had a mansard roof. The eaves project prominently but with no visible facia boards and there are no barge boards on the gables. The roofs were tiles or slated, and groups use plain clay, interlocking Double-Roman(pantile), interlocking Courtrai pantile, interlocking terracotta (Marseille) or Delabole and Westmoreland slate. It is an aim of the Management Strategy to maintain these.

The doors are of two principal sorts: a panelled door with six top panes, a panelled door with nine top panes. The windows have multiple small panes, larger glass not being readily available in that decade. The window were, depending on the group, either wooden casement, wooden rising sash or more commonly metal 'Crittall Windows'.

== Conservation area ==
London County Council was very diligent in maintaining the appearance and integrity of the estate but as more and more properties passed into private hands the estate started to deteriorate, and the succeeding council did not have the powers to arrest the decline. The privet hedges were uprooted and replaced with a mish-mash of wooden, brick and metal fences and gates. Front gardens were lost to hardstandings for cars. The plain brickwork was rendered, pebble-dashed or stone-clad destroying the visual unity of the terrace. Windows have been replaced in an unsympathetic way – the resulting UPVC not following the original small pane pattern, and even in some cases the opening was enlarged or the shape was changed.

To protect this valuable LCC cottage estate, conservation area status was granted in 1978. Wandsworth council suggested and part-funded some ways to restore the estate. In 1991 the council was granted special powers by the then Department of the Environment to control virtually all alterations to the external appearance of houses on the Estate. These powers were granted under a provision of planning legislation known as an Article 4 Direction.

=== The Article 4 direction ===
The Article 4 direction means that the following changes need planning permission:

- External alterations to houses which would be visible from the street; i.e. all front elevations and some side and rear elevations; this includes the replacement of windows and doors.
- Changes to the roofs of houses; including re-roofing in a different material.
- Laying out hard surfaced areas, e.g. for car parking within the front and some side garden areas of houses.
- Building walls, fences or gates on front boundaries, which face a road or footpath.
- Demolition of buildings and some front boundaries*.
- Painting the outside walls of houses and flats, except the painting of rough- cast or render in one of the approved colours, light beige, cream or off - white.
