= Downham Estate =

Housing estate in Downham, London

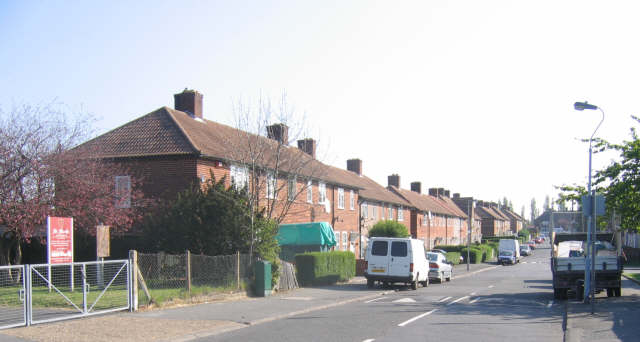
- Downham Estate
- Interactive map of Downham Estate

General information
- Location: Downham Estate, Downham Way, Lewisham, London
- Coordinates: 51.429784°N 0.005100°E,
- Area: 522 acres (211 ha)

Construction
- Architect: George Topham Forrest
- Authority: London County Council

The Downham Estate is a London County Council cottage estate in Downham, south east London. It is in the London Borough of Lewisham

The Downham Estate provides an example of the programme of building council housing occurring in Britain between the First and Second World Wars. The estate was constructed between 1924 and 1930 to plans by the LCC architect George Topham Forrest. One of the first houses to be completed was ceremonially opened in 1927 by King George V.

Among other similar developments around London (for example Becontree), it was developed to help alleviate the chronic shortage of housing in London, partly brought about by the complete cessation of building during World War I. It was intended to show what could be achieved by public-sector house-building: particularly in order to provide better housing for those who had lived in the slums of the city. The building of the Estate attracted subsidies from central government and was constructed under the auspices of the London County Council.

The estate covered an area of 522 acres (2.1 km^{2}), of which 461 acres (1.9 km^{2}) were in the Metropolitan Borough of Lewisham, (from 1965 the London Borough of Lewisham) and 61 acres (0.2 km^{2}) in the Municipal Borough of Bromley (from 1965 the London Borough of Bromley); altogether it covered a distance of 1.25 miles (2 km). The land had previously been mainly rural although around Grove Park railway station in the east of the area there had been some development; between Lewisham and Bromley was virtually the end of London at that time. 5659 houses were constructed of varying sizes; and there were also 408 flats (apartments) in blocks up to four storeys in height.

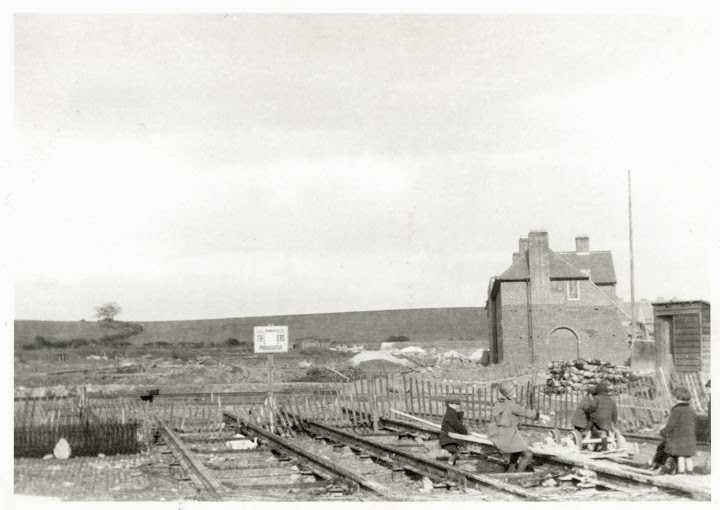
Downham Estate, under construction in 1926

Downham was named in honour of Lord Downham, who was chairman of the London County Council during 1919–20. The first tenants of the estate were mainly former residents of inner city areas, such as Rotherhithe and the accommodation was spacious and luxurious compared with their former dwellings.

LCC cottage estates 1918–1939
Estate name	Area	No of dwellings	Population 1938	Population density
Pre-1914
Norbury	11	218	867	19.8 per acre (49/ha)
Old Oak	32	736	3519	23 per acre (57/ha)
Totterdown Fields	39	1262	—	32.4 per acre (80/ha)
Tower Gardens; White Hart Lane	98	783	5936	8 per acre (20/ha)
1919–1923
Becontree	2770	25769 (Note: Source says 2589 – transcription error)	115652	9.3 per acre (23/ha)
Bellingham	252	2673	12004	10.6 per acre (26/ha)
Castelnau	51	644	2851	12.6 per acre (31/ha)
Dover House Estate; Roehampton Estate	147	1212	5383	8.2 per acre (20/ha)
1924–1933
Downham	600	7096	30032	11.8 per acre (29/ha)
Mottingham	202	2337	9009	11.6 per acre (29/ha)
St Helier	825	9068	39877	11 per acre (27/ha)
Watling	386	4034	19110	10.5 per acre (26/ha)
Wormholt	68	783	4078	11.5 per acre (28/ha)
1934–1939
Chingford (Note: Part of a larger PRC estate around Huntsman Road)	217	1540	—	7.1 per acre (18/ha)
Hanwell (Ealing)	140	1587	6732	11.3 per acre (28/ha)
Headstone Lane	142	n.a	5000	
Kenmore Park	58	654	2078	11.3 per acre (28/ha)
Thornhill (Royal Borough of Greenwich)	21	380	1598	18.1 per acre (45/ha)
Whitefoot Lane (Downham)	49	n.a	n.a.	
Source: Yelling, J. A. (1995). "Banishing London's slums: The interwar cottage estates" (PDF). Transactions. 46. London and Middlesex Archeological Society: 167–173. Quotes: Rubinstein, 1991, Just like the country.
