= Norbury Estate =

Coordinates: 51.406722°N 0.130664°W

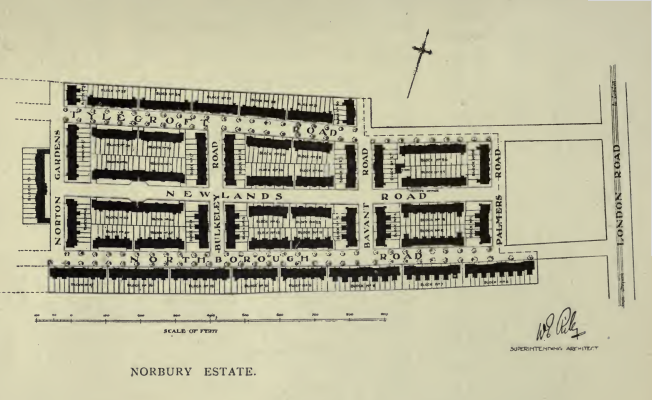
Plan of the Norbury Estate from the Report of the Housing for the Working Classes Committee, London County Council, 1912–1913

The Norbury Estate originated as a London County Council cottage estate constructed between 1901 and 1920 at Norbury in what is now the north of the London Borough of Croydon. It was declared a conservation area in 2008.

The site was a former brickfield, and the clay recovered was fired to make bricks for this estate and Totterdown Fields.

The estate was influenced by Ebenezer Howard's Garden city movement and the Arts and Crafts movement, with high quality external detailing and an open setting with privet hedges, front gardens and wide grass verges.

== Design ==
LCC cottage estates 1918–1939
Estate name	Area	No of dwellings	Population 1938	Population density
Pre-1914
Norbury	11	218	867	19.8 per acre (49/ha)
Old Oak	32	736	3519	23 per acre (57/ha)
Totterdown Fields	39	1262	—	32.4 per acre (80/ha)
Tower Gardens; White Hart Lane	98	783	5936	8 per acre (20/ha)
1919–1923
Becontree	2770	25769 (Note: Source says 2589 – transcription error)	115652	9.3 per acre (23/ha)
Bellingham	252	2673	12004	10.6 per acre (26/ha)
Castelnau	51	644	2851	12.6 per acre (31/ha)
Dover House Estate; Roehampton Estate	147	1212	5383	8.2 per acre (20/ha)
1924–1933
Downham	600	7096	30032	11.8 per acre (29/ha)
Mottingham	202	2337	9009	11.6 per acre (29/ha)
St Helier	825	9068	39877	11 per acre (27/ha)
Watling	386	4034	19110	10.5 per acre (26/ha)
Wormholt	68	783	4078	11.5 per acre (28/ha)
1934–1939
Chingford (Note: Part of a larger PRC estate around Huntsman Road)	217	1540	—	7.1 per acre (18/ha)
Hanwell (Ealing)	140	1587	6732	11.3 per acre (28/ha)
Headstone Lane	142	n.a	5000	
Kenmore Park	58	654	2078	11.3 per acre (28/ha)
Thornhill (Royal Borough of Greenwich)	21	380	1598	18.1 per acre (45/ha)
Whitefoot Lane (Downham)	49	n.a	n.a.	
Source: Yelling, J. A. (1995). "Banishing London's slums: The interwar cottage estates" (PDF). Transactions. 46. London and Middlesex Archeological Society: 167–173. Quotes: Rubinstein, 1991, Just like the country.

== Location ==
The estate is in the London Borough of Croydon, just west of the A23 and south of Norbury Station. It is bounded by Palmers Road, Darcy Road, Northborough Road and Tylecroft Road.

== See also ==
Old Oak and Wormholt
