= Bellingham, London =

Coordinates: 51.4311°N 0.0245°W

Bellingham
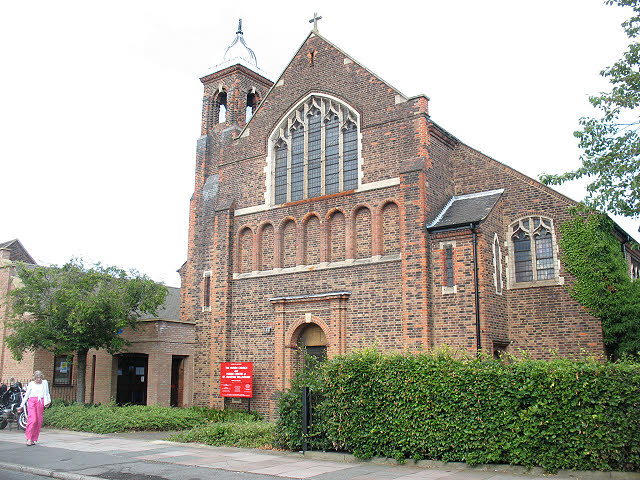
- St Dunstan's Church, Bellingham

- Location within Greater London
- Population: 14,775 (2011 Census. Ward)
- OS grid reference: TQ375715
- London borough: Lewisham
- Ceremonial county: Greater London
- Region: London
- Country: England
- Sovereign state: United Kingdom
- Post town: LONDON
- Postcode district: SE6
- Dialling code: 020
- Police: Metropolitan
- Fire: London
- Ambulance: London
- UK Parliament: Lewisham East
- London Assembly: Greenwich and Lewisham

Bellingham (/ˈbɛlɪŋəm/ BEL-ing-əm) is an area of south-east London, England, within the London Borough of Lewisham. It lies south of Catford, east of Sydenham and north of Beckenham, and is part of the Catford postal district (SE6).

== History ==
LCC cottage estates 1918–1939
Estate name	Area	No of dwellings	Population 1938	Population density
Pre-1914
Norbury	11	218	867	19.8 per acre (49/ha)
Old Oak	32	736	3519	23 per acre (57/ha)
Totterdown Fields	39	1262	—	32.4 per acre (80/ha)
Tower Gardens; White Hart Lane	98	783	5936	8 per acre (20/ha)
1919–1923
Becontree	2770	25769 (Note: Source says 2589 – transcription error)	115652	9.3 per acre (23/ha)
Bellingham	252	2673	12004	10.6 per acre (26/ha)
Castelnau	51	644	2851	12.6 per acre (31/ha)
Dover House Estate; Roehampton Estate	147	1212	5383	8.2 per acre (20/ha)
1924–1933
Downham	600	7096	30032	11.8 per acre (29/ha)
Mottingham	202	2337	9009	11.6 per acre (29/ha)
St Helier	825	9068	39877	11 per acre (27/ha)
Watling	386	4034	19110	10.5 per acre (26/ha)
Wormholt	68	783	4078	11.5 per acre (28/ha)
1934–1939
Chingford (Note: Part of a larger PRC estate around Huntsman Road)	217	1540	—	7.1 per acre (18/ha)
Hanwell (Ealing)	140	1587	6732	11.3 per acre (28/ha)
Headstone Lane	142	n.a	5000	
Kenmore Park	58	654	2078	11.3 per acre (28/ha)
Thornhill (Royal Borough of Greenwich)	21	380	1598	18.1 per acre (45/ha)
Whitefoot Lane (Downham)	49	n.a	n.a.	
Source: Yelling, J. A. (1995). "Banishing London's slums: The interwar cottage estates" (PDF). Transactions. 46. London and Middlesex Archeological Society: 167–173. Quotes: Rubinstein, 1991, Just like the country.

According to author and historian Nick Barratt, there was certainly a Saxon community at Bellingham. In 10th-century Anglo-Saxon charters, the place is referred to as Beringaham and by 1198 the name had changed from starting with 'Ber' to 'Bel' through Norman influence. Some streets in Bellingham are named after the Saxon king Alfred the Great and his extended family: King Alfred Avenue, Elfrida Crescent and Arnulf Street.

The area was farmland for centuries, but a railway station was opened in 1892 which initiated development of the area. The London County Council developed a cottage estate from 1919 to 1923 on the former Bellingham Farm, west of the railway station with additional development before World War II. It is now bordered to the east and west by railway lines and by Southend Lane, the A2218, to the south. The River Ravensbourne runs through Bellingham, although it is either underground or part of a man-made section of the river. The Greenwich Prime Meridian passes to the east of Bellingham.

The area to the east of the A21 was largely privately developed in the 1930's on land rising from the Ravensbourne flood plain, also benefitting from proximity to the railway station

== Amenities ==
Randlesdown Road serves as a mini 'High Street' for Bellingham providing a local supermarket, a range of shops, the Fellowship pub and cinema, various takeaways and a leisure centre (situated on Bellingham playing fields). It is known for being a very multicultural area.

Bellingham Green is a hexagonal public park at the centre of the estate.

== Transport ==
Bellingham railway station serves the area with services to Kentish Town (London Blackfriars off peak) via Catford and to Sevenoaks via Swanley. Catford Bus Garage is on the A21 in Bellingham, and is served by many Transport for London buses connecting it with areas including Beckenham, Biggin Hill, Bromley, Catford, Central London, Greenwich, Shoreditch, Camberwell, Bermondsey, Deptford, Elephant & Castle, Brockley, Lewisham, New Cross, Orpington, Peckham and Woolwich. Heritage Bus rallies are occasionally centred on the bus garage.

== Pre-school and primary education ==
Pre-schools, nurseries and kindergartens include Kindergarten Forest Hill in Bellingham Green and Umbrella House Day Nursery. Primary schools in Bellingham include Athelney Primary School, St Augustines and Elfrida Primary School.

== Notable Buildings ==
The Fellowship Public House, built in 1923-24, adjoins the railway station and serves the Bellingham estate. It is Grade II listed. Further to the south, on the east side of the A21, is the Passfields Estate, a local authority estate designed by Fry, Drew & Partners and built in 1949-51 which is also Grade II listed. The former Excalibur Estate to the east of Bellingham had until recently been the largest estate of its type, being temporary or "prefab" housing built towards the end of the Second World War as emergency housing for displaced residents. The majority of the estate was demolished for redevelopment in 2023-2025 but six houses will be retained and Grade II listed.

== Image gallery ==
Bellingham Estate, London Borough of Lewisham
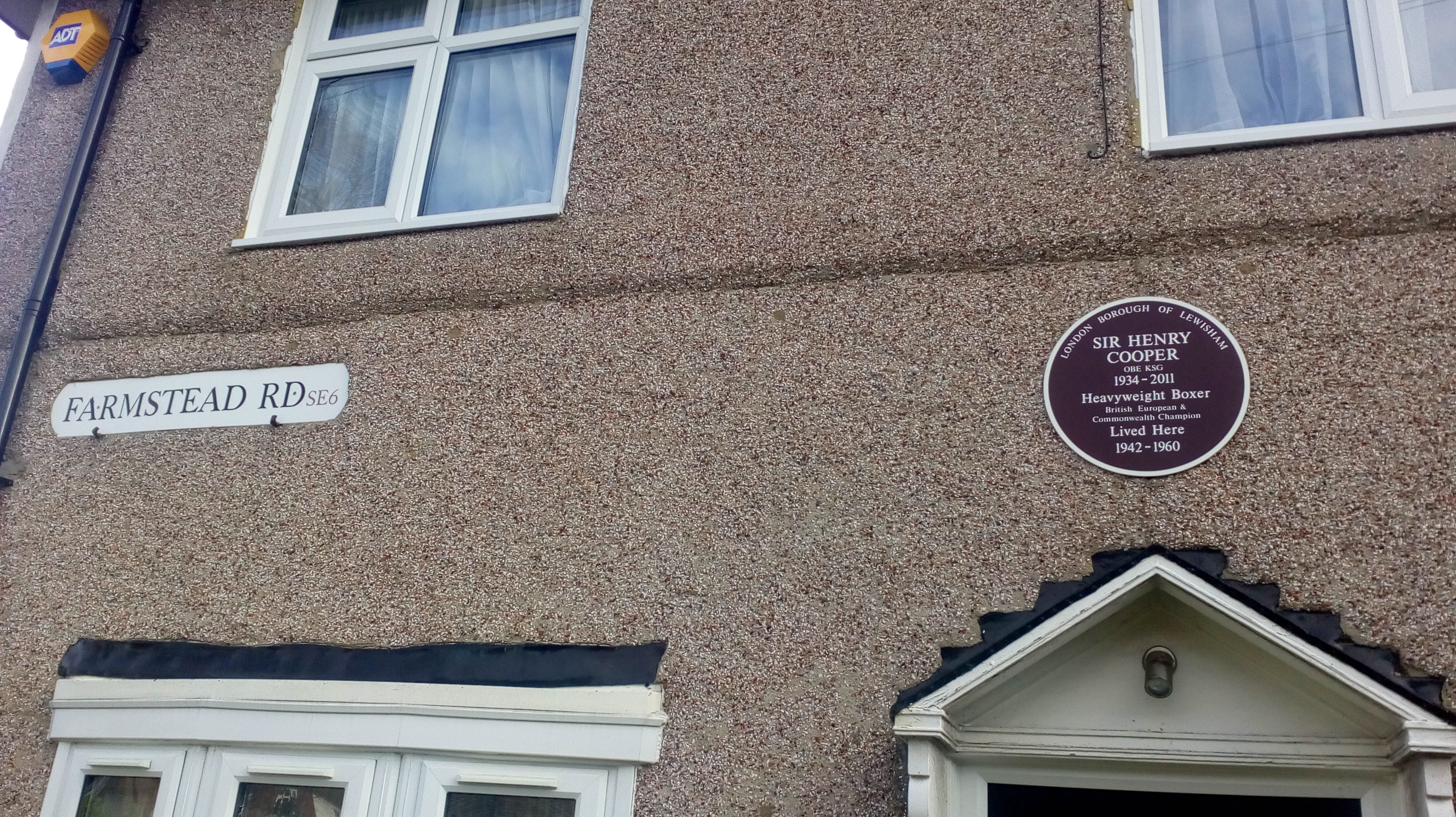
Plaque showing former home of heavyweight boxing champion Henry Cooper at 120 Farmstead Road, Bellingham

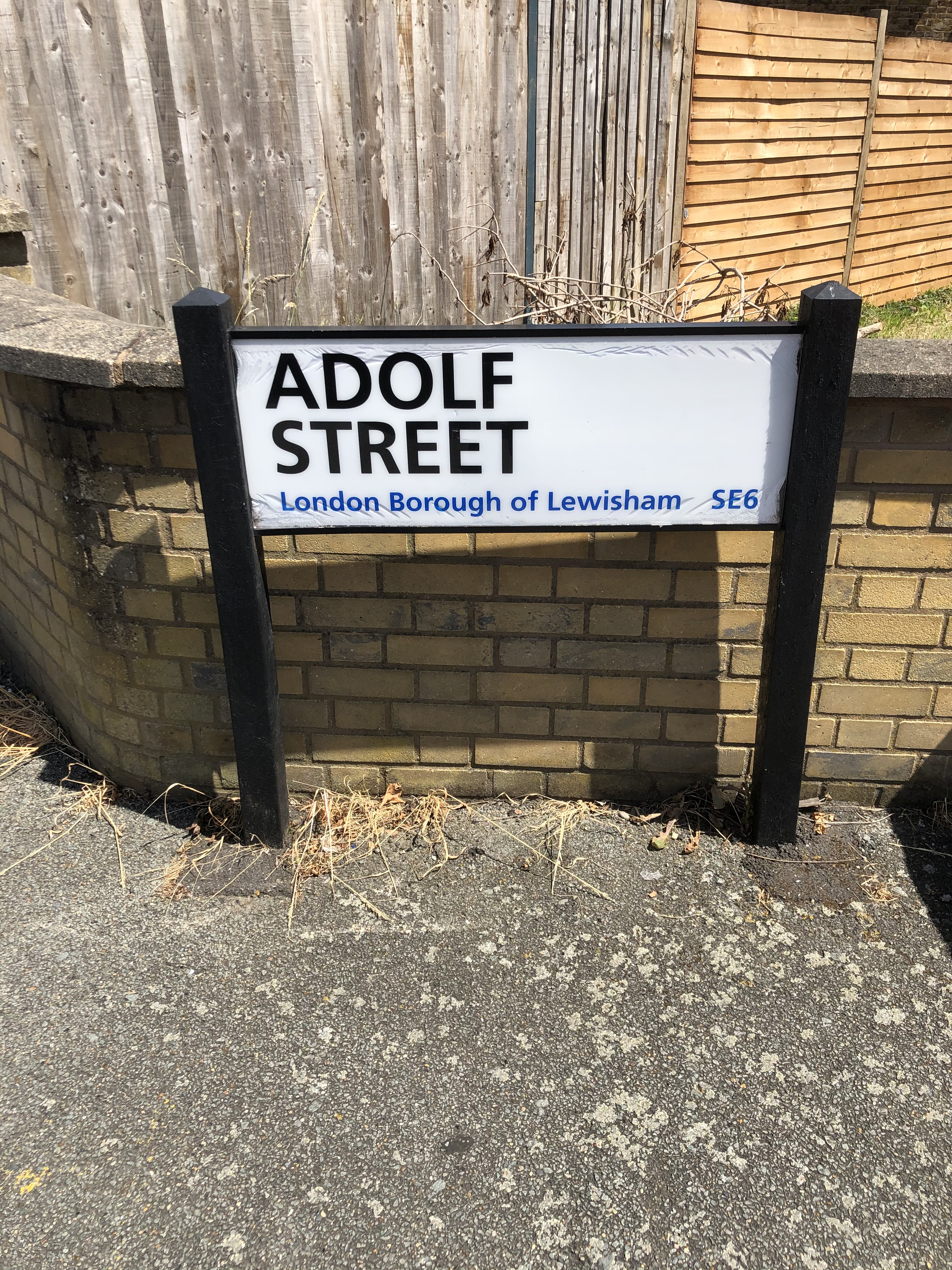
Adolf Street in the Bellingham Estate
