= Totterdown Fields =

Housing estate in London

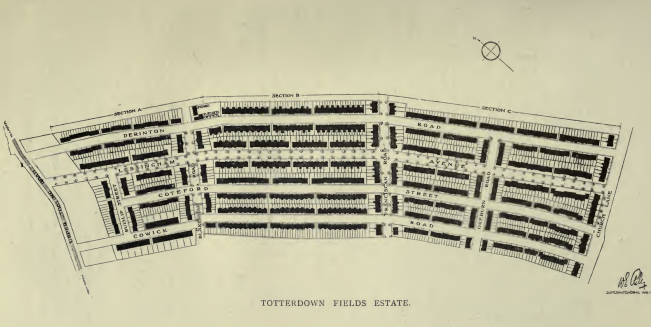
- 1913 plan of the estate
- Interactive map of Totterdown Fields

General information
- Location: Wandsworth, London
- Coordinates: 51.4370°N 0.1626°W
- Status: conservation area (19 September 1978)
- Area: 38 acres (15 ha)
- No. of units: 1244 houses

Construction
- Constructed: 1901 to 1911
- Authority: London County Council
- Style: Cottage Estate
- Influence: Garden city movement, Arts and Crafts movement

Other information
- Governing body: Wandsworth Conservation & Design Group

Totterdown Fields was the first London County Council cottage estate built between 1901 and 1911 It contained 1244 individual houses built over 38 acres (15 ha). The estate was designated a conservation area, on 19 September 1978.

== Context ==
LCC cottage estates 1918–1939
Estate name	Area	No of dwellings	Population 1938	Population density
Pre-1914
Norbury	11	218	867	19.8 per acre (49/ha)
Old Oak	32	736	3519	23 per acre (57/ha)
Totterdown Fields	39	1262	—	32.4 per acre (80/ha)
Tower Gardens; White Hart Lane	98	783	5936	8 per acre (20/ha)
1919–1923
Becontree	2770	25769 (Note: Source says 2589 – transcription error)	115652	9.3 per acre (23/ha)
Bellingham	252	2673	12004	10.6 per acre (26/ha)
Castelnau	51	644	2851	12.6 per acre (31/ha)
Dover House Estate; Roehampton Estate	147	1212	5383	8.2 per acre (20/ha)
1924–1933
Downham	600	7096	30032	11.8 per acre (29/ha)
Mottingham	202	2337	9009	11.6 per acre (29/ha)
St Helier	825	9068	39877	11 per acre (27/ha)
Watling	386	4034	19110	10.5 per acre (26/ha)
Wormholt	68	783	4078	11.5 per acre (28/ha)
1934–1939
Chingford (Note: Part of a larger PRC estate around Huntsman Road)	217	1540	—	7.1 per acre (18/ha)
Hanwell (Ealing)	140	1587	6732	11.3 per acre (28/ha)
Headstone Lane	142	n.a	5000	
Kenmore Park	58	654	2078	11.3 per acre (28/ha)
Thornhill (Royal Borough of Greenwich)	21	380	1598	18.1 per acre (45/ha)
Whitefoot Lane (Downham)	49	n.a	n.a.	
Source: Yelling, J. A. (1995). "Banishing London's slums: The interwar cottage estates" (PDF). Transactions. 46. London and Middlesex Archeological Society: 167–173. Quotes: Rubinstein, 1991, Just like the country.

It was the first London County Council cottage estate built between 1901 and 1911 in Wandsworth. The estate contains 1,244 individual houses built over 38 acres (15 ha). It was influenced by Ebenezer Howard's Garden city movement and the Arts and Crafts movement. The principal architect was Ernest Stone Collins.

== Gallery ==
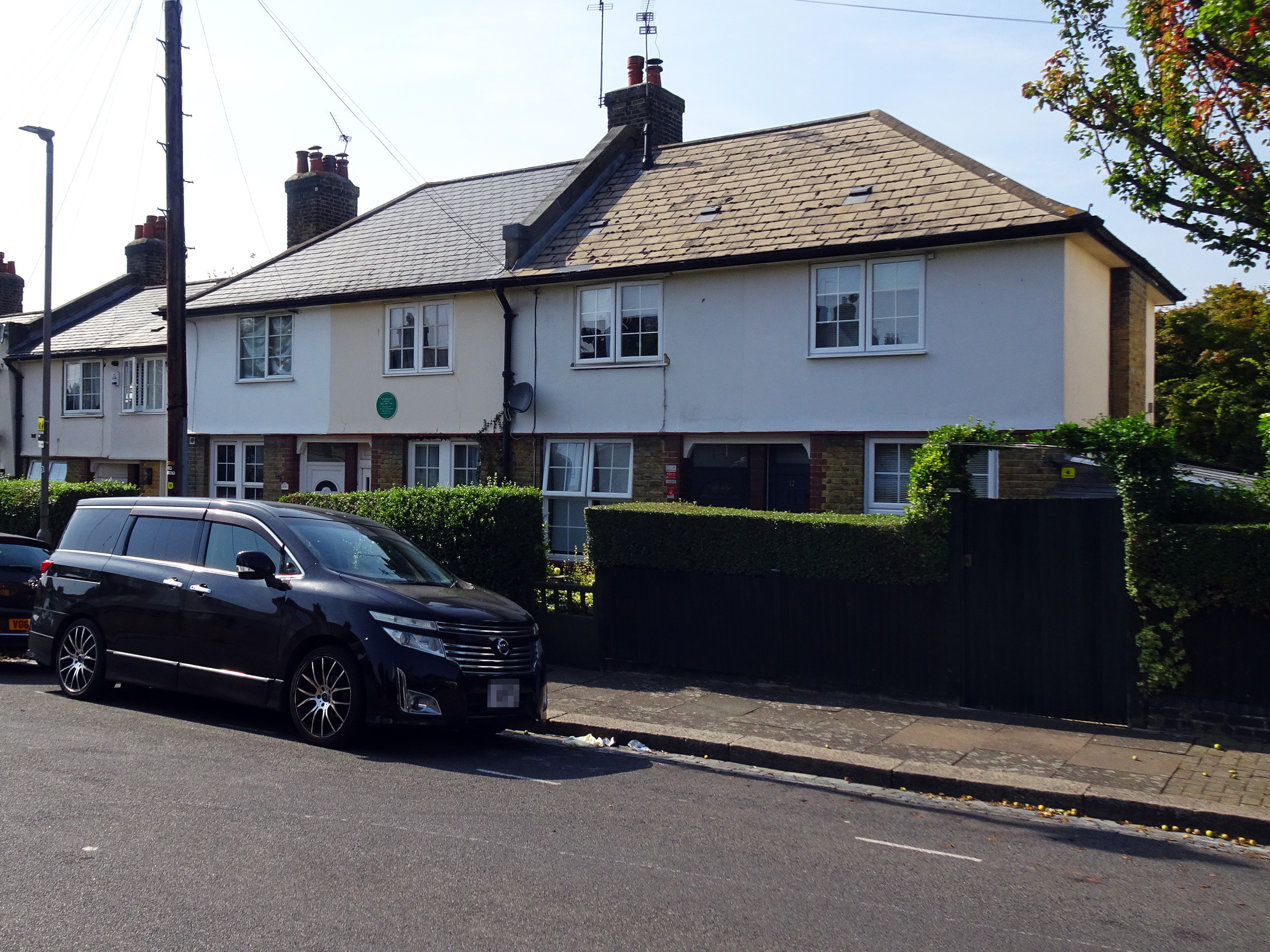
A terrace of four houses in Ruislip Street

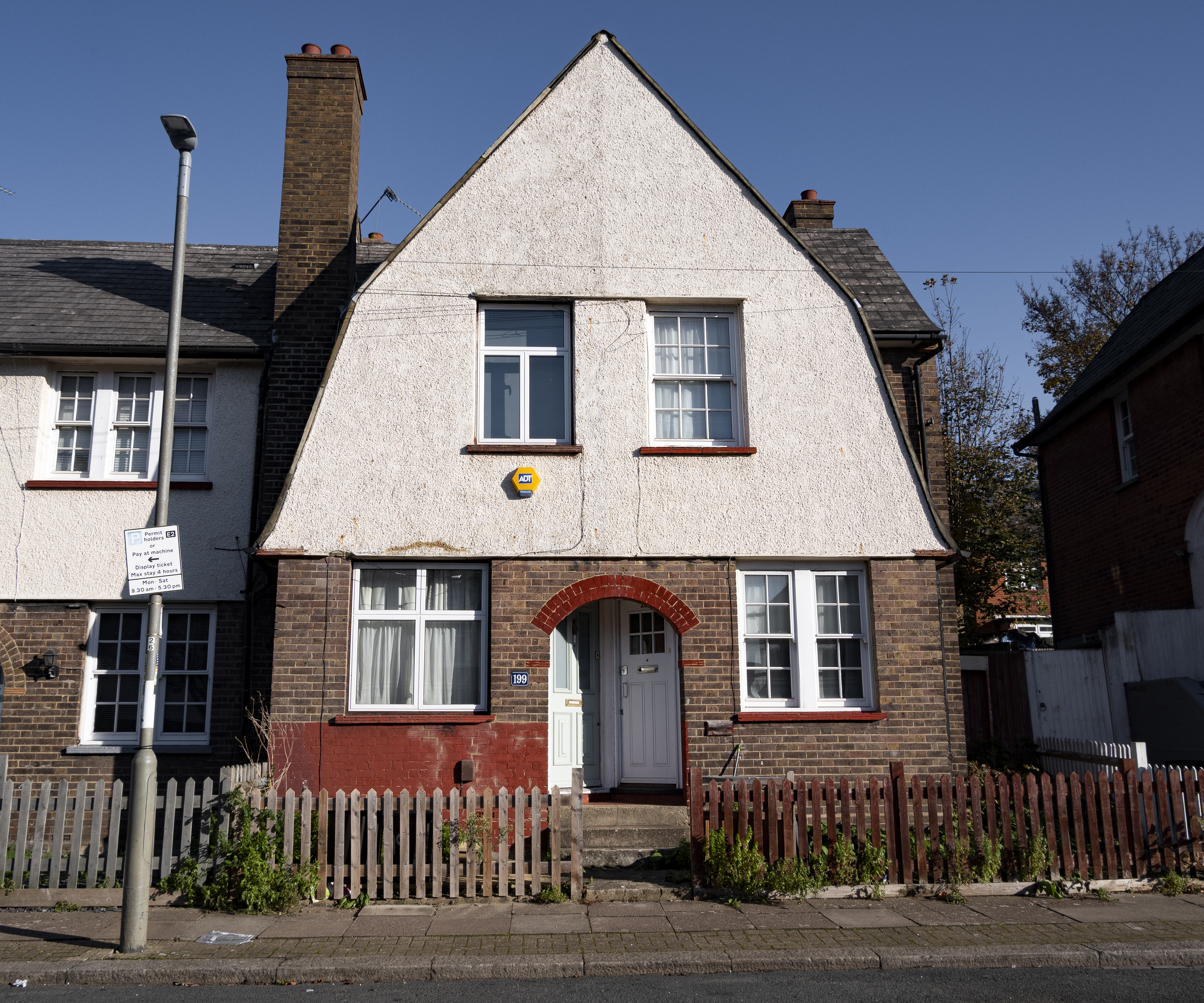
Two semi-detached houses in Lessingham Avenue

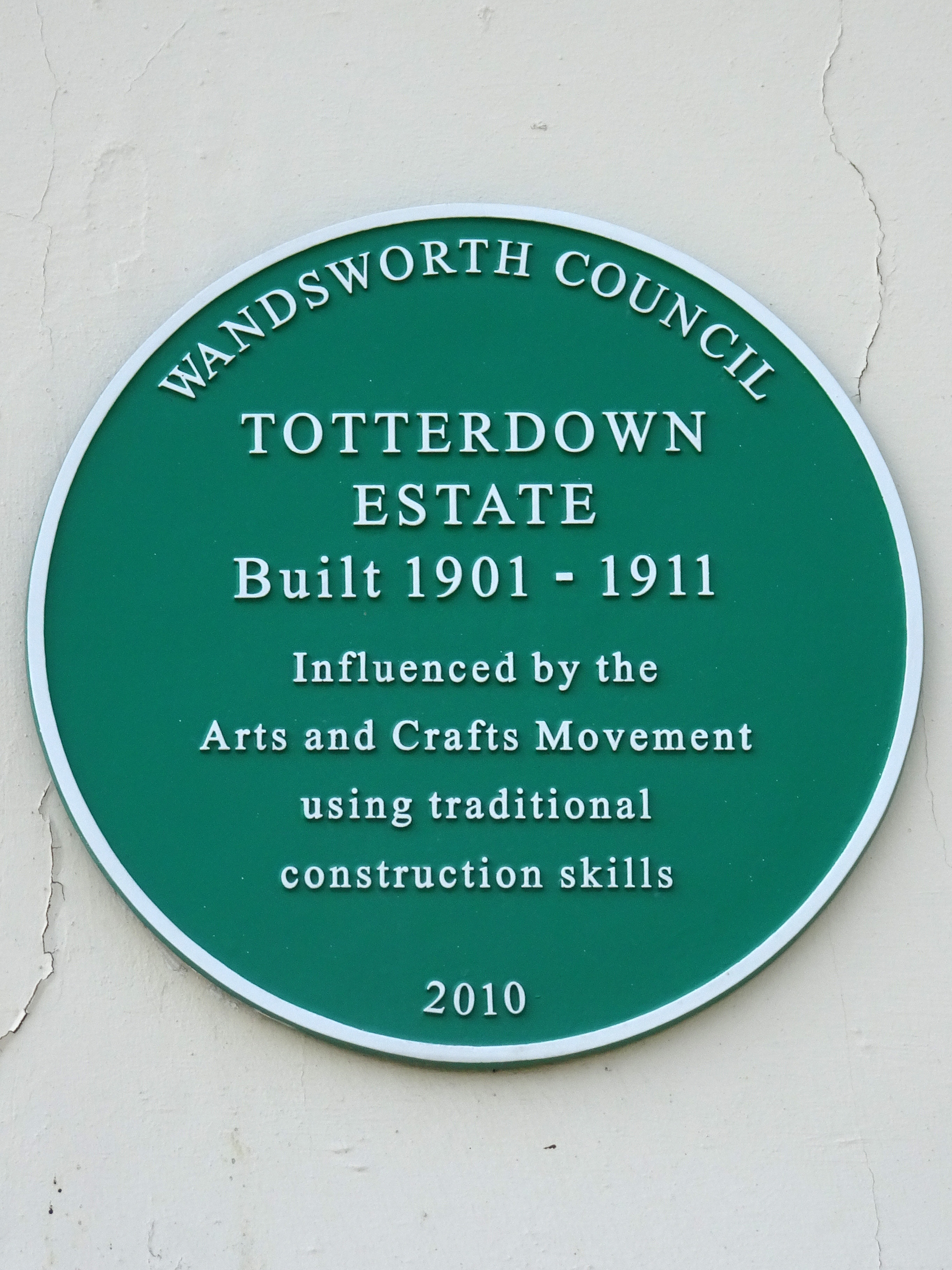
Plaque in Ruislip Street

== See also ==
- Boundary Estate
