= Old Oak and Wormholt =

Housing estates in London

Coordinates: 51.5129°N 0.2412°W

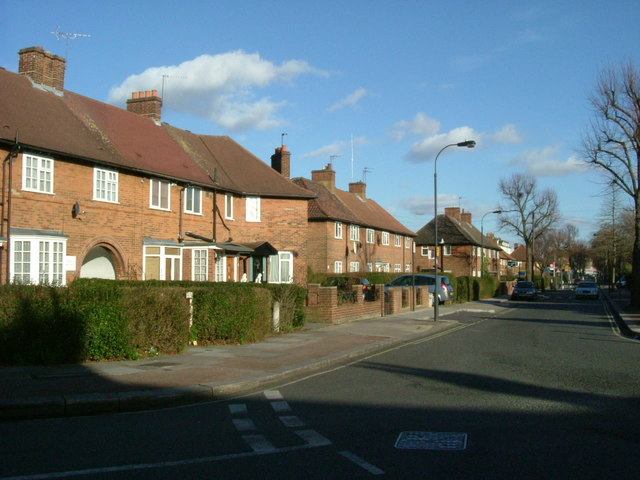
Bryony Road on the Wormholt Estate

The Old Oak and Wormholt estates are London County Council cottage estates constructed between 1912 and 1928. They were declared a conservation area in May 1980. The two estates were influenced by Ebenezer Howard's Garden city movement and the Arts and Crafts movement, with high quality external detailing and an open setting with privet hedges, front gardens and wide grass verges.

== Location ==
The estates are in the London Borough of Hammersmith and Fulham, in the west of London, lying either side of the A40 Westway to the south of Wormwood Scrubs. To the west they are bounded by Old Oak Road and to the east partially by Bloemfontain Road. The southern boundary extends to include Wormholt Park. The London Underground Central line passes through the estates. The station is called East Acton tube station.

== History ==
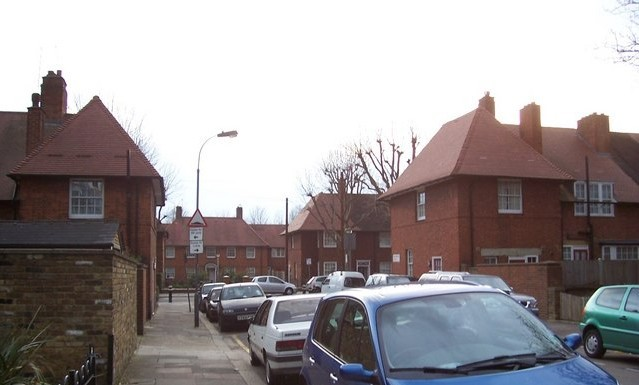
Braybrook Street on the Old Oak Estate

London County Council bought the 54 acres (22 ha) from the Ecclesiastical Commissioners in 1905, 5 acres (2.0 ha) were resold to the Great Western Railway for the Ealing to Shepherds Bush branch line. The Old Oak estate was built in two phases: west of East Acton station and the railway in 1912–13, and east in 1920–23. The final fourteen houses were added in 1927.

The land for the Wormholt Estate was purchased from the same source in 1919. In 1926–28 LCC built 783 houses and Hammersmith Council added 500 houses on the adjoining 76 acres (31 ha). Plans for 37 shops were dropped but the Hammersmith Open Air Swimming Pool and Wormholt Park were both constructed.

The estates were designated conservation areas in May 1940. An Article 4 Direction, taking away certain PD Rights (permitted development rights) to preserve aspects of the character of the estate, has been issued.

== Design ==
LCC cottage estates 1918–1939
Estate name	Area	No of dwellings	Population 1938	Population density
Pre-1914
Norbury	11	218	867	19.8 per acre (49/ha)
Old Oak	32	736	3519	23 per acre (57/ha)
Totterdown Fields	39	1262	—	32.4 per acre (80/ha)
Tower Gardens; White Hart Lane	98	783	5936	8 per acre (20/ha)
1919–1923
Becontree	2770	25769 (Note: Source says 2589 – transcription error)	115652	9.3 per acre (23/ha)
Bellingham	252	2673	12004	10.6 per acre (26/ha)
Castelnau	51	644	2851	12.6 per acre (31/ha)
Dover House Estate; Roehampton Estate	147	1212	5383	8.2 per acre (20/ha)
1924–1933
Downham	600	7096	30032	11.8 per acre (29/ha)
Mottingham	202	2337	9009	11.6 per acre (29/ha)
St Helier	825	9068	39877	11 per acre (27/ha)
Watling	386	4034	19110	10.5 per acre (26/ha)
Wormholt	68	783	4078	11.5 per acre (28/ha)
1934–1939
Chingford (Note: Part of a larger PRC estate around Huntsman Road)	217	1540	—	7.1 per acre (18/ha)
Hanwell (Ealing)	140	1587	6732	11.3 per acre (28/ha)
Headstone Lane	142	n.a	5000	
Kenmore Park	58	654	2078	11.3 per acre (28/ha)
Thornhill (Royal Borough of Greenwich)	21	380	1598	18.1 per acre (45/ha)
Whitefoot Lane (Downham)	49	n.a	n.a.	
Source: Yelling, J. A. (1995). "Banishing London's slums: The interwar cottage estates" (PDF). Transactions. 46. London and Middlesex Archeological Society: 167–173. Quotes: Rubinstein, 1991, Just like the country.

The estate was designed by the LCC's Architects' Department Housing of the Working Classes branch, particularly A S Soutar, F J Lucas, and J M Corment, using Hampstead Garden Suburb as a reference. The Hampstead Garden Suburb Act 1906 had freed Raymond Unwin, the architect, from the gridiron street pattern imposed by the Public Health Act 1875, and this had been extended to all estates by the Town Planning Act 1909.

As planned the estate was to contain 1527 houses, referred to as cottages, built at a density of 27 per acre (67/ha). The first 304 cottages and five shops were finished January 1914, and the drainage and sewers laid for the rest when the war halted construction.

The cottages were built in small terraces from red brick. They shared a common style but were deliberately different from each other. The Arts and Crafts style was applied to the roofing; which predominantly was red tiles but from different sources to vary the texture. Some roofs used a hand made Belgian peg tile which is very difficult to match when repairs are needed.

The Conservation Areas Design guidelines explain that "privet hedging, grass verges, street trees and the provision of small cottage gardens" and "the widespread use of wooden mullioned window frames (both sash and casement), brick façades, pitched and gabled roofs, small dormers and panelled doors reinforce the cottage character of the estates".

=== Article 4 Direction ===
There is requirement to obtain planning consent for proposed changes to:

1. Roofs – form or materials
2. Facades – Painting, rendering or cladding – removal or changes to the string courses or arches
3. Existing rendering – any change of colour
4. Proposed hardstanding for vehicles
5. Porches
6. Gates, Walls and hedges
7. Extension
8. Windows – form, colour or material
9. Doorways

The presumption is always against change.

Trees are protected.

== See also ==
Totterdown Fields
