= Castelnau, London =

Road in London, England

Coordinates: 51.486°N 0.233°W

Castelnau
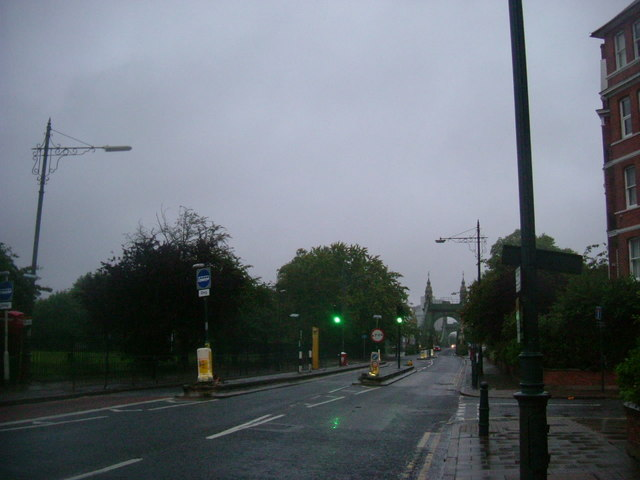
- Castelnau, approaching Hammersmith Bridge

- Location within Greater London
- OS grid reference: TQ226776
- London borough: Richmond
- Ceremonial county: Greater London
- Region: London
- Country: England
- Sovereign state: United Kingdom
- Post town: LONDON
- Postcode district: SW13
- Dialling code: 020
- Police: Metropolitan
- Fire: London
- Ambulance: London
- UK Parliament: Richmond Park
- London Assembly: South West

Castelnau (/ˈkɑːsəlnaʊ/) is a road in Barnes, in the London Borough of Richmond upon Thames, southwest London, approximately 5.1 miles (8.2 km) west from Charing Cross on the south side of the River Thames.

About 1.1 miles (1.8 km) long, it is the main road south from Hammersmith Bridge and forms part of the A306 road. It was originally named Upper Bridge Road. The name Castelnau is also used informally for Castelnau Estate and the area surrounding the road. It joins Church Road at is southern end, which then runs westwards beside Barnes Green until it meets Barnes High Street.

An area of Barnes including Castelnau was designated a conservation area in 1977.

== Etymology ==
Castelnau takes its name from Castelnau-Valence, near Nîmes in France: in 1691, the 10th Baron of Castelnau and St Croix, a Huguenot, fled France for England following persecution, and his son, Charles Boileau, settled in north Barnes and his descendants developed parts of the area. Maurice Boileau, the other son of the 10th Baron, stayed in the Castle and his descendants still live in the castle.

Castelnau means "new castle" in the Occitan language.

== History ==
Castelnau was developed after the opening of Hammersmith Bridge in 1827. Major Charles Lestock Boileau built Castelnau Villas (now 84–122 and 91–125 Castelnau), designed by the architect William Laxton, in 1842, followed by rows of cottages called Castelnau Row, Castelnau Place and Gothic Cottages. After his death in 1889, Upper Bridge Road was renamed Castelnau.

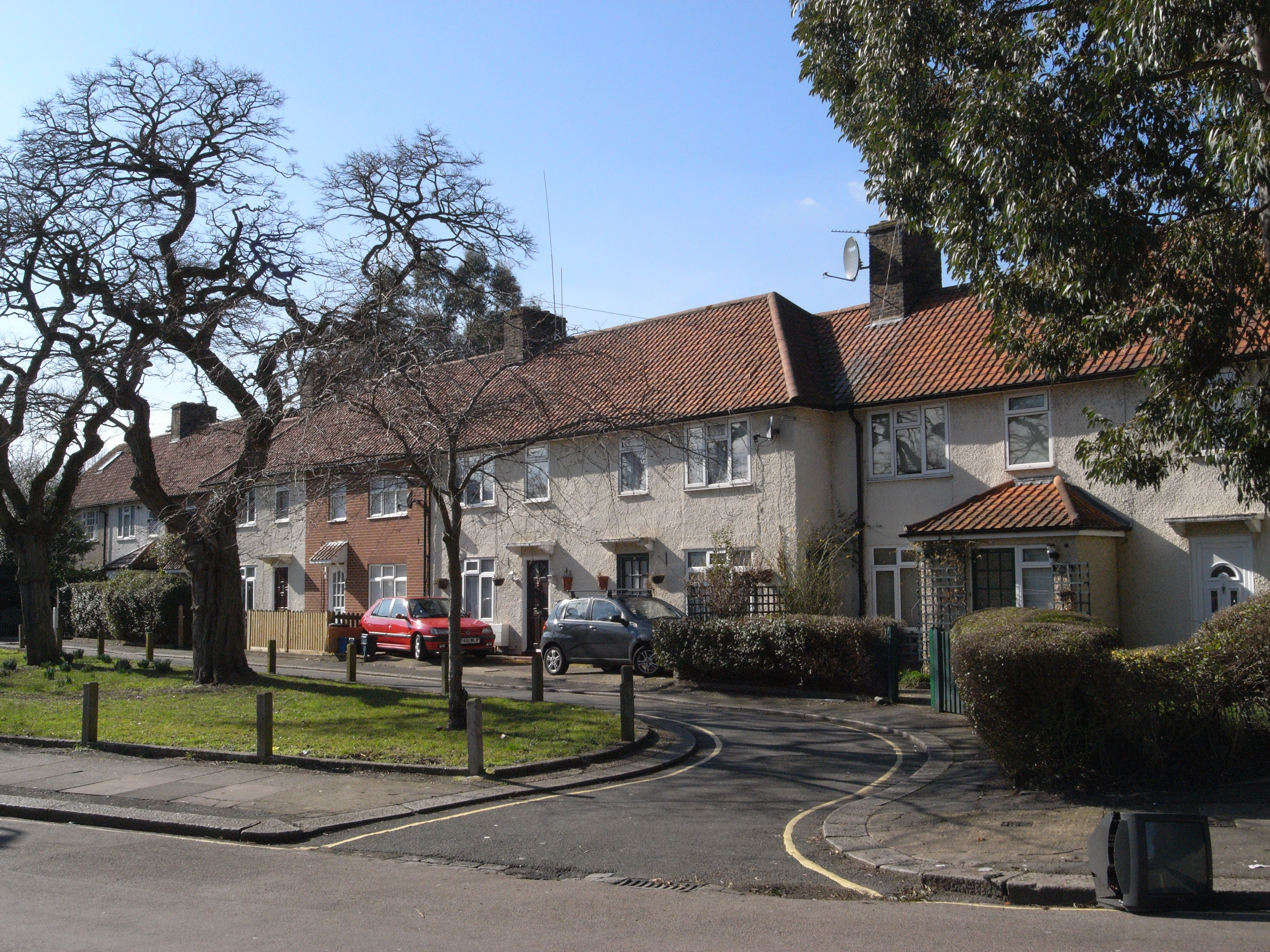
Castelnau Estate, Barnes

=== Castelnau Estate ===
LCC cottage estates 1918–1939
Estate name	Area	No of dwellings	Population 1938	Population density
Pre-1914
Norbury	11	218	867	19.8 per acre (49/ha)
Old Oak	32	736	3519	23 per acre (57/ha)
Totterdown Fields	39	1262	—	32.4 per acre (80/ha)
Tower Gardens; White Hart Lane	98	783	5936	8 per acre (20/ha)
1919–1923
Becontree	2770	25769 (Note: Source says 2589 – transcription error)	115652	9.3 per acre (23/ha)
Bellingham	252	2673	12004	10.6 per acre (26/ha)
Castelnau	51	644	2851	12.6 per acre (31/ha)
Dover House Estate; Roehampton Estate	147	1212	5383	8.2 per acre (20/ha)
1924–1933
Downham	600	7096	30032	11.8 per acre (29/ha)
Mottingham	202	2337	9009	11.6 per acre (29/ha)
St Helier	825	9068	39877	11 per acre (27/ha)
Watling	386	4034	19110	10.5 per acre (26/ha)
Wormholt	68	783	4078	11.5 per acre (28/ha)
1934–1939
Chingford (Note: Part of a larger PRC estate around Huntsman Road)	217	1540	—	7.1 per acre (18/ha)
Hanwell (Ealing)	140	1587	6732	11.3 per acre (28/ha)
Headstone Lane	142	n.a	5000	
Kenmore Park	58	654	2078	11.3 per acre (28/ha)
Thornhill (Royal Borough of Greenwich)	21	380	1598	18.1 per acre (45/ha)
Whitefoot Lane (Downham)	49	n.a	n.a.	
Source: Yelling, J. A. (1995). "Banishing London's slums: The interwar cottage estates" (PDF). Transactions. 46. London and Middlesex Archeological Society: 167–173. Quotes: Rubinstein, 1991, Just like the country.

In 1926, London County Council built a cottage estate of 640 houses, called Castelnau Estate, on the site of a market garden. In 1971 these passed to ownership of Richmond upon Thames Council. Many are now privately owned. Many of the roads in this estate are named after Deans of St. Paul's who had been Lords of the manor of Barnes between the 14th and 17th centuries: Everdon, Kilmington, Alderbury, Kentwode, Howsman and Stillingfleet.

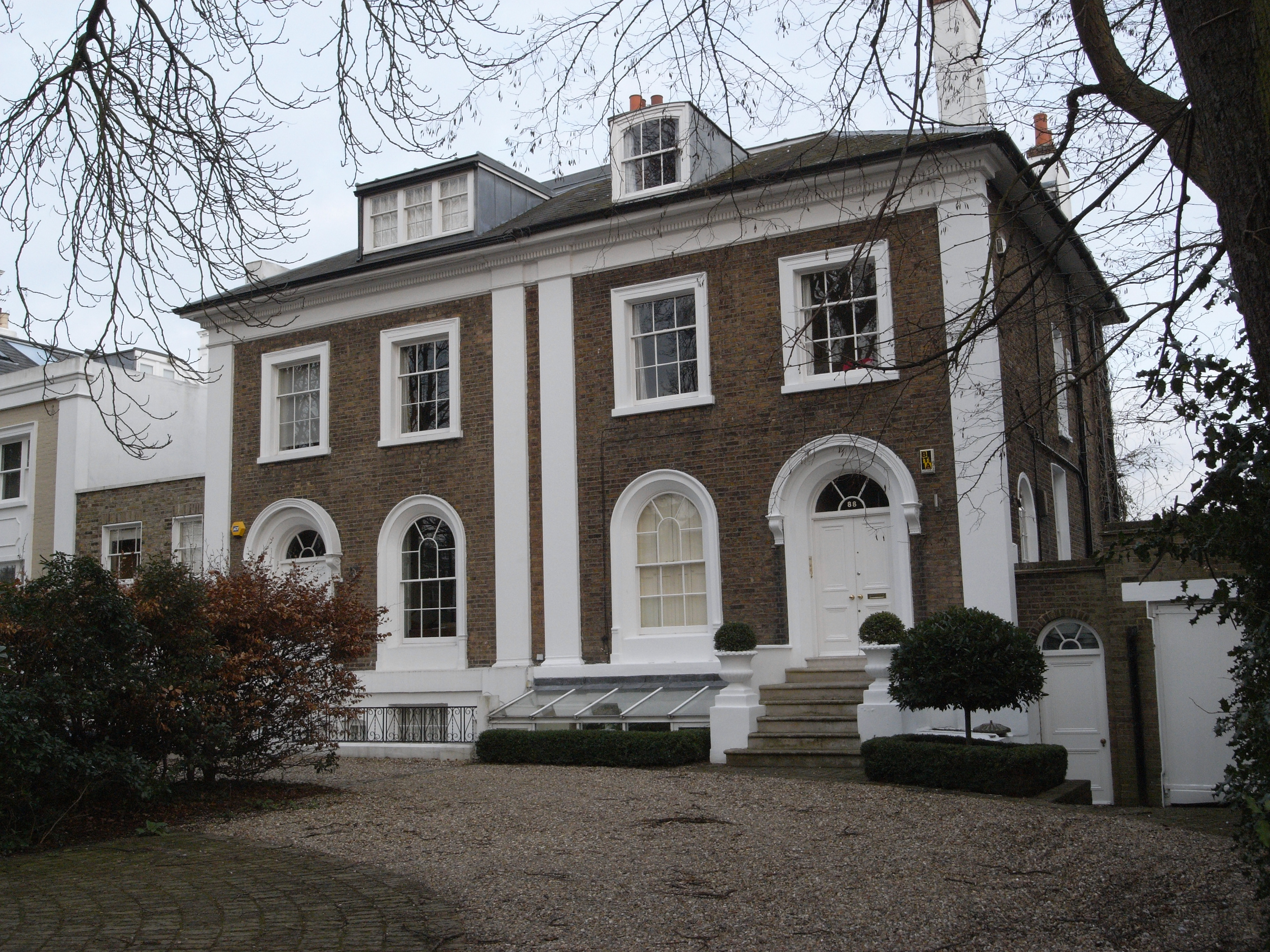
Classical housing in Castelnau

== Notable buildings ==
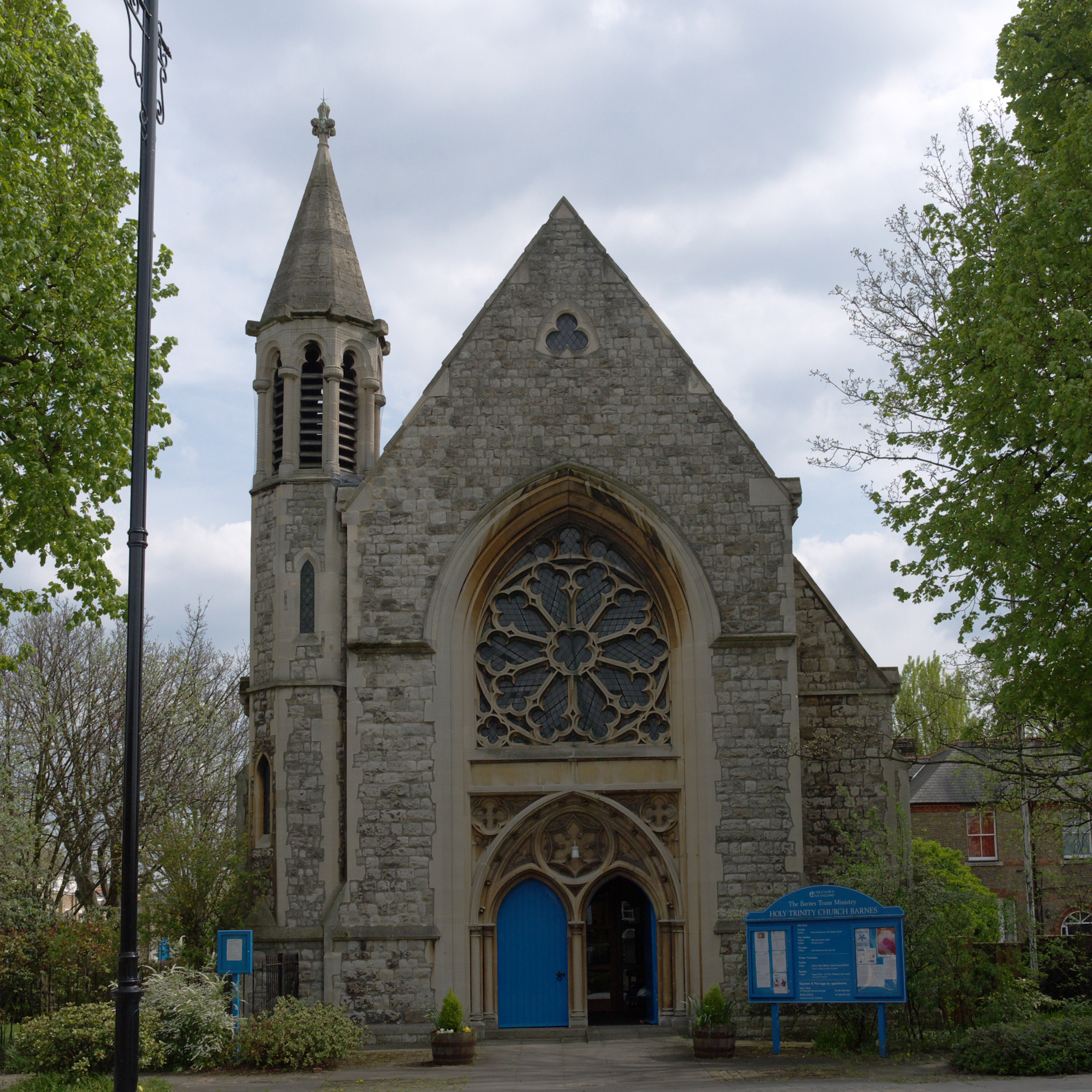
Holy Trinity Church Barnes

Castelnau is noted for 20 pairs of exceptional classical villas, 91-125 Castelnau, which were built in 1842 by Major Boileau (see above) and are Grade II listed.

There are also two churches:

- Holy Trinity Barnes
- Catholic Church of St Osmund, Barnes

From around the time of World War II to 1987, the art dealership Abbott and Holder operated a gallery in the house at 73 Castelnau, which was also the home of the founder, Robert Abbott.
