= Headstone, London =

Coordinates: 51.6013°N 0.36324°W

Headstone
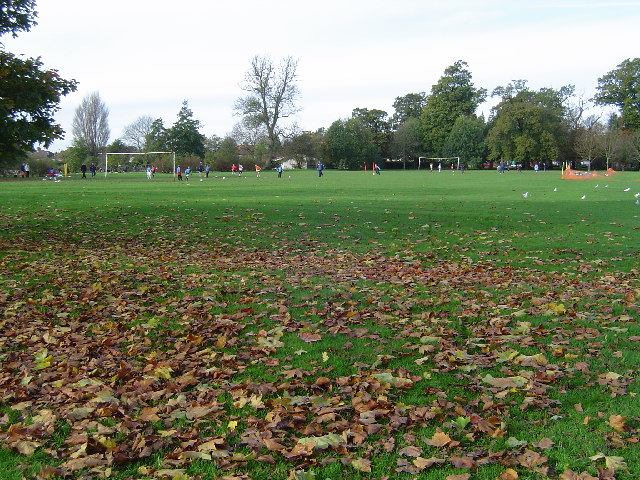
- Headstone Manor Recreation Ground in autumn

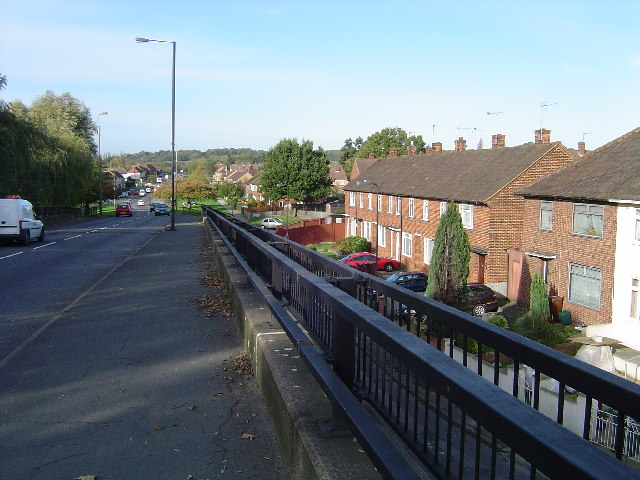
- Courtenay Avenue; Average housing stock in Headstone; Harrow Weald Common is in the background

- Location within Greater London
- Population: 21,228 (2011 Census. Headstone North and South Wards)
- OS grid reference: TQ138907
- London borough: Harrow
- Ceremonial county: Greater London
- Region: London
- Country: England
- Sovereign state: United Kingdom
- Post town: HARROW
- Postcode district: HA2, HA3
- Dialling code: 020
- Police: Metropolitan
- Fire: London
- Ambulance: London
- UK Parliament: Harrow West
- London Assembly: Brent and Harrow

Headstone is a residential area north-west of Harrow, London, and immediately north of North Harrow. (Note: North Harrow, like many London suburbs such as East Dulwich, is to the geographer a misnomer; however is north-west of the older Harrow-on-the-Hill and named after its station, which required a name; from Harrow-on-the-Hill there is a particularly straight road called The Ridgeway. It is thus centred west-northwest of Harrow.) A green buffer exists between Headstone and North Harrow that consists of a moated manor site (Headstone Manor) and football and rugby pitches, making the area mostly separate from North Harrow. However, there are some points of flux and overlap. To the west the area abuts the large and predominantly agricultural pasture of Pinner Park.

== History ==
Headstone Manor is fourteenth century with many later additions and renovations: it is a significant place of interest in its own right. The manor had an unrivalled status, see manorialism until after the Reformation and formation of the British Empire and to an extent, usually for such a site, relatively close to London, even until the Enlightenment which sparked the Industrial Revolution. This has led to the barns having remained largely intact to the present.

The origin of the place name may be related to that of Wealdstone, which is a neighbouring area situated directly north of Harrow being the residential part north of its midpoint train station, Harrow & Wealdstone – this area acts as a second tier commercial hub for the area, the main hub being the Harrow shopping precincts and centres closer to Harrow-on-the-Hill station just 0.5 miles (0.80 km) south of Harrow & Wealdstone.

== Politics ==
Headstone is part of the Harrow West constituency for elections to the House of Commons of the United Kingdom.

Headstone is part of the Headstone ward for elections to Harrow London Borough Council.

== Housing ==
LCC cottage estates 1918–1939
Estate name	Area	No of dwellings	Population 1938	Population density
Pre-1914
Norbury	11	218	867	19.8 per acre (49/ha)
Old Oak	32	736	3519	23 per acre (57/ha)
Totterdown Fields	39	1262	—	32.4 per acre (80/ha)
Tower Gardens; White Hart Lane	98	783	5936	8 per acre (20/ha)
1919–1923
Becontree	2770	25769 (Note: Source says 2589 – transcription error)	115652	9.3 per acre (23/ha)
Bellingham	252	2673	12004	10.6 per acre (26/ha)
Castelnau	51	644	2851	12.6 per acre (31/ha)
Dover House Estate; Roehampton Estate	147	1212	5383	8.2 per acre (20/ha)
1924–1933
Downham	600	7096	30032	11.8 per acre (29/ha)
Mottingham	202	2337	9009	11.6 per acre (29/ha)
St Helier	825	9068	39877	11 per acre (27/ha)
Watling	386	4034	19110	10.5 per acre (26/ha)
Wormholt	68	783	4078	11.5 per acre (28/ha)
1934–1939
Chingford (Note: Part of a larger PRC estate around Huntsman Road)	217	1540	—	7.1 per acre (18/ha)
Hanwell (Ealing)	140	1587	6732	11.3 per acre (28/ha)
Headstone Lane	142	n.a	5000	
Kenmore Park	58	654	2078	11.3 per acre (28/ha)
Thornhill (Royal Borough of Greenwich)	21	380	1598	18.1 per acre (45/ha)
Whitefoot Lane (Downham)	49	n.a	n.a.	
Source: Yelling, J. A. (1995). "Banishing London's slums: The interwar cottage estates" (PDF). Transactions. 46. London and Middlesex Archeological Society: 167–173. Quotes: Rubinstein, 1991, Just like the country.

There is a large LCC cottage estate built on 153 acres (62 ha) south of the Uxbridge road housing 5,000 people.

Headstone South is predominantly made up of 1930s semi-detached housing.

== Amenities ==
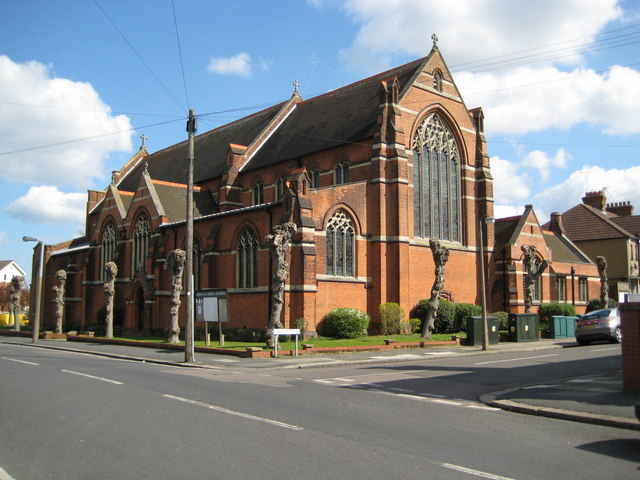
St George's Church, Headstone

Harrow Weald Common adjoins the northern border of the area, open for walking and mountain biking equally, this is on the northern boundary of Harrow Weald (marked by Uxbridge Road). On this common which rises steeply in the north to climb the hill of Weald Wood, towards the southwestern, Headstone, side is the Bannister Sports Centre, an athletics track and training ground.

Pinner Park features a miniature railway and a cricket ground with pavilion.

St George's Anglican parish church, serving the area, was built by John Samuel Alder and consecrated in 1911.

== Transport ==
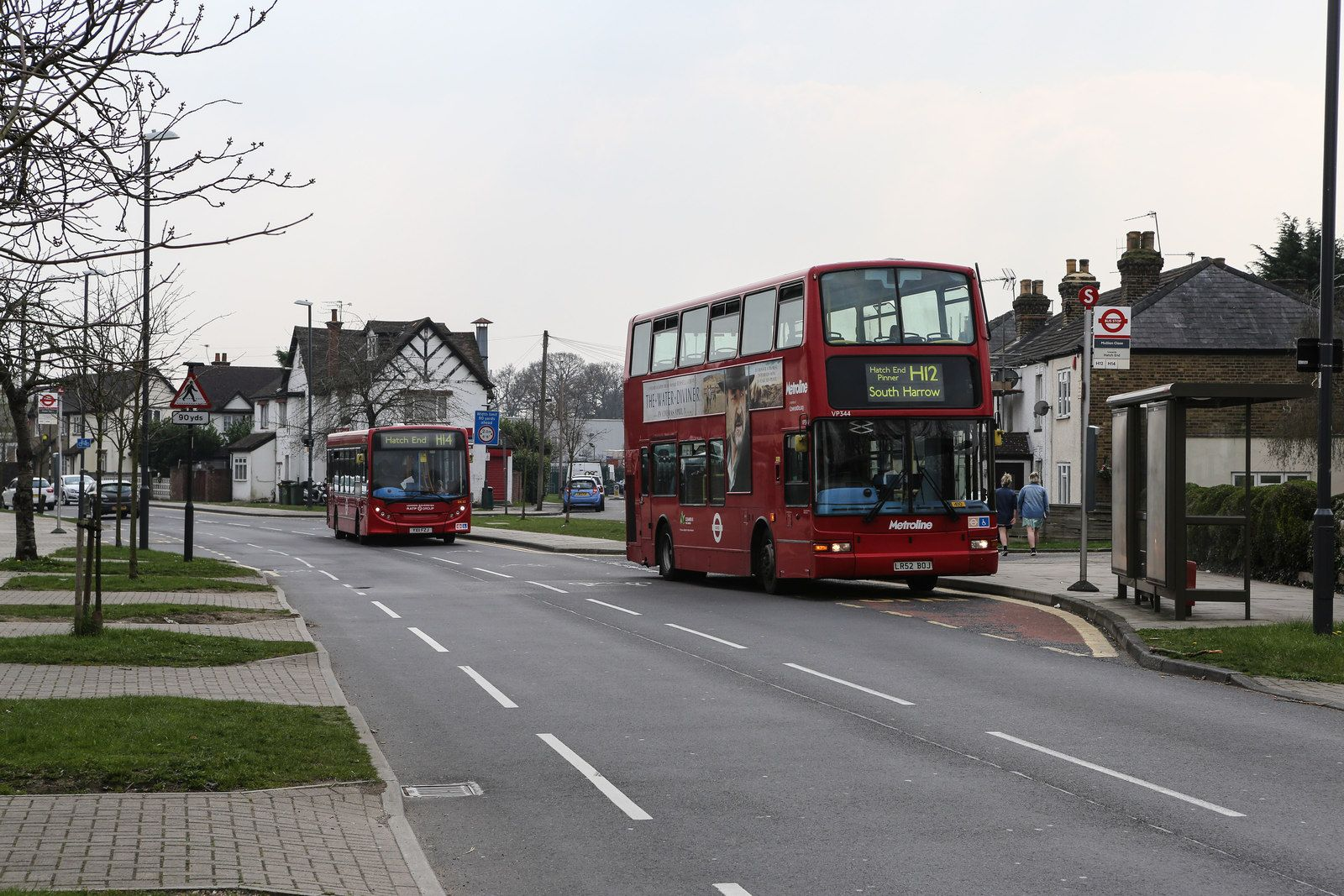
Buses on Headstone Lane

The area benefits from frequent bus services towards the more commercialised Harrow, to Hatch End very close to the north, to Pinner south-westwards and Stanmore, north-eastwards.

Headstone Lane railway station has three trains per hour in both directions. The station is on the line between Watford Junction and London Euston, providing a fast but stopping service to these destinations and a therefore less convenient service without changing once for destinations of Aylesbury and Milton Keynes; it marks the heart of the neighbourhood, parts of which around the manor recreation grounds merge seamlessly with the area to the south, North Harrow.
