= Tower Gardens Estate =

Housing estate in London

Tower Gardens
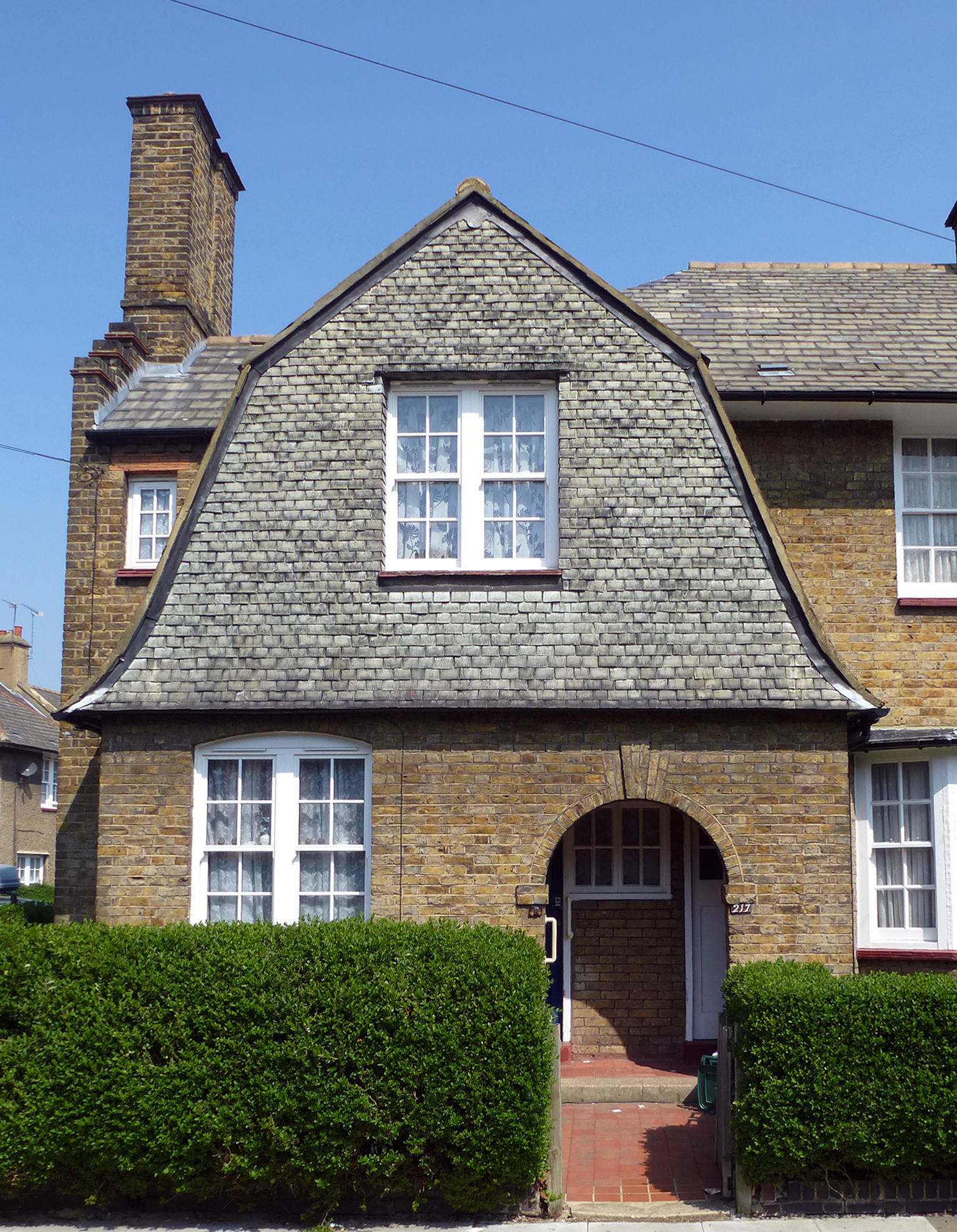
- Tower Gardens Estate end terrace house
- Interactive map of Tower Gardens

General information
- Location: Tottenham, London
- Coordinates: 51.600°N 0.087°W
- Status: conservation area (1978), article 4 direction (1981)
- Area: 138 acres (56 ha)
- No. of units: 2230 houses

Construction
- Constructed: 1904 to 1927
- Authority: London County Council
- Style: Cottage Estate
- Influence: Garden city movement, Arts and Crafts movement

Tower Gardens in North Tottenham is a distinctive semi-circular estate bounded by Lordship Lane and the Roundway. Constructed between 1904 and 1928 in the arts and crafts style.

It was one of the first municipal "cottage estates" and foremost housing design of its type in the world. Tower Gardens was the largest of the four original LCC cottage estates and the first estate to be built outside the LCC administrative area.

The LCC purchased the land in 1901 for £90,225, and started building in 1904. In 1899, Samuel Montagu, 1st Baron Swaythling of the 4% Dwelling Company & Montague Bank had offered the Council a piece of land in Edmonton. When difficulties arose about accepting the land, he made an alternative off of £10,000 towards the cost of development with the condition that "all houses erected thereunder shall be offered in the first instance, and from time to time as vacancies occur, to residents of three-years' standing and upwards in the Whitechapel division on Tower Hamlets, without distinction of race or creed". The donation enabled the building of the central park, originally referred to as "Tower Garden", and was such that the houses could have baths and built-in cupboards, etc.

The estate was originally known as the White Hart Lane Estate, and the land it covered was larger, including land that was later sold off and land that was built north of the Roundway, as seen in the plan for the estate from 1920. The section that benefitted from the donation was known as the Tower Gardens Section, as seen in the plan from 1915. Over time this name was used for the whole area south of the Roundway and the original name was forgotten. The conservation plan refers to "Tower Garden Estate".

The architects William Edward Riley (until 1919) and George Topham Forest (1919–1924) were the Chief Architects of the LCC when the estate was built, and the drawing all bear their names. The examining officers' initials that appear on the drawings of the pre-war section of the estate are those of E.P. Wheeler, A. Floyd and E. Parkes, which were probably working under the general supervision of A.M. Philips.

The estate is now an Article 4 conservation area, which protects original front facing architectural and design features, including the privet hedges. The council with English Heritage published Special Planning guidance to protect its quality Arts and Crafts architectural features. Article 4 is and has been enforced by the council.

== Context ==
LCC cottage estates 1918–1939
Estate name	Area	No of dwellings	Population 1938	Population density
Pre-1914
Norbury	11	218	867	19.8 per acre (49/ha)
Old Oak	32	736	3519	23 per acre (57/ha)
Totterdown Fields	39	1262	—	32.4 per acre (80/ha)
Tower Gardens; White Hart Lane	98	783	5936	8 per acre (20/ha)
1919–1923
Becontree	2770	25769 (Note: Source says 2589 – transcription error)	115652	9.3 per acre (23/ha)
Bellingham	252	2673	12004	10.6 per acre (26/ha)
Castelnau	51	644	2851	12.6 per acre (31/ha)
Dover House Estate; Roehampton Estate	147	1212	5383	8.2 per acre (20/ha)
1924–1933
Downham	600	7096	30032	11.8 per acre (29/ha)
Mottingham	202	2337	9009	11.6 per acre (29/ha)
St Helier	825	9068	39877	11 per acre (27/ha)
Watling	386	4034	19110	10.5 per acre (26/ha)
Wormholt	68	783	4078	11.5 per acre (28/ha)
1934–1939
Chingford (Note: Part of a larger PRC estate around Huntsman Road)	217	1540	—	7.1 per acre (18/ha)
Hanwell (Ealing)	140	1587	6732	11.3 per acre (28/ha)
Headstone Lane	142	n.a	5000	
Kenmore Park	58	654	2078	11.3 per acre (28/ha)
Thornhill (Royal Borough of Greenwich)	21	380	1598	18.1 per acre (45/ha)
Whitefoot Lane (Downham)	49	n.a	n.a.	
Source: Yelling, J. A. (1995). "Banishing London's slums: The interwar cottage estates" (PDF). Transactions. 46. London and Middlesex Archeological Society: 167–173. Quotes: Rubinstein, 1991, Just like the country.

The Conservation Area comprises the oldest parts of the estate, built by the London County Council between 1904 and 1913. It is one of the first "cottage estates" in the world and is characterised by good quality and practical buildings that show an inventive use of materials and vernacular motifs typical of the Arts and Crafts Movement. Along with Hampstead Garden Suburb, Tower Gardens is one of the most important estates of its type in London.

The properties are mostly two-up, two-down with some three bed houses and also flats in Topham Square.

The curiously named streets belie the area's history. Most appear to be named after someone who once owned the land, from Siward, Earl of Northumberland, in the time of Edward the Confessor, through to Thomas Smith in 1792. A project by Risley Avenue School in conjunction with Bruce Castle Museum identified the streets as named after the "Lords of Tottenham".

== Architecture ==
The terraced houses in Tower Gardens are small and were not expensively built but they have many small architectural features which differ with every street. They are predominantly brick, tile and pebble dash cottages in a style that owes something to the Arts and Crafts movement of the time. The original design was under the direction of architect W. E. Riley, a member of the Art Workers Guild. The façades change all over the estate and in places terraces of four houses were designed to look like country mansions.

Features of interest include the gables, dormers, impressive chimneys, long roofs, low eaves, porches and two story projecting bays. Historical images can be found in the London Picture Archive and elsewhere.

Earlier houses are smaller and have front doors opening into the single reception room. All houses had a toilet (also known as a water closet), but in the smaller houses this was in a little projection at the rear and entered from outside. Not all houses had a bath, and some had to make do with a tub that was hung in the scullery. Larger houses have front doors opening onto a hall with stairs and a second reception room.

Whilst the design of the estate was influenced by the Garden City Movement, the grid layout of the lower half of the estate was not entirely in the tradition of the garden suburbs, nor was the density of housing. However some houses were set back behind small greens and a large green area was provided for recreation including tennis and bowls. The trees lining the streets are protected and provide a boulevard feel, particularly Risley Avenue, privet hedges to the front of the properties within the conservation area are protected.

== Notable buildings ==
The building at 100 Tower Gardens Road was the estate office for the White Hart Lane Estate and is the only original public building on the estate.

The estate office is part of the Tower Gardens Conservation Area and the conservation management plan says that it “is a notable building, designed in a late-17th century domestic style with a steep hipped roof and dormers. The entrance has a deep concave surround in red rubbed brick with a heavy keystone.”

London County Council planned a meeting hall next to the estate office. Drawings were created and the building was costed at £4500 for the two buildings. The meeting hall was never built and the space next to the estate office was used for additional houses.

== Further information ==
Ruth Crowley, a resident, successfully petitioned Ordnance Survey in 2004 to classify Tower Gardens as an area on the map, similar to Stroud Green.

In 2003, she also petitioned London Open City to facilitate it being featured in the annual Open House London architecture weekend on the third Sunday in September, which continues to this day.

Tower Gardens was featured in a Royal Historical Society Conference '60 years on from the London County Council'. It was also the feature of a London Archives event on 28 May 2025 featuring the perspective of a Tower Gardens' resident.
