= G. Topham Forrest =

Scottish architect (1872–1945)

George Topham Forrest F.R.I.B.A., FGS, FRSE
- Born: 1872
- Died: 1945 (aged 72–73); Port Appin
- Education: Robert Gordon's College; King's College London
- Occupation: Architect
- Practice: Brown and Watt; London County Council (Chief Architect)
- Buildings: Becontree estate; Ossulston Estate; British Postgraduate Medical School
- Projects: Lambeth Bridge; Chelsea Bridge

George Topham Forrest, F.R.I.B.A. FGS FRSE (1872 – 1945) was a Scottish architect who became chief architect for the London County Council and was responsible for the design of many public housing estates, and also co-designed two bridges over the River Thames.

== Early life and training ==
Forrest attended Aberdeen Grammar School. He apprenticed with the architecture firm of Brown and Watt from 1890 to 1894 and also took classes at Robert Gordon's College. He then moved to London and worked as an improver for John Macvicar Anderson while taking classes at King's College and attending the Architectural Association studios.

== Local government career ==
From 1898 to 1899 he was chief assistant in the Leeds City Engineer's Office, primarily working on overseeing improvements in working-class housing. From 1899 to 1905 he was principal assistant in the West Riding County Architect's Department, Yorkshire; at first he worked on asylums, but in 1903 he was put in charge of all county education design. In 1905 he became the county Education Architect for Northumberland and in 1914 Essex County Architect.

In 1919 he became architect to the London County Council and held that post until his retirement in 1935. His work there included the British Postgraduate Medical School building in Hammersmith, many schools and hospitals, and the architecture of Lambeth Bridge (with Reginald Blomfield) and Chelsea Bridge. Pevsner called the Chelsea Bridge design "concise and functional".

His time at the LCC coincided with most of the great interwar period of construction of council houses and flats: approximately 61,000 units by the outbreak of World War II. In particular, he was in charge of the development of the Becontree estate, which had 26,000 units by itself; he was recruited from Essex specifically to plan it.

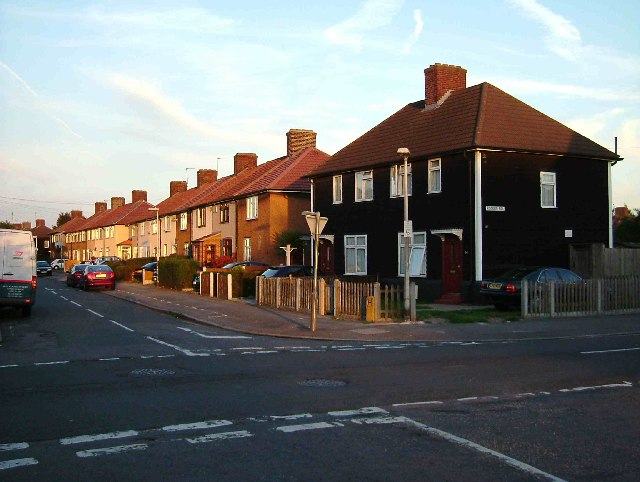
Neo-Georgian council houses on the Becontree Estate

Forrest oversaw the design, layout and construction of the council dwellings, so those built during his tenure reflect his preference for plain neo-Georgian architecture, with houses having square-paned sash windows, unadorned brick facades, and plain front doors with small canopies above. This is seen clearly at the largest LCC housing estate, Becontree, where most of the homes are 2-storey cottages in short terraces and despite varied groupings and one of the first uses of cul-de-sacs, which the planners called 'banjos' after their shape, there is an overall impression of uniformity. However, on the LCC's most important non-suburban estate built during this period, Ossulston Estate in Camden Town, he was influenced by Modernist workers' housing he had seen in Vienna. Also, under the influence of the Garden city movement, he had the buildings on LCC estates laid out informally and grouped at road junctions and around small greens. For example, at the Tottenham estate known as Tower Gardens or White Hart Lane, the pre-World War I southern portion designed by W.E. Riley has 2-storey terraced houses on a grid, whilst in the northern section built under Forrest after the war, the housing is less dense and is grouped around an axis where tennis courts and a community club were provided; there were also originally 4 allotments. At the St Helier Estate, he retained trees and hedgerows where possible and had shrubberies and greens planted, and the housing is deliberately varied in appearance. Even at the high-density Ossulston estate, the flats are grouped around courtyards and greens accessed through archways.

Forrest became a Licentiate of the Royal Institute of British Architects on 27 February 1911 and was elected a Fellow in early 1919.

In 1921 he was elected a Fellow of the Royal Society of Edinburgh due to his amateur interests in geology. His proposers were Alexander Veitch Lothian, Sir John James Burnet, George Adam Smith and Sir J. Arthur Thomson.

He died on 31 March 1945 in Port Appin.

== Selected publications ==
Forrest wrote several journal articles and papers for professional societies on designing for county councils, particularly on the design of schools, in addition to reports to the LCC. He co-edited and contributed to several volumes in the Survey of London and designed a reconstruction of the Globe Theatre as an appendix to an LCC publication on it.

- "County Council Schools: Their General Arrangement and Method of Building". The Surveyor and Municipal and County Engineer Supplement 28 February 1908, p. 16.
- Report on the Construction and Control of Buildings and the Development of Urban Areas in the United States of America. LCC, 1925. OCLC 500353265
- "London One Hundred Years Hence". Public Administration 4.2, April 1926, pp. 156–74.
- "Guiding a Modern City". Municipal Journal 15 April 1927, pp. 585–86.
