= Tudor Walters Report =

The Tudor Walters Report on housing was produced by the Tudor Walters Committee of the United Kingdom Parliament in October 1918. Its recommendations set the standards for council house design and location for the next 90 years.

== The committee ==
Tudor Walters was the chairman. Raymond Unwin, architect to Letchworth Garden City and Hampstead Garden Suburb, was a member.

== The background ==
In 1912 Raymond Unwin published a pamphlet, Nothing gained by Overcrowding, outlining the principles of the Garden City.

The Local Government Board in 1912 recommended that:

Cottages for the working classes should be built with wider frontages and grouped around open spaces which would become recreation grounds. They should have three bedrooms, a large living room, a scullery fitted with a bath and a separate WC to each house with under cover access

They published five model plans. Two had an additional parlour, four were terraced and one was semi detached. They had an area 820 square feet (76 m^{2}) to 1,230 square feet (114 m^{2}).

The First World War indirectly provided a new impetus. The poor physical health and condition of many urban recruits to the army was noted with alarm. This led to a campaign known as "Homes fit for heroes". The Office for Works built the Well Hall Estate in Eltham for workers at the Royal Ordnance Factory in Woolwich. This had been built on Garden City principles with fine Arts and Crafts details.

== The recommendations ==
The committee expected to

Profoundly influence the general standard of housing in this country and to encourage the building of houses of such quality that they would remain above the acceptable minimum standards for at least sixty years.

We regard it essential that each house should contain a minimum of three rooms on the ground floor (living-room, parlour, scullery) and three bedrooms above, two of these capable of containing two beds. A larder and a bathroom are essential.

Housing was to be in short terraces, spaced at 70 feet (21 m) at a density of 12 per acre (30/ha) in town or 8 per acre (20/ha) in the country. This was to allow the penetration of sunlight even in winter. There was to be secondary access to the sides of semi-detached houses and by ground floor passages through larger terraces. These terraces should be a maximum of eight houses long. The advantages of cul de sacs were noted as cheap method of providing services and preventing through traffic. The Committee noted the advantages of a varied provision of housing types and not restricting an estate to one social class.

Deep narrow-fronted byelaw terraced houses were to be avoided as the rear projection reduced air flow and light to the back of the house. (The middle-room problem). Wider frontages were preferred. A Tudor Walters house had an average frontage of 22 feet 6 inches (6.86 m). The living room should be a light room and ideally a through room.

Three basic plans were suggested, based on cost and where the cooking would be done:

- Living room with range where most of the cooking would be done, scullery with copper to heat the water, a bath and a gas cooker for occasional use.
- A separate bathroom, cooking done in the scullery and the living room fire suitable only for occasional cooking
- A separated upstairs bathroom, cooking done exclusively in the scullery. Meals would be eaten in the living room.

In addition it was suggested that superior houses would have a parlour. This was a reasonable expectation for the artisan class.

A parlour house was to be 1,055 square feet (98.0 m^{2}) and a non parlour house to be 855 square feet (79.4 m^{2}). In the climate of 1918, 85% of the houses needed to be three-bedroom and 15% to be smaller or bigger. Pre-war the divide had been 40%/60%. The bedrooms should be 150 square feet (14 m^{2}),100 square feet (9.3 m^{2}) and 65 square feet (6.0 m^{2}). A parlour of 120 square feet (11 m^{2}) was seen to be adequate, in effect 12 by 10 feet (3.7 m × 3.0 m). It was a quiet room for reading, writing, a sick relative or formal entertaining of non-family visitors.

It also suggested the use of district heating using waste heat from power-stations, the use of standardised components, the positioning of community facilities, integration with public transport and phasing the construction of both.

=== Table ===
Tudor Walters Committee Recommendations
House without a parlour	Area ft^{2} (m^{2})	Volume ft^{3} (m^{3})	House with a parlour	Area ft^{2} (m^{2})	Volume ft^{3} (m^{3})
			Parlour	120 (11)	960 (27)
Living Room	180 (17)	1,440 (41)	Living Room	180 (17)	1,440 (41)
Scullery	80 (7.4)	640 (18)	Scullery	80 (7.4)	640 (18)
Larder	24 (2.2)	-	Larder	24 (2.2)	-
Bedroom No. 1	150 (14)	1,200 (34)	Bedroom No. 1	160 (15)	1,280 (36)
Bedroom No. 2	100 (9.3)	800 (23)	Bedroom No. 2	120 (11)	960 (27)
Bedroom No. 3	65 (6.0)	520 (15)	Bedroom No. 3	110 (10)	880 (25)
Total	855 ft^{2} (79.4 m^{2})			1,055 ft^{2} (98.0 m^{2})	
Desirable Minimum sizes - Tudor Walters Committee

== The legacy ==
In 1919 the government required councils to provide housing, helping them to do so through the provision of subsidies under Housing, Town Planning, &c. Act 1919. The Housing of the Working Classes Act 1890 had merely permitted them to do so. They were to be built to the Tudor Walters standards.

== See also ==
- Parker Morris Committee
