= St Helier, London =

Housing estate in London

Coordinates: 51.38256°N 0.18361°W

St Helier
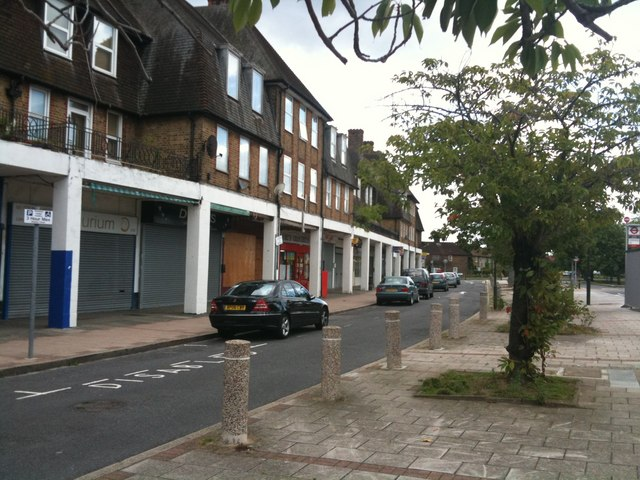
- Shops at Green Lane, St Helier

- Location within Greater London
- Population: 11,949 (2011 Census Sutton Ward); 10,414 (2011 Census. Merton Ward)
- OS grid reference: TQ265664
- London borough: Sutton; Merton
- Ceremonial county: Greater London
- Region: London
- Country: England
- Sovereign state: United Kingdom
- Post town: MORDEN
- Postcode district: SM4
- Post town: CARSHALTON
- Postcode district: SM5
- Dialling code: 020
- Police: Metropolitan
- Fire: London
- Ambulance: London
- UK Parliament: Mitcham and Morden; Carshalton and Wallington
- London Assembly: Croydon and Sutton; Merton and Wandsworth

St Helier (/ˈhɛliər/) is a residential housing estate in the London boroughs of Merton and Sutton. The portion of the estate north of Green Lane and Bishopsford Road is in the borough of Merton in the town of Morden, the remainder is in the borough of Sutton in the towns of Sutton and Carshalton.

== History ==
The site of the St Helier estate has been connected to long-term charity since the early 17th century. Henry Smith (d. 1627) was a wealthy citizen and salter of London who gave much money to parishes in London and Surrey during his lifetime and in his will. He is buried in Wandsworth parish church and is supposed to have been born in Wandsworth. In 1617 he gave £500 towards the purchase of land in Carshalton, the rent of which was to support the poor of Wandsworth. Another £100 bequest came from Mrs. Elizabeth Blackwell. In 1814 the lands were described as being just over 116 acres and having a building, barn and outhouses. The Wandsworth Poor Lands lay on either side of Wrythe Lane at the southernmost part of the St. Helier estate footprint. Another local benefactor was Christopher Muschamp, who died in 1660 and is buried at All Saints, Carshalton. He bequeathed £200 to buy land, the yearly rental of which was to purchase apprenticeships for two poor children who had been born in the parish. Pasture land was bought from Henry Byne in Cannon Sheephouse Lane, which is now known as Green Wrythe Lane. Like the adjoining Sutton Common, most of the area remained semi-rural until the early 20th century.

Though it remained part of Surrey until 1965, the estate was built between 1928 and 1936 by the London County Council as an overspill estate for the re-housing of people from decaying inner London areas. It was designed as a garden city, with landscaping by the landscape architect Edward Prentice Mawson.

Development was spurred by the opening of Morden Underground station in 1926, and the Wimbledon to Sutton railway line in 1930, with a station at St Helier. These services provided rapid links into central London for the residents.

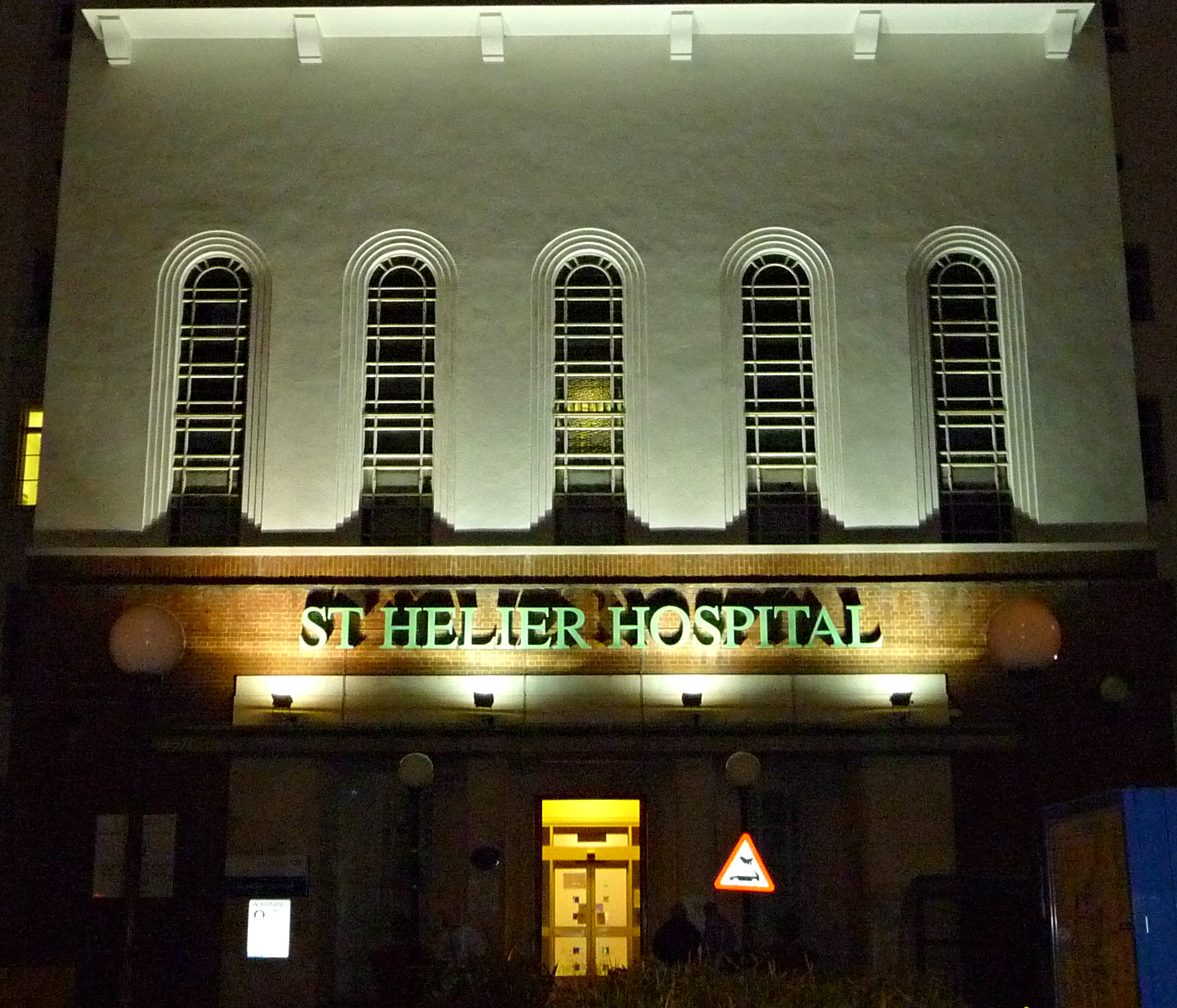
The art deco entrance of St Helier Hospital floodlit at night

The estate was named in honour of Lady St Helier, who was an LCC Alderman from 1910 to 1927. It was the second largest (after the Becontree-Dagenham estate) of a series of 'out-county' cottage estates and was based on the Garden City ideas of Ebenezer Howard. The area had previously consisted largely of lavender fields, the last remnants of the famous Mitcham lavender industry.

In remembrance of the area's historic ownership by Westminster Abbey, the roads are named in alphabetical order after Monasteries and Abbeys starting in the north-west with Aberconway Road and ending with Woburn Road in the south-east.

The imposing St Helier Hospital was opened in 1938. John Major, UK Prime Minister from 1990 to 1997, was born there in 1943.

The estate's Bishop Andrewes Church, in Wigmore Road, was designed by the architect Geddes Hyslop in 1933.

== Today ==
Today ownership of housing on the estate is split between private and local authority, with many people taking advantage of the right to buy scheme since the 1970s. The hospital still exerts an imposing presence on the estate, both economically and physically. Most of the buildings are original and many are still being used for their original purposes. There has some infilling around the outskirts, and the estate now merges into the suburbs of Sutton, Carshalton and Morden.

The area is served by the London bus routes 80, 151, 154, 157, 164, 280, 470, N44, S1, S2, 93 and St Helier railway station.

== Governance ==
St Helier is divided between the Mitcham and Morden and Carshalton and Wallington constituencies for elections to the House of Commons of the United Kingdom. St Helier is divided between the St Helier ward to elections to Merton London Borough Council, and the St Helier East and St Helier West wards for elections to Sutton London Borough Council.

== Nearest places ==
- Rosehill
- Benhilton
- Morden
- Carshalton
- Mitcham
- Sutton
- Sutton Common
- Wallington
- Beddington
- Hackbridge
- Lower Morden
