= Municipal Borough of Hendon =

Former local authority in Middlesex, England

Coordinates: 51.5883°N 0.2292°W

Hendon
- Local Government District (1879–1894); Urban District (1894–1932); Municipal Borough (1932–1965)
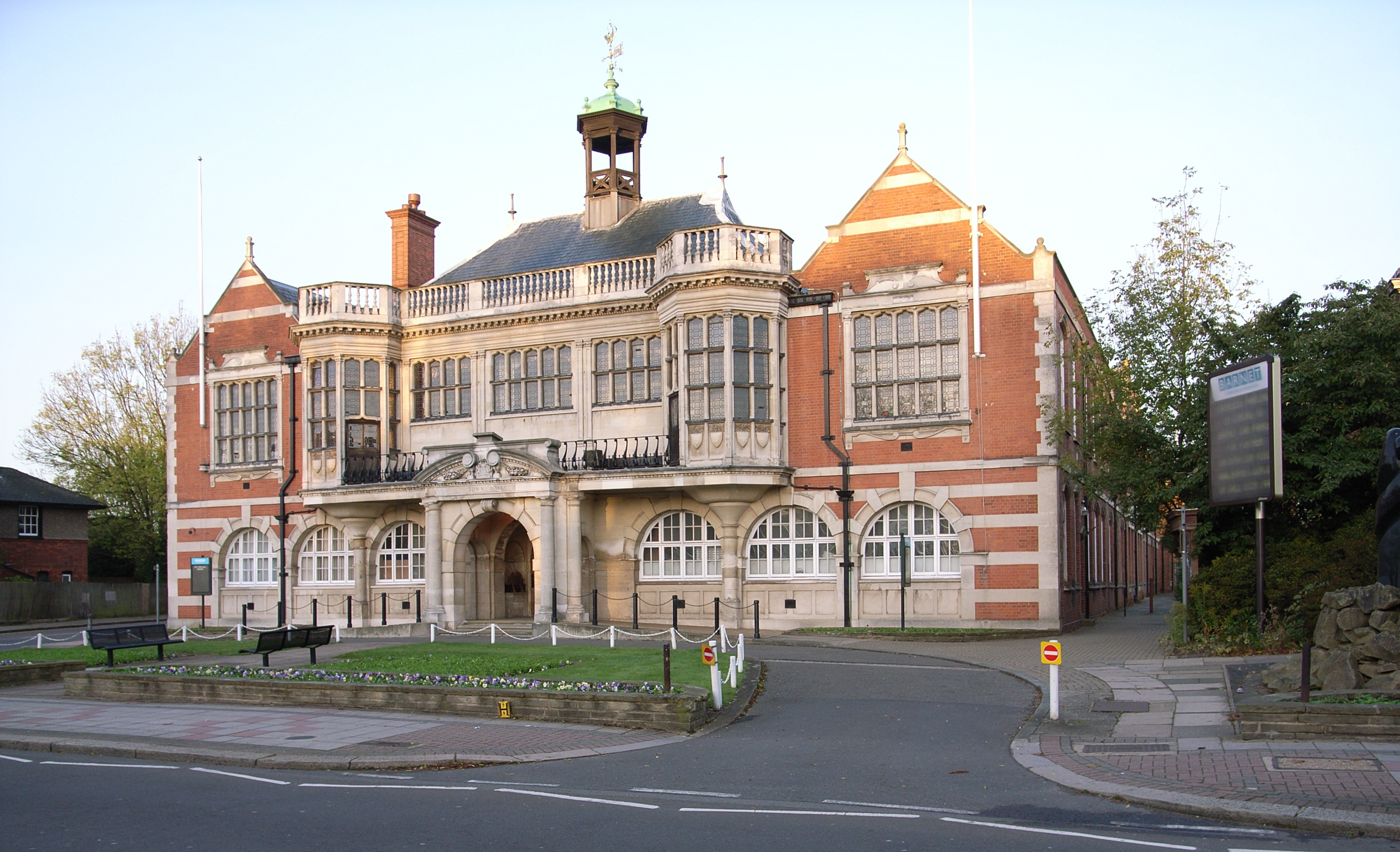
- Hendon Town Hall

- Hendon within Middlesex in 1961
- Area
  - 1894: 8,382 acres (34 km^{2})
  - 1965: 10,369 acres (42 km^{2})
- Population
  - 1901: 22,450
  - 1961: 151,843
- History
  - Created: 1879
  - Abolished: 1965
  - Succeeded by: London Borough of Barnet
- Status: Urban district (1894-1932); Municipal borough (1932-1965)
- Government
  - HQ: Hendon Town Hall
  - Motto: Endeavour
- Coat of Arms

Hendon was an ancient parish of around 8,250 acres (33 km^{2}) in Middlesex, on the border with Hertfordshire. As well as Hendon itself, the parish included Childs Hill, Golders Green and Mill Hill. In 1879 the parish was made a local government district. Such districts became urban districts in 1894. In 1931 the urban district absorbed the neighbouring parish of Edgware, and the following year the urban district was incorporated to become a municipal borough. The borough was abolished in 1965 when the area was transferred from Middlesex to Greater London and became part of the London Borough of Barnet.

== History ==
=== Background ===
The name is either a Saxon-Celtic fusion meaning high down (hill) or purely Celtic meaning old down (hill). Its earliest known use is in 1005 as Heandunigna. It was in the Hundred of Gore in the county of Middlesex.

Under an Act receiving Royal Asset of Henry VIII's the parish vestry took over many manorial responsibilities. Under Queen Victoria civil parishes in England took over secular functions, the shed religious equivalent became the ecclesiastical parish. The parish of Hendon was made a local government district in 1879. Such districts were reconstituted as urban districts under the Local Government Act 1894. The urban district was enlarged in 1931 to absorb the neighbouring parish of Edgware (previously part of the Hendon Rural District). The urban district was elevated to become a municipal borough in 1932 (reflected in the final coat of arms and its description). The latter was abolished in 1965 and the area became part of the London Borough of Barnet.

Between 1835 and 1930 Hendon (Poor Law) Union was a poor Law Union a division mentioned among many others in most census returns. This included many otherwise non-associated parishes: Edgware, Great Stanmore, Little Stanmore, Kingsbury, Harrow on the Hill, Pinner, Willesden. It also took in the ancient parish of Hendon and all its later guises described above.

=== Development ===
Map of the wards of the Municipal Borough of Hendon in the 1950s. Edgware ward resembles the separate old parish it formerly constituted and continued to do so in the Church of England. The rest was all Hendon parish, the major administrative unit for its residents and ratepayers until the Urban District was formed.

There is evidence of Roman activity in Hendon, and along its western edge runs the Roman Road Watling Street. Hendon Manor was recorded in the Domesday survey of 1087 as lands belonging to Westminster Abbey. From at least the Saxon period until the 14th century most economic activity was centred on the extensive woodlands, cultivated for firewood and pigs, and an ancient route out of London, passing through Hampstead, Golders Green, and Mill Hill, (with slight variation in its course) continued to be important until the early 19th century. During the 17th century the area became famous for its hay. In 1765 the manor came into the possession of the actor David Garrick. In 1868 a station was opened on the Midland Railway, and this encouraged some suburban development in Hendon during the 1880s and 1890s. Samuel Clarke established the Pyramid and Fairy light works in Child's Hill during 1885, the first of Hendon's factories, which was joined by a number of other manufactories but it was the arrival of the trams and tubes between 1906 and 1924, that promoted the greatest growth. This was twofold as it provided not only a means of commuting for people living in the area into central London, but also provided reasonable transport for workers to come into the area. By the 1930s Hendon was a recognised industrial area of London, with companies like Schweppes, Johnson's Photographic Ltd and Handley Page the aircraft manufacturers. However much of Hendon's industry was minor engineer units, often employing fewer than twenty people. During the post war period demand for new housing pushed industry out of the area, and established the district as solely suburban in nature.

Hendon is famous as the location of Hendon Aerodrome which was established by Claude Grahame-White in 1911.

=== Population 1801–1961 ===
Population changes in Hendon 1801–1961

Year	Population	±%
1801	1,955	—
1811	2,589	+32.4%
1821	3,100	+19.7%
1831	3,110	+0.3%
1841	3,327	+7.0%
1851	3,333	+0.2%

Year	Population	±%
1871	6,972	+109.2%
1881	10,484	+50.4%
1891	15,843	+51.1%
1901	22,450	+41.7%
1911	38,806	+72.9%
1921	56,013	+44.3%

Year	Population	±%
1931	115,682	+106.5%
1939	128,580	+11.1%
1951	155,857	+21.2%
1961	151,843	−2.6%

Source(s): Hendon CP/AP 1801–1961. Hendon MB/UD 1911–1961.

=== Coat of arms ===
Hendon was granted a coat of arms on 24 September 1932, when it became a municipal borough. Its arms was: Azure on a mount in base vert a Pascal Lamb proper, on a chief or two windmill sails in saltire sable. The crest was: On a wreath or and azure a two-bladed airscrew in pale, winged or. The supporters were: Dexter a griffin argent gorged with a mural crown gules and charged on the shoulder with a mullet sable; sinister a pegasus argent gorged with a mural crown gules and charged on the shoulder with an eagle displayed sable.

== Districts ==
Hendon contained the following present-day districts:

- Brent Street (Hendon)
- The Burroughs (Hendon)
- Childs Hill
- Church End (Hendon)
- Clitterhouse, part of which became Clitterhouse Recreation Ground
- Colindale
- Edgware
- Golders Green
- Grahame Park
- Hendon Central (Hendon)
- Holders Hill
- Mill Hill
- Parson Street (Hendon)
- Temple Fortune
- West Hendon

The following places were shared with other parishes:

- Burnt Oak was shared with Stanmore
- Cricklewood was shared with Willesden
- Hampstead Garden Suburb was shared with Finchley
- The Hyde was shared with Kingsbury
- North End was shared with Hampstead
