= Brent Park =

Brent Park may refer to:

- Brent Park, Hendon, a public park in Hendon, London
- Brent Park, Neasden, a retail area in Neasden, London
