= London Trades Council (1952) =

The London Trades Council (1952) brought together trade unions representing workers in London, in England.

== History ==
The council was formed on the initiative of the Trades Union Congress (TUC), which believed that the original London Trades Council was dominated by the Communist Party of Great Britain, and the new council explicitly excluded communists from membership, also prohibiting fascists from joining. Despite its official title, the council was founded in January 1953. The TUC de-recognised the old trades council, which was wound up later in the year. Unlike the old council, the new one did not act as a regional body for the local trades councils in the various areas of London, and so a London Federation of Trades Councils was also created, to fill that role.

Despite the discontinuity, the new council came to claim the history of the original trades council, and celebrated its centenary in 1960.

In 1974, the council drew up a women's charter, calling for equality in pay, opportunity, training and social services, and free nursery facilities, contraception and abortion services. Later in the year, both the council and the London Federation of Trades Councils were dissolved, and replaced by a new Greater London Association of Trade Union Councils.

== Leadership ==
=== Secretaries ===
1952: John Raeburn (Amalgamated Society of Woodworkers)

=== Chairmen ===
1952: Bob Willis (London Society of Compositors)
1959: Jock Halliday (Bakers' Union)
1970: Sidney Barton (National Union of Public Employees)

=== Treasurers ===
1952: Cyril Plant (Inland Revenue Staff Federation)
