= Hendon Town Hall =

Municipal building in London, England

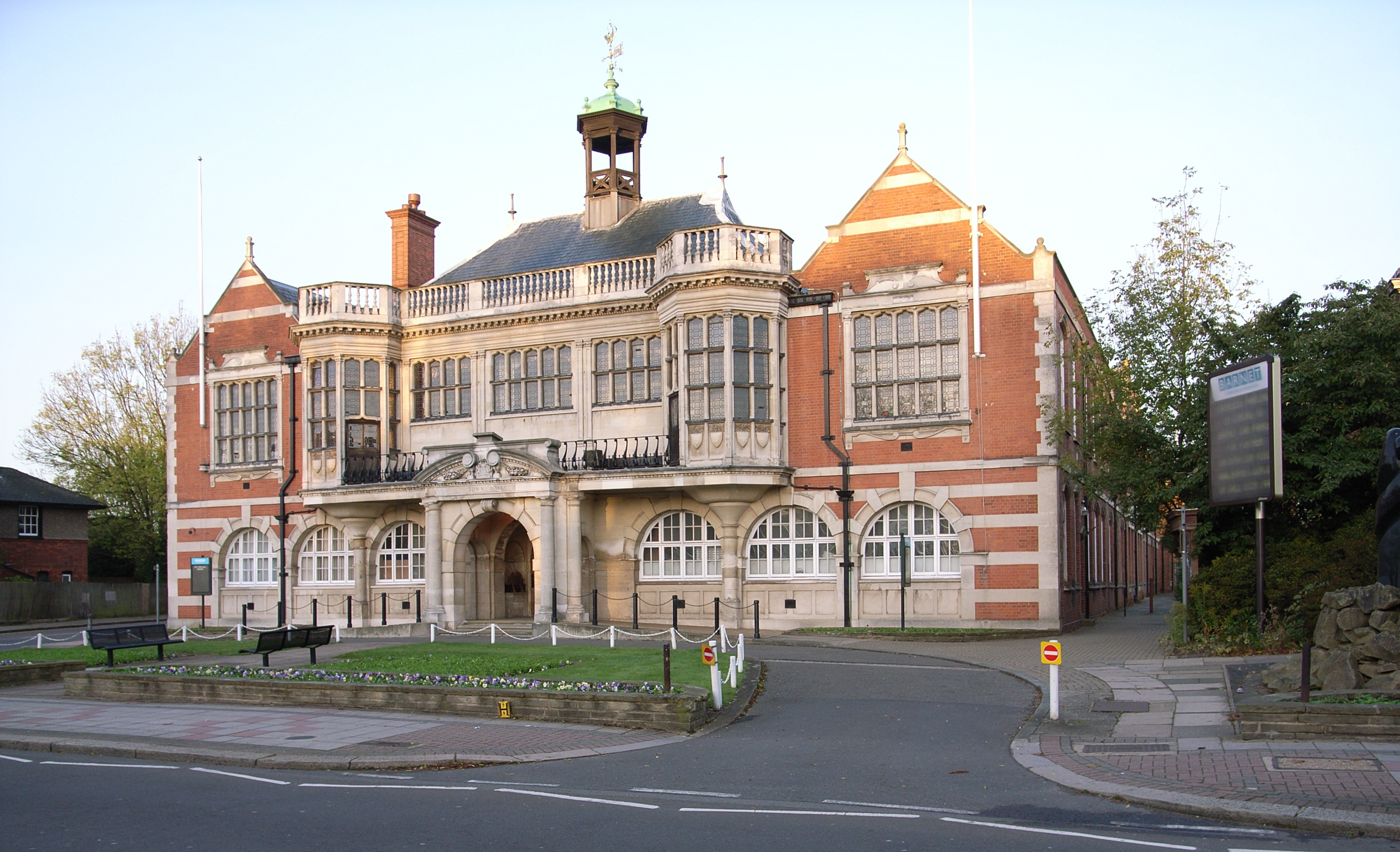
- Hendon Town Hall

- Shown in Barnet
- 51.5883°N 0.2292°W
- Location: Hendon

History
- Built: 1901

Site notes
- Architect: Thomas Henry Watson
- Architectural style: Pre-Renaissance style

Listed Building – Grade II
- Designated: 7 April 1983
- Reference no.: 1294762

Hendon Town hall is a municipal building in the Burroughs, Hendon, London. The town hall, which serves as a meeting place for Barnet London Borough Council, is a Grade II listed building.

== History ==
In the late 19th century the local board of health had held its meetings at the Hendon Union Workhouse in the Burroughs. After the formation of Hendon Urban District in 1896, civic leaders decided this arrangement was inadequate for their needs and decided to procure purpose-built municipal buildings: the site selected for the new facility in the Burroughs had previously been part of the Grove House estate.

The foundation stone for the new municipal buildings was laid the chairman of the council, John Evans, in 1900. The new building, which was designed by Thomas Henry Watson in the Pre-Renaissance style and was built by Kingerlee and Sons, was officially opened by the then chairman of the council, F.W. Roper, on 13 November 1901. The design involved a symmetrical main frontage with seven bays facing onto the Burroughs; the central section featured a porte-cochère flanked by Doric order columns on the ground floor; there were three mullion windows flanked by oriel windows on the first floor; on the roof a timber lantern with a weather vane was erected. The principal room was the council chamber on the first floor.

After the area was given municipal borough status as the Municipal Borough of Hendon, the building became known as "Hendon Town Hall" in 1932. It continued to be the local seat of government after the borough was merged with the Municipal Borough of Finchley and several urban districts to form the London Borough of Barnet in 1965.

Margaret Thatcher made her first speech as Prime Minister at the town hall in May 1979 and she returned to unveil a statue entitled the Family of Man by Itzhak Ofer in 1981. Finchley had never had its own town hall and Hendon Town Hall was sometimes, incorrectly, referred to by members of the press as "Finchley Town Hall" in the 1980s.

Barnet Trades Union Council, which had been dissolved during the deindustrialisation of the early 1990s, was reformed at the town hall in 2008. The Barnet register office, which had been based at Burnt Oak in Edgware, moved to the town hall in February 2017. Many of the other council officers and their departments, who had previously been located at disparate locations around the council area, moved to Barnet House in Colindale, just over a mile to the west of the town hall, in 2018. However, meetings of the full council have continued to be held at Hendon Town Hall.
