= Barnet Trades Union Council =

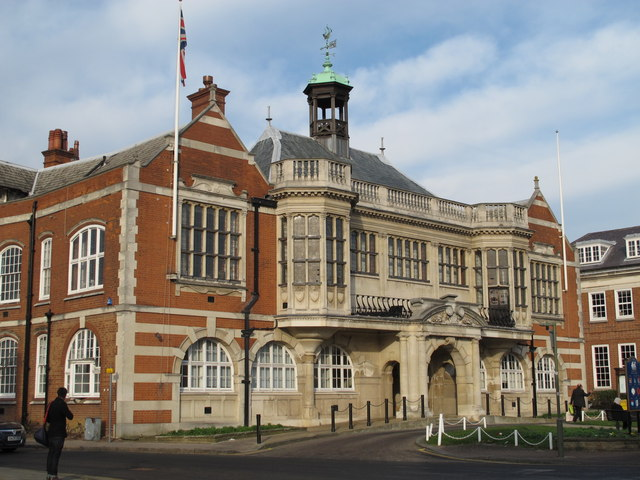
Barnet TUC was relaunched here, at Hendon town hall.

Barnet Trades Union Council (or 'Barnet TUC') is an association of trade union branches and individuals in Greater London, which describes itself as:

a group of people from across the London Borough of Barnet who support trade unions, and want to defend and improve public services.

Barnet TUC is affiliated to the Greater London Association of Trade Union Councils and the national Trades Union Congress. Founded in Barnet's industrial past, it folded during the deindustrialisation of the early 1990s, but reformed in 2008 in Hendon Town Hall.

Barnet TUC is group of people in the borough of Barnet who support trade unions and want to defend and improve public services. Part of the structure of the national Trades Union Congress (TUC), the constitution includes the aim: “To improve generally the economic and social conditions of working people, including seeking improvements to the social services, public education, housing and health.”

Activities include sharing news and ideas about trade union issues and discussing wider questions such as social justice and opposition to racism and other forms of discrimination.

== Past Campaigns ==
Since being reformed, it has campaigned on mainly local issues, but was also active over the Isle of Wight turbine factory closure.

The main issue since its relaunch has concerned the intention of the London Borough of Barnet to introduce a new model of local government delivery in the borough, called 'Future Shape', after commissioning a six-month external study. The first stages of 'Future Shape' were agreed by the council's cabinet in July 2009 The mainly public-sector union UNISON commissioned its own report on the issues involved in 'Future Shape'.

Barnet TUC has campaigned over the ending of full-time wardens at elderly peoples' accommodation, which has been an issue reported by the local media.
