= Sidney Barton (politician) =

British politician and trade unionist

Sidney James Barton (5 March 1909 – 20 January 1986) was a British politician and trade unionist.

Barton grew up in Wandsworth before becoming a laboratory technician with the Metropolitan Asylums Board. He joined the National Union of Public Employees (NUPE), and began working full-time for the union in 1934. He also joined the Labour Party, and in 1945 was elected to both Surrey County Council and the Municipal Borough of Sutton and Cheam, serving a single term on each. In 1952, he was elected as vice-chair of the London Trades Council, eventually becoming chair in 1970.

In 1950, Barton was elected to the executive of the London Labour Party. In 1953, he was appointed to London County Council, as an alderman, and he was Chairman of London County Council in 1959/1960. He continued in his trade union post, and from 1962 served as a national officer of NUPE. In 1964, he was additionally appointed as an alderman in the new London Borough of Sutton. In November 1969, Barton was appointed a part-time member of the London Transport Board He retired from most of his posts in 1974, and left the executive of the London Labour Party in 1978.

Civic offices
Preceded by Albert Samuels	Chairman of London County Council; 1959–1960	Succeeded by Florence Cayford
Trade union offices
Preceded by Jock Halliday?	Chairman of London Trades Council; 1970–1974	Council dissolved
