= Greater London Association of Trade Union Councils =

GLATUC logo

Greater London Association of Trade Union Councils (GLATUC) is the largest County Association of Trades (Union) Councils in the Uk and covers the Greater London area. As the official Trades Union Congress body for London GLATUC seeks to co-ordinate activity by Trades (Union) Councils across the capital and works with individual unions and other organisations on a range of campaigns and activities. It is part of the national Trades Union Congress.

== History ==
GLATUC is the successor body to the London Trades Council (LTC), which was founded in 1860. In the 1950s the LTC was in conflict with the TUC, and it was replaced by the London Trades Council (1952) and the London Federation of Trades Councils was set up. GLATUC succeeded both these organisations in 1974, originally called the Greater London Association of Trades Councils.

In 1985, on the 125th anniversary of the foundation of the London Trades Council, the GLATC (as it was then known) published its official history in a booklet largely compiled and written by Phil Katz of the Cities of London & Westminster Trades Council and an Assistant Secretary of the Association. This booklet is now out of print but copies are available in some libraries.

== Structure ==
GLATUC is made up of delegates from the trades councils covering the London boroughs.

They are:

- Bexley and Greenwich
- Bexley
- Barking and Dagenham
- Barnet
- Brent
- Bromley
- Camden
- Cities of London and Westminster* see www.clwtc.org
- Croydon
- Ealing
- Enfield
- Hackney
- Hammersmith & Fulham
- Haringey
- Harrow
- Havering
- Hillingdon
- Hounslow
- Islington
- Kensington and Chelsea
- Kingston upon Thames
- Lambeth
- Lewisham
- Merton and Sutton
- Newham
- Redbridge
- Richmond & Twickenham
- Southwark
- Tower Hamlets
- Waltham Forest
- Wandsworth

GLATUC meets on the second Saturday of each month, from 10 am. The meetings are open to any London trade unionists as observers, on production of a valid trade union membership card.

GLATUC's Annual General Meeting elects officers and executive committee members, who also meet once a month.
