= T. H. Watson =

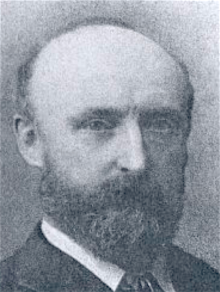
Portrait of Thomas Henry Watson

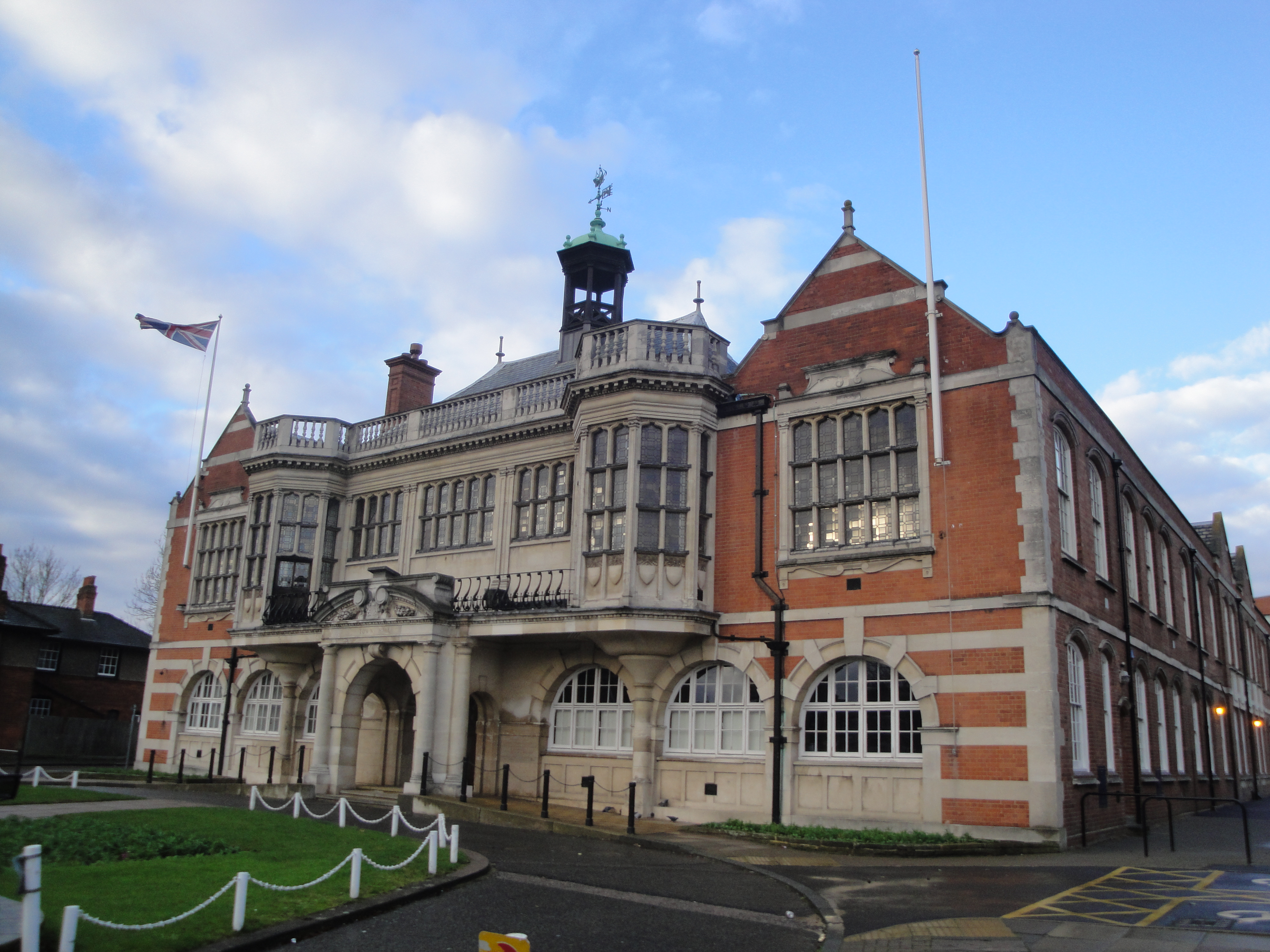
Hendon Town Hall, 2011

Thomas Henry Watson FRIBA (1 November 1839 – 13 January 1913) was a British architect.

== Early life ==
He was born on 1 November 1839, the son of John Burges Watson (1803–1881), architect of the picturesque landmark, Duck Island Cottage in St James's Park.

In 1863, Thomas Watson became an associate and graduate of the Royal Institute of British Architects, passing their exams in the class of proficiency. In 1863 and 1864, he was awarded the Sir W. Tite Prize and a medal of merit. In 1866, he passed the exams in the class of distinction.

== Career ==
Watson designed St Luke's Church, Deptford, London, which was built from 1870 to 1872.

In January 1875, it was reported in The British Architect that Watson had been elected as District Surveyor for St George, Hanover Square (North), and was described as "a very accomplished architect". In the same article, it was noted that Watson was a past president of the Architectural Association.

In 1900, he designed Hendon Town Hall, in north London, which is now a Grade II listed building.

His son A.M. Watson was also an architect, and by 1904, they had formed the architectural practice T.H. Watson and A.M. Watson.

Together with his son A.M. Watson, they designed a new house at Whitney Court, Whitney-on-Wye, Herefordshire, in 1898.

In 1901–02, Watson designed Ashland House for Portland Industrial Dwellings (independent of, but part-owned by the Portland Estate) in London's Marylebone, on the corner of Ashland Place and Paradise (Moxon) Street. In 1904, T.H. Watson and A.M. Watson designed a building for them at 9 Garbutt Place. However, in 1908, they turned down the opportunity to develop a site on the corner of Paradise Street and Ossington Buildings, which was designed by architect was W. Henry White instead.

== Personal life ==
His son A. M. Watson was also an architect.

He died on 13 January 1913.
