= Brent Park, Hendon =

Park in London, England

Coordinates: 51.5849°N 0.2114°W

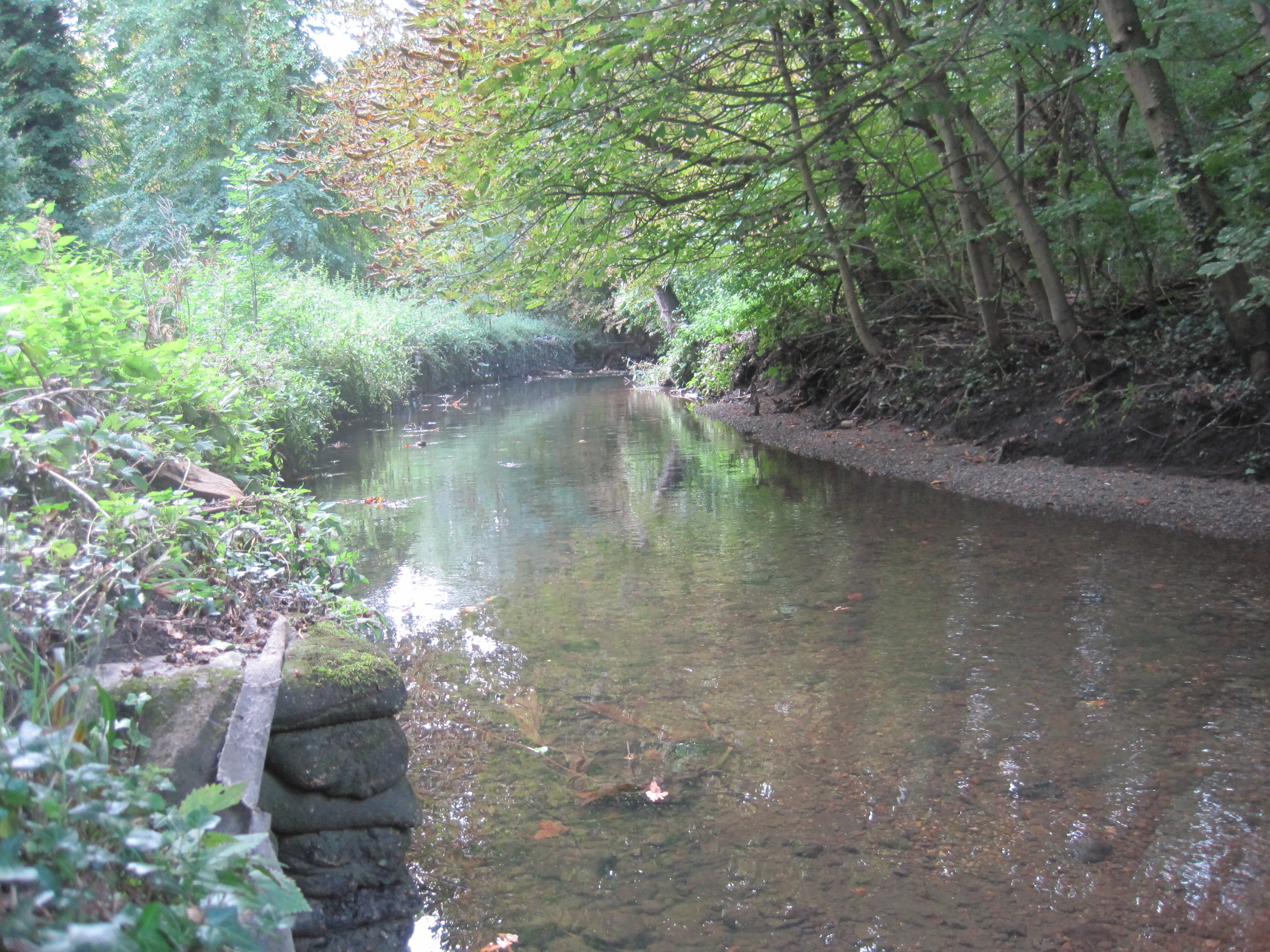
River Brent in Brent Park

Brent Park is a small public park of 2.24 hectares in Hendon in the London Borough of Barnet. It is part of the 'Lower Dollis Brook' Site of Borough Importance for Nature Conservation, Grade II.

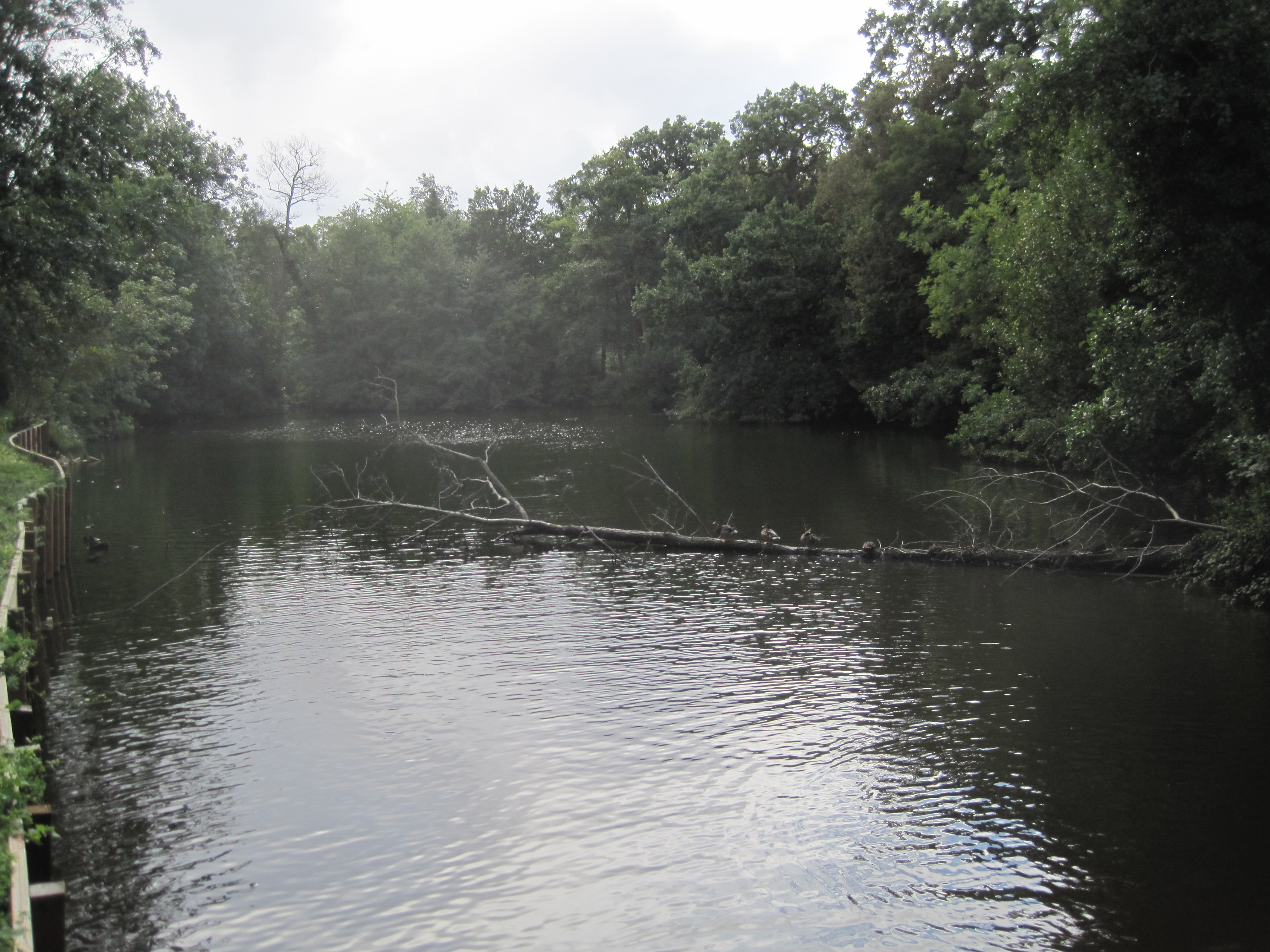
The pond was part of a lake constructed as a duck decoy

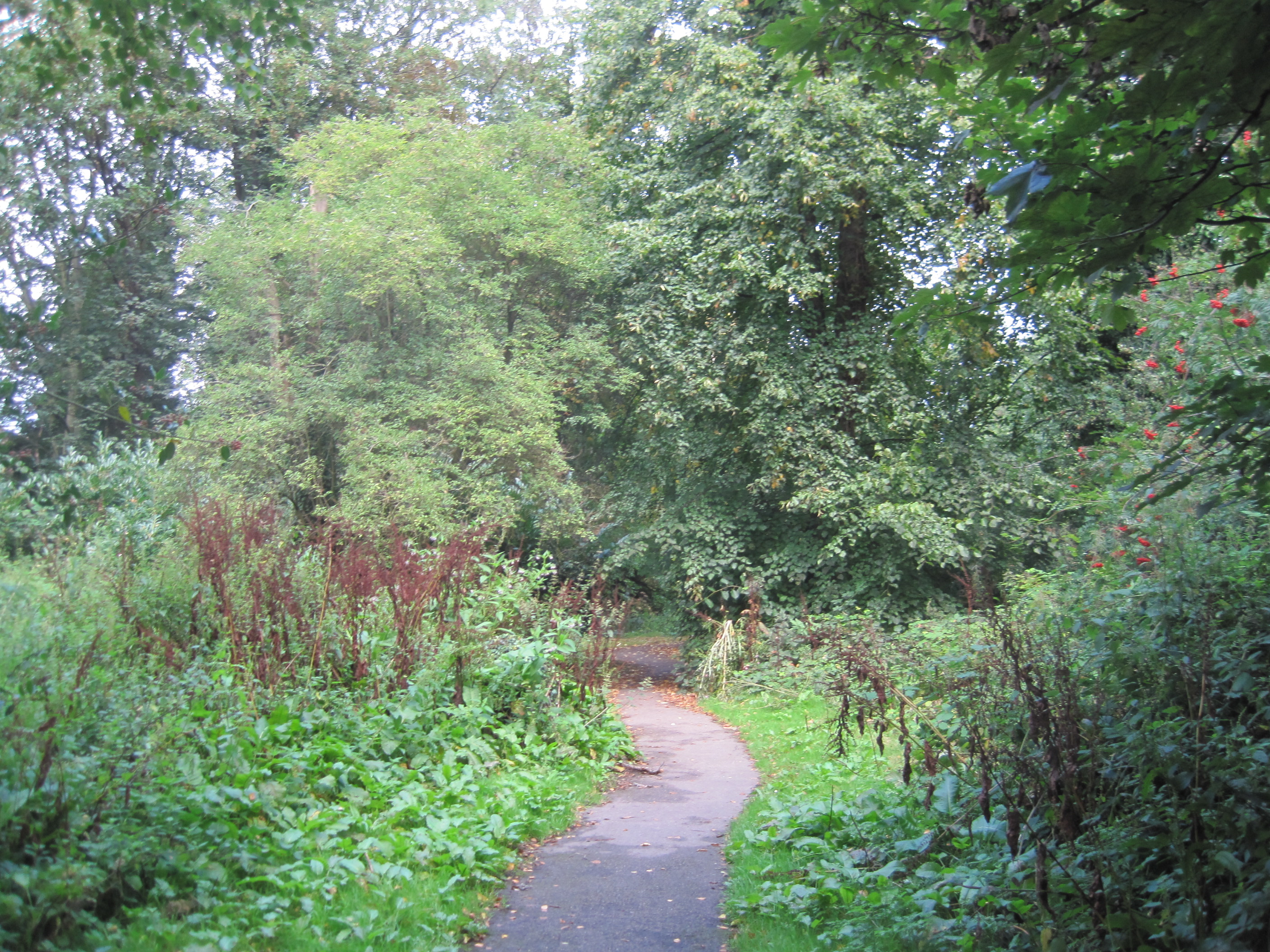
Path in Brent Park

The park is a narrow wooded strip of land west of the North Circular Road between Brent Street and Bell Lane. It is almost wholly managed for nature conservation apart from a small area of mown grass at the northern end.

The River Brent runs along the western edge, and there are three ponds next to the river. These are the remains of a lake built possibly as long as a thousand years ago by the abbots of Westminster as a duck decoy. Tufted ducks, mallards, coots and moorhens still nest on a wooded island on one of the ponds.

An Ordnance Survey map of 1875 shows the park as part of Decoy Wood, the grounds of Brent Bridge House, which stood at the southern end, while it was surrounded by Decoy Farm. The park was opened in 1934, and the house was demolished the following year.

The Capital Ring goes through Brent Park.

There is access from North Circular Road, Brent Street and Bell Lane.

== See also ==
- Nature reserves in Barnet
- Barnet parks and open spaces
