= Clitterhouse Recreation Ground =

Park in Brent Cross, London, England

Coordinates: 51.569°N 0.215°W

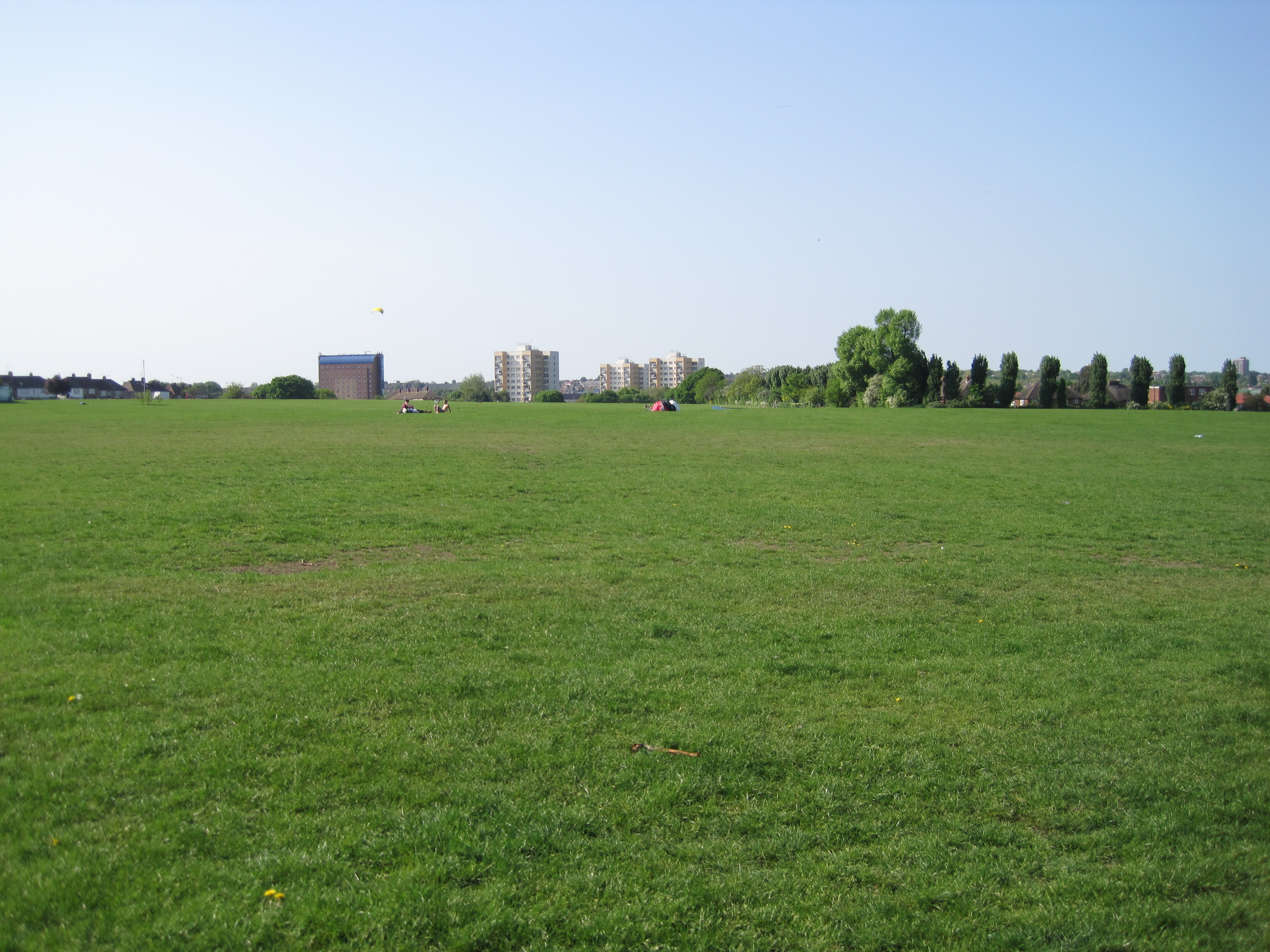
Clitterhouse Recreation Ground

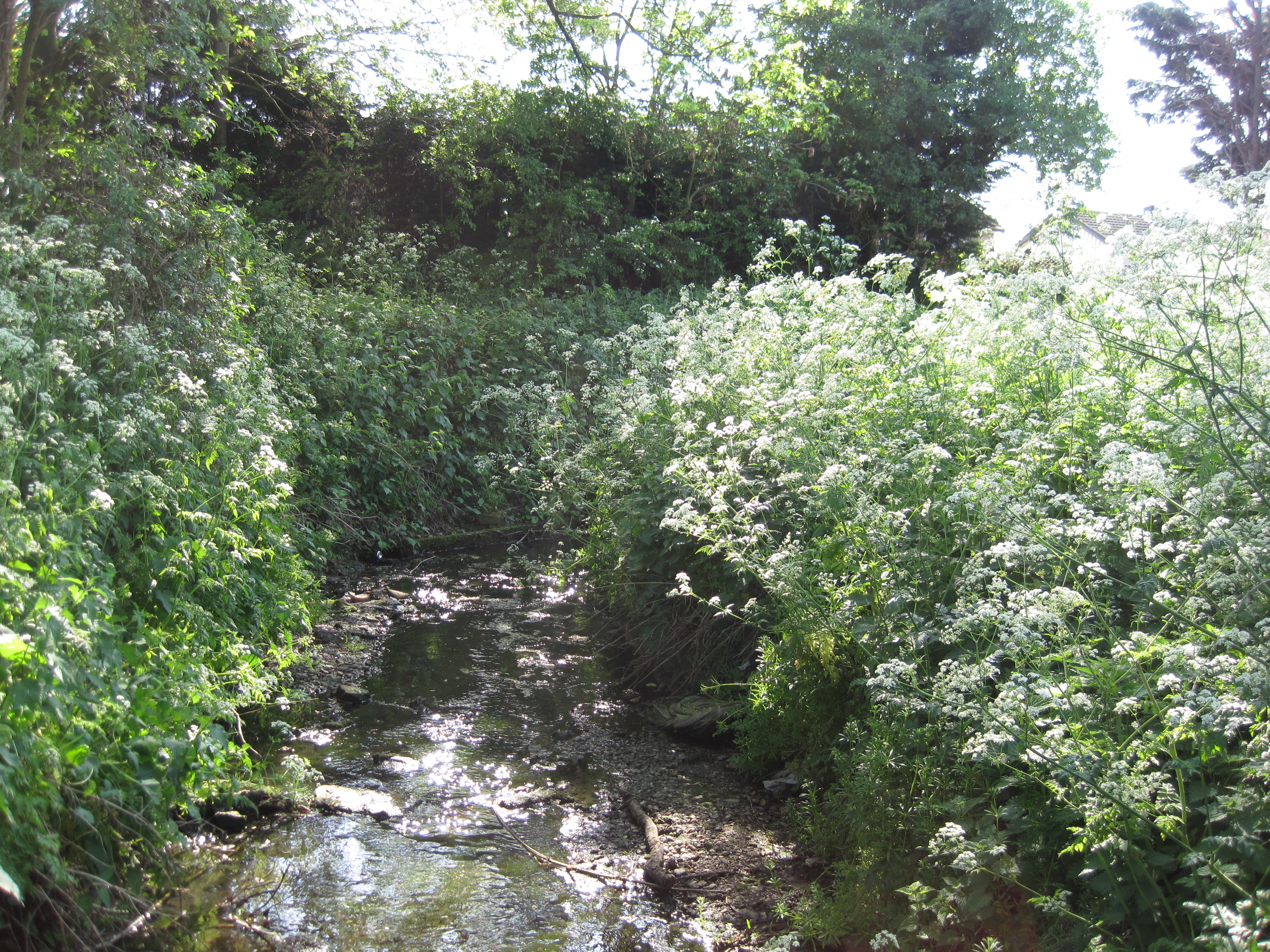
Clitterhouse Stream

Clitterhouse Recreation Ground or Clitterhouse Playing Fields is a park and Site of Local Importance for Nature Conservation in Brent Cross in the London Borough of Barnet. It is a large area of mown grass with a playground, bordered by thick hedges. Clitterhouse Stream (or Clitterhouse Brook), a tributary of the River Brent, runs along its eastern border.

The £4.5 billion Brent Cross Cricklewood development includes spending several million pounds on improving the park, including extensive landscaping, sports facilities and a nature park.

There is access to the park from Claremont Road, Prayle Grove, Purbeck Drive, Hendon Way, and by a subway from Ridge Hill.

== See also ==
- Barnet parks and open spaces
- Nature reserves in Barnet
