= Burnt Oak =

Suburb of London, England

Coordinates: 51.6032°N 0.2668°W

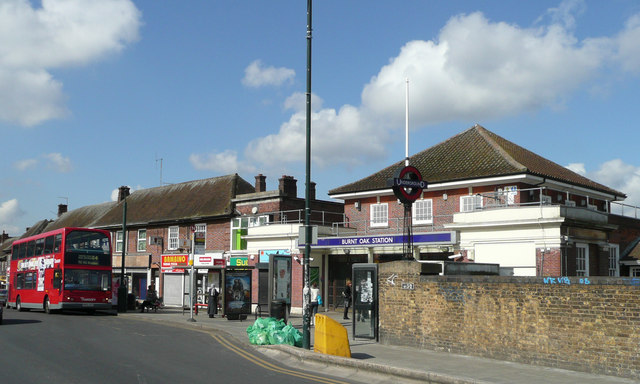
- View of Burnt Oak station and shops from Watling Avenue

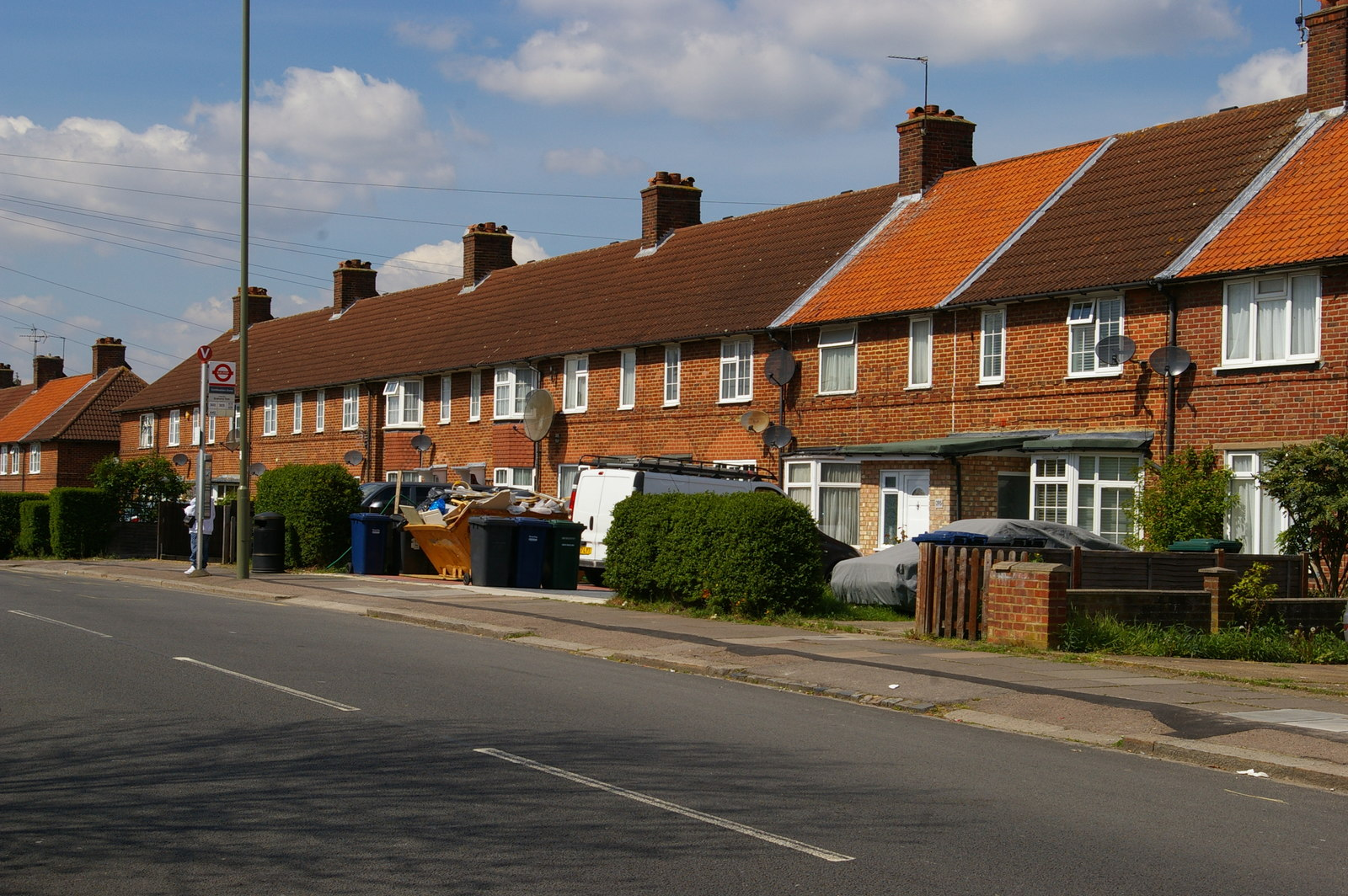
- Watling Estate terraced housing on Deansbrook Road

- Location within Greater London
- Area: 0.983 sq mi (2.55 km^{2})
- Population: 21,857 (2021 census)
  - Density: 22,237/sq mi (8,584/km^{2})
- OS grid reference: TQ205915
  - Charing Cross: 9 mi (14.5 km)
- London borough: Barnet; Brent; Harrow
- Ceremonial county: Greater London
- Region: London
- Country: England
- Sovereign state: United Kingdom
- Post town: EDGWARE
- Postcode district: HA8
- Dialling code: 020
- Police: Metropolitan
- Fire: London
- Ambulance: London
- UK Parliament: Hendon; Brent West; Harrow East
- London Assembly: Barnet and Camden; Brent and Harrow; Brent and Harrow

Burnt Oak is a suburb of London, England, located 9 miles (14 km) northwest of Charing Cross. It lies to the west of the M1 motorway between Edgware and Colindale, located predominantly in the London Borough of Barnet, with parts in the London Boroughs of Brent and Harrow. It was part of Middlesex until it was transferred to Greater London in 1965.

The area was first urbanised by and is dominated by terraced council housing constructed in the 1920s, most notably the Watling Estate. A multi-ethnic suburb since the late 20th century with vibrant shopping parades and international grocers, Burnt Oak has attracted a significant Romanian community since the 2007 EU enlargement, becoming known by locals as "Little Bucharest" or "Little Romania" and its name Romanianised by the diaspora as Bontoc.

== History ==
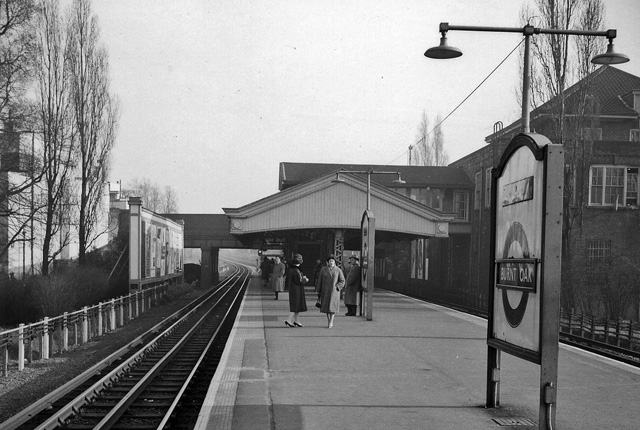
Burnt Oak tube station in 1961

The earliest recorded use of the name Burnt Oak was in 1754, when it was used to refer to a field on the eastern side of Edgware Road (Watling Street) in the Ancient Parish of Hendon. The name originates from the fact that the field had contained an ancient oak tree some time before the 1750s, having been burned by a lightning strike. The tree stood at the boundary of the Little Stanmore parish with the Kingsbury parish. (Note: However, most of what is now Burnt Oak was known as Sheves Hill until the opening of the Hendon Union Workhouse, when it became known as Red Hill (or Redhill). In 1924 the area's tube station opened under the name Burnt Oak (for Watling), cementing its current name to distance it from the workhouse's reputation.)

Parts of modern-day Burnt Oak lie on what was once a 33-acre field known as Sheves Hill Common Field. However, outside of Sheves Hill, most areas of farmland had been owned by the Goldbeaters Farm since the 14th century. The Goldbeaters estate may have originated in a grant of land and rent by John le Bret to William of Aldenham, goldbeater of London, in 1308. John Goldbeater held a house and some land of the manor of Hendon in 1321. This land had been cultivated for hay and became enclosed by the late 1500s. A known custom from the area from the early 19th century had been established by hay farmers, who would assemble at the Bald Faced Stag pub and lead a procession to London. By the 1840s, two other notable farms existed in the area, known as Burntoak Farm and Redhill Farm, both also producing hay alongside being used as livery stables.

In the 19th century, Sheves Hill field was rented out in divisions of land to 46 tenants, and later became the site of the Hendon Union Workhouse, commonly known as Redhill Workhouse, in 1838. The institution housed around 130 inmates in 1863, and was governed by Rev. Theodore Williams, Vicar of Hendon, who developed a reputation for cruelty toward inmates. The infirmary of the workhouse is now the site of Edgware Community Hospital.

In May 1844, Burnt Oak field was sold to a Mr Essex. A union school for 150 children was built next to the workhouse in 1859. A farmhouse and cow farm existed to the south, which were still maintained into the early 1920s. In 1853, three residential streets: North Road, East Road, and South Road were built on the site of Burnt Oak field by the Middlesex Freehold Land Society. The application of the field name to the district followed from this new estate by the initiative of the land society, as the name Redhill had become associated with the ill-famed workhouse. The new name, Burnt Oak, was in use by the 1880s and first appeared on maps in 1895. However, the area continued to be referred to as Red Hill until the opening of Burnt Oak tube station, with a Redhill Drive still existing in the area.

Similarly, an area known as Orange Hill existed closer to the outskirts of Mill Hill, giving its name to Orange Hill Road. This area took its name from Orange Hill House, which in turn was possibly named to celebrate the accession of William of Orange in 1689. The building which now stands at the site, once the site of St Rose's Convent, was built in 1881 for a Mr Ruddock.

The area was largely rural, having few buildings except for pubs such as the Bald Faced Stag, Royal Oak, Prince of Wales, and Load of Hay, which catered to travellers. However, there were a handful of shops by the 1890s; a post office and grocery run by George and William Plumb, a bakery run by Caller & Poole, as well as James Huggett the greengrocer. A new school had been opened in 1884, later being replaced by a larger school housing up to 300 students in 1901. The Metropolitan Electric Tramway along Edgware Road to Cricklewood opened in 1905, but the population remained small, being around 1,000 in 1921.

Burnt Oak would begin to become urbanised after Burnt Oak (for Watling) station on London Underground's Northern line opened on 27 October 1924. Plans to open the tube station had existed since 1913, but were postponed due to the First World War; initially proposed names differed, including Sheves Hill, Orange Hill, and Goldbeaters. The station was first open on weekdays with a small booking hall suitable for a rural area. The Underground Electric Railways Company of London constructed a new road, Watling Avenue, known as Mill Hill Avenue until 1927. This was to link to Edgware Road, and originally for transporting soil and materials for the construction of the tube station. At 100 Watling Avenue, the first remotely controlled electrical substation in the country was constructed, which was able to power the railway line while being controlled remotely from Golders Green. It was the country's largest automatic substation at the time of its construction and the first to be purpose-built for a railway. The building, designed in a similar art deco style to much the 1920s–1930s buildings along Burnt Oak's main parades, is disused but still stands today as of the year of its centenary.

Also in 1924, it was announced that the London County Council was to build a housing estate (Watling Estate), which was ready for its first occupants in April 1927. The estate offered three main styles of houses, made of brick, wood, and steel, as well as newly constructed flats. Other housing estates were opened on former farmland, such as the Canada Park Estate and Highlands Estate. In 1927, Redhill Hospital was also opened near the Union Workhouse. With this and other new amenities the area was provided with a new station by 1928, and the population by 1931 had grown to 21,545. A shop parade was built along Watling Avenue in 1930, as well as a number of new schools to serve the area, such as Woodcroft and Goldbeaters.

Most of the residents who migrated to Burnt Oak when the area became urbanised in the 1920s came from the overcrowded working-class districts of Islington and St Pancras. This led to discontent among some long-time residents, who accused the working class of pick-pocketing and possible Communist sentiments, giving the area the nickname "Little Moscow". This led to some shop owners denying service to those who lived on the estates. However, the Watling Centre, established in 1933, provided facilities and entertainment to the local population. On 29 June 1936, the Regent Cinema was opened on Burnt Oak Broadway, later becoming known as the Odeon Cinema and Savoy Cinema. From 1961, the building housed Mecca Bingo, London's first bingo club. The club closed in 2014, with the building becoming derelict and, as of 2021, is set to be transformed into apartments.

Similarly to neighbouring Hendon and Grahame Park, Burnt Oak's history was associated with early aviation. The area was once the site of the Stag Lane Aerodrome, where pioneering pilot Amy Johnson had learned to fly. In July 1921, aviation pioneer Harry Hawker died after crashing in a park in Burnt Oak. Stag Lane was also the site of the de Havilland aircraft works, which employed a significant number of residents in the area. London's RAF Museum is located nearby in Grahame Park, on the site of the former Hendon Airfield.

In September 1931 Jack Cohen opened the first Tesco store at 54 Watling Avenue, Burnt Oak. The store was later moved to a larger plot at 9 Watling Avenue, with a second store opening on Burnt Oak Broadway in 1976. The Watling Avenue store closed in the 1990s, while the Burnt Oak Broadway store closed in 2018 and was set to be redeveloped into apartments. Tesco would return to Burnt Oak in 2024, opening a Tesco Express on Watling Avenue, some 200 ft away from its first-ever store.

In 1930, Dominican nuns established St Rose's Convent at Orange Hill House, which led to the foundation of St James' Catholic High School in 1934. On 31 October 1936, the Co-op opened its department store at the junction of Stag Lane and Burnt Oak Broadway. The Watling Market, consisting of a hundred covered shops and stalls, opened in December 1960 but ceased trading around 2015. In 2018, a stairwell previously used to access the marketplace was closed to the public, along with another on the opposite side which led to the derelict electrical substation.

On 9 February 1948, an Avro Anson C Mk 19 TX168 crashed when attempting to land at RAF Hendon with only one engine, as part of a crew training exercise. The aircraft crashed into buildings in Burnt Oak and a passing trolleybus. Wing Commander (33013) Theodore Urquhart Rolfe, RAF (aged 34), who was the pilot, and Flight Lieutenant (55123) William Johnstone McMeekan, RAF (aged 28) were killed in the incident. Eight passengers using the trolleybus were severely injured.

On 10 December 2014, a large fire destroyed the roof of the Lansdowne pub in Burnt Oak. The building was demolished in 2016 and is now the site of a car dealership.

In 2017, 500 people were evacuated from the area due to the eruption of a large fire behind shops in Watling Avenue.

=== Watling Estate ===
The Watling Estate is one of 12 London County Council cottage estates built between the wars to provide Homes fit for Heroes.

LCC cottage estates 1918–1939
| Estate name | Area | No of dwellings | Population 1938 | Population density |
Pre-1914
| Norbury | 11 | 218 | 867 | 19.8 per acre (49/ha) |
| Old Oak | 32 | 736 | 3519 | 23 per acre (57/ha) |
| Totterdown Fields | 39 | 1262 | — | 32.4 per acre (80/ha) |
| Tower Gardens; White Hart Lane | 98 | 783 | 5936 | 8 per acre (20/ha) |
1919–1923
| Becontree | 2770 | 25769 (Note: Source says 2589 – transcription error) | 115652 | 9.3 per acre (23/ha) |
| Bellingham | 252 | 2673 | 12004 | 10.6 per acre (26/ha) |
| Castelnau | 51 | 644 | 2851 | 12.6 per acre (31/ha) |
| Dover House Estate; Roehampton Estate | 147 | 1212 | 5383 | 8.2 per acre (20/ha) |
1924–1933
| Downham | 600 | 7096 | 30032 | 11.8 per acre (29/ha) |
| Mottingham | 202 | 2337 | 9009 | 11.6 per acre (29/ha) |
| St Helier | 825 | 9068 | 39877 | 11 per acre (27/ha) |
| Watling | 386 | 4034 | 19110 | 10.5 per acre (26/ha) |
| Wormholt | 68 | 783 | 4078 | 11.5 per acre (28/ha) |
1934–1939
| Chingford (Note: Part of a larger PRC estate around Huntsman Road) | 217 | 1540 | — | 7.1 per acre (18/ha) |
| Hanwell (Ealing) | 140 | 1587 | 6732 | 11.3 per acre (28/ha) |
| Headstone Lane | 142 | n.a | 5000 | |
| Kenmore Park | 58 | 654 | 2078 | 11.3 per acre (28/ha) |
| Thornhill (Royal Borough of Greenwich) | 21 | 380 | 1598 | 18.1 per acre (45/ha) |
| Whitefoot Lane (Downham) | 49 | n.a | n.a. | |
Source: Yelling, J. A. (1995). "Banishing London's slums: The interwar cottage estates" (PDF). Transactions. 46. London and Middlesex Archeological Society: 167–173. Quotes: Rubinstein, 1991, Just like the country.

== Geography ==
Burnt Oak is 9 miles (14 km) northwest of Charing Cross in central London. It lies about 160 (50 m) to 200 feet (60 m) above sea level. Prior to urbanisation, much of the area had been rolling grassland.

The Silk Stream, Burnt Oak Brook, and Deans Brook flow through Burnt Oak, all tributaries of the River Brent.

There are several parks in the area: Watling Park, Silkstream Park, Lyndhurst Park, Woodcroft Park, and The Meads Open Space.

== Demography and culture ==
In 2021, the Burnt Oak ward in Barnet had a population of 21,857. The census showed that 43% (9,401) of the population were White, 25.7% (5,616) were Asian, 16.5% (3,611) were Black, 2.8% (608) were Arab, 6.1% (1,326) were of mixed race/multiple backgrounds, and 5.9% (1,294) belonged to other ethnic groups. In terms of religion, 50.7% (10,285) were Christian, 21.2% (4,308) were Muslim, 7.2% (1,466) were Hindu, 2.2% (429) Buddhist, 1.3% (256) Jewish, 53 were Sikh, 1% (197) belonged to other religions, and 16.2% were irreligious.

The ward covers an area of approximately 0.983 square miles (2.55 km^{2}), giving a population density of 22,237/sq mi (8,584/km^{2}), the fourth highest in the borough behind the wards of Golders Green, Colindale South, and the highest being Colindale North, respectively.

The area is known for its variety of multicultural shops, reflecting the established Indian, Turkish and Nigerian communities. In the 2010s, the area attracted a large community of Eastern Europeans, particularly from Romania. The large size of the Romanian diaspora and its concentration in the area have earned Burnt Oak the nickname "Little Romania", or "Little Bucharest". Earlier, in the 1930s, the area was known by some as "Little Moscow" owing to rising fears of revolutionary sentiments among working-class people who arrived to settle the Watling Estate.

== Transport ==
London Buses routes 32, 114, 142, 204, 251, 292, 302 all meet at the junction of Watling Avenue, Stag Lane and Burnt Oak Broadway. The 302 route was created in 1992 when the old route 52 was split into a shorter 52 (between Willesden Junction and Victoria bus station) and new route 302 (from Mill Hill Broadway to Kensal Rise via Burnt Oak). Night bus route N5 runs between Trafalgar Square and Edgware bus station serving all the tube stations, and the N16 runs north from Victoria Station via the Edgware Road, to Edgware Station, via Burnt Oak.

Northern line trains on the Edgware Branch serve Burnt Oak tube station.

== Notable people ==
- Antony Costa (b. 1981), singer and songwriter (Blue)
- Robert Elms (b. 1959), writer and broadcaster (BBC Radio London)
- Kevin Rowland (b. 1953 in Wolverhampton), singer and musician (Dexys Midnight Runners), grew up in Burnt Oak

== Gallery ==
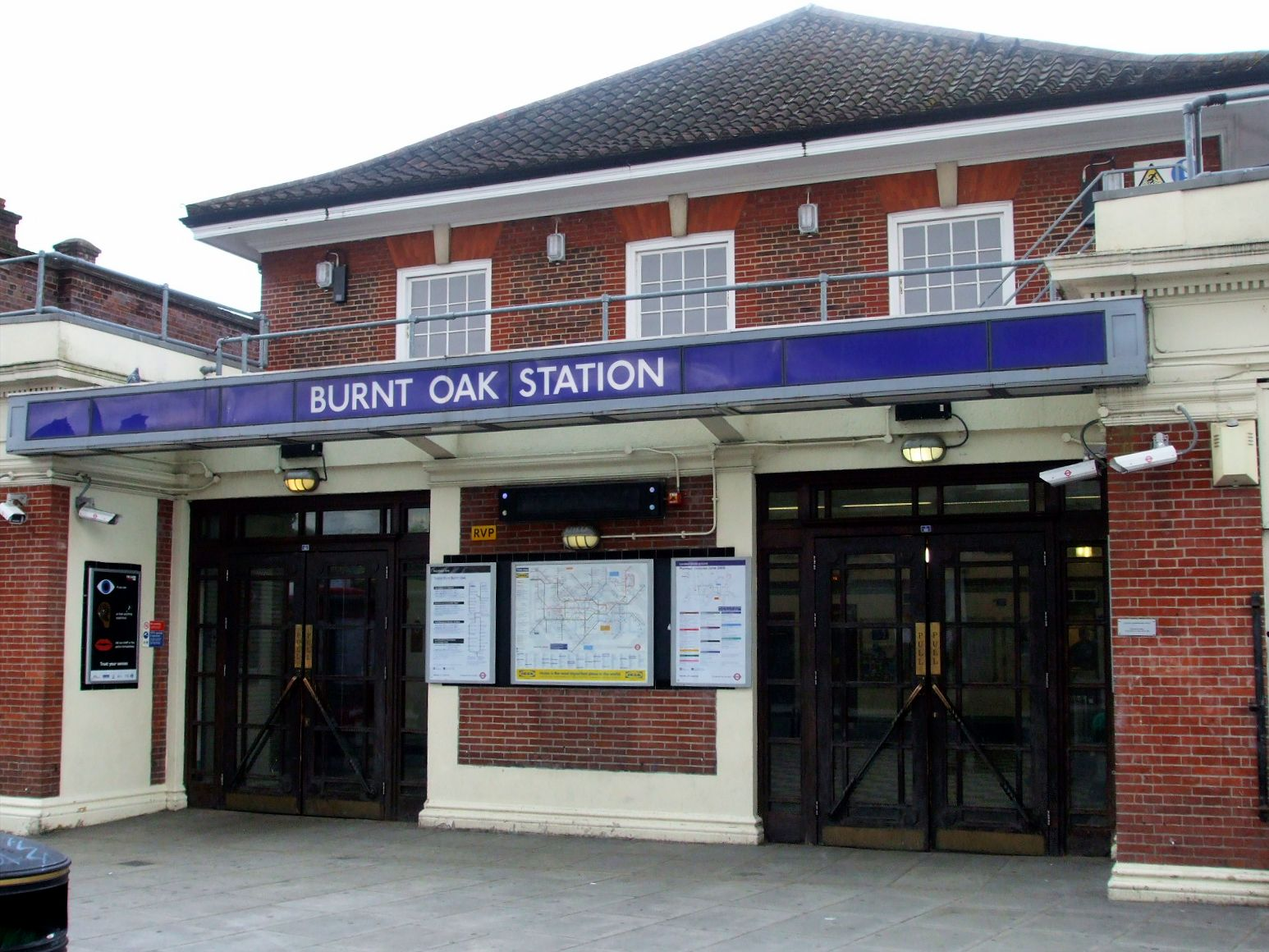
Burnt Oak tube station

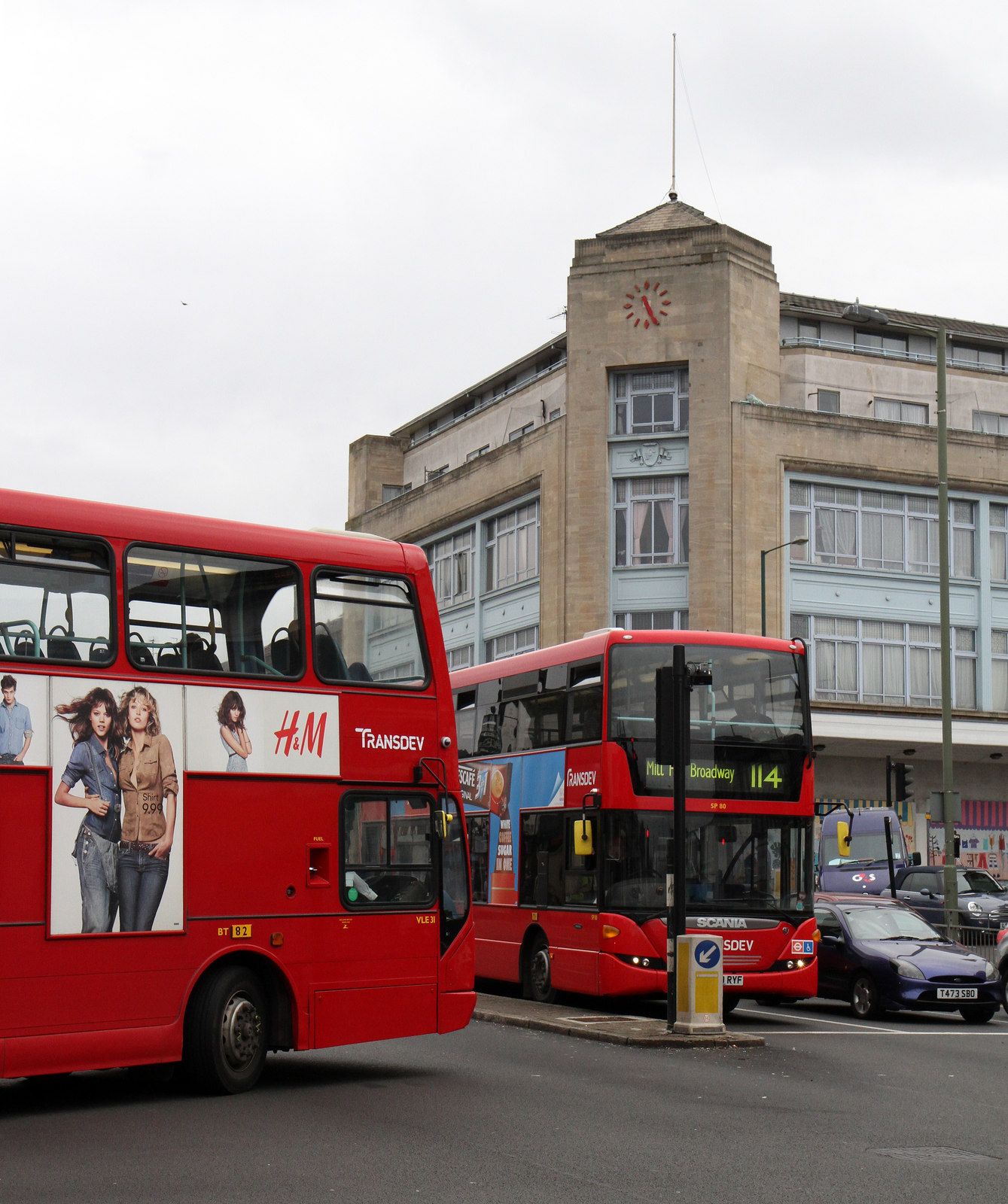
Starburn Court clock tower, former Co-op

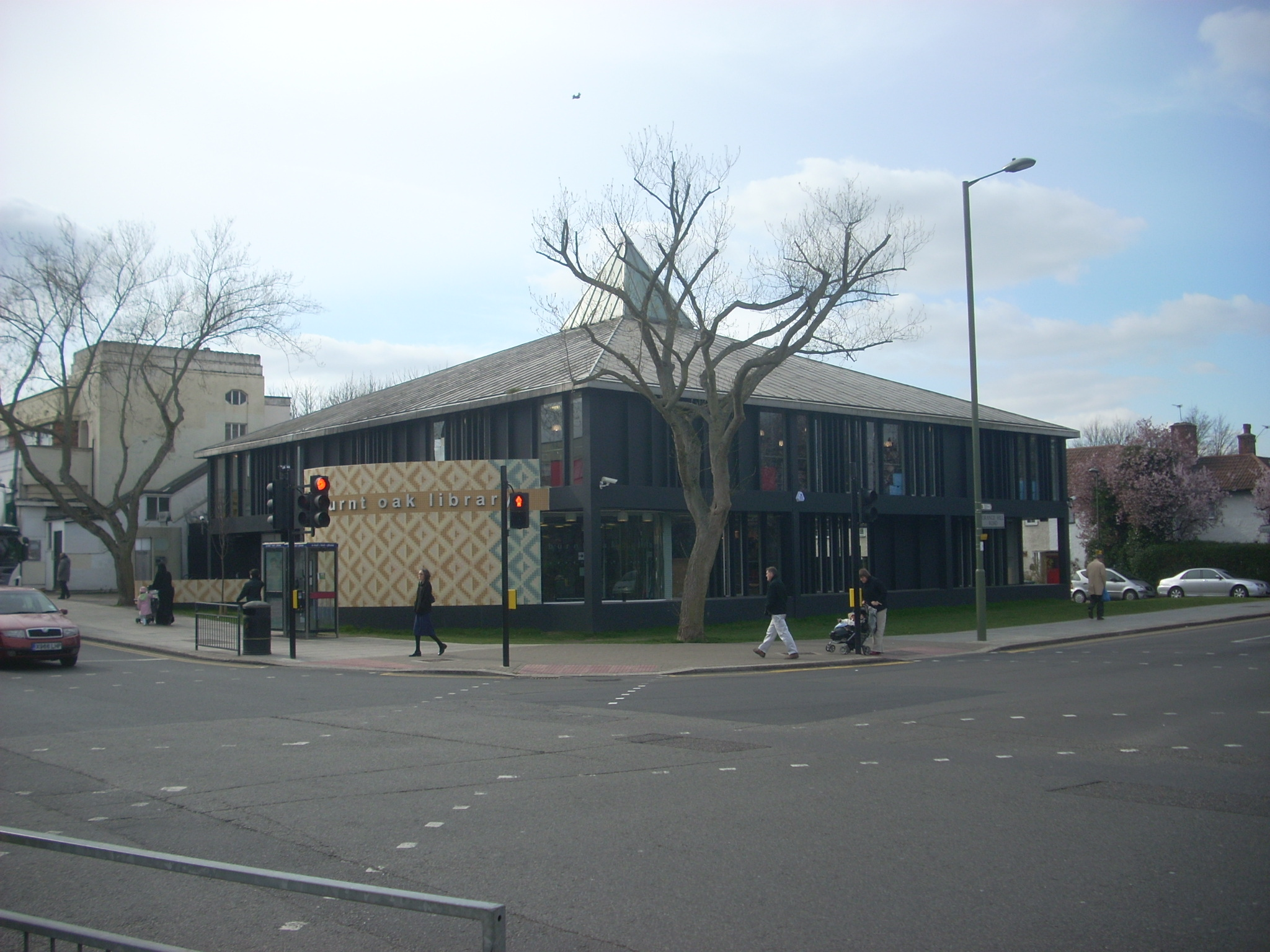
Burnt Oak Library

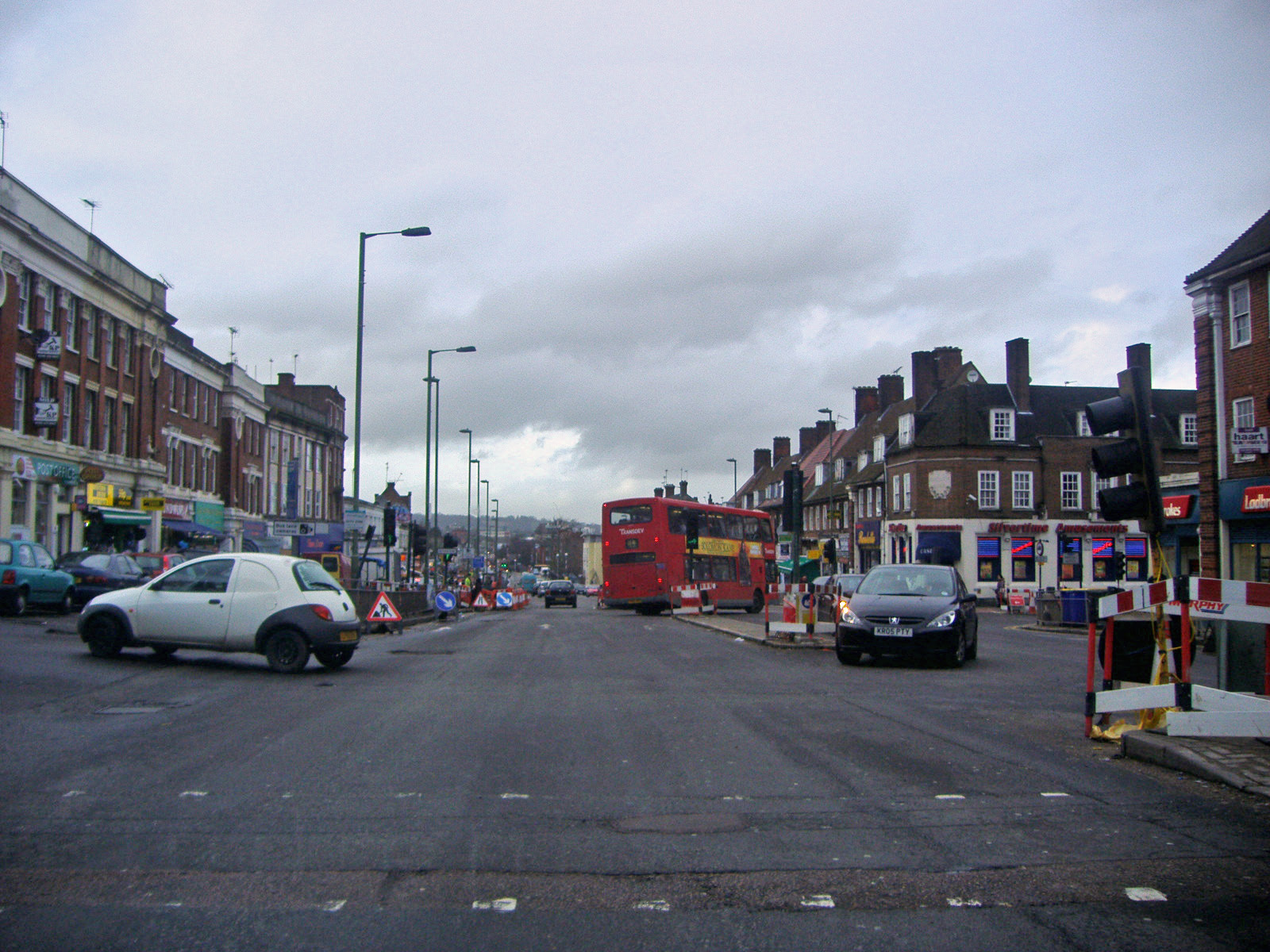
Burnt Oak Broadway

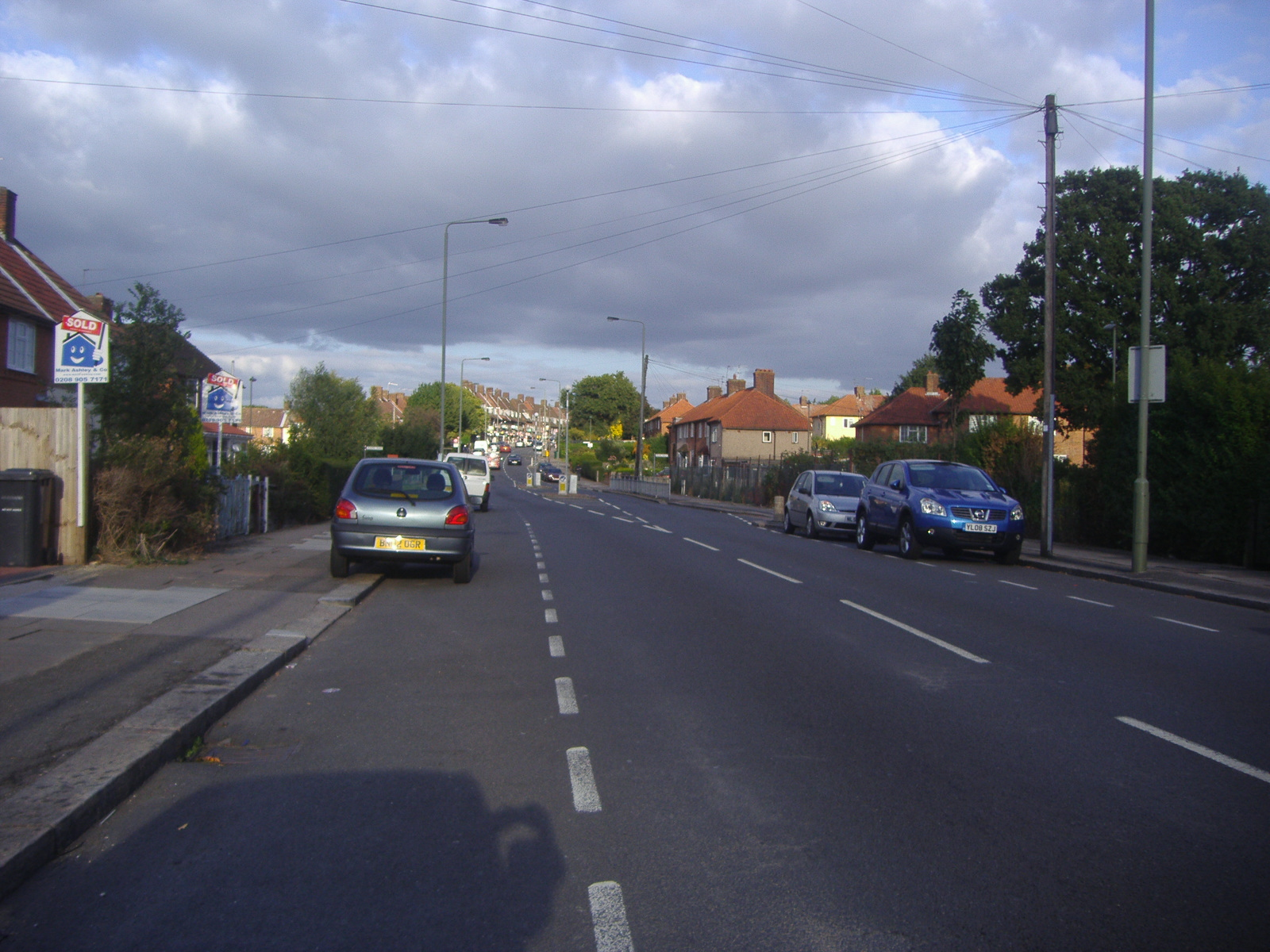
Deansbrook Road

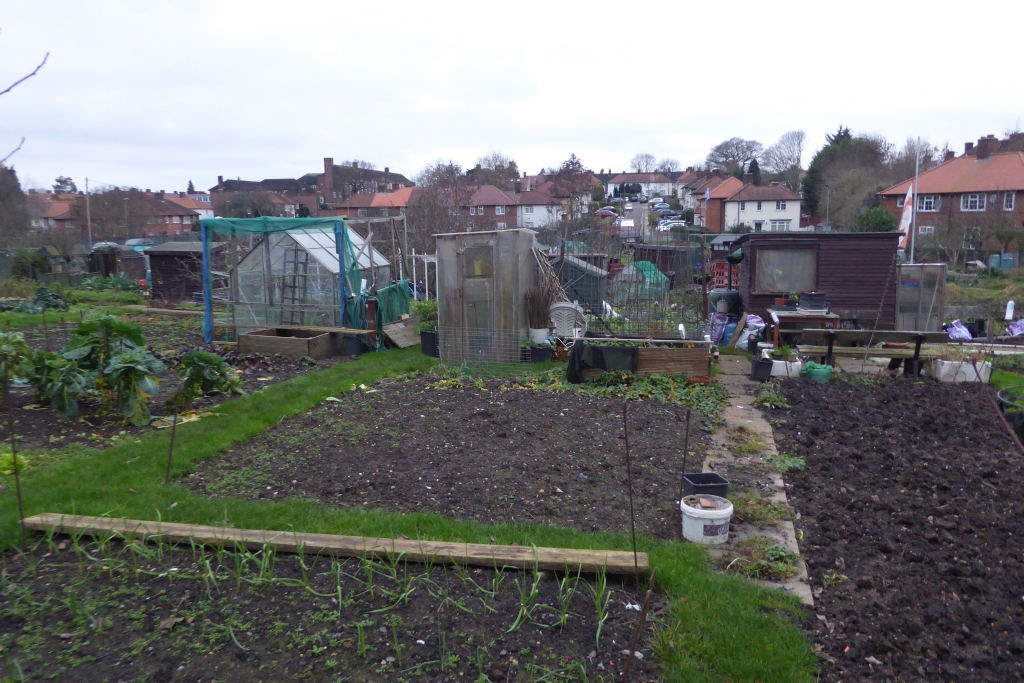
Allotments on Abbots Road

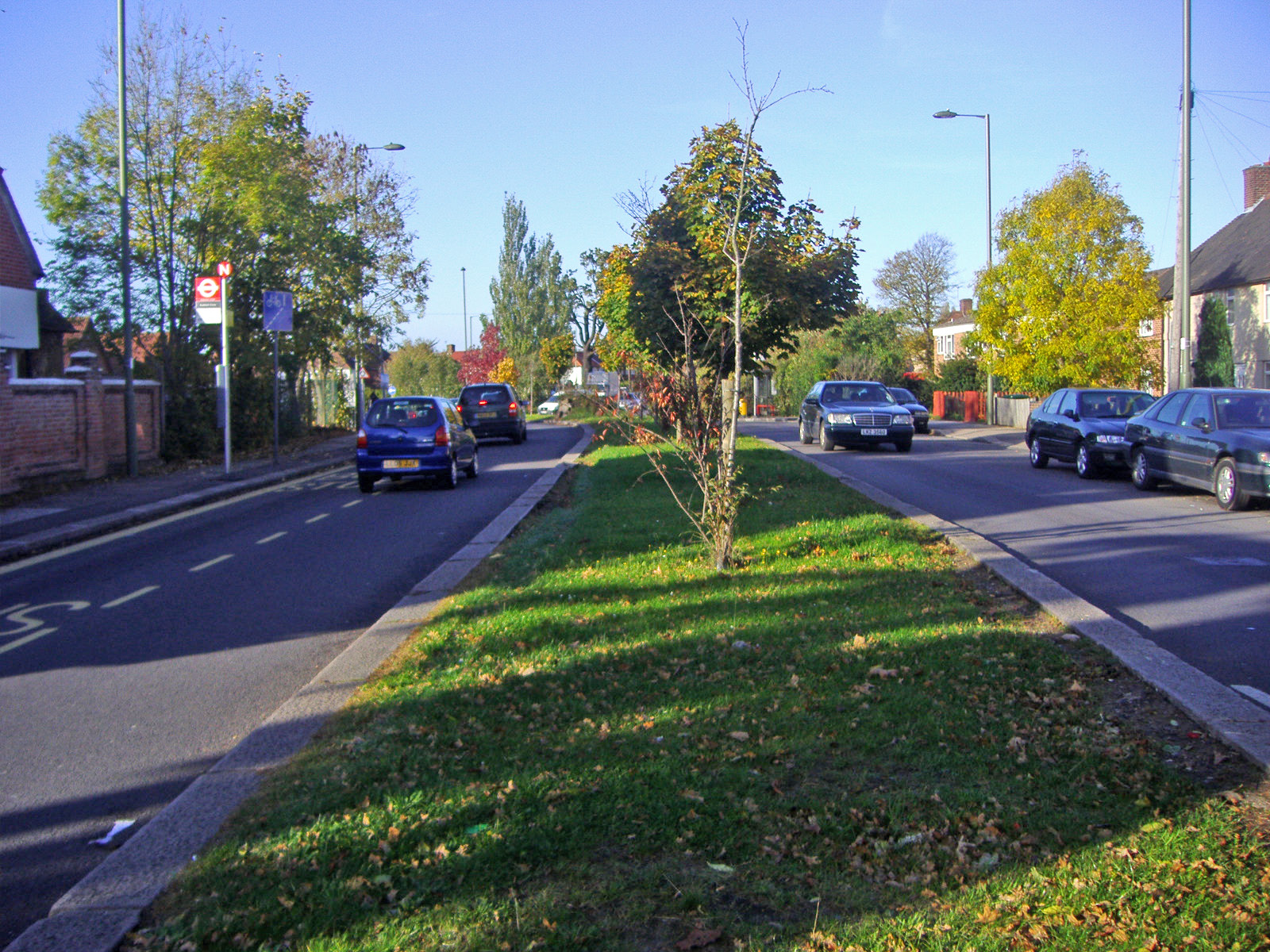
Orange Hill Road

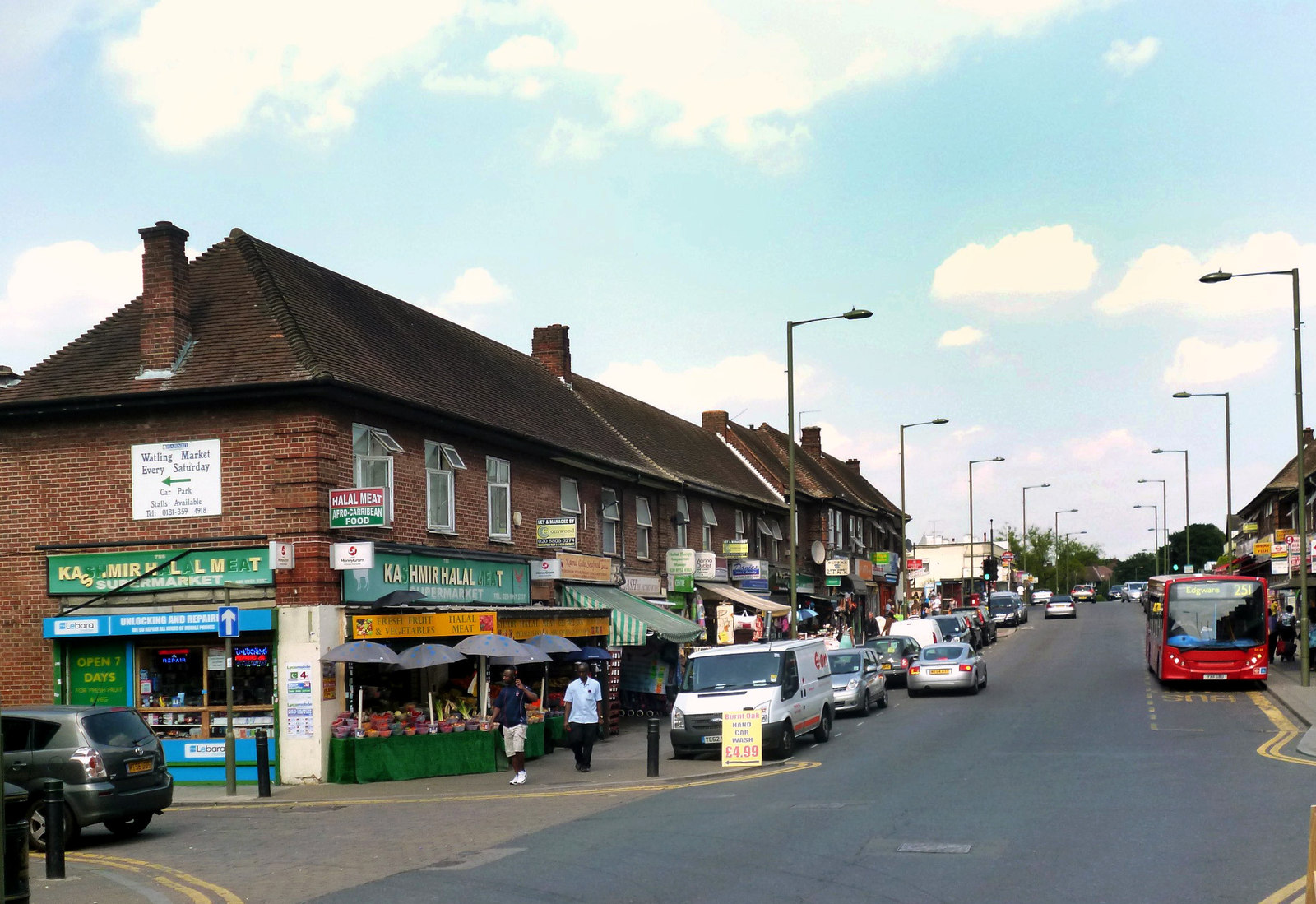
Watling Avenue

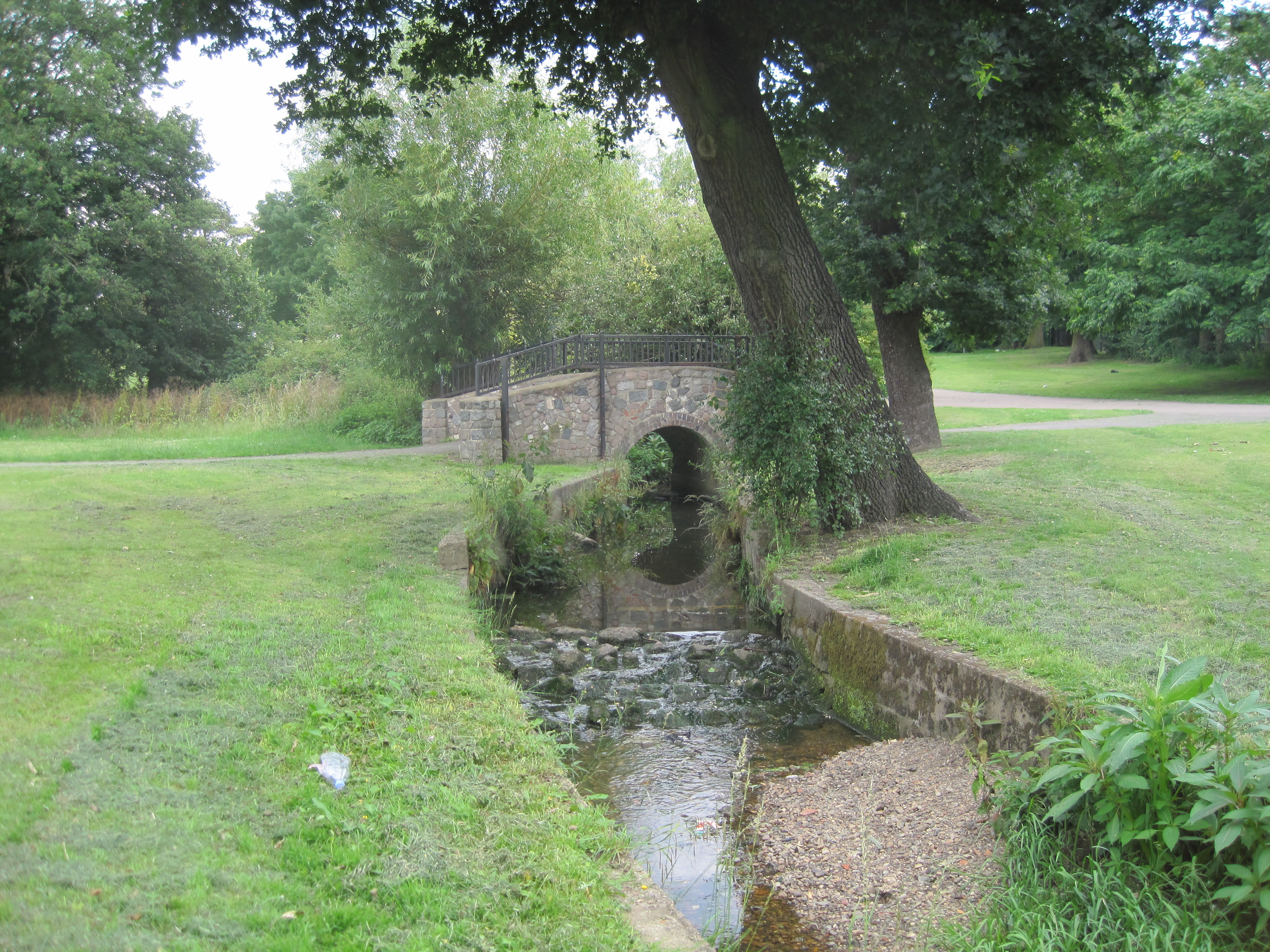
Burnt Oak Brook in Watling Park

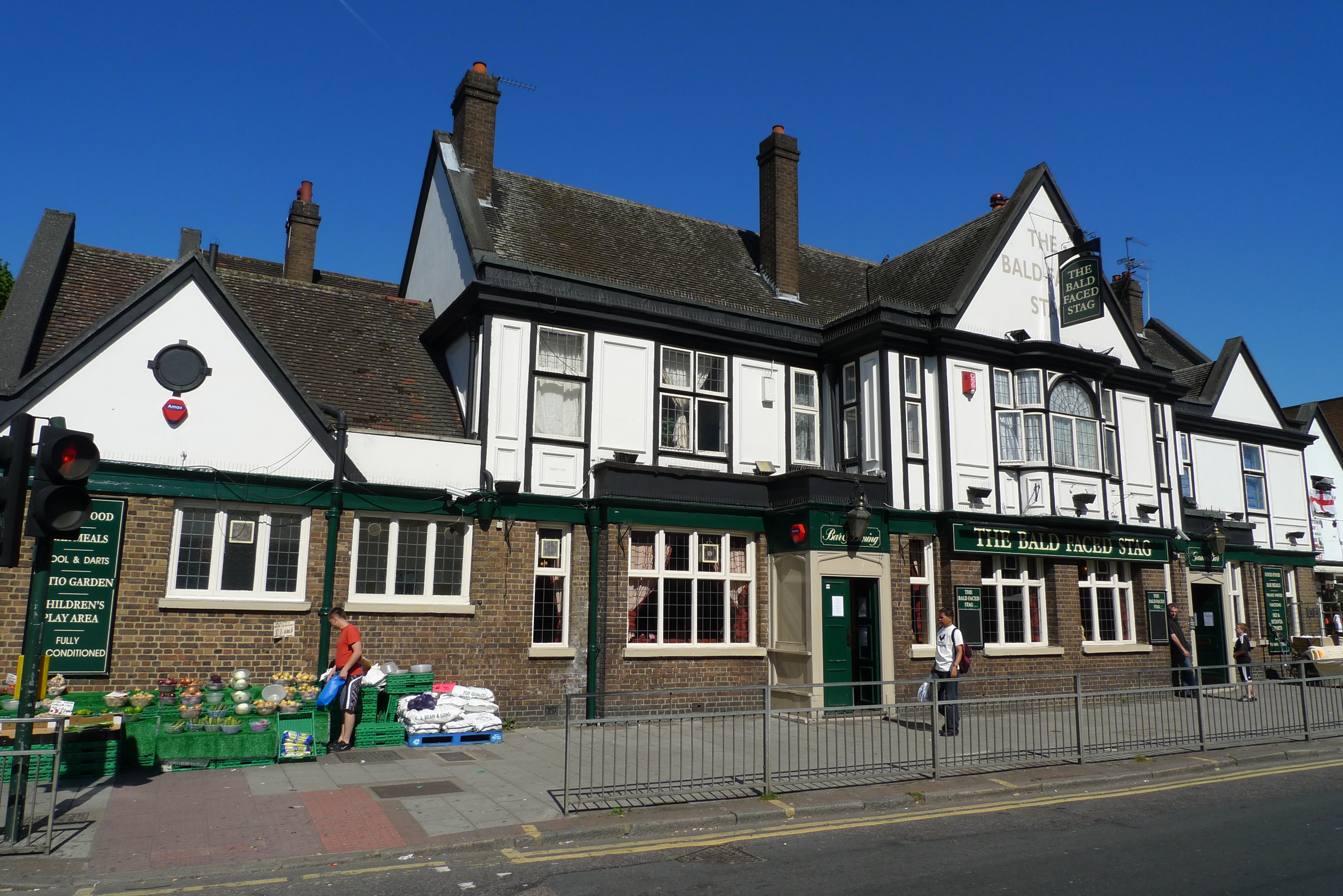
The Bald Faced Stag

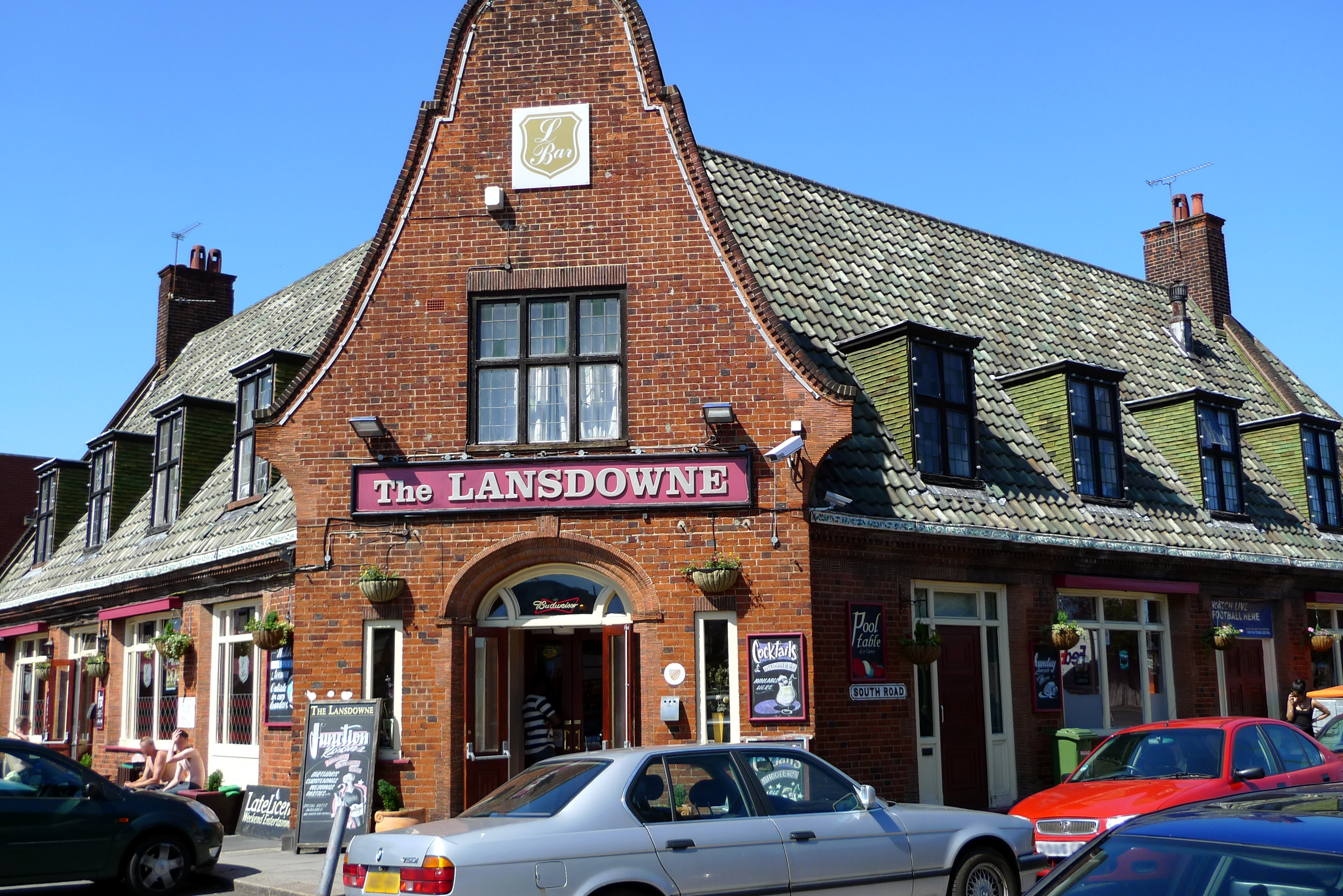
The Lansdowne

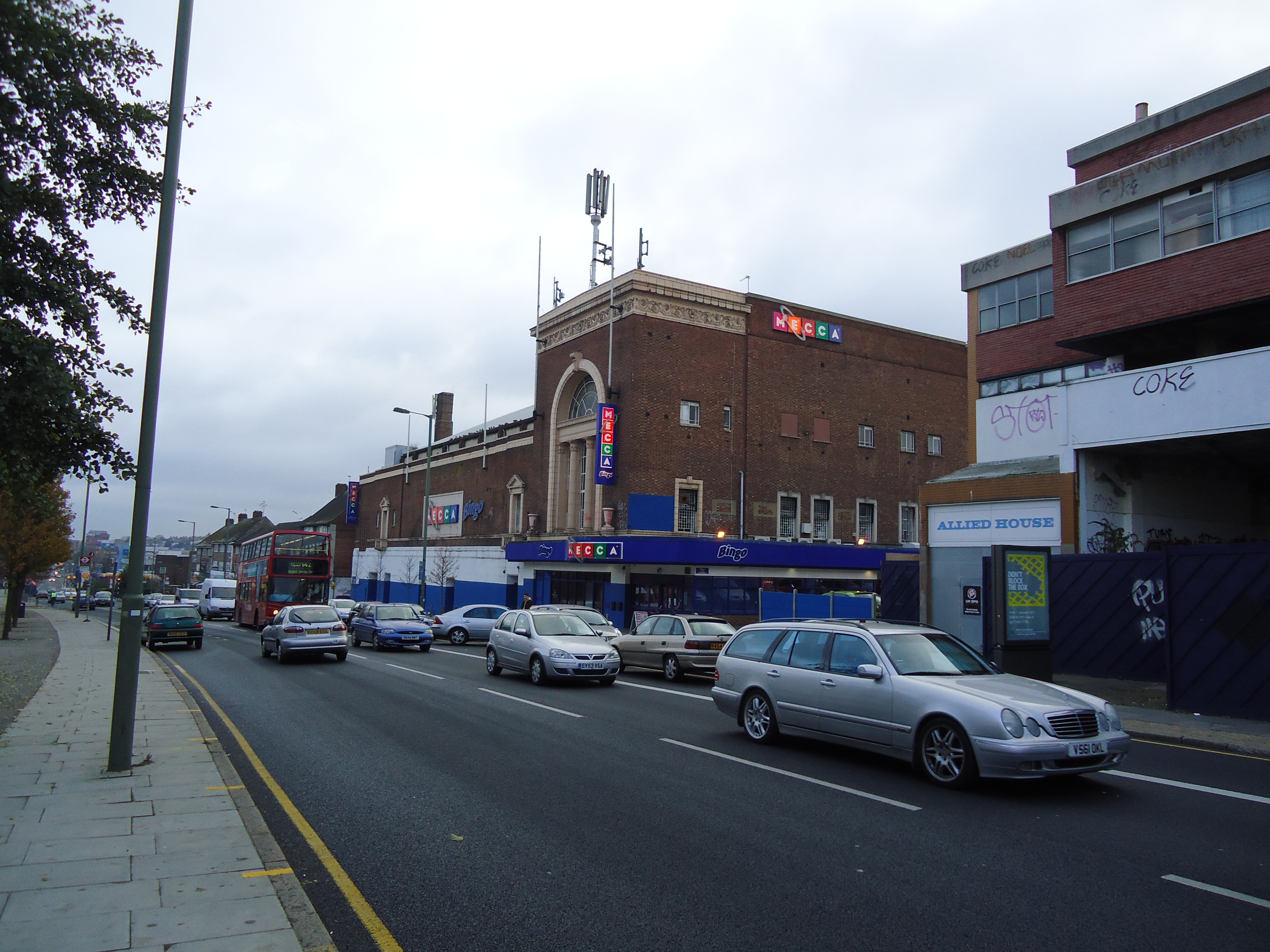
Savoy Cinema
