= Silk River =

Silk River may refer to:

- Geum River, a major river in South Korea
- Silk Stream, a waterway in London, England
