= Watling Park =

Park in Burnt Oak, London, England

Coordinates: 51.6071°N 0.2604°W

Watling Park is a public park in Burnt Oak in the London Borough of Barnet. It is one of Barnet's sixteen premier parks.

It is a hilly open area with mown grassland, a children's playground, a football pitch, a basketball pitch and a small rose garden. Burnt Oak Brook, a tributary of the Silk Stream, runs through the park. There are more natural areas of undergrowth at the borders of the park and along the banks of the brook.

The park is in the Watling Estate, a London County Council housing estate built in the 1920s and named after the nearby Roman road. It opened in 1931. The area was formerly farmland, and oak trees on the hill are survivors of its rural past.

The main entrance is at the corner of Watling Avenue and Orange Hill Road, and there is also access from Fortescue Road, Cressingham Road, Abbots Road and Colchester Road.

== Gallery ==
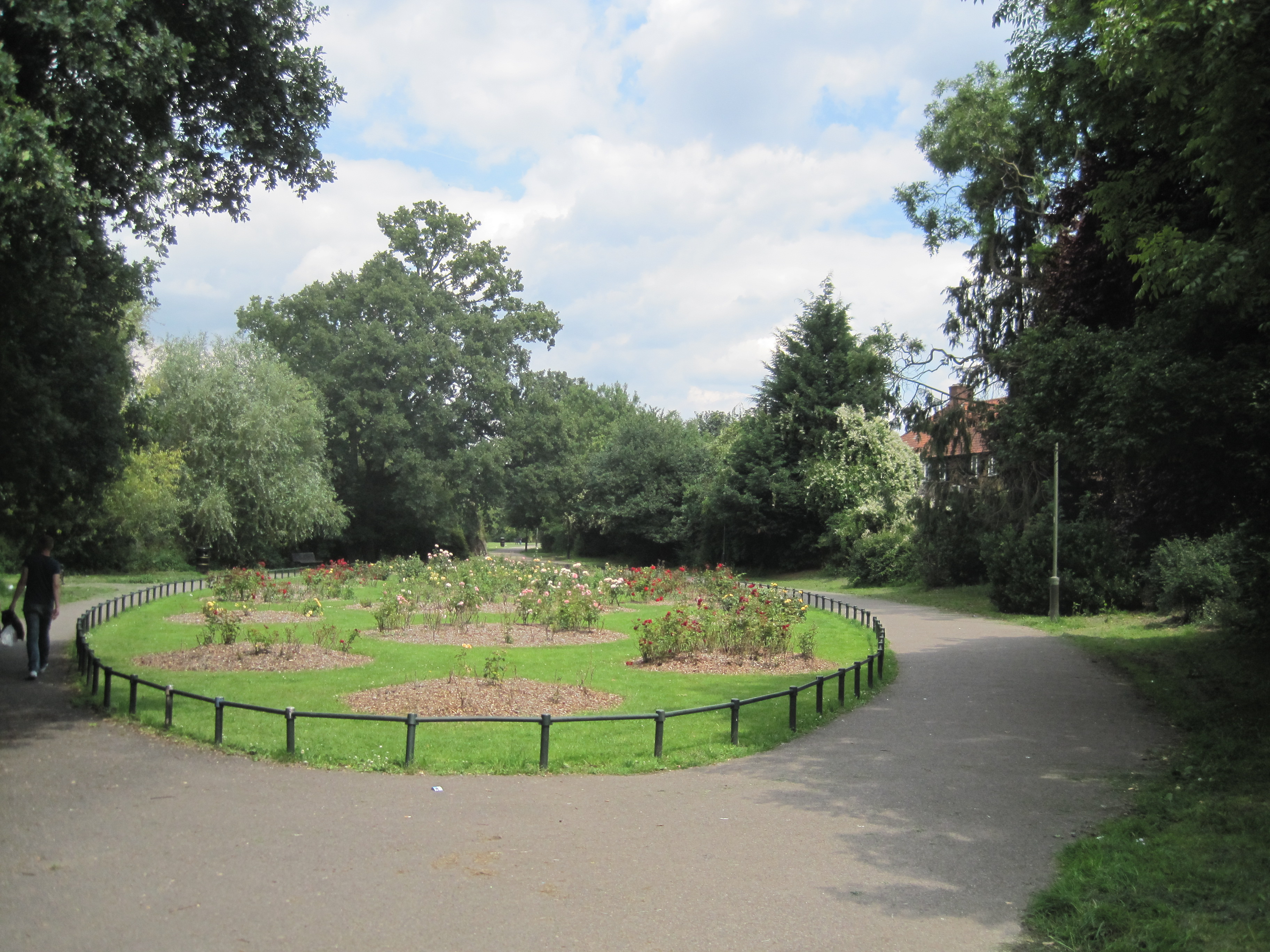
Rose Garden

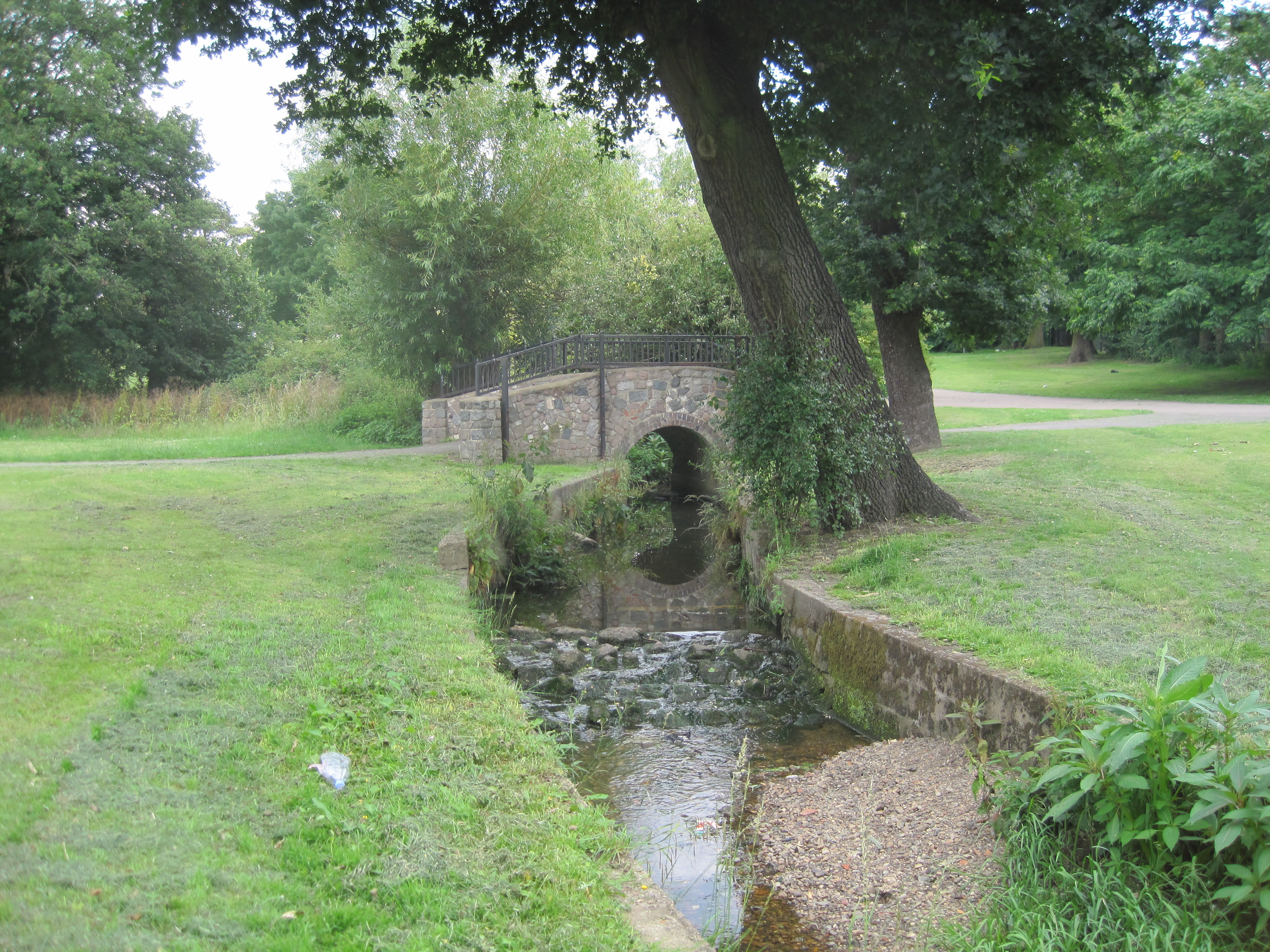
Burnt Oak Brook

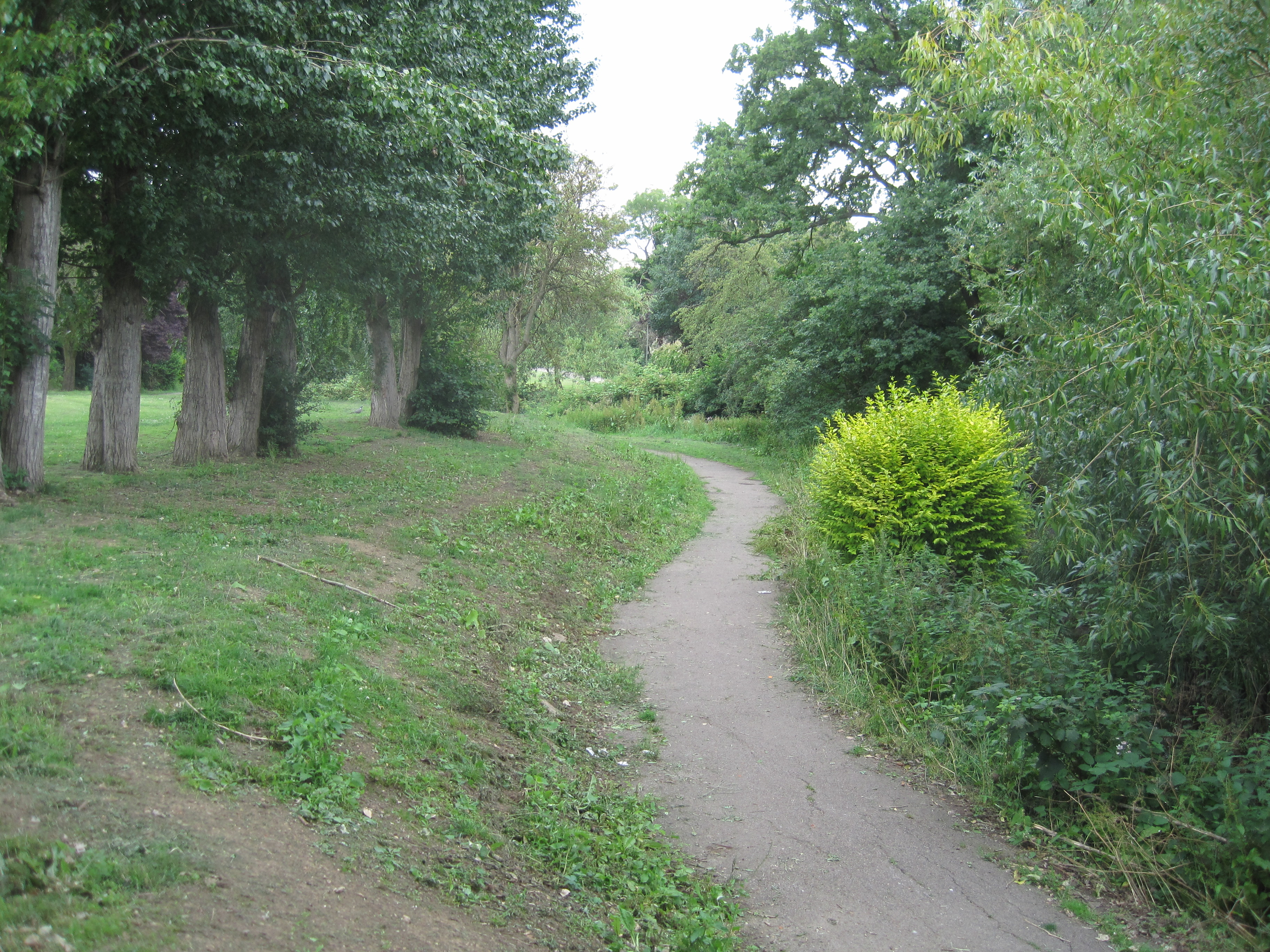
Path

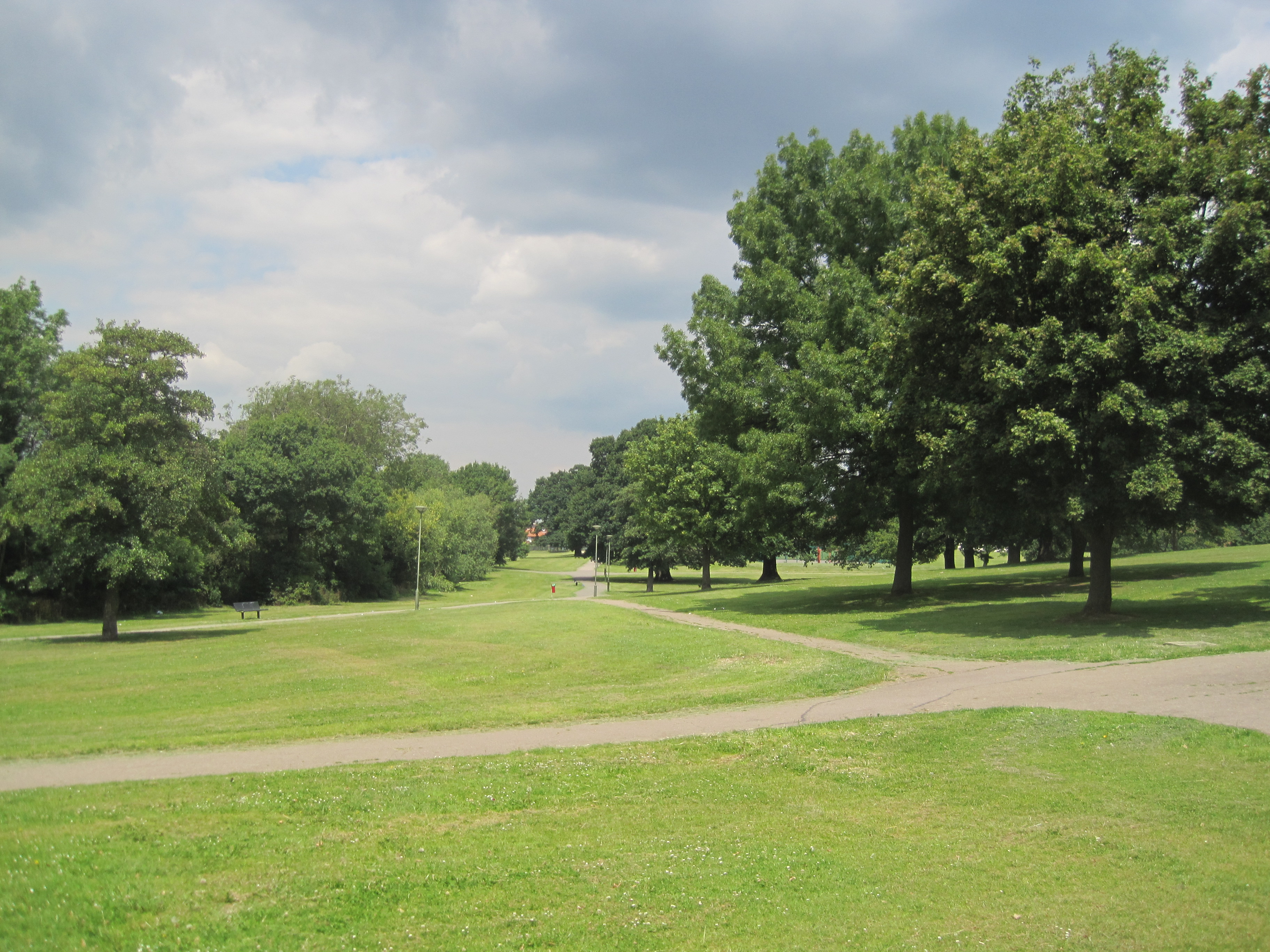
Grassland

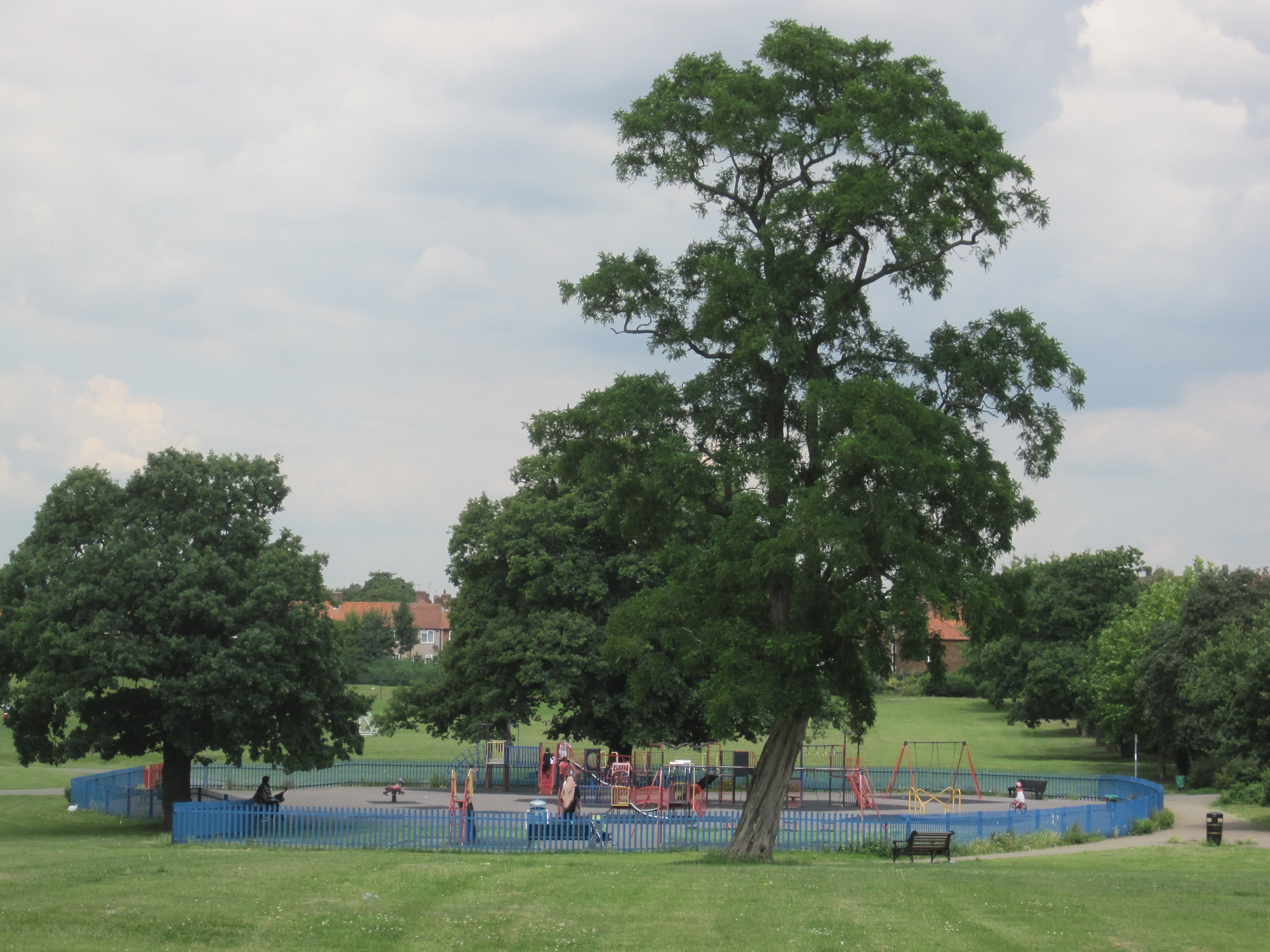
Playground

== See also ==
- Barnet parks and open spaces
