= The Mill Field =

Open space in London, England

Coordinates: 51.622°N 0.236°W

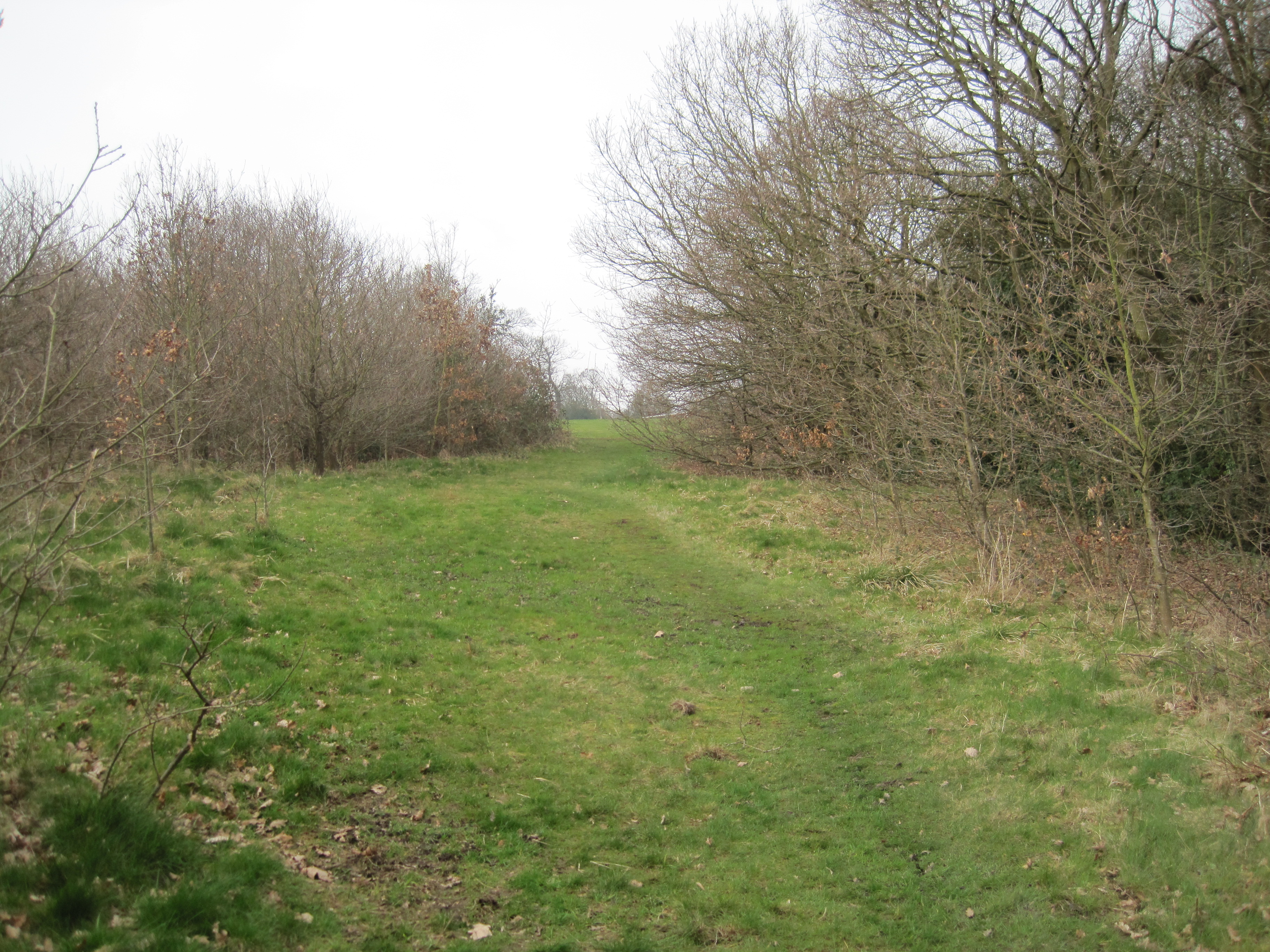
Path in The Mill Field

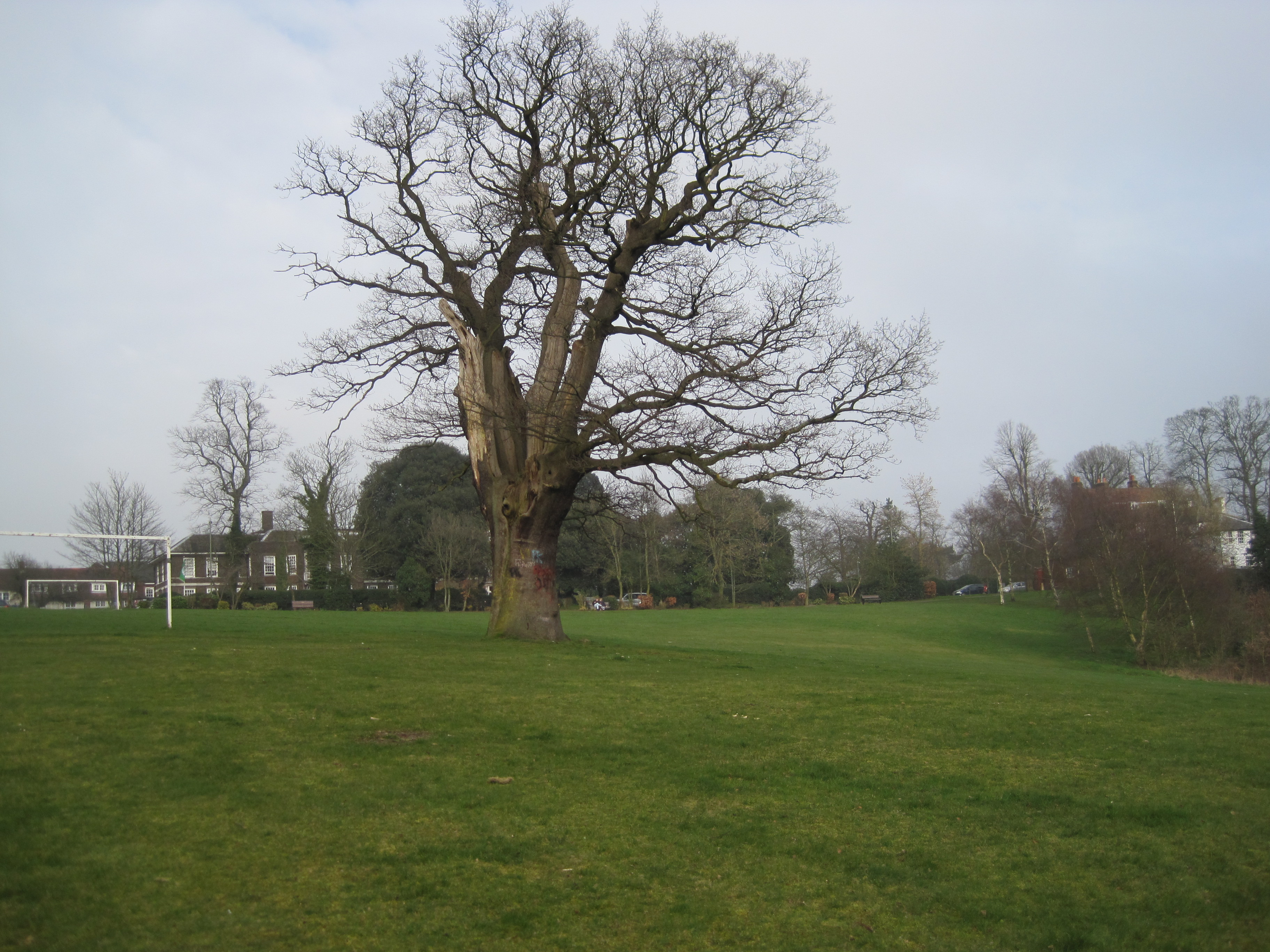
Oak tree in The Mill Field

The Mill Field is a 3.4-hectare (8.4-acre) Site of Borough Importance for Nature Conservation, Grade II, in Mill Hill in the London Borough of Barnet. It is a public open space which slopes steeply down from the road called The Ridgeway. It may be the site of the windmill which gave the area its name. This was documented as early as 1321 and had disappeared by 1754.

The upper part, which has good views across west London, is managed as a park and has a football pitch. The lower slopes are less managed, with grassland, hedgerows marking former field boundaries, scattered trees, and areas of creeping thistle. A small stream, probably a tributary of Burnt Oak Brook, flows from a spring fed pond, which has a rich wetland flora. Wild flowers include devil's-bit scabious and Common Tormentil, and the small copper butterfly is found there.

There is access from The Ridgeway near Hammers Lane.

== See also ==
- Barnet parks and open spaces
- Nature reserves in Barnet
