= Stoneyfields Park =

Public park in Barnet, London, England

Coordinates: 51.6247°N 0.2629°W

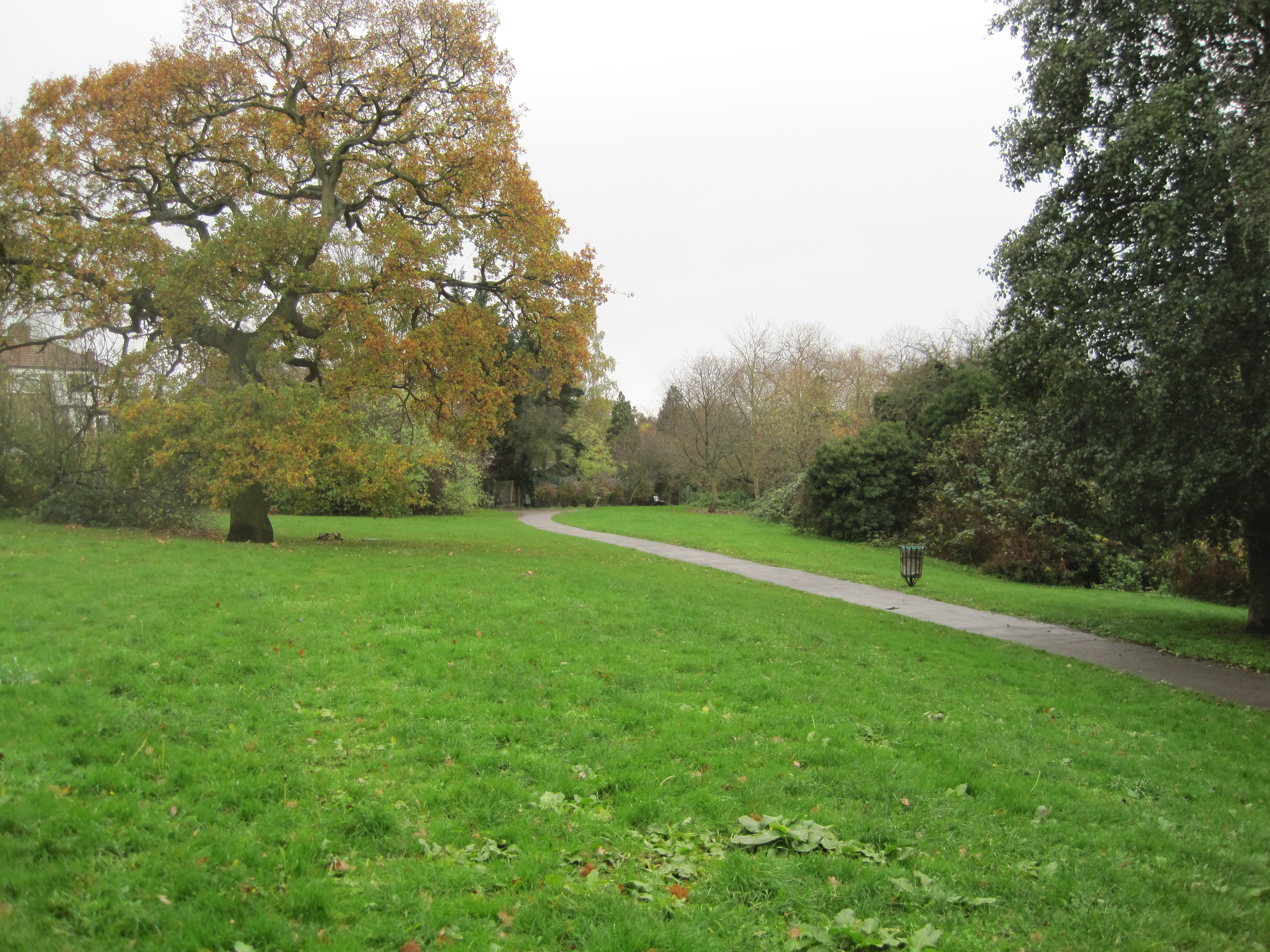
Grassland at Stoneyfields Park

Stoneyfields Park is a three-hectare public park in The Hale in the London Borough of Barnet.

The park is mainly a grassland area with a small wood, hedgerows, and two play areas. Deans Brook, which crosses the park, has been dammed to create an ornamental lake. The lake has a fringe of vegetation dominated by great and lesser reedmace. Coots, moorhens and mallards breed on the lake, and it also supports amphibians and dragonflies.

The woodland of oak and hazel is clearly old, as are some of the hedges, and there are plants indicative of ancient woodland, such as wood-sedge. Parts of the grassland are herb rich, with wild flowers such as cuckooflower.

There is access to the park from Edgware Way, Fairmead Crescent and Riverdene, in addition to an alleyway under the railway and motorway from The Fairway in Mill Hill.

Stoneyfields Park and Deans Brook are a Site of Borough Importance for Nature Conservation, Grade II.

== Gallery ==
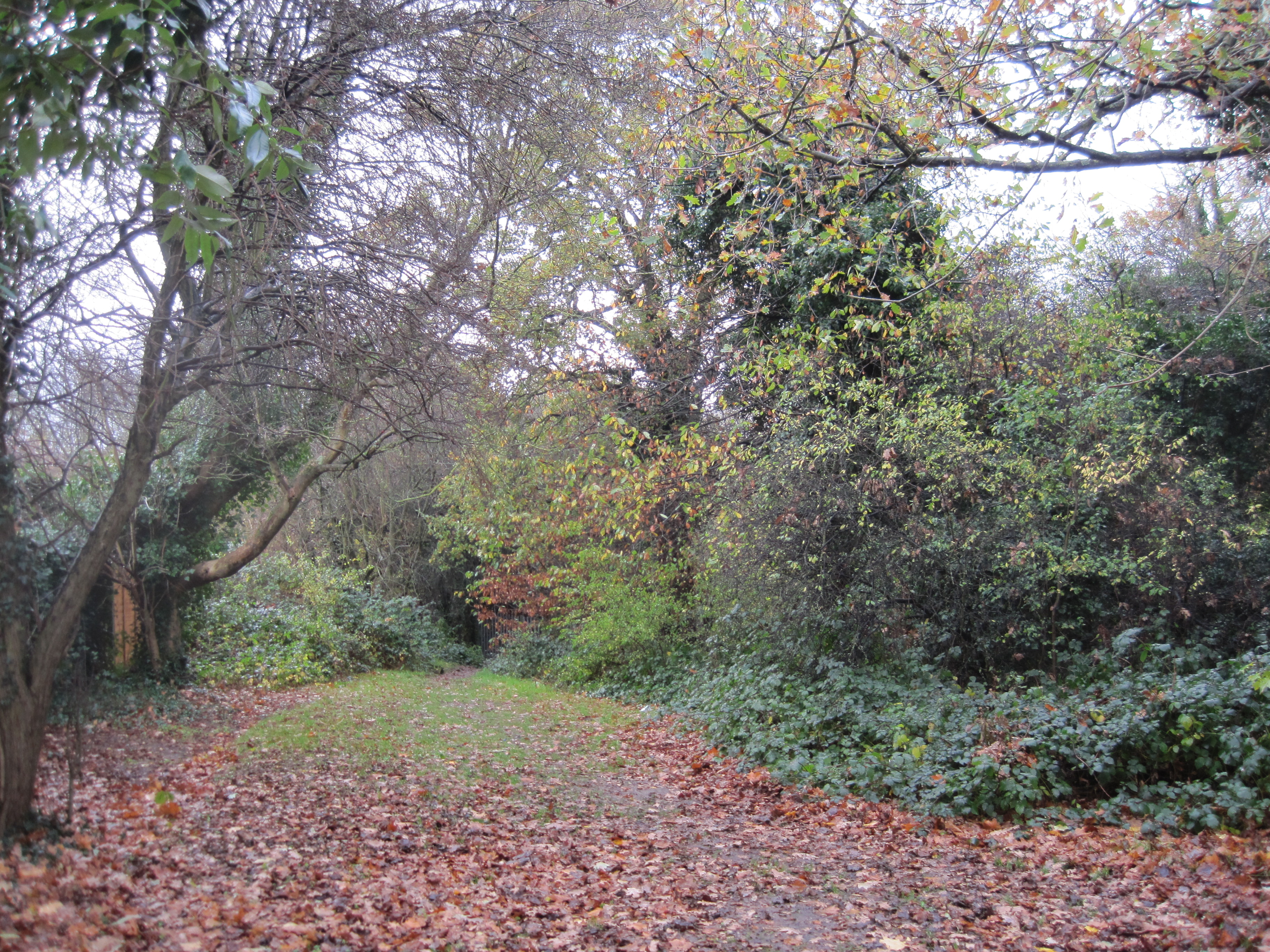
Wood

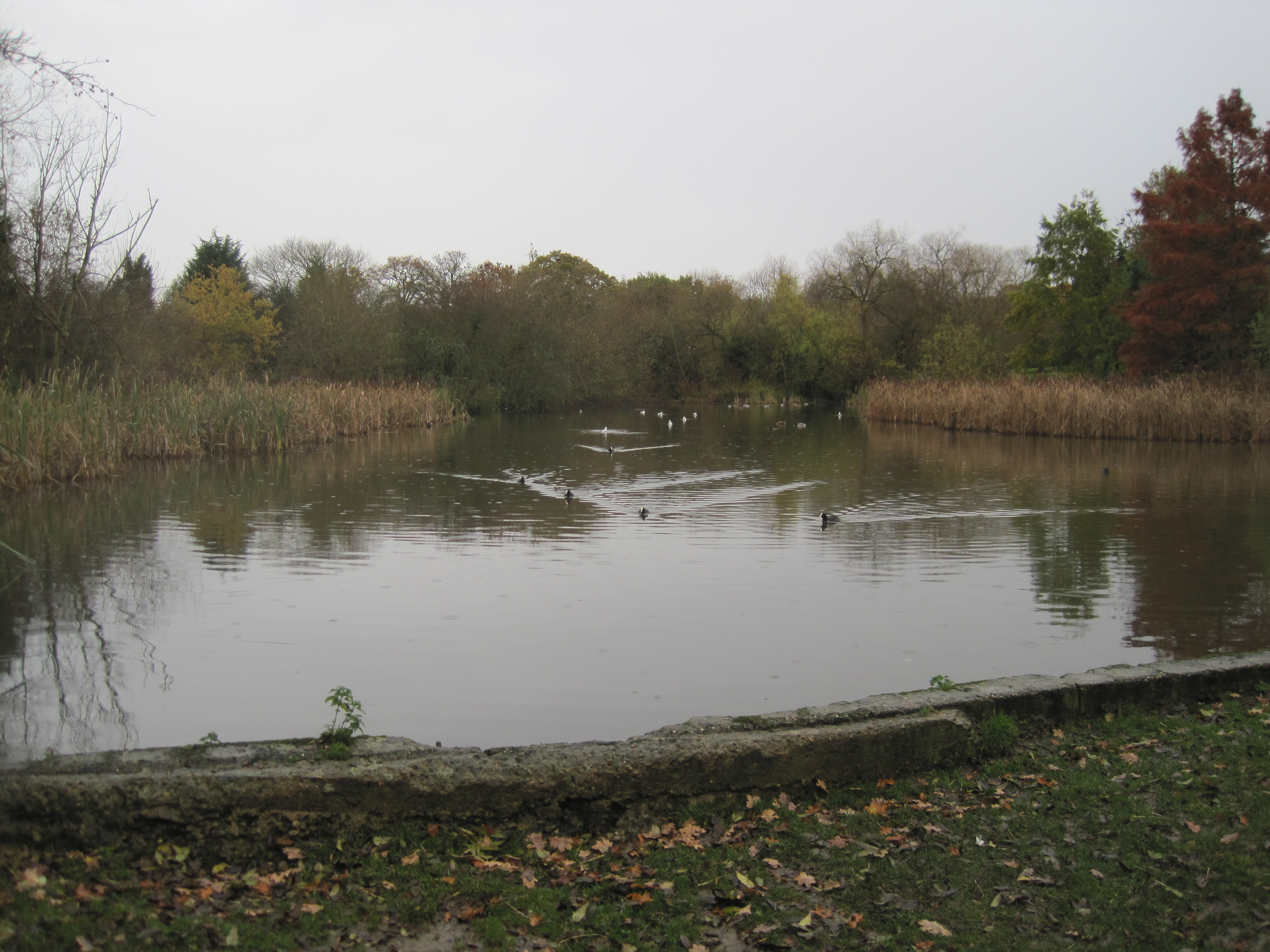
Lake

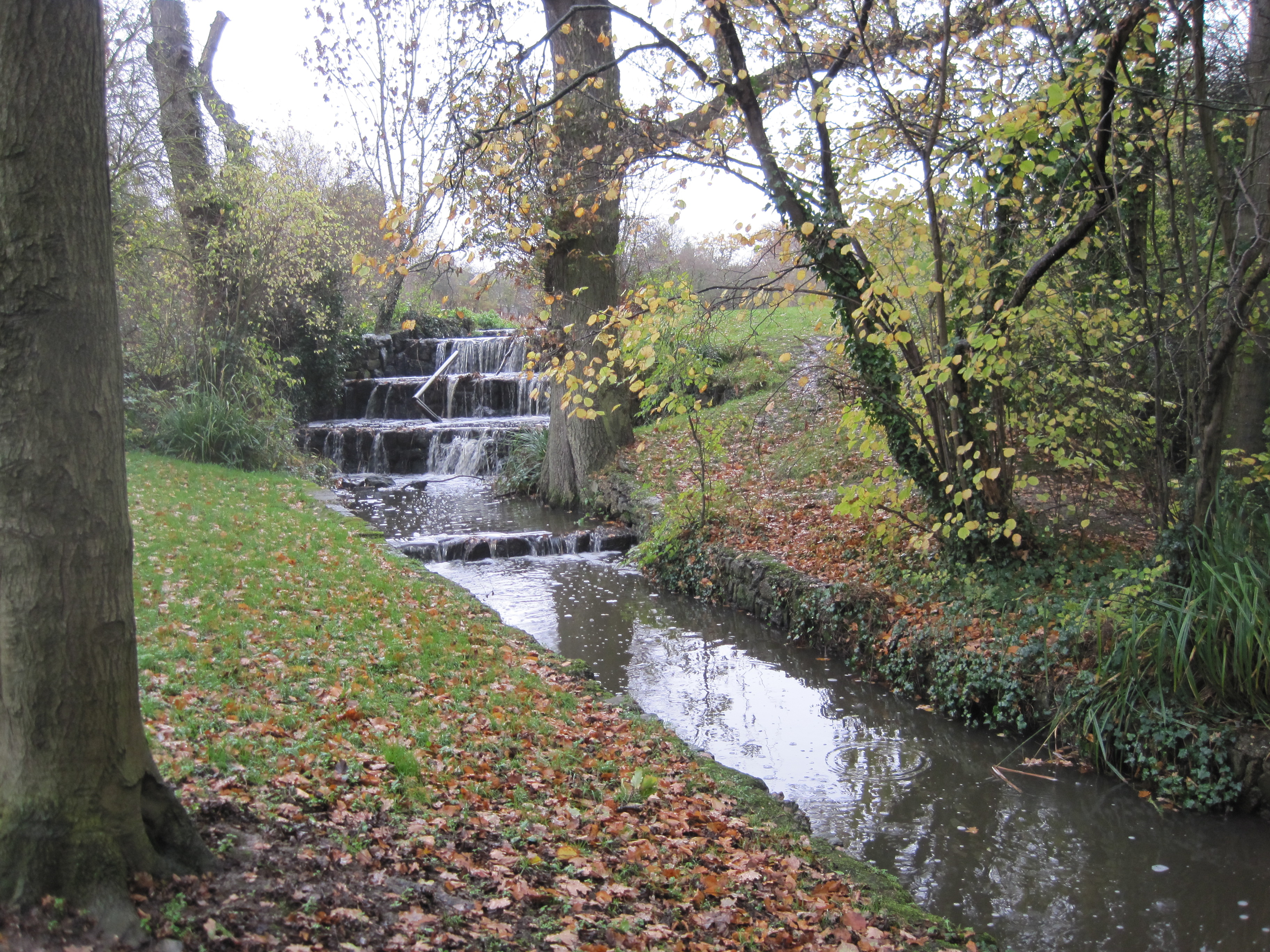
Dam

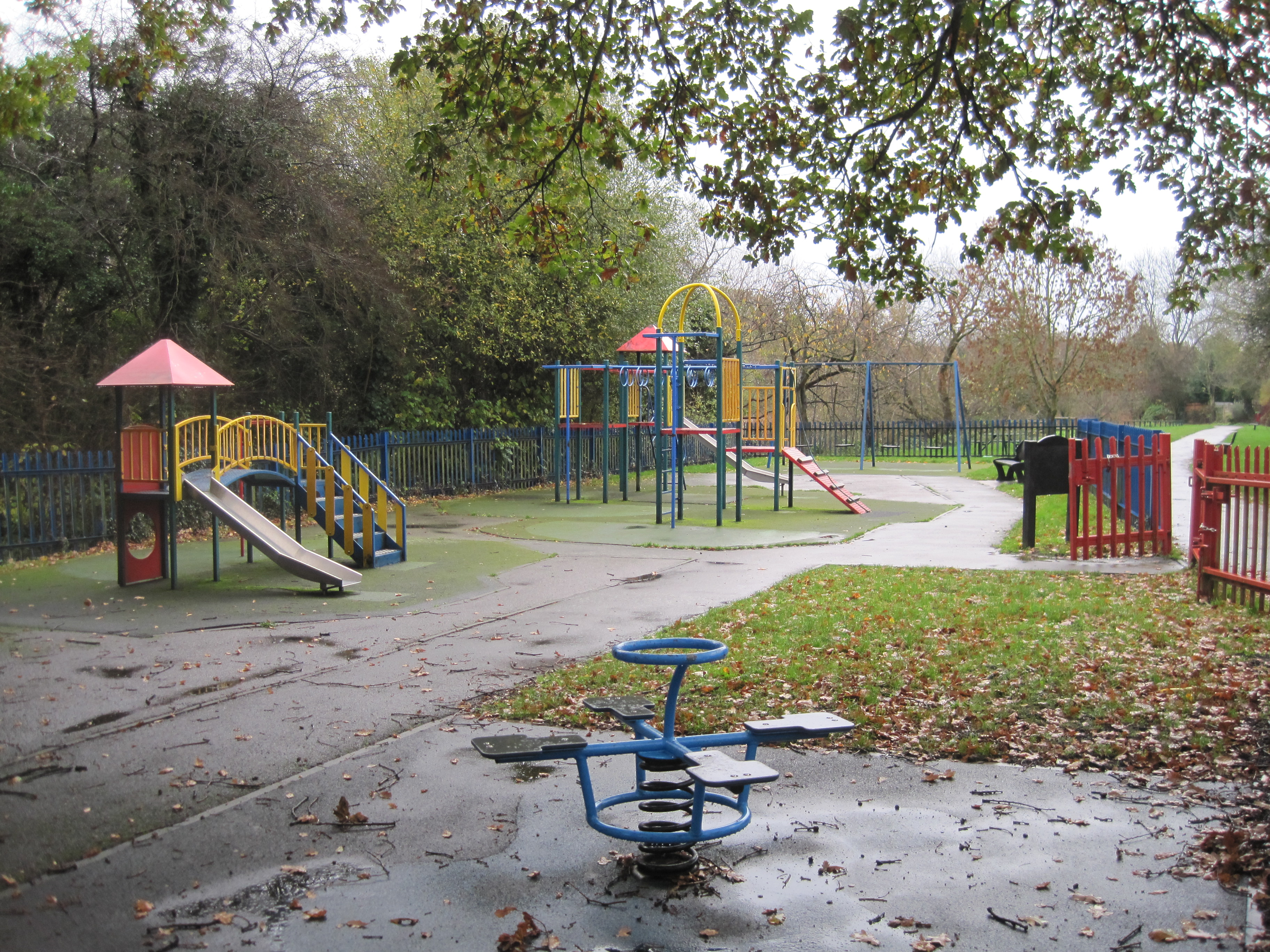
Play area

== See also ==
- Barnet parks and open spaces
- Nature reserves in Barnet
