= Burnt Oak Brook =

Stream in the London Borough of Barnet

Coordinates: 51.6082°N 0.2620°W

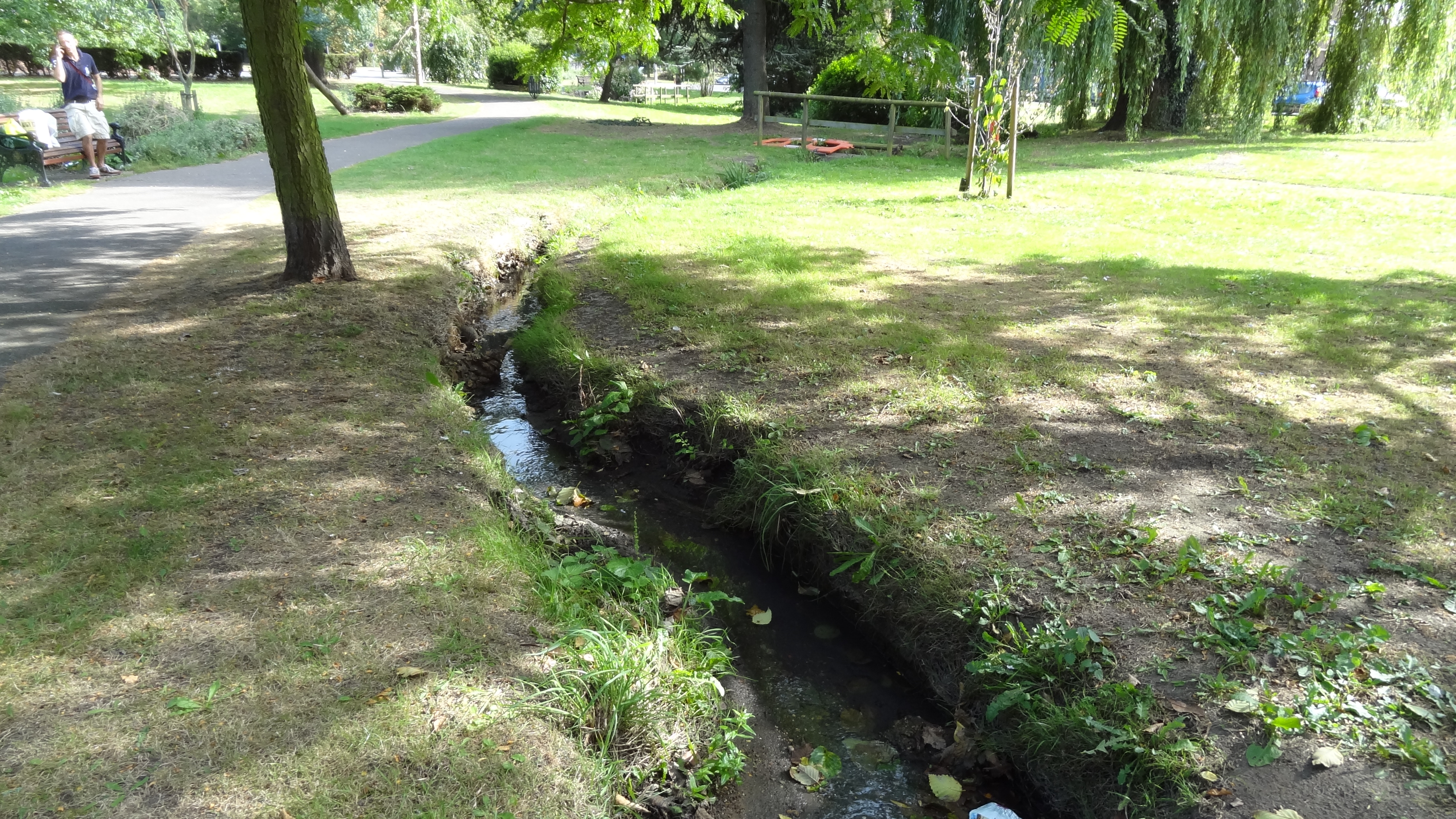
Burnt Oak Brook in Simmonds Mead

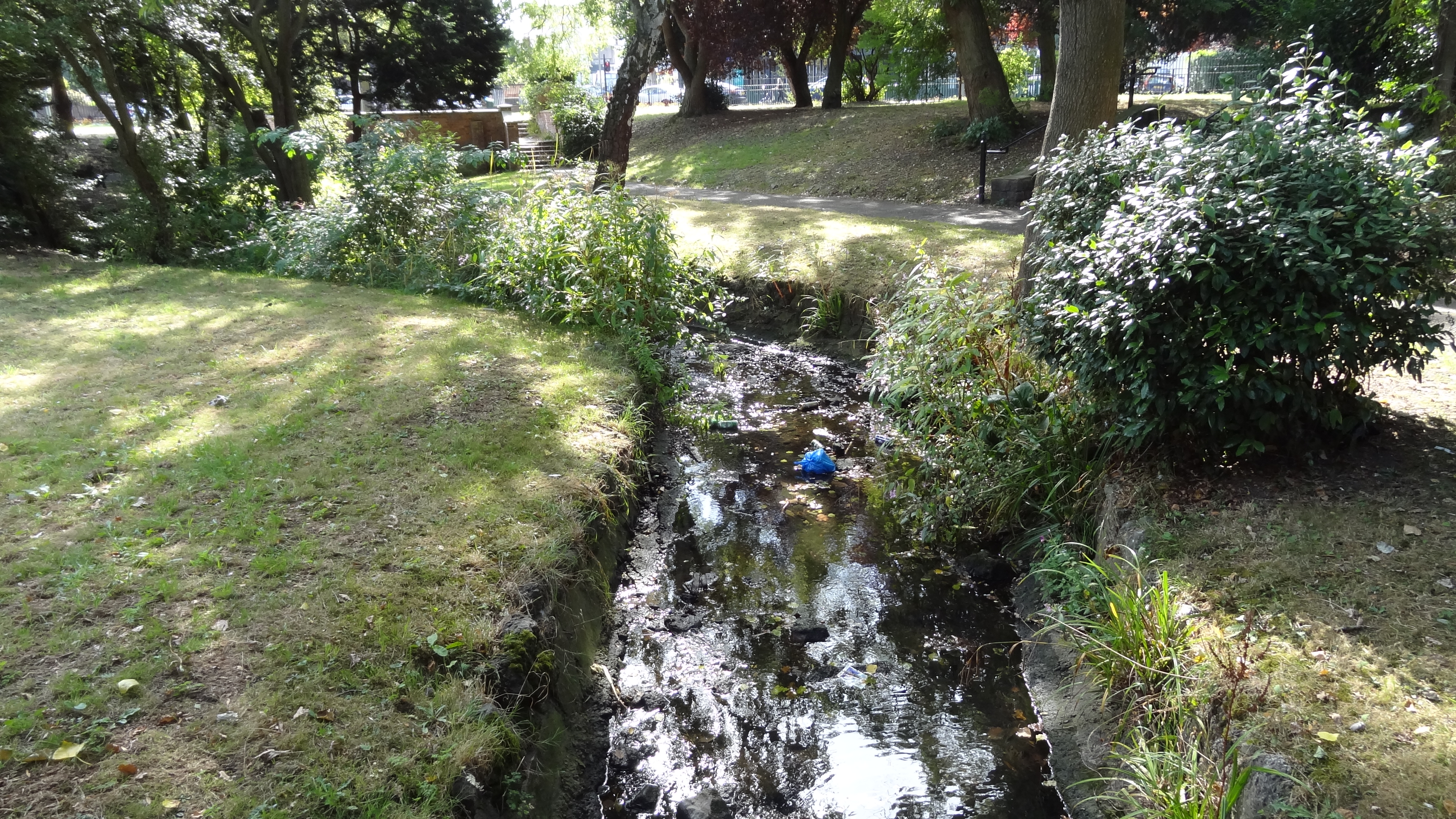
Burnt Oak Brook in Watling Park

Burnt Oak Brook is a one-mile-long stream between Mill Hill and Burnt Oak in the London Borough of Barnet. It is a tributary of the Silk Stream, which is a tributary of the River Brent, which is a tributary of the River Thames.

== The stream's course ==
A minor spring in The Mill Field in Mill Hill is probably a source of a tributary of Burnt Oak Brook, but the brook itself is first visible in Simmonds Mead Open Space, a small green open space at the junction of Watford Way and Lawrence Street. The stream then again passes through an underground pipe to re-emerge in the north-west corner of Lyndhurst Park. It goes along The Meads and under Deansbrook Road to pass through Abbots Road Allotments into Watling Park. On exiting from the park it goes underground to join the Silk Stream near Silkstream Park.

== Ecological value ==
The section of the brook between Lyndhurst Park and Watling Park is part of the Silk Stream and Burnt Oak Brook Site of Borough Importance for Nature Conservation, Grade II. Downstream of Lyndhurst Park, it passes through a narrow belt of mown grass which is left wild close to the brook, with scattered trees and common wild flowers on the banks. In Watling Park the stream mainly follows a natural course and crack-willows, hawthorn and alder form a woodland corridor for wildlife. Grey wagtails often forage among the pebbles of the brook.

== See also ==
- Nature reserves in Barnet
