= Deans Brook =

Stream in Greater London, England

Coordinates: 51.6105°N 0.2707°W

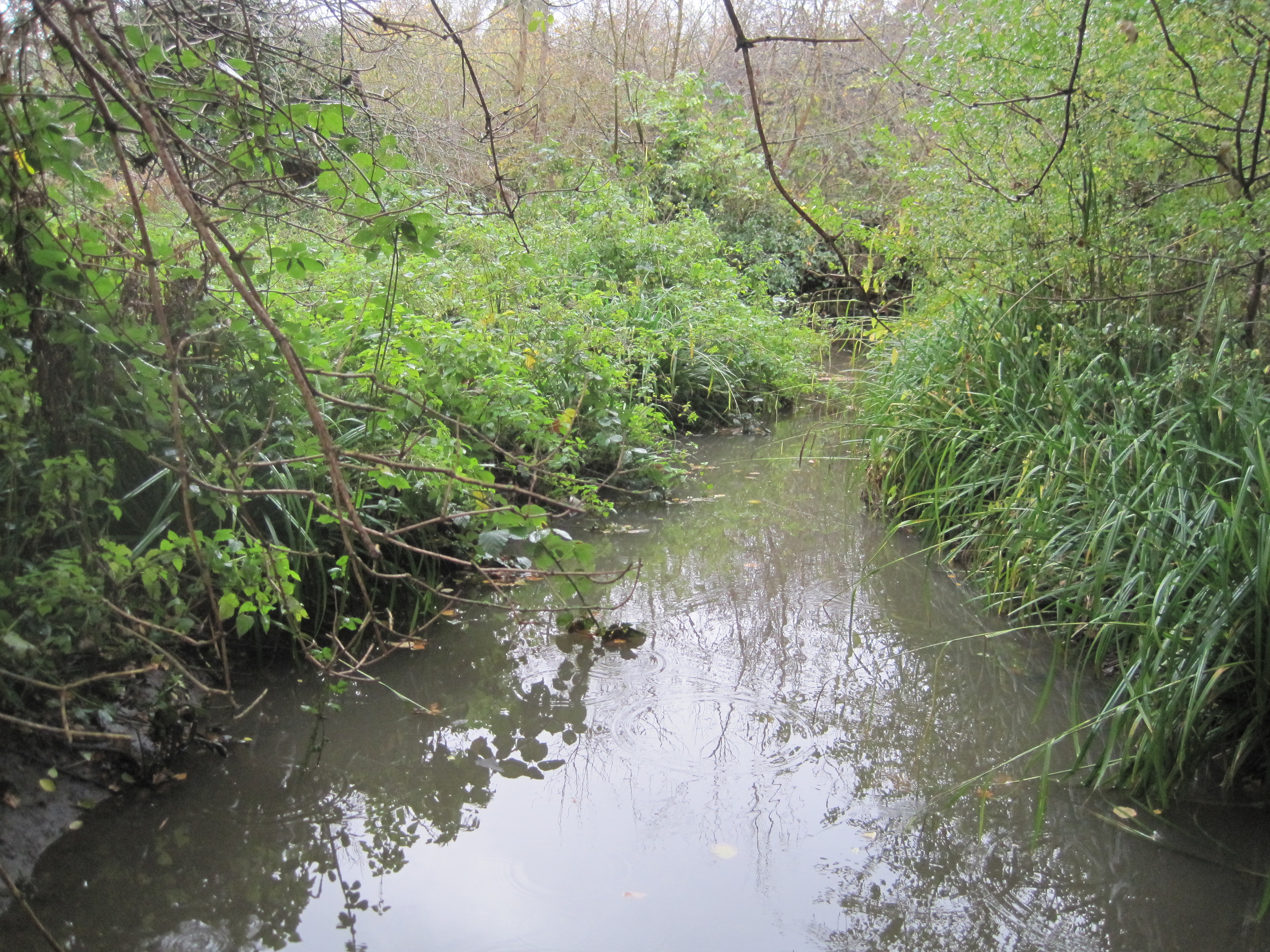
Deans Brook in Stoneyfields Park

Deans Brook is a more than two-kilometre-long stream which runs between Mill Hill and Edgware in the London Borough of Barnet. It is a tributary of the Silk Stream, which is a tributary of the River Brent, which is a tributary of the River Thames.

The brook rises in the hills (Moat Mount and Scratchwood) surrounding the Mill Hill Golf Course, where it is dammed to form a large pond called Stoneywood Lake. The course from these sources has been somewhat modified over the years by five construction events:

Midland Railway (about mid 1860s)

Scratchwood sidings (1880)

Mill Hill golf course and its landscaping (1923-27)

Barnet Bypass (1924-28)

M1 and Gateway services (1960s).

The actual courses over the last 200 years can be traced from, historic OS 1&6 inch to mile maps freely availible on line

The short distance from Stoneywood lake to M1 motorway culvert the brook follows a natural course. After the culvert it follow as a natural stream for a short distance to Stoneyfields Park, where it is again dammed to form an ornamental lake. It then passes through suburban Edgware, where it combines with the Edgware Brook to become the Silk Stream near Edgware Hospital.

The stream largely follows its natural course, but most of the banks are restrained by wooden boards, and there is little aquatic vegetation. Kingfishers and grey wagtails are regularly seen along the brook. A tributary, Edgwarebury Brook, joins it behind Brook Avenue.

The only part of the brook which is accessible to the public is in Stoneyfields Park. Deans Brook, Stoneyfields Park, allotments to the east of Edgware Hospital, and wetland south of Edgware Underground station sidings together form a Site of Borough Importance for Nature Conservation, Grade II.

== See also ==
- Nature reserves in Barnet
