= Silk Stream =

River in North London, England

Coordinates: 51°34′47″N 0°14′45″W

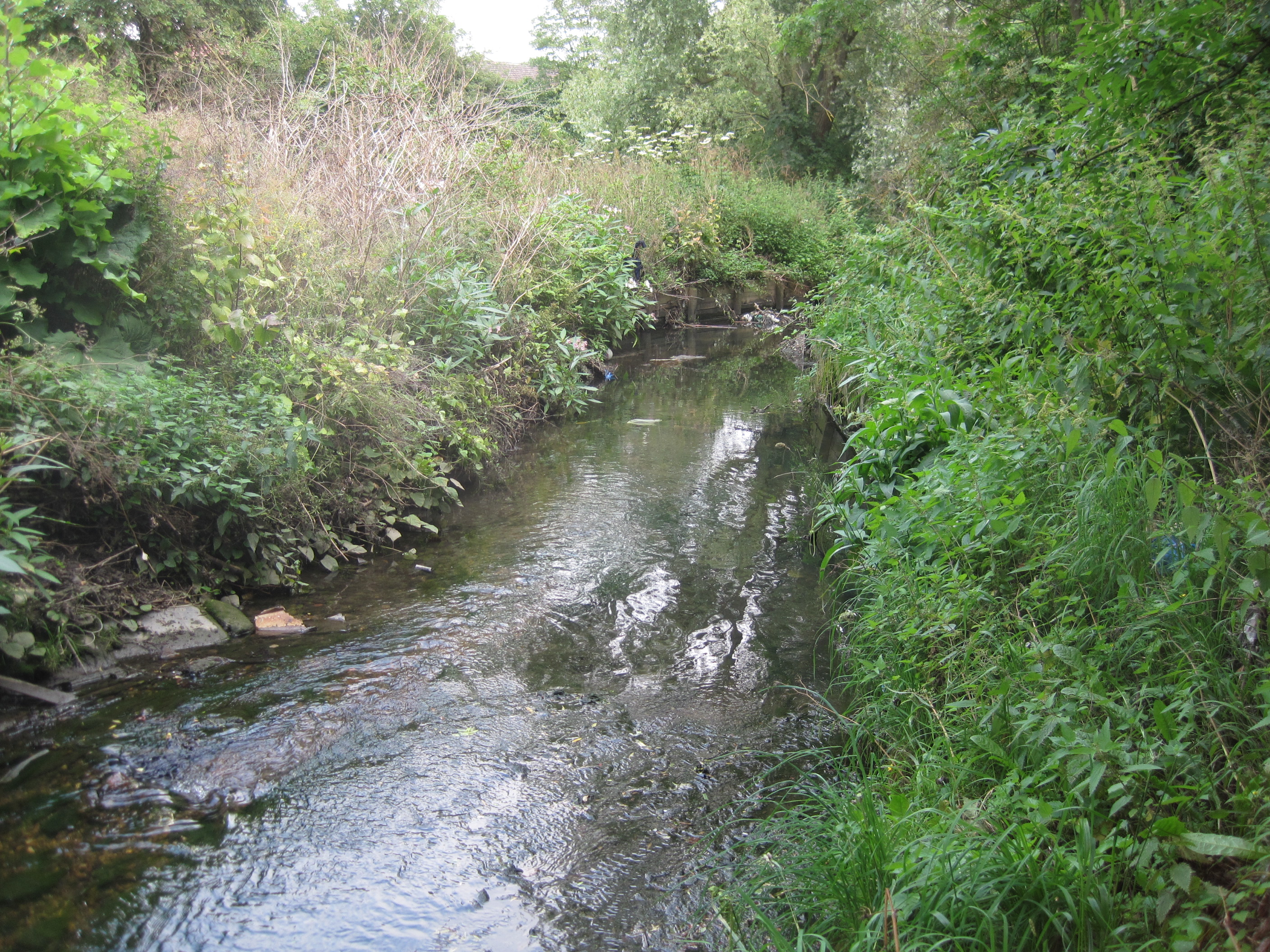
Silk Stream in Silkstream Park, Burnt Oak

The Silk Stream is a brook just over 4 kilometres (2.5 mi) long in the London Borough of Barnet. It is one of the major components of the Blue Ribbon Network.

The Silk Stream is a tributary of the River Brent, which it joins at Brent Reservoir. It has several tributaries including Burnt Oak Brook, Edgware Brook, the Edgwarebury Brook and Deans Brook. The Silk Stream runs north–south through Colindale and Hendon. It gives its name to Silkstream Road, near Burnt Oak station, and the Silk Bridge Retail Park beside where it passes under the A5.

Silk Stream and Burnt Oak Brook are a Site of Borough Importance for Nature Conservation, Grade II.

The name Silk is believed to derive from sulh or sulc, Old English words for plough or furrow.

== See also ==
- Nature reserves in Barnet
