= Edgware Way Grassland =

Coordinates: 51.6248°N 0.2881°W

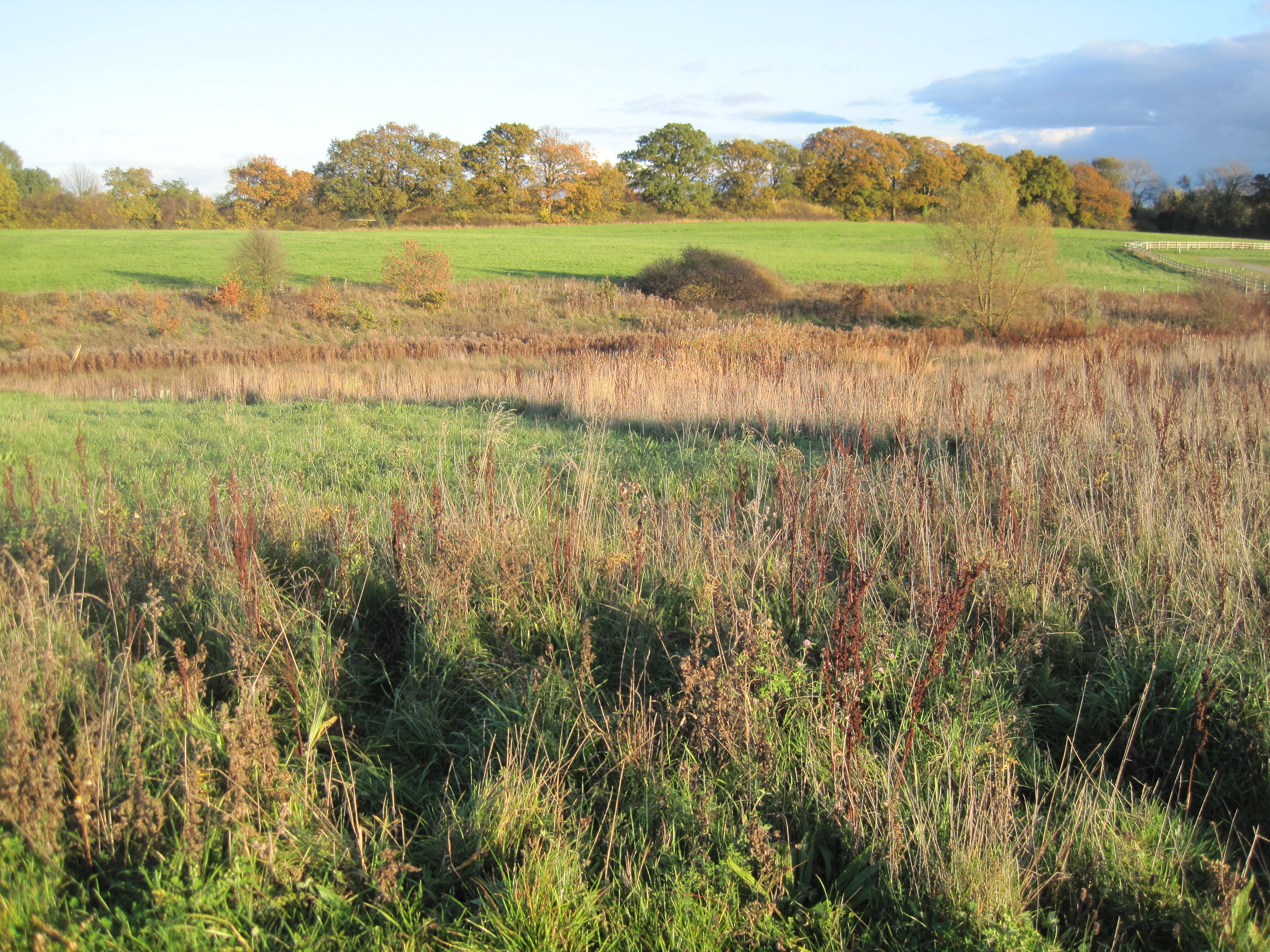

Edgware Way Grassland or Edgware Way Rough is a 6.7-hectare (17-acre) Site of Metropolitan Importance for Nature Conservation in Edgware in the London Borough of Barnet. It is traversed by Edgwarebury Brook and contains traces of a planned railway viaduct and embankment. This was part of a planned extension of the Northern line from Edgware to Bushey, which was cancelled when the introduction of the Green Belt after the Second World War led to the cancellation of the developments which the railway was to serve. Part of the site is the Environment Agency's Edgwarebury Park Flood Storage Area.

The reserve is typical unimproved London Clay grassland. Damp, herb rich areas have uncommon plants characteristic of old meadows such as great burnet, sneezewort and devil's bit scabious. The brook is lined by sedges and water-cress, while breeding birds include yellowhammer and spotted flycatcher.

The reserve adjoins Edgwarebury Park. It is private land, but is crossed by a public footpath from Edgware Way which starts just west of the junction with Spur Road.

== See also ==
- Nature reserves in Barnet
- Brockley Hill tube station
