= Edgwarebury Brook =

Stream in the London Borough of Barnet

Coordinates: 51.624°N 0.284°W

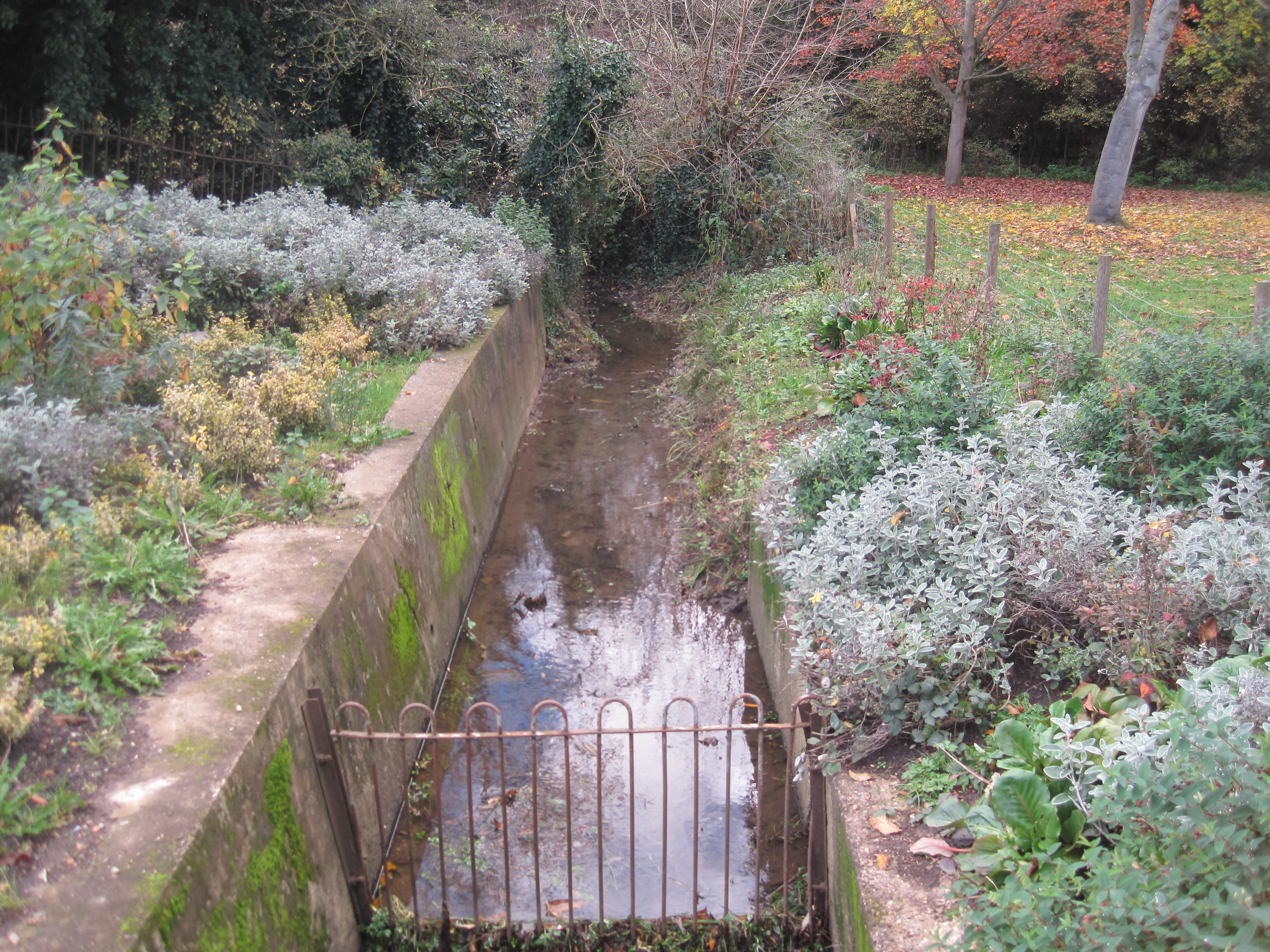
Edgwarebury Brook in Edgwarebury Park

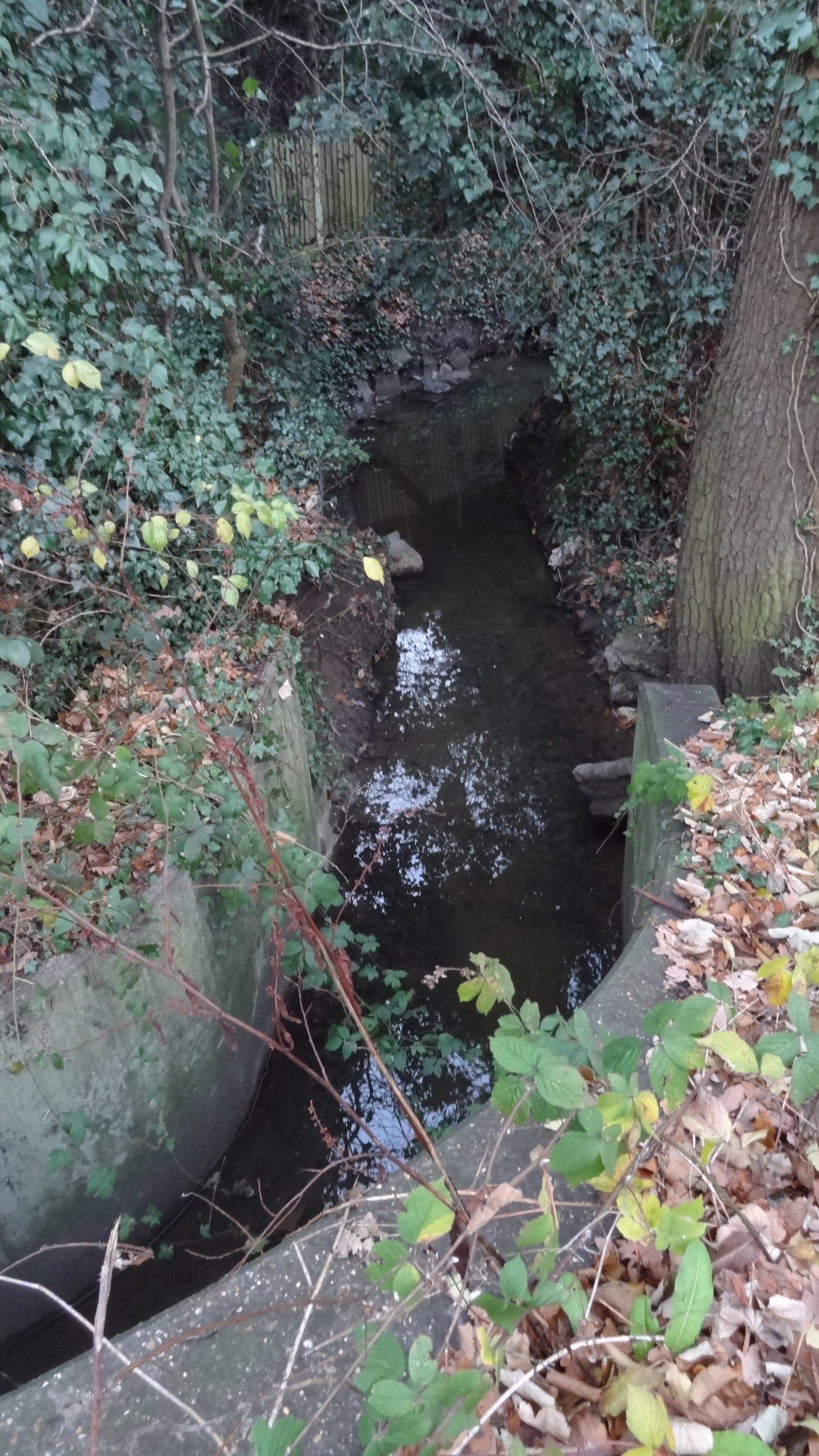
Edgwarebury Brook viewed from Glendale Avenue

Edgwarebury Brook is a small stream in Edgware in the London Borough of Barnet. It is a tributary of Deans Brook, which is a tributary of the Silk Stream, which is a tributary of the River Brent, which is a tributary of the River Thames.

The brook rises near Bury Farm on Edgwarebury Lane. It flows south to skirt the western edge of Edgwarebury Park and then goes under Edgware Way and through Edgware to join Deans Brook behind Brook Avenue.

The brook goes through three Sites of Importance for Nature Conservation (SINCs) in its short length. The upper part is the Edgwarebury Brook SINC, a Site of Borough Importance for Nature Conservation, Grade II. It then passes through Edgware Way Grassland, a Site of Metropolitan Importance, and on to Edgwarebury Park, a Site of Local Importance. After it passes under Edgware Way the water quality is poor and it is mainly culverted, so this last part is not an SINC.

Edgwarebury Brook SINC goes through private land, but it can be viewed near its source next to Edgwarebury Lane. There is extensive floating sweet-grass, with clumps of brooklime and water-pepper. Old oak trees are thought to be relics of ancient field boundaries.

== See also ==
- Nature reserves in Barnet
