= Holland House School =

Location
- 1 Broadhurst Avenue; Edgware, Middlesex, HA8 8TP; England
- Coordinates: 51.62193°N 0.27391°W

Information
- Type: Other Independent School
- Local authority: Barnet
- Department for Education URN: 101380 Tables
- Ofsted: Reports
- Headmistress: Mrs Emily Brown
- Gender: Coeducational
- Age: 4 to 11
- Website: http://www.hollandhouse.org.uk

Holland House School, Edgware, London, is an independent non-denominational preparatory school for boys and girls from four to eleven years of age. The current headmistress is Mrs. Emily Brown. There are 141 pupils in total as of 2011 (full-time pupils: 55 boys and 86 girls).

== Ofsted ==
In December 1, 2011, Ofsted judged the school to be ‘Outstanding’ in an Ofsted Report. They described how high quality the education quality was (judged outstanding [1]), the exemplary behaviour of pupils (judged outstanding [1]) and the safety of pupils (judged good [2]). Ofsted lavished pupils and teachers for ‘polite and welcoming behaviour’.

== History ==
In 1974, the Board of Governors, all parents at the time, purchased the school and formed a Charitable Education Trust.

In 1983 the School was enlarged to accommodate 140 children in a purpose-built, modern building.

In 2008/2009, a major refurbishment of the School was completed to provide up-to-date facilities that include a computer suite, an art/drama/music room, interactive Smartboards and new administrative offices. In Spring 2009, the kitchen was relocated to provide space for a new school library.
