= Edgwarebury Park =

Park in Edgware, London, England

Coordinates: 51.6251°N 0.2828°W

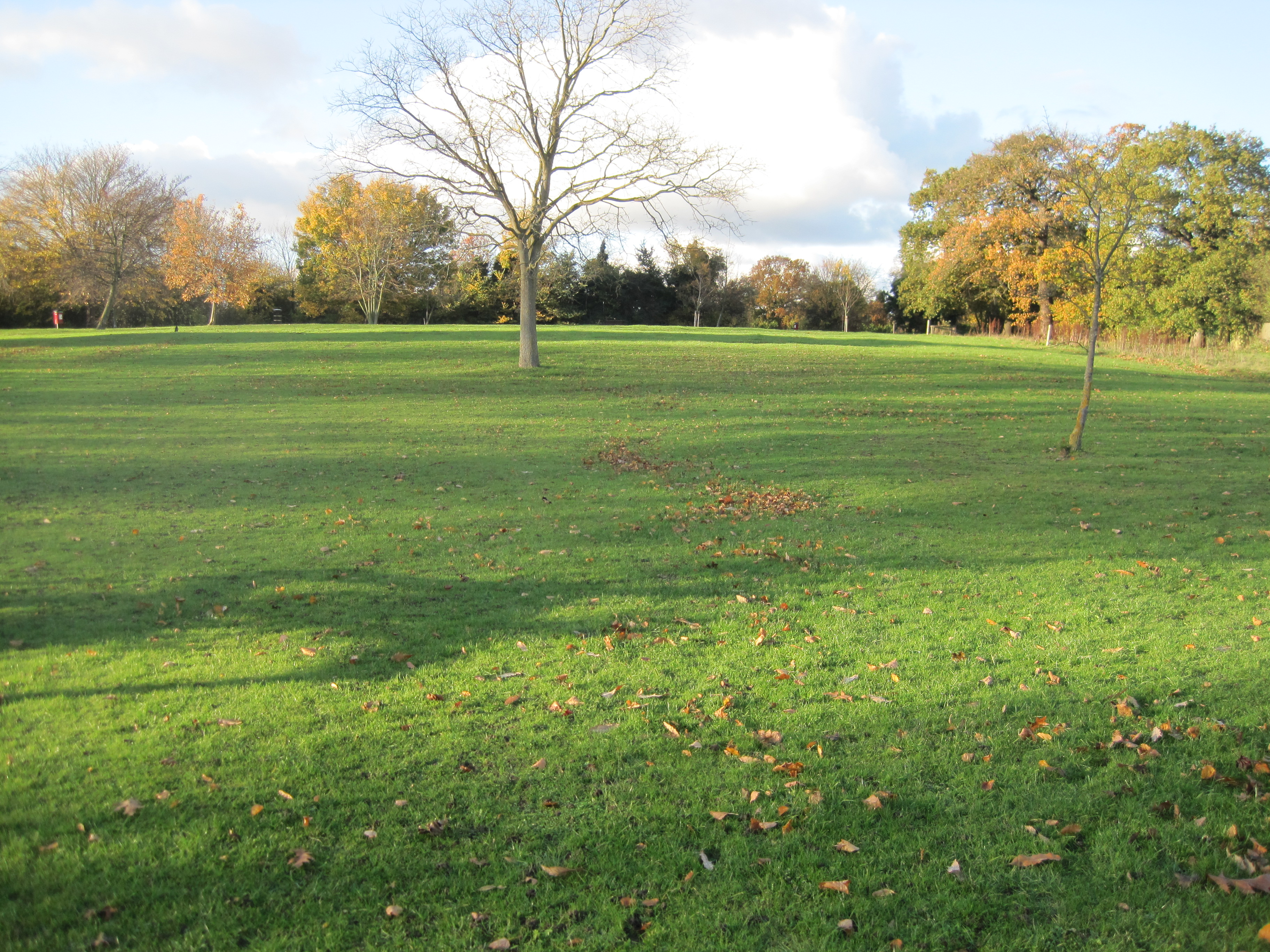
Edgwarebury Park

Edgwarebury Park is a 22-hectare park in Edgware in the London Borough of Barnet. It was once part of the manor of Earlsbury, which was first mentioned in 1216. In the later Middle Ages it was owned by All Souls College, Oxford, and there is still evidence of the older landscape of fields and woodland. Hendon Rural District and Middlesex County Council bought the land in two parts in 1929 and 1932, and the park opened in the latter year. It is now owned and managed by Barnet Council.

The park has extensive sports facilities, a playground, a cafe, and ornamental gardens. During the 1990s, Watling Chase Community Forest planted a new block of woodland in the north east corner. Edgwarebury Brook runs down the western side, with Edgware Way Grassland adjacent.

Edgwarebury Park is a Site of Local Importance for Nature Conservation, its most distinctive feature being its magnificent old hedgerows. Fine old oak and ash trees tower over the bushes, and the wild service-tree is an indicator of the hedgerows' antiquity. The park is an excellent site for birdwatching. Species include song thrush, mistle thrush, great spotted woodpecker and whitethroat.

There is access from Edgware Way and Edgwarebury Lane.

== Gallery ==
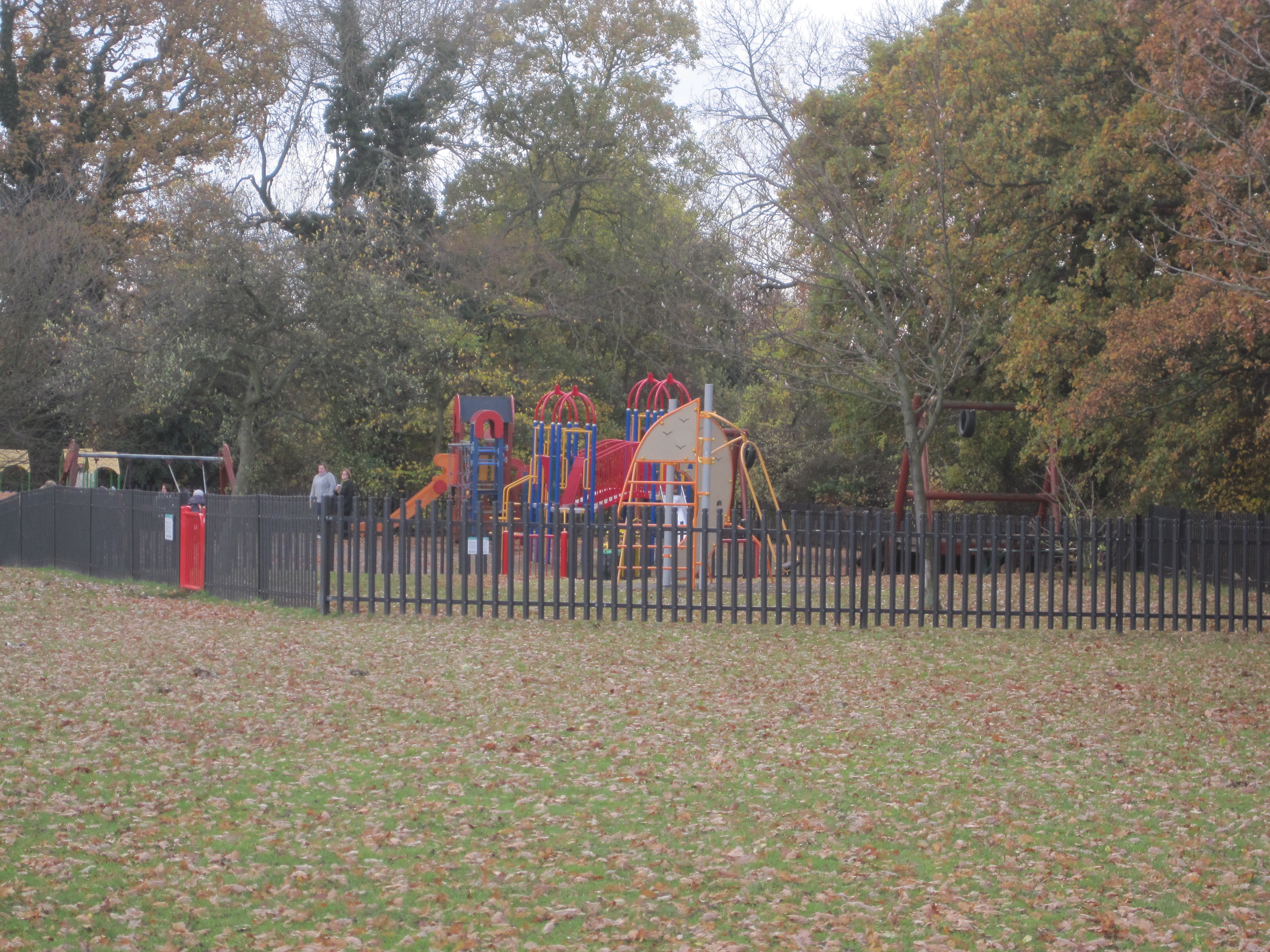
Playground

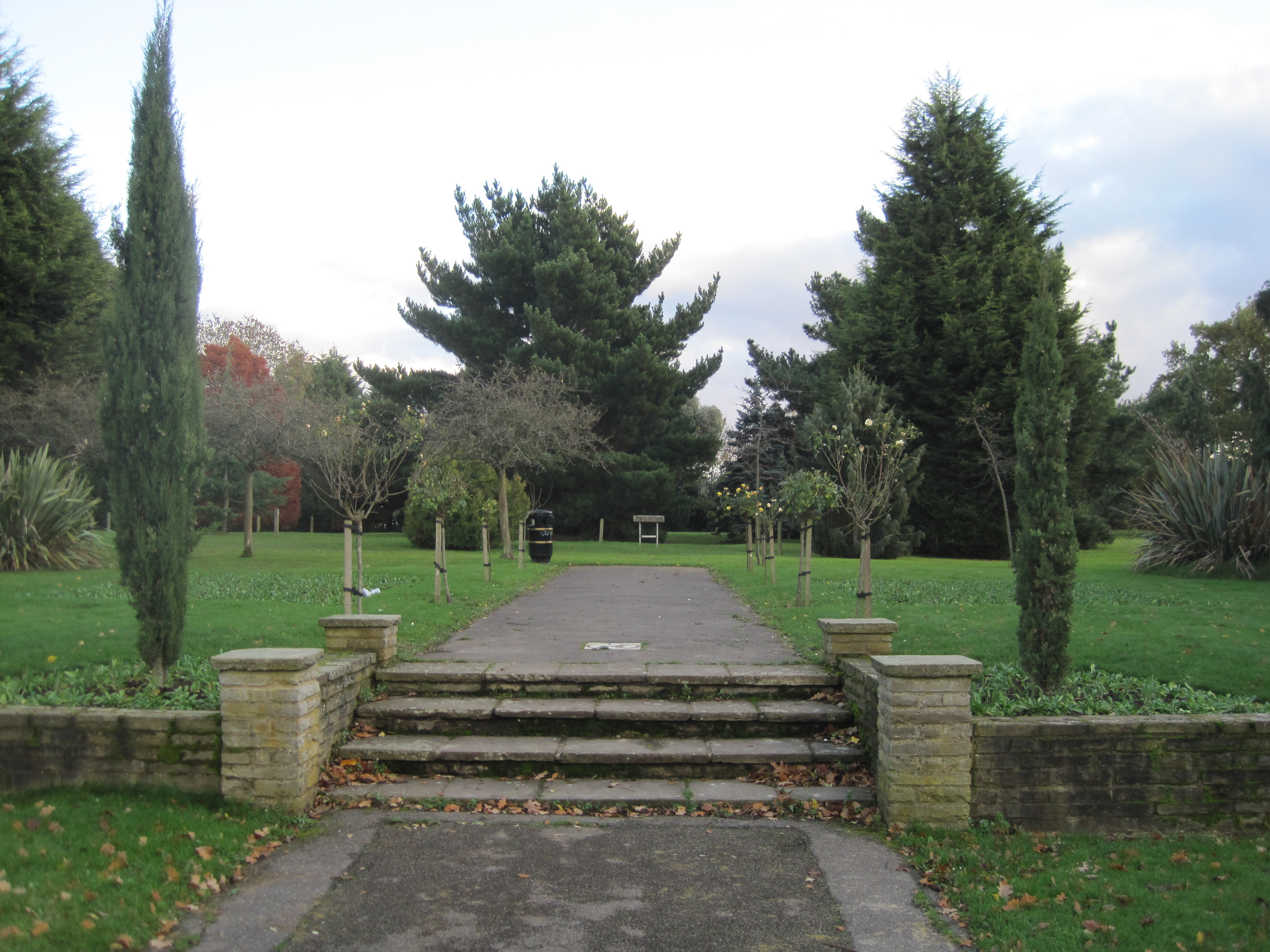
Pinetum planted 1982-1986

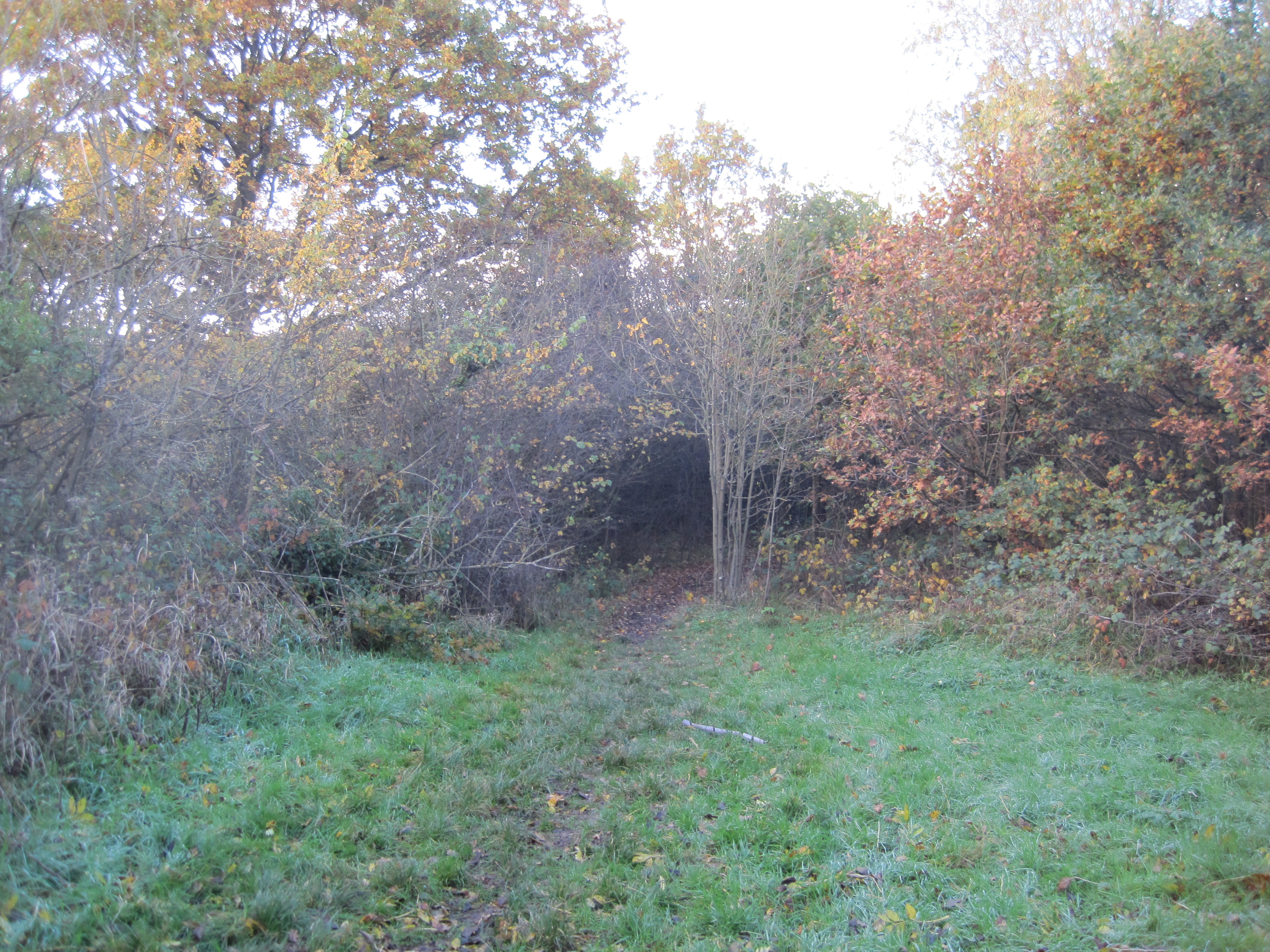
Wood at north end

== See also ==
- Barnet parks and open spaces
- Nature reserves in Barnet
