= The Broadwalk Centre =

Coordinates: 51.6125°N 0.2753°W

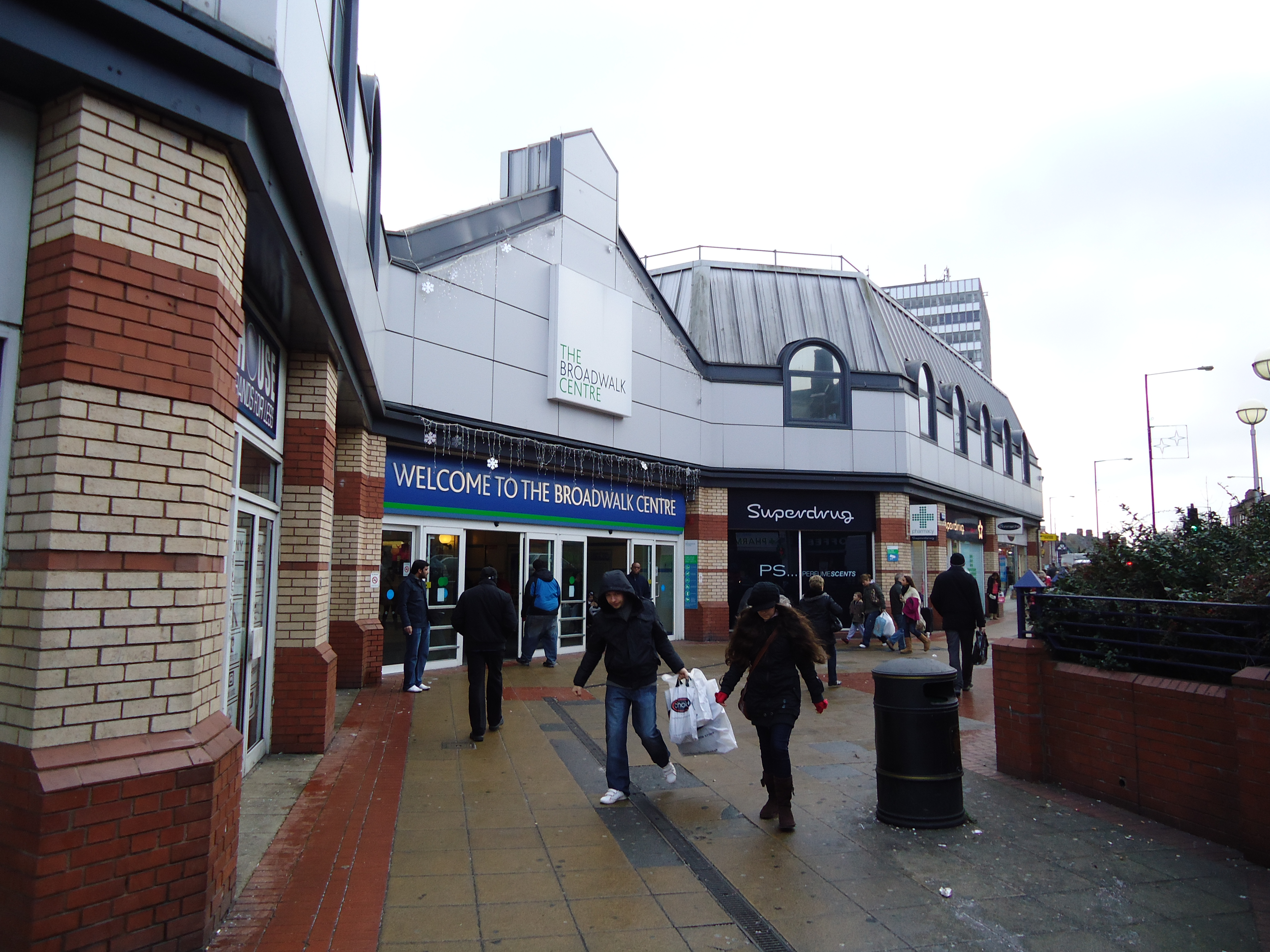
- Entrance, pictured 2010
- Location: Edgware, England
- Opened: 1990
- Owner: Scottish Widows Investment Partnership
- Num. of stores: 40
- Floor area: 190,000 sq ft (18,000 m^{2})
- Parking: 1100 spaces
- Website: www.thebroadwalkcentre.co.uk

The Broadwalk Centre is a shopping centre located in the town of Edgware, Greater London, and is owned by Ballymore Group having been purchased from Scottish Widows Investment Partnership (SWIP), having been purchased from The Carlyle Group and Bride Hall Holdings for £70 million in March 2012. The centre is 190,000 sq ft in area and was opened in 1990 at the site of the former Edgware railway station building.

The Broadwalk Centre is a single-storey shopping centre and holds over 40 retail shops including Sainsbury's, TK Maxx (formerly Marks & Spencer), Boots, Poundland, TGJones, Costa Coffee, and Superdrug, as well as disabled and public toilets and baby changing facilities.

A public meeting room was added in January 2022.

Edgware tube station and Edgware bus station can be easily accessed via a side entrance. There is a car park accessed via station road, which also has a commuter section for the underground.

It was owned by The Mall Fund until 2008. In summer 2013, SWIP announced that it was in pre-application discussions with Barnet Council about a supermarket and cinema extension which could increase the size of the scheme by more than half.

As of 2020, Broadwalk is tipped for regeneration.
