= St Margaret of Antioch, Edgware =

Coordinates: 51°36′41″N 0°16′43″W

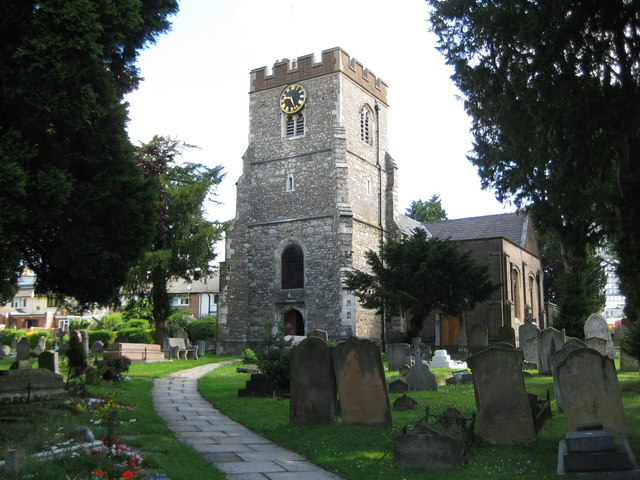
- St Margaret of Antioch, Edgware
- St Margaret of Antioch, Edgware
- Country: England
- Denomination: Church of England
- Website: www.edgwareparish.org.uk/stmargarets-aboutus.htm

Architecture
- Heritage designation: Grade II

Administration
- Diocese: London
- Archdeaconry: Hampstead
- Deanery: West Barnet
- Parish: Edgware

Clergy
- Vicar: Simon Curtis

St Margaret of Antioch is the Church of England parish church for Edgware. It is located at the junction of Watling Street and Station Road.

== History ==
The church was first mentioned in the 13th century, where it was stated to be used by the Knights Hospitaller. The tower dates from the 16th century. The remainder of the church is of red brick, and was largely rebuilt in 1764 and again in 1845.

It has been a Grade II listed building since 1950.

The Church also had a strong connection with the 2nd Edgware Scouts. The Group, which was formed in 1929, formerly had the title of "St. Margaret's" until the Group ceased to be sponsored by the Church in 1971, however the involvement between church and Scouts continued as did Church Parades.
