= Edgware =

Suburban town in north-west London, England

Coordinates: 51.6185°N 0.2729°W

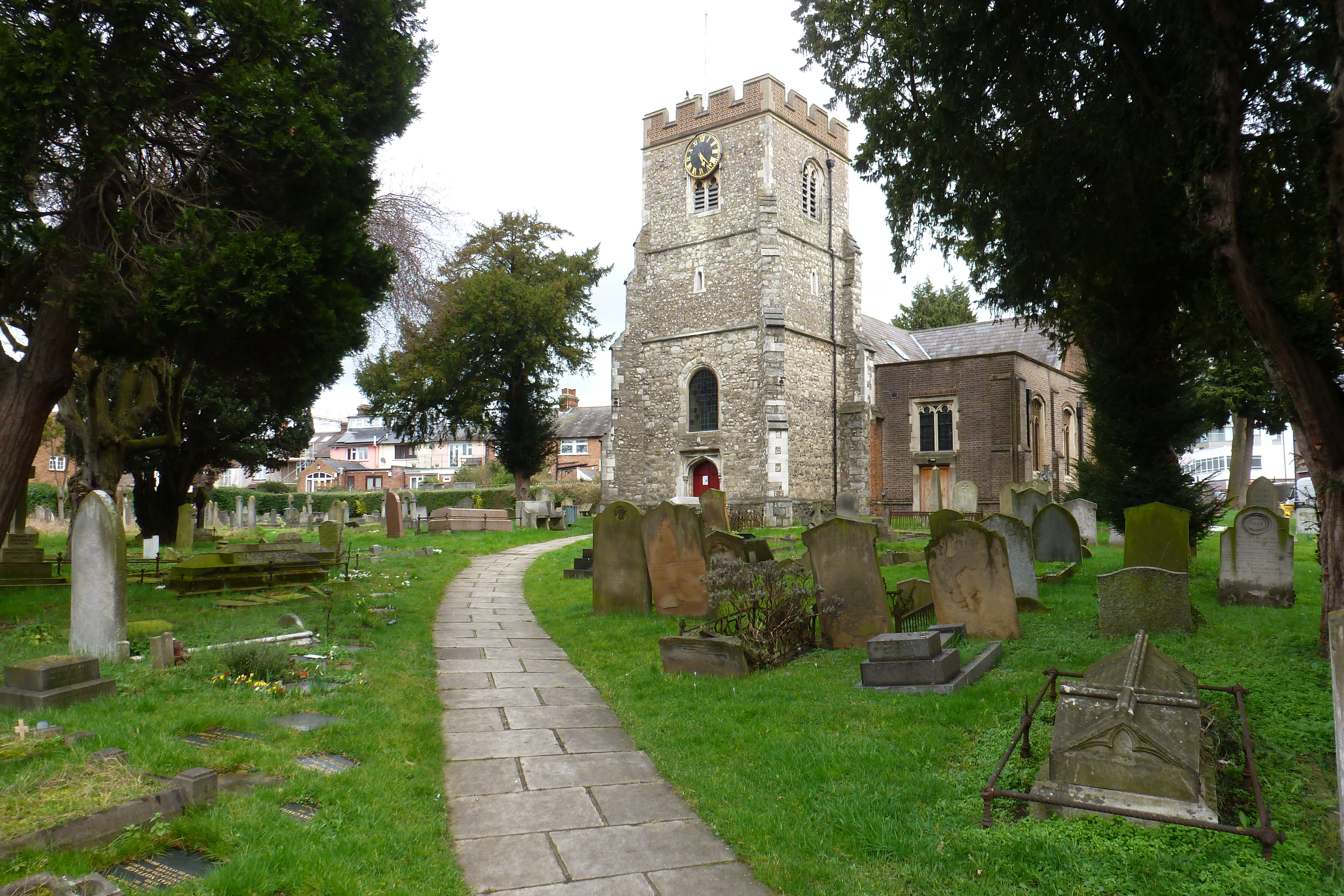
- Church of St Margaret of Antioch

- Location within Greater London
- Population: 58,619 (Note: Harrow’s Canons and Edgware wards and Barnet’s Burnt Oak and Edgware wards from the 2011 Census.)
- OS grid reference: TQ195925
  - Charing Cross: 10 mi (16 km) SE
- London borough: Barnet; Harrow
- Ceremonial county: Greater London
- Region: London
- Country: England
- Sovereign state: United Kingdom
- Post town: EDGWARE
- Postcode district: HA8
- Post town: LONDON
- Postcode district: NW7
- Dialling code: 020
- Police: Metropolitan
- Fire: London
- Ambulance: London
- UK Parliament: Hendon
- London Assembly: Barnet and Camden

Edgware (/ˈɛdʒwɛər/) is a suburban town in north-west London, Greater London, England. It was an ancient parish in the historic county of Middlesex, east of the ancient Watling Street in what is now the London Borough of Barnet; it is now informally considered to cover a wider area, including parts of the borough of Harrow. (Note: Both Barnet and Harrow have Edgware wards. The HA8 postal area associated with Edgware includes parts of Barnet, Harrow and Brent.) The district is located 10 miles (16 km) north-north-west of Charing Cross and has a generally suburban character. The urban-rural fringe includes some elevated woodland on a high gravel and sand ridge along the Hertfordshire border with Greater London.

It is principally a shopping and residential area, identified in the London Plan as one of the capital's 35 major centres, and one of the northern termini of the Northern line. It has a bus garage, a shopping centre called the Broadwalk Centre, a library, a community hospital and two streams: Edgware Brook and Deans Brook, which merge and become known as the Silk Stream, itself a tributary of the river Brent. The town had a population of 58,619 in 2011.

== Toponymy ==
Edgware is an Old English place-name first recorded in the 970s as Aegces wer, meaning Ecgi's weir. Ecgi is a Saxon name and the weir relates to a pond where his people would catch fish. The name was subsequently applied to the ancient parish of Edgware.

A legal record of 1422 mentions Eggeswer, in Middlesex, which, being in Latin, may have been written deliberately using an older form of the spelling. By 1489 and the beginning of the Tudor period, those writing the name added the "d" and it was Edggeware.

== History ==
=== Origins and pre-industrial history ===
The Romans made pottery at Brockley Hill, thought by some to be the site of Sulloniacis.

Edgware does not appear in the Domesday survey of 1086. A manorial centre has, since at least 1216, been Edgwarebury Farm.

Edgware Road follows the same line as the ancient Watling Street, an important Roman Road, and used in the medieval period by pilgrims. The Road was improved by the Edgware-Kilburn turnpike trust in 1711 and a number of the local inns functioned as a stop for coaches. By 1867, a railway line had been built between Edgware and Finsbury Park and a station was built. James Brydges, 1st Duke of Chandos built a stately home called Cannons in nearby Little Stanmore, around 1713 for £250,000 (equivalent to £44,375,978 in 2025) and was, by far, the wealthiest resident in the vicinity at that time.

By the 17th century, Edgware had a small market selling cattle driven from other parts of England and fattened and sold locally. Local trades included butchers, tailors, colliers (charcoal sellers) and brewers. The market was held every week but petered out in 1790s.

Edgware was associated with the highwayman Dick Turpin. The infamous scene of his worst incident, on 4 February 1735, was when five gang members, including Turpin, broke into Earlsbury Farm, owned by Joseph Lawrence. Lawrence was aged at least 70 and yet Turpin et al. beat him with their pistols and tortured him by setting him on a fire whilst naked, before announcing that they would amputate his legs. While this was going on, the leader of the gang took a servant girl upstairs and raped her.

=== Early economic history ===
Industry played a minor role in the economy of Edgware. There was a cattle and pleasure fair from 1760s to 1860s, with horse racing between 1834 and 1855. Ribbon development along this part of the A5 road included development in the parish of Edgware to the east of the road, and Little Stanmore to the west of it.

Gravel pits were probably being worked by 1802 and certainly by 1834, partly at least by the labour of the able-bodied poor as a parish employment and, in 1963, gravel was still being extracted on the eastern side of the parish. In 1831, there were no people engaged in manufacturing in the parish; there were no industries until 1900 when Chas. Wright Ltd, manufacturing engineers, moved from Clerkenwell. It was employed for the UK government in World War I and, after this, it struck two million Mons or 1914 Stars and Victory Medals. Its largest production in World War II was for the metal parts of respirator filters, making 94 million between 1937 and 1943. In 1963, the company was chiefly engaged in the manufacture of car registration plates. There were 70 workmen employed, together with an office staff of 30. The firm of A.E.W. Ltd., founded in 1923 and established in Edgware in 1927, employed 50 people at the start of the 1970s; it manufactured laboratory and industrial electric ovens, and furnaces.

This place, from its situation within an easy distance of the metropolis, and the excellence of the road to it through an almost uninterrupted succession of elegant villas and agreeable scenery, has become the residence of numerous opulent and respectable families.

Edgware had few residents for its size but saw some prosperous commerce; in 1870, for instance, there were six insurance agents in the village. The opening of the Great Northern Railway branch in 1867, however, had little effect on the expansion of the village and plans to extend the railway met with strong local opposition. A Bill to establish a line from Watford to Edgware, brought before Parliament in 1896 and 1897, was opposed by residents, and it was said that the real harm of the railways was the opening up of building sites 'which are quickly covered with architectural atrocities'. In this time, the parish had begun to display a tendency to split into an opulent north and a workaday south, separated by an agricultural buffer zone.

By 1896, several large houses had been built in the Elstree area or along the Elstree to Barnet road, while the old village gained the post office, the infants' school, the station, and the Railway Hotel. The southern part of the parish was unable to repel the tide of suburban development, but the threatened distinction was to a large extent averted by the quality of buildings between the two world wars.

=== Suburban transformation ===
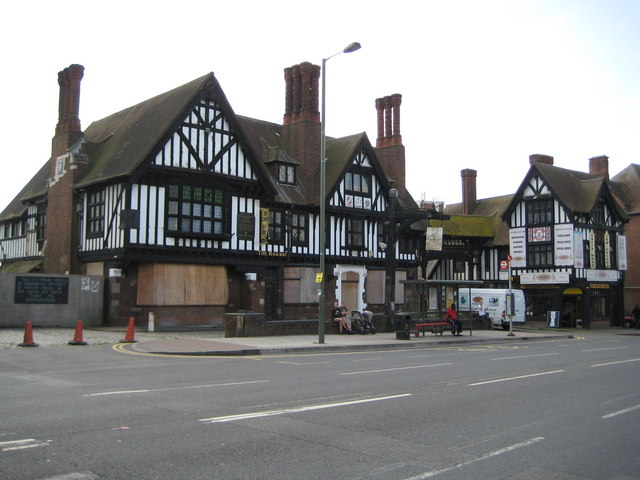
The Grade II listed, former Railway Hotel on Station Road

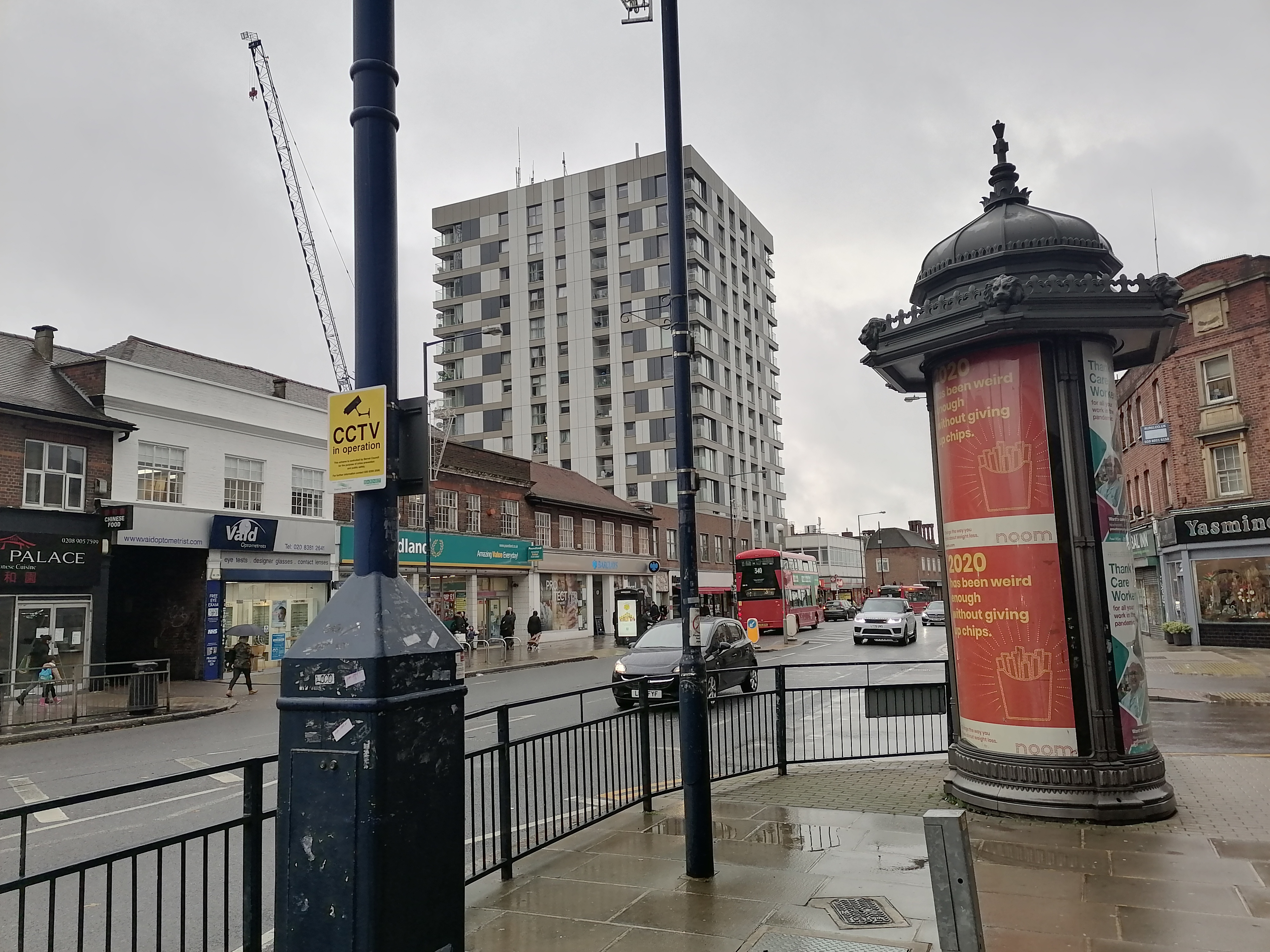
Station Road

The first non-tube connected railway accompanied a brief decline in population. By the mid 19th century, the area was almost entirely for the purpose of hay production. In 1939, the overground railway passenger service ceased to run, and goods traffic ceased by 1964. A tram service began in 1904. In 1921, the population was 1,516. Although much suburban development was encouraged by the opening of the Edgware tube station in 1924, the area was already attracting developers like George Cross to the area by 1919. The conurbation increased as far north as the Edgware Way. In 1932, the parish became a part of Hendon Urban District. The shopping district around Station Road developed to include the Ritz Cinema, which opened in May 1932. Following several name changes the cinema was eventually demolished in 2001 and replaced by a large gym, apartments and a Caffè Nero. Edgware Town F.C. was founded in 1939, after a predecessor team in 1915.

A general hospital on Burnt Oak Broadway dates back to an infirmary that was added at a workhouse from the Hendon Board of Guardians in 1865, with an all new site adjacent to it built and opened with 175 beds in December 1927 as Redhill Hospital. It was extended greatly by Middlesex County Council in the late 1930s. It became part of the National Health Service in 1948 and was renamed Edgware General Hospital.

Post-war development has been restricted by the Metropolitan Green Belt, sparing urban sprawl into the Scratch Wood and Deacons Hill areas, apart from the M1 motorway. By this time the population was more than 17,000. In 1990, the Mall Shopping Centre, originally named the Broadwalk Shopping Centre, replaced the former Edgware Town station which was demolished in 1961.

Following a review in 1994, Edgware General Hospital was closed controversially by the Conservative government of John Major in April 1997, despite public opposition. After the Labour election victory, the closure was upheld, leading to further outcry from the public. Eventually a review and lengthy consultations took place with local campaigners and authorities, which resulted in the building of a community hospital. Some of the General Hospital site was demolished and Edgware Community Hospital, which cost £38 million, opened in its place in February 2005.

Edgware was identified in 2008 as a major centre for preferred development in the London Plan.

In the mid-2010s, many new apartments have been built on Green Lane.

== Governance ==
=== Administration ===
Edgware was an ancient parish of 2,089 acres (845 ha) in the historic county of Middlesex. It was part of a grouping of parishes called Hendon Rural District (Note: This did not include Hendon.) from 1894. On 1 April 1931, Edgware parish was abolished and merged with Hendon and, as such, Edgware was moved from Hendon Rural District to the separate Hendon Urban District which did include Hendon.

The following year, Hendon Urban District became the Municipal Borough of Hendon. In 1965, the Borough of Hendon merged with the Municipal Borough of Finchley, the urban districts of Barnet, East Barnet and Friern Barnet to become the new London Borough of Barnet.

At the 1921 census, (Note: One of the last before the abolition of the parish.) Edgware had a population of 1516.

=== Boundaries and scope ===
The ancient parish formally defined the extent of Edgware for over 800 years, but the district is now sometimes perceived as covering a wider area.

==== Ancient parish ====
Ancient parishes served one or more manors (Note: Occasionally very large manors would be divided into more than one parish.) The boundaries of these underlying manors occasionally changed through subinfeudation (sub-division), and parish boundaries might sometimes change with that but, in 1180, the parish boundaries were frozen, so that sub-division of parishes was unusual after that time, usually only occurring in rapidly developing urban areas.

The ancient parish served by St Margaret's church was bounded to the west by Roman Watling Street with the parish of Little Stanmore beyond it. South of Deans Brook and Edgware Brook to the south and east was Hendon. Ecgi's Weir, which gave the district its name is likely to have been built on one of these boundary brooks.

The parish appears to have inherited a much older boundary along these brooks, as these are described as part of the boundary of an estate in neighbouring Hendon.

The parish's northern boundary with the parish of Elstree, was also that of Middlesex and Hertfordshire. Middlesex's northern boundary was, in this area, marked by a 12 miles (20 km) hedge of great antiquity. When still unfragmented, the hedge extended from the river Colne (Middlesex's western boundary) to Barnet Gate Wood. This boundary of Middlesex with Hertfordshire was inherited, in part, by the new Greater London in 1965.

The area of Edgware was consistent and, in the 1930s, measured as 3.3 mi^{2} (8.5 km^{2}).

==== Electoral wards ====
Both Barnet and Harrow have electoral wards named Edgware. The ward in Harrow was called South Stanmore until 2002. Electoral wards are regularly altered to ensure a consistent number of electors per ward across a local authority area.

==== Postal area ====
Edgware is part of the HA postcode area, named after nearby Harrow, of the London post town. More specifically Edgware is part of the HA8 postcode locality, associated with Edgware, but which covers a much wider area including Burnt Oak, The Hale, Canons Park and parts of Queensbury. In this way, HA8 take in part of the boroughs of Barnet, Harrow and Brent. Postcode areas are an operational convenience for the Royal Mail and not intended to define districts.

Some eastern streets are in the NW postcode area of north-west London.

== Geography ==
Edgware town centre lies about 200 feet (60 m) above sea level. Much of Edgware is steep, particularly around Edgwarebury Park (Note: A Site of Nature Conservation Interest.) and the Broadfields Estate.

The Edgwarebury Brook (Note: Not to be confused with the Edgware Brook.) is a tributary of the Deans Brook which, with Edgware Brook, form the historic southern boundary of the area; they merge to take the name Silk Stream in the vicinity of Edgware Hospital. The Silk Stream is a tributary of the river Brent, which it meets at Brent Reservoir.

Open spaces in the area include Edgwarebury Park and Stoneyfields Park.

=== Demography and religion ===
Edgware (parish) population
1881	816
1891	864
1901	868
1911	1,233
1921	1,516
Absorbed by Hendon parish ►
source: UK census

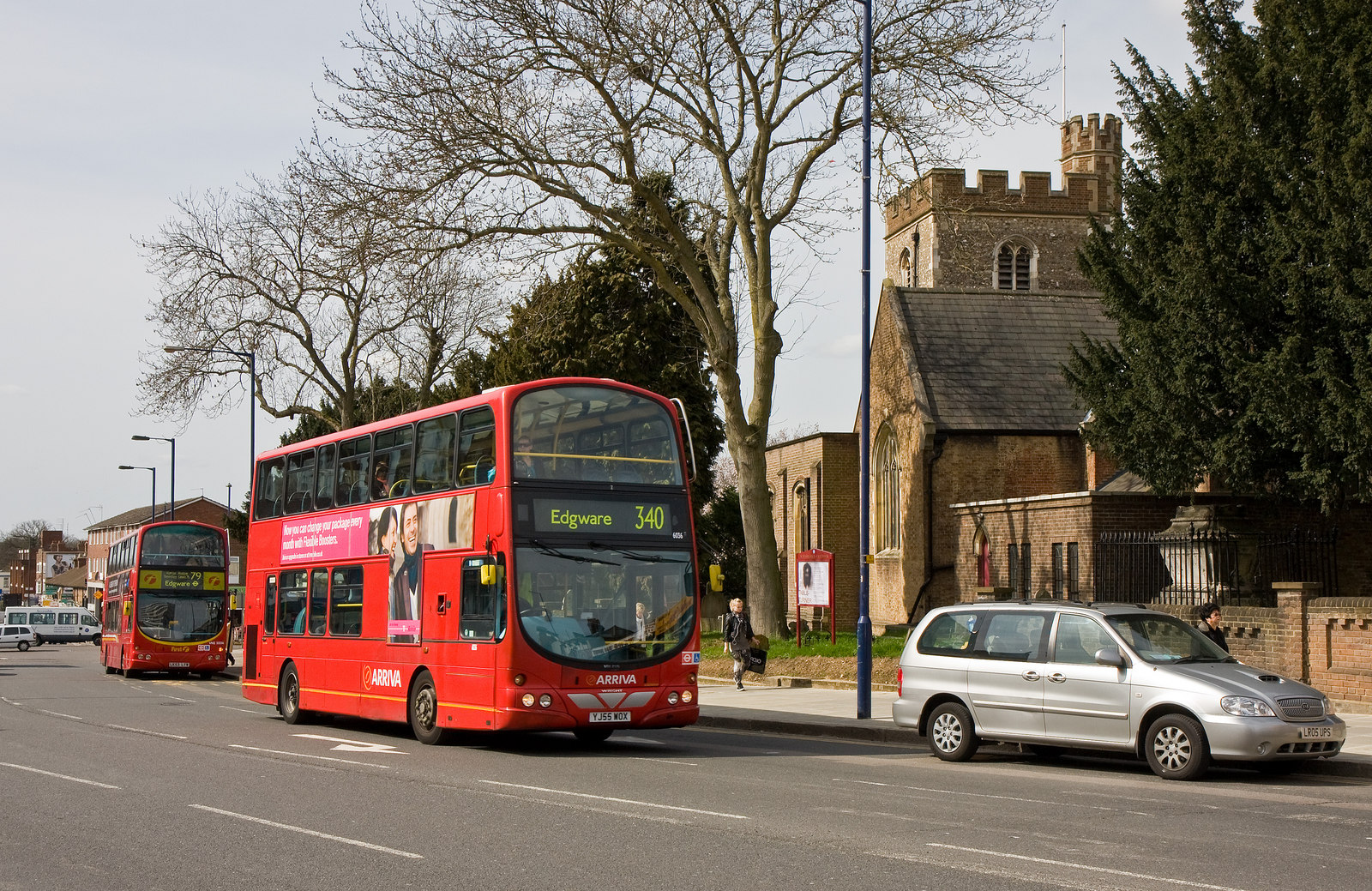
A view of Station Road, with St Margaret of Antioch Church can be seen in the background.

Hanukkah menorah outside Edgware tube station (2006)

Until the 20th century, there were no major rises in the population of Edgware. In the manor of Edgware in 1277, there were eight free tenants (excluding the Grand Priory of Clerkenwell) and 52 customary tenants (assumed to all be men); the survey from which these figures are taken, however, includes lands appurtenant to the manor lying in Kingsbury. In 1425–26, the manor of Edgware had three free and 29 customary tenants in the parish; in 1525–26, the numbers were two or three free and 26 customary tenants. In 1547, there were 120 (adult or teenage) communicants in the parish. In 1597, there were between 60 and 70 houses in the parish, and 44 more in the village of Edgware but on the west side of Watling Street and therefore in the parish of Little Stanmore. In 1599, there were six free and 25 customary tenants of the manor within Edgware.

In 1642, in the Civil War the protestation oath of 1641 was taken by 103 adult males. In 1664, there were 73 houses in the parish, but the hearth tax of 1672 gives only 66. During the 18th century, the average numbers both of baptisms and burials declined gently but steadily. In the period 1717–26, the average number of baptisms was between 15 and 16 a year and the average number of burials was 20; by 1801, 10 the figures were 11 and 9, respectively. There were said to be 69 houses in the village in 1766 and 76 houses in 1792.

At the first census in 1801, the population was 412. Throughout the 19th century, numbers rose slowly, except for the years between 1851 and 1871; the censuses of 1861 and 1871 show successive declines of 7%, attributed in 1871 to migration and to the absence of direct trains to London.

Ten years later, the losses had been more than made good, and in 1901 the figure of 868 had been reached. By 1921, the population had grown to 1,516, but the great infilling of the southern part of Edgware after 1924 caused the most spectacular increase. In 1931, the population was 5,352; this had increased to 17,513 by 1951 and to 20,127 by 1961.

As well as Christian and subsequent settling of other religious groups, Edgware's development coincided with that of its Jewish community, currently forming the largest single religious group. In the 2001 Census, 36% of Edgware residents give their religion as Jewish, 28% Christian, 9% Hindu and 5% Muslim. The Jewish community in Edgware has constructed its own Eruv.

Edgware has a strong Jewish character, and also has significant Hindu and Muslim minorities, mostly of Indian origin.

According to the 2011 census:

- Edgware ward of Barnet was 60% White (47% British, 12% Other White, 1% Irish). 13% was Indian and 7% Black African. 33% of the population was Jewish, 28% Christian and 11% Muslim.
- Hale ward of Barnet (east from the centre) was 59% White (45% British, 12% Other, 2% Irish) and 10% Indian; 39% was Christian and 19% Jewish. The most spoken foreign language is Gujarati, followed by Persian and Romanian.

== Economy ==
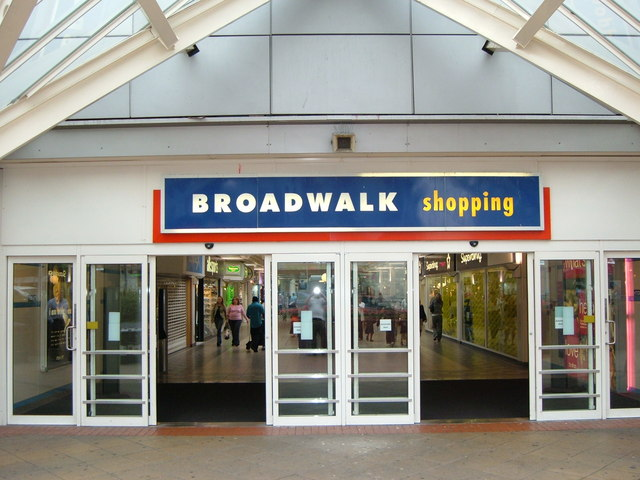
The Broadwalk Centre

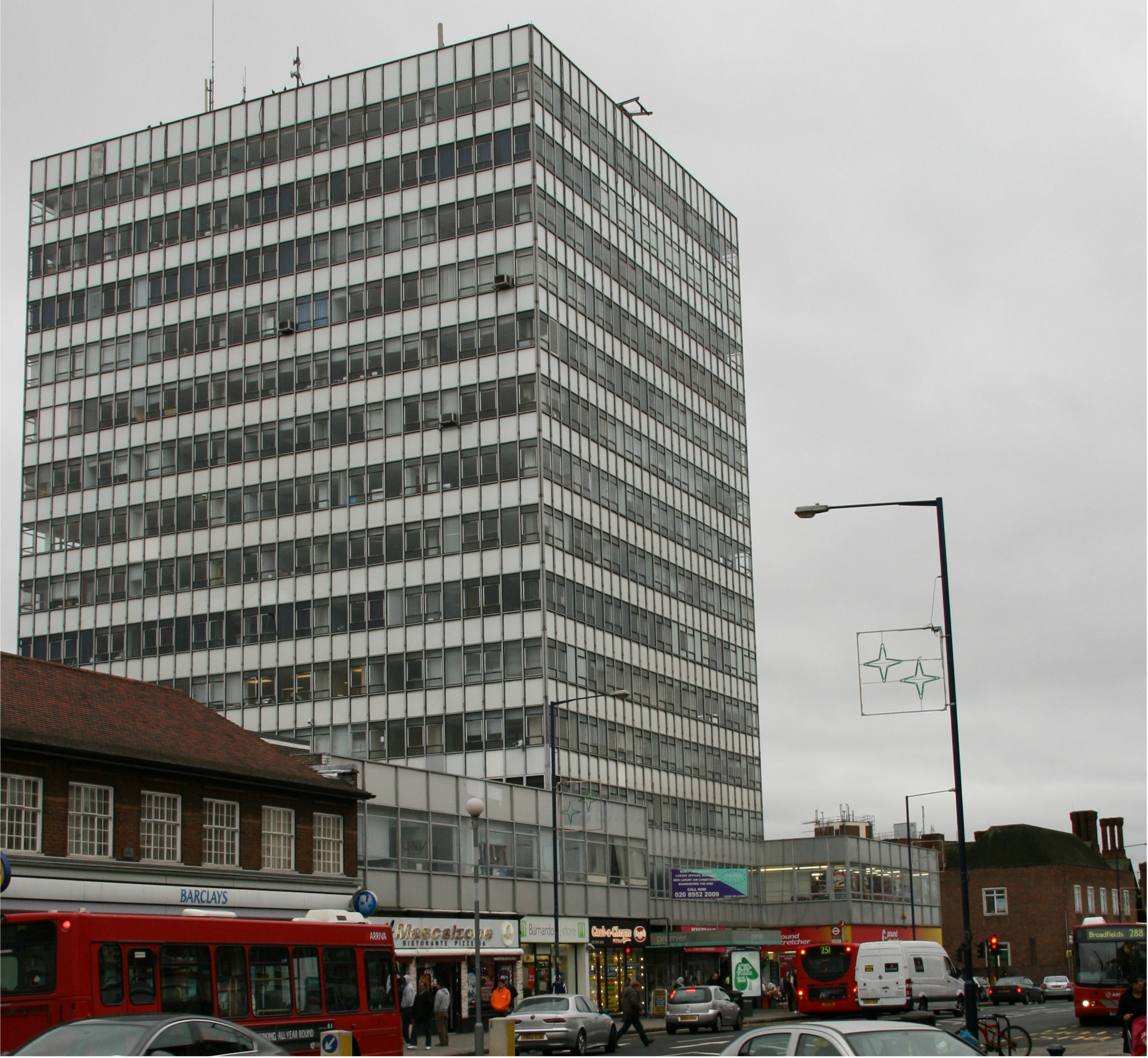
Premier House on Station Road; it was formerly Green Shield House, headquarters of Green Shield Stamps

The Broadwalk Centre is located in the town centre; it was opened in the 1990s.

Argonaut Games once had its head office in Edgware. It was based at Argonaut House, now known as Cavendish House. The computer game Worms was designed there and contracts came from Nintendo.

Green Shield Stamps was also headquartered in Edgware until its closure in 1991. It occupied Premier House, which commenced its development in 2014 into 121 residential flats, known as Premier Place.

== Education ==
Primary:

- Beit Shvidler Primary School
- Broadfields Primary School
- Deansbrook Primary School
- Edgware Junior School
- Holland House School
- Krishna Avanti Primary School
- Rosh Pinah Primary School.

Secondary:

- Canons High School
- London Academy
- North London Collegiate School.

== Transport ==
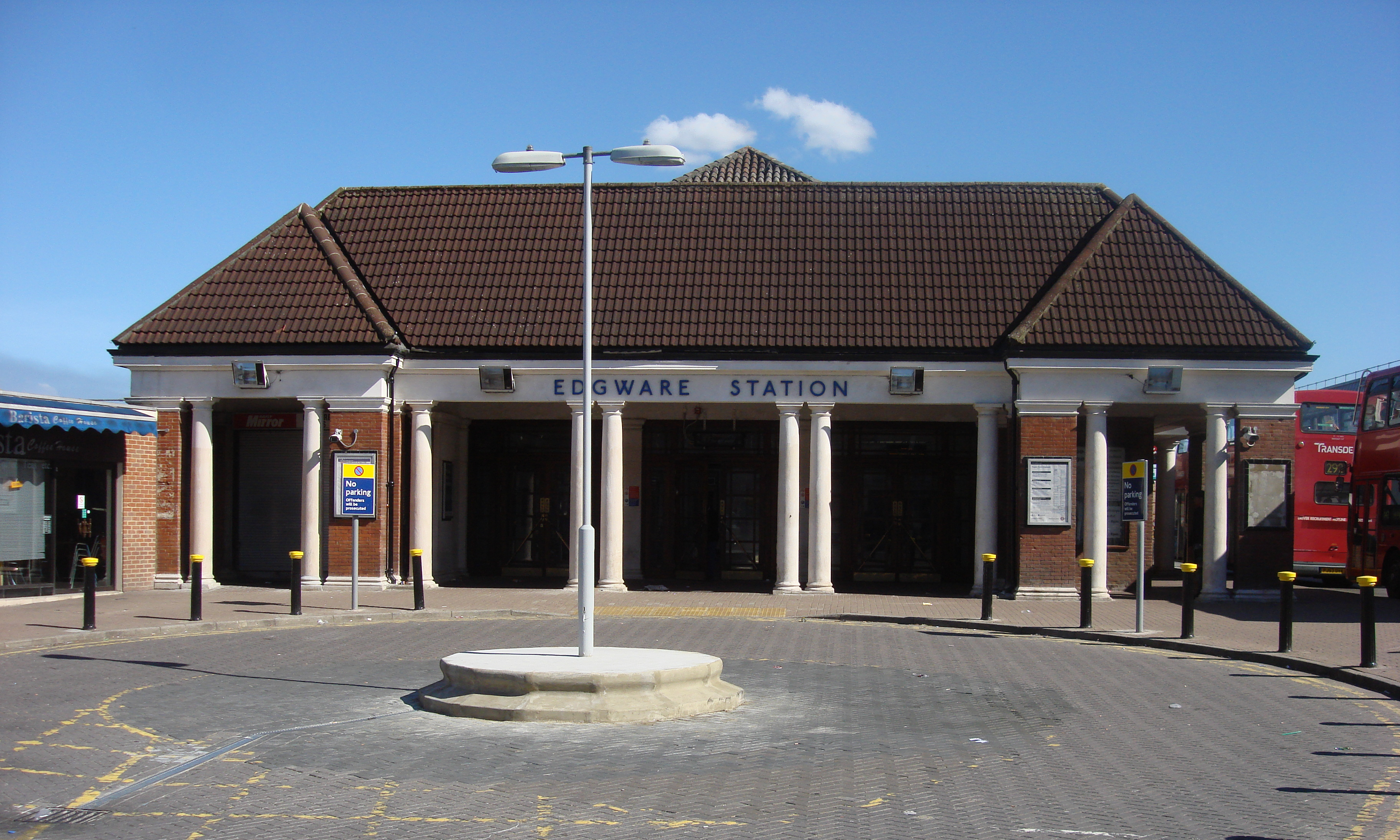
The tube station

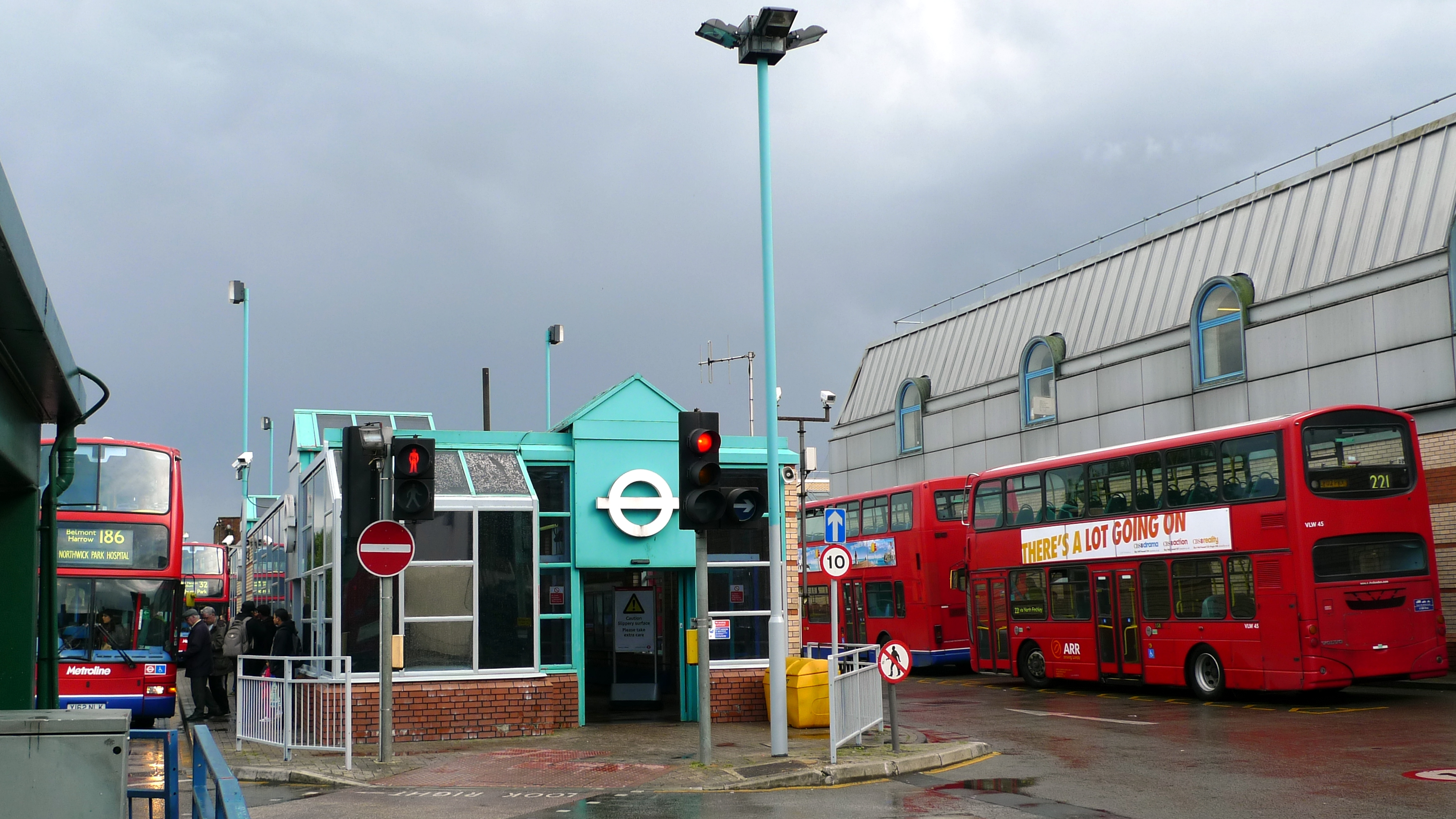
Edgware bus station

Like most parts of north-west London, Edgware is served very well by the London Underground; there are four stations serving the area on two lines:

- Edgware (Northern line)
- Burnt Oak (Northern line)
- Canons Park (Jubilee line)
- Queensbury (Jubilee line).

London Buses routes are operated primary by Metroline, First Bus London, Arriva London and Uno; these connect the town with central London and other key locations in north-west London. Uno also operates some non-TfL routes to Hatfield, Queensbury, Southgate and Whetstone.

Major roads in the vicinity include the A5, the A41 road (Watford by-pass) and the M1 motorway. The A5, originally the Roman Watling Street, runs from central London to Wroxeter, in Shropshire. It is known locally as the High Street, Stone Grove and Brockley Hill, as it runs along the Edgware/Little Stanmore parish boundary. Immediately south of that boundary, it is known as Burnt Oak Broadway; further south, it is known as Edgware Road.

== Media ==
Local news in Edgware is provided by the weekly printed or on-line boroughwide Times series; a group of north London newspapers published weekly in the London Borough of Barnet and surroundings. The Harrow Times includes news for Edgware.

== Sport ==
Edgware Cricket Club is based at Canons Park; it plays Saturday and Sunday League cricket during the summer months.

Edgware Town F.C. is a football club that represents the town, but is currently based in nearby Kingsbury.

== Notable people ==
- John Bercow: former Speaker of the House of Commons and MP for Buckingham
- Ashley Blaker: comedian and television producer
- Boz Boorer: guitarist, producer, co-writer and musical director for Morrissey
- Paul Chowdhry: stand-up comedian
- Antony Costa: singer from boy band Blue
- Tony Currie: footballer
- Sope Dirisu: actor
- Shirley Eaton: actress
- Steve Ellis (1950–): lead singer of 1960s pop group The Love Affair, born in Edgware
- Victor Feldman (1934–84): jazz musician (1934–1984), was born in Edgware
- Fenella Fielding (1927–2018): actress, lived in Edgware in her early life
- Dean Furman (born 1988): professional footballer, grew up in Edgware
- George Frideric Handel (1685–1759): composer
- Dave Mattacks: rock and folk drummer, best known for his work with Fairport Convention
- Patrick McGoohan (1928–2009): lead actor in the 1967 series The Prisoner, lived in a large detached house on The Ridgeway, Mill Hill Village
- George Michael: pop singer
- David Piper: racing driver
- Richard Russell: owner of UK Record Label, XL Recordings
- Ben Strevens: former professional footballer
- Mitchell Symons: journalist and author
- William Wilberforce (1759–1833): slave trade abolitionist, lived on the Highwood Hill estate, Mill Hill (1826–31)
- Frank Williams: actor.

== Gallery ==
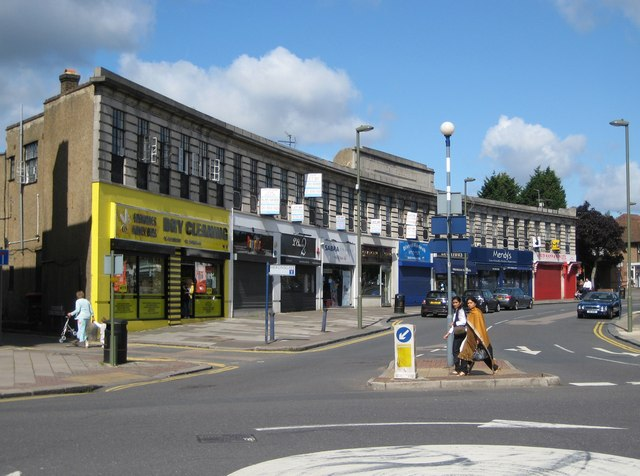
Kings Parade, Edgwarebury Lane.

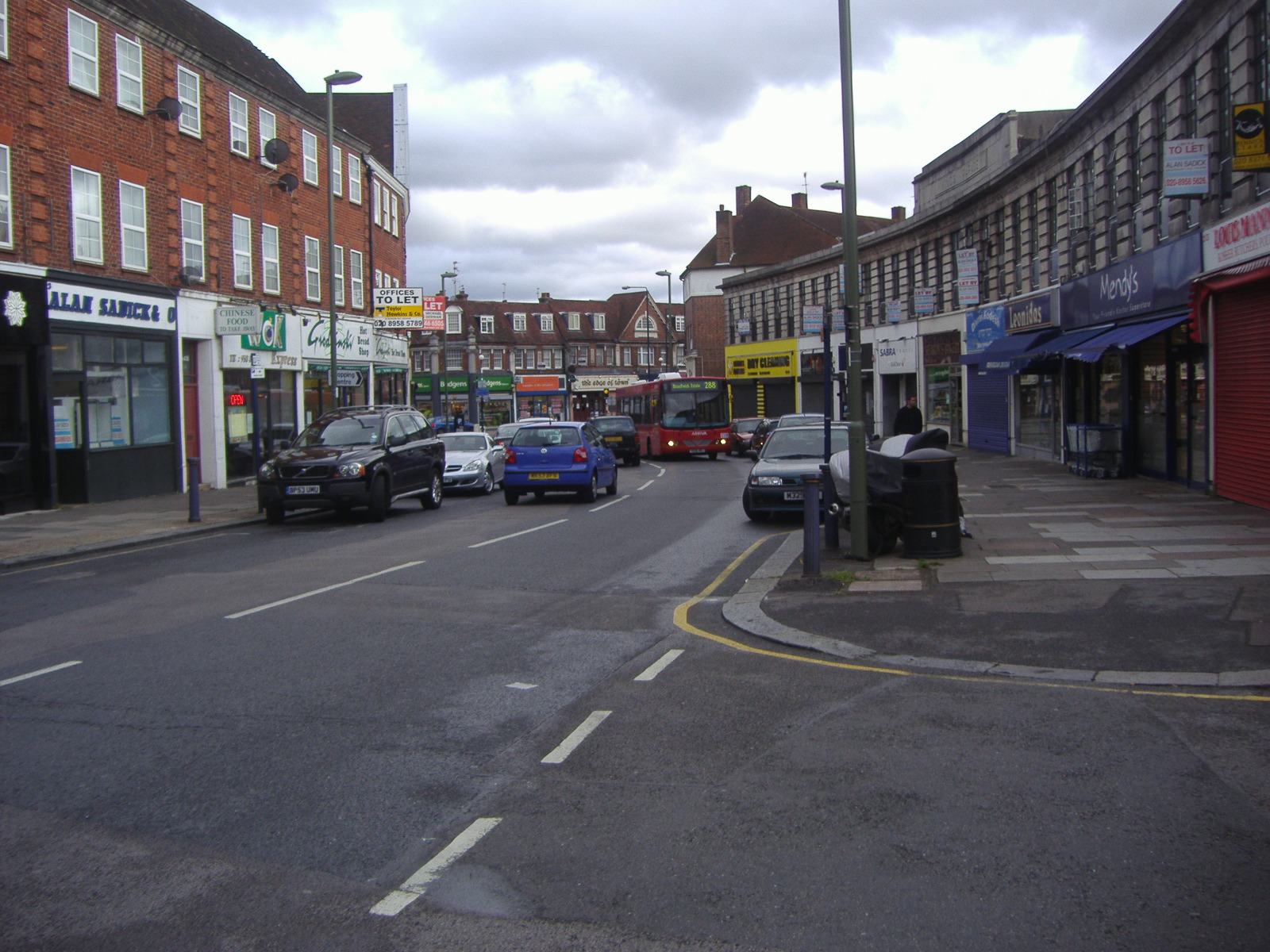
Edgwarebury Lane

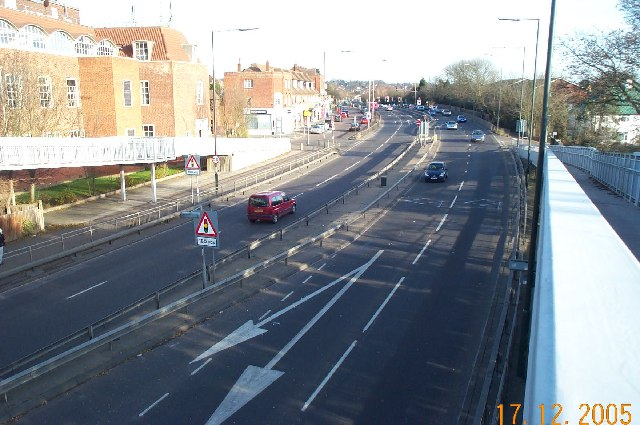
A41 Edgware Way, located north from the town centre; view from Edgwarebury Lane footbridge.

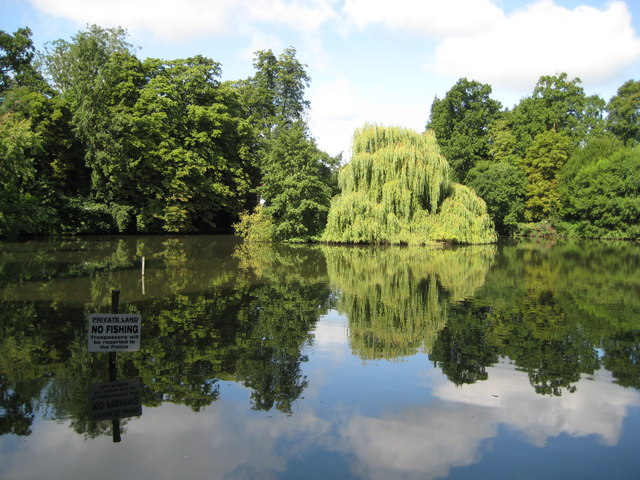
Basin Lake, located in Canons Drive to the west of Edgware in the borough of Harrow

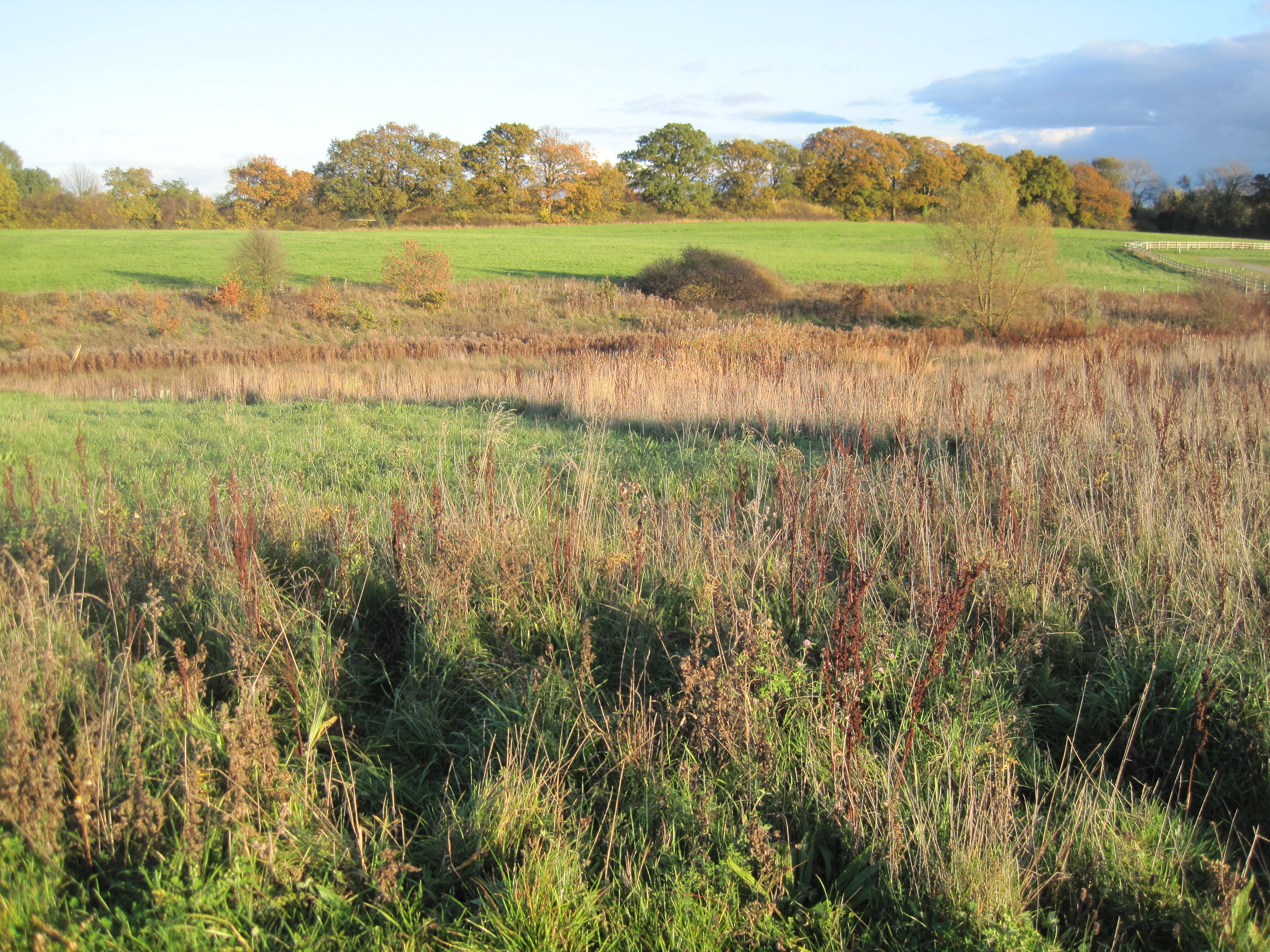
Grassland in Edgwarebury Park, taken from the A41 Edgware Way/Watford by-pass. This is the far north, rural area of Edgware.

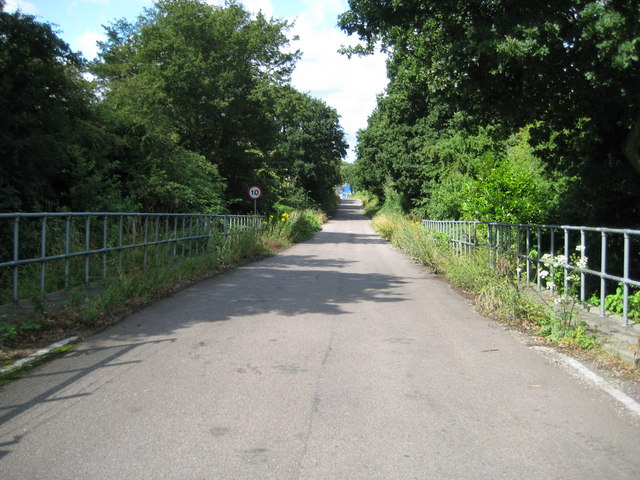
Former track of the Great Northern Railway line, which closed in 1964. View from Dean's Lane in the east of Edgware

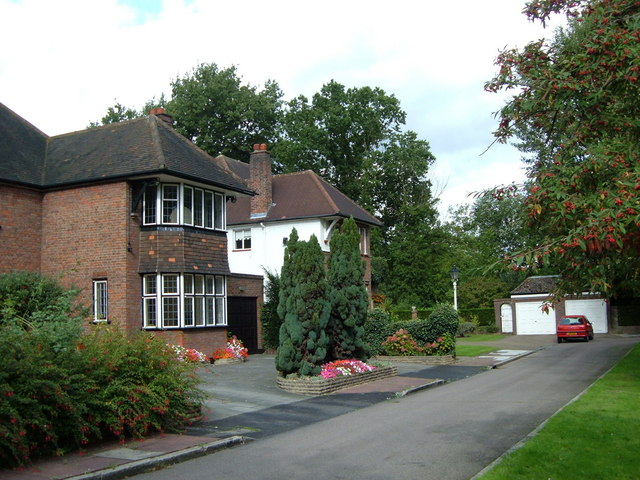
Rose Garden Close in western Edgware, near Canons Drive. This road consists of large suburban houses, near Lake Grove

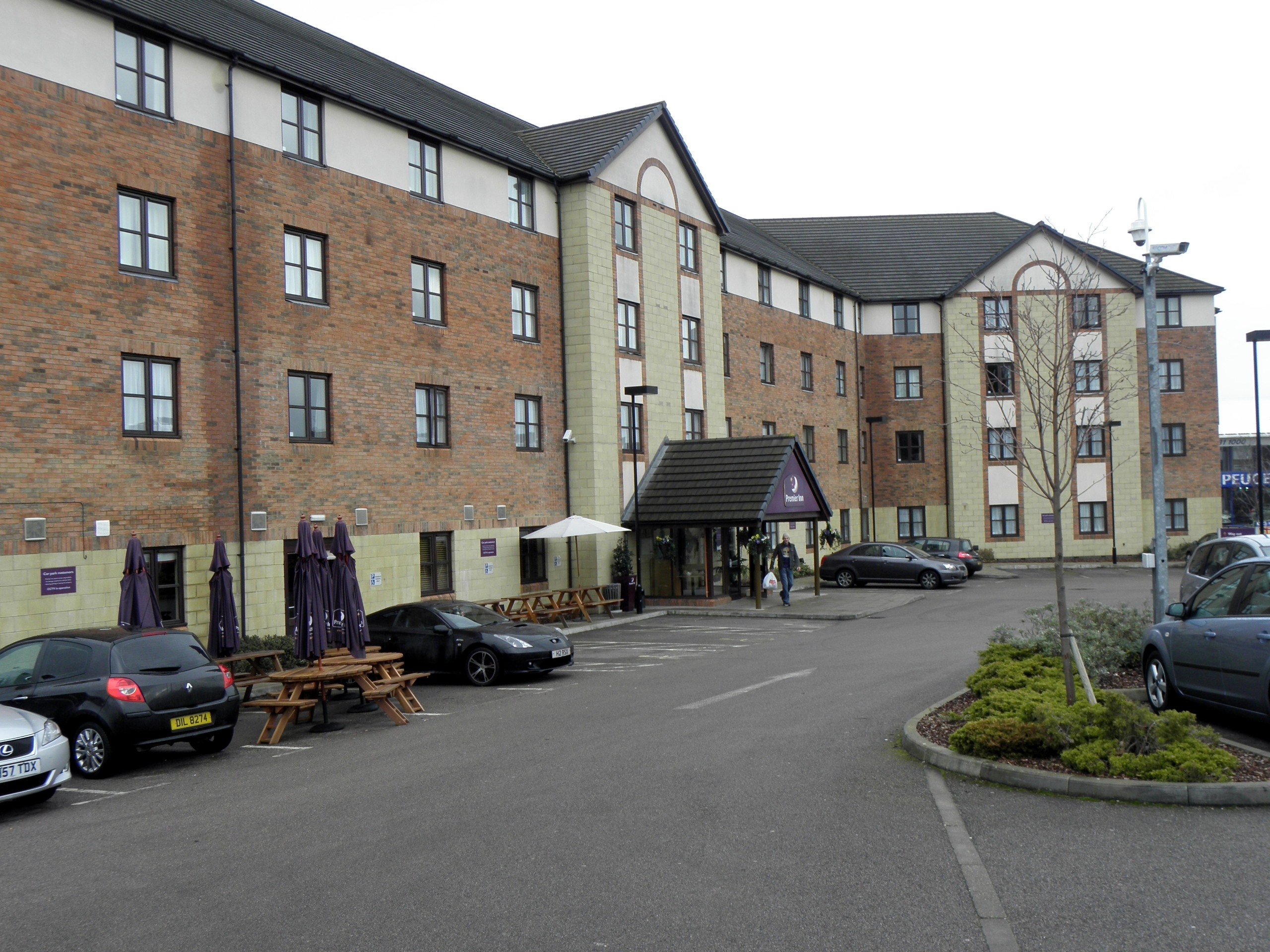
Premier Inn hotel.
